= Polar auxin transport =

Proteins that mediate movement of auxin across membranes

Polar auxin transport is the regulated transport of the plant hormone auxin in plants. It is an active process, the hormone is transported in cell-to-cell manner and one of the main features of the transport is its asymmetry and directionality (polarity). The polar auxin transport functions to coordinate plant development; the following spatial auxin distribution underpins most of plant growth responses to its environment and plant growth and developmental changes in general. In other words, the flow and relative concentrations of auxin informs each plant cell where it is located and therefore what it should do or become.

== Chemiosmotic model ==
Polar auxin transport (PAT) is directional and active flow of auxin molecules through the plant tissues. The flow of auxin molecules through the neighboring cells is driven by carriers (type of membrane transport protein) in the cell-to-cell fashion (from one cell to other cell and then to the next one) and the direction of the flow is determined by the localization of the carriers on the plasma membrane in the concerned cells.

The transport from cell to the neighboring one is achieved through relatively complex combination of several sub-processes. To explain the mechanism behind unique character of auxin transport through living cell files of the plant, the so-called chemiosmotic model was formulated. The mechanism was first proposed in the 1970s by Ruberry and Sheldrake and this visionary prediction was finally proven in the 21st century.

The mechanism below describes the process in which auxin is trapped in the cell by the so-called acid trap and how it can then leave the cell only by activity of specific carriers, which control the directionality of the flow from cells and generally the direction of auxin transport through the whole plant body.

=== Acid trap ===
Passive diffusion on a cell membrane. However; in a case of auxins, only the non-dissociated portion of auxin molecules is able to cross the membrane

As weak acids, the protonation state of auxins is dictated by the pH of the environment; a strongly acidic environment inhibits the forward reaction (dissociation), whereas an alkaline environment strongly favors it (see Henderson-Hasselbalch equation):

The export of auxins from cells is termed auxin efflux and the entry of auxin in to cells is called auxin influx. The first step in polar transport is auxin influx. Auxin enters plant cells by two methods, first by passive diffusion as non-ionized protonated indole-3-acetic acid (IAAH) across the phospholipid bilayer, or second by active co-transport in the anionic form IAA^{−}. As IAAH is lipophilic, it can easily cross the lipid bilayer.

IAAH ⇌ IAA^{−} + H^{+}, where IAAH = indole-3-acetic acid; IAA^{−} = its conjugate base

The inside of cells (pH ~ 7) is less acidic than the outside (the apoplast; pH ~ 5.5). So outside the cell a significant portion (17%) of the IAA molecules remain un-dissociated (proton-associated). This portion of auxin molecules is charge-neutral and therefore it is able to diffuse through the lipophilic lipid bilayer (lipid bilayer being constituent of cell membrane) into the cells. Once through the bilayer in the cell, the molecules are exposed to the more basic pH of the cell interior, and there they dissociate almost completely, producing anionic IAA^{−}. These chemically polar ions are unable to passively diffuse across the cell membrane and remain trapped inside the cell.

=== Polarity of auxin export ===
Once inside the cell, auxin cannot leave the cell on its own by crossing the lipid bilayer. Hence the export of auxin from the cell requires an active transport component in the plasma membrane - i.e. some membrane transport protein. Two protein families: The PIN proteins and ABCB (PGP proteins) transporters function as "auxin efflux carriers" and transport the anionic form of auxin out of the cell. While the PGP auxin efflux carriers are evenly distributed, the PIN proteins normally maintain polar (i.e. asymmetric) localisation on the plasma membrane. That is to say they are most concentrated on one side of the cell. Furthermore, the asymmetrical localisation of the PIN proteins is coordinated between neighbouring cells. As a result, the PIN proteins generate a directional flow of auxin at the tissue and organ scale. This PIN-generated flow is called auxin polar transport. For example, the cells located in the vasculature (at the center) of the root all show PIN1 proteins on their basal membrane only (i.e. on their lower side). As a result, in the root vasculature, auxin is transported directionally from the shoot to the root tip (i.e. downwards).

== Role in plant development ==
=== Self-organisation of polar auxin transport ===
See also "Uneven distribution of auxin" and "Organization of the plant" in the main Auxin article

Auxin plays a central role in PIN protein polarity establishment. The regulation of PIN localisation by auxin creates a feedback loop where PIN proteins control the directionality of auxin fluxes, and auxin in turn controls PIN proteins localisation. These interactions between auxin and its own transporters confer to the system self-organizing properties, which explains for instance phyllotaxis (the regular and geometrical arrangements of lateral organ along the stem), the formation of leaf serrations, and the formation of vascular strands. This positive feedback regulation auxin on its own transport also plays an essential role in vascular development, which process is called canalization.

PIN proteins are so named because mutant plants lacking the founding member of this family, PIN1, cannot develop flowers. The formation of flowers is triggered by regularly spaced local auxin accumulation at the surface of the shoot apical meristem and, for this PIN1 is required. As a result, the pin1 mutant plants produce a "pin-like" inflorescence consisting only of a naked stem. This highlights the importance of polar auxin transport in plant development.

=== Tropisms ===
Other external and internal signals (e.g. blue light, mechanical stress, gravity or cytokinins) can interfere with PIN protein polarity and therefore with the directionality of auxin polar transport. Because auxin controls cell division and cell elongation, the change of PIN proteins localisation, and the subsequent change in auxin distribution, often lead to a change in the growth pattern.

For instance, the regulation of polar auxin transport is central in a process such as gravitropism. This process, which ensures that the root grows downwards, relies on the redistribution of auxin by the columella cells (the cells located at the very tip of the root). These cells respond to gravity by special organelles, the statoliths, that redistribute auxin from the vasculature to the root epidermis and the lateral root cap. These tissues (which form the external cell layers of the root) transport auxin back to the elongation zone where it regulates cell elongation. When the gravitational gradient is not aligned with the axis of the columella cells (because the root is not vertical), the PIN proteins move to the side of the cell membrane that is gravitationally lowest. This causes more auxin to flow to the lower side of the root. Once in the elongation zone, the extra auxin inhibits cell elongation and cause the root to re-orient downwards.

Similar mechanisms occur in other tropic responses, such as phototropism. The mechanisms were first described by the Cholodny-Went model, proposed in the 1920s by N. Cholodny and Frits Warmolt Went.

=== Generation of morphogenetic gradients ===
Polar auxin transport is required for the generation of auxin gradients throughout the plant body. Those gradients have development significances akin to the gradients of morphogens in animal bodies. They are necessary for development, growth and response of any plant organ (such as cotyledons, leaves, roots, flowers or fruits) and response of plant to environmental stimuli known as tropisms.

== Regulation ==
Although the detailed molecular mechanism of PIN proteins polarity establishment remains to be elucidated, many endogenous and exogenous regulators of PIN proteins localisation have been characterised.

=== Auxin ===
Most importantly, PIN proteins localisation on the plasma membrane is controlled by auxin. Several mathematical models making different assumptions on the way auxin influences PIN localisation explain different observations. Some models assume PIN proteins polarize towards the neighbouring cell containing the highest cytosolic auxin concentration. These models are called "up-the-gradient" models and explain for instance phyllotaxis. Other models assume that PIN proteins localise on the side of the cell where the efflux of auxin is the highest. These models are called "with-the-flux" models and explain the formation of vascular strands in leaves.

The molecular mechanism responsible for these different behaviours of the system (with-the-flux and up-the-gradient) is not yet fully understood. Noticeably, an auxin receptor protein called ABP1 is thought to play a potentially significant role in the control of PIN proteins polarity by auxin.

=== Mechanical stress ===
Mechanical signals have been proposed to regulate PIN polarity.

=== Vesicle Trafficking ===
The asymmetrical localisation of PIN efflux carrier protein at the plasma membrane has been shown to involve the localized targeting of vesicles and the local regulation of endocytosis. The latter involves the actin cytoskeleton.

=== Inhibitors of the transport ===
In research, 1-N-Naphthylphthalamic acid (NPA) and 2,3,5-triiodobenzoic acid (TIBA) are used as specific inhibitors of the auxin efflux.

Quercetin (a flavonol) and Genistein are naturally occurring auxin transport inhibitors.

9-Hydroxyfluorene-9-carboxylic acid (HFCA), TIBA, and trans-cinnamic acid (TCA) are also example of Polar Auxin Transport Inhibitors. They prevent the development of the bilateral growth of the plant embryo during the globular stage. All 3 inhibitors induce the formation of fused cotyledons in globular but not heart-shaped embryo.

=== Phosphorylation ===
Polar auxin transport can be regulated by reversible protein phosphorylation; protein kinases and protein phosphatases mediate the phosphorylation and dephosphorylation, respectively. A study suggests that phosphatase inhibition can alter the activities of acropetal and basipetal auxin transport. With decades of studies, multiple kinases have been reported to phosphorylate PIN proteins, including PINOID, D6PK, PAX, MPK6 and CRK5; and phosphorylated PIN proteins can be oppositely dephosphorylated by Protein Phosphatase 2A (PP2A), Protein Phosphatase 1 (PP1) and PP6. The AGC family of kinases play essential roles in catalyzing PIN phosphorylation and in regulating PIN function. 3'-Phosphoinositide dependent protein kinase 1 (PDK1), also from the AGC family, is a critical activator of AGC kinases and is thus also involved in the regulation of PIN-mediated auxin transport. PINOID and D6PK share at least three phosphosites (P-sites) at the cytoplasmic loop (also called hydrophilic loop) of long PIN proteins, but their functions are not all the same. both of the two kinases can increase PIN activity via phosphorylation. However, PINOID (non-polar)-mediated phosphorylation also determines the apicobasal polar targeting of PIN proteins, i.e., more phosphorylation, more apical. D6PK and its homologs localize at the basal side of plasma membrane, modulating the rootward auxin fluxes and subsequent developmental processes.
