= Germination =

Growth of an organism from a seed or spore

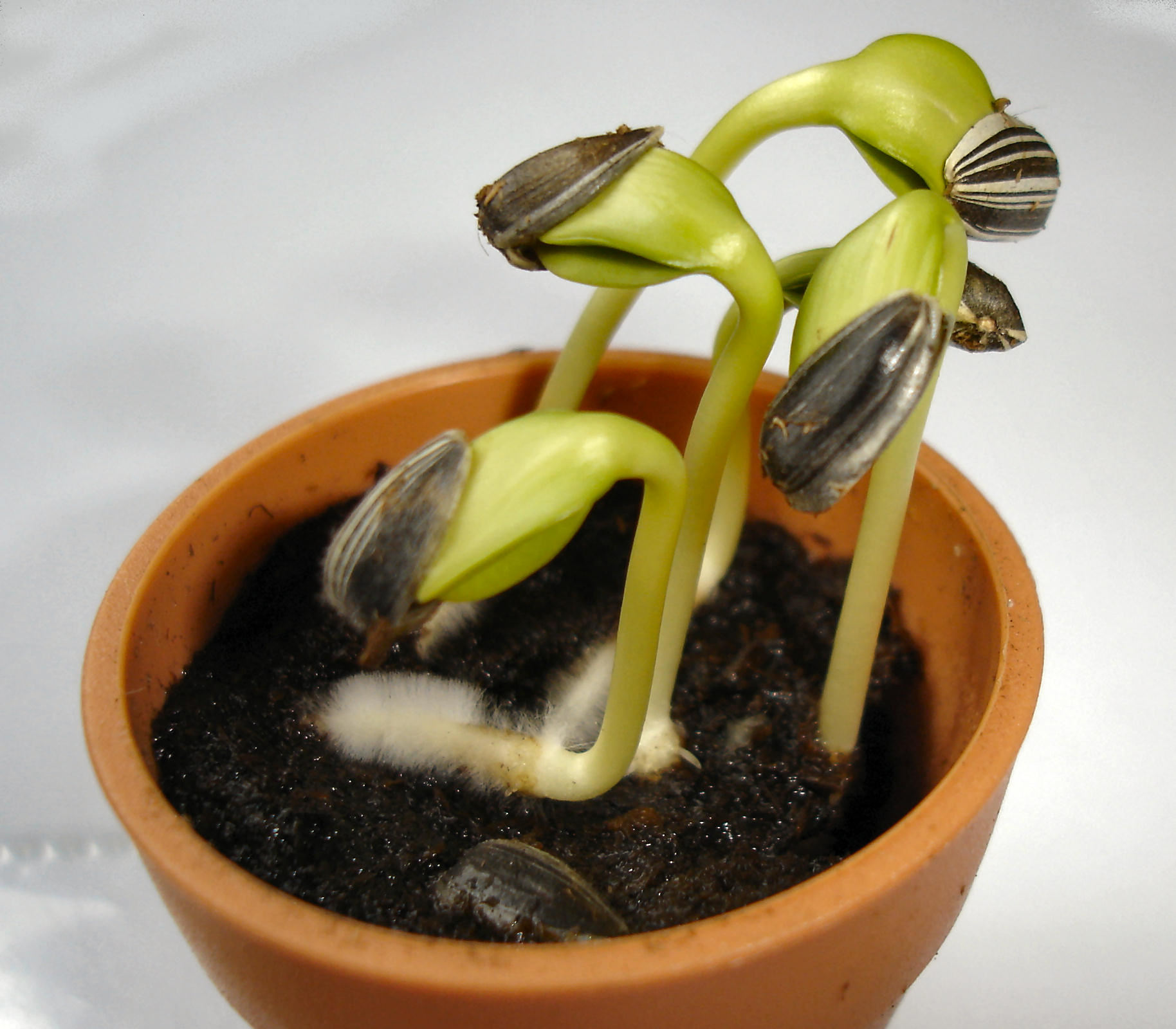
Sunflower seedlings, three days after germination

Sunflower time lapse with soil. Cross section, showing how the root and the upper part of the plant grow

Sequential stages of germination showing the radicle emerging followed by early stages of plant growth.

Germination is the process by which an organism grows from a seed or spore. The term is applied to the sprouting of a seedling from a seed of an angiosperm or gymnosperm, the growth of a sporeling from a spore, such as the spores of fungi, ferns, bacteria, and the growth of the pollen tube from the pollen grain of a seed plant.

== Seed plants ==
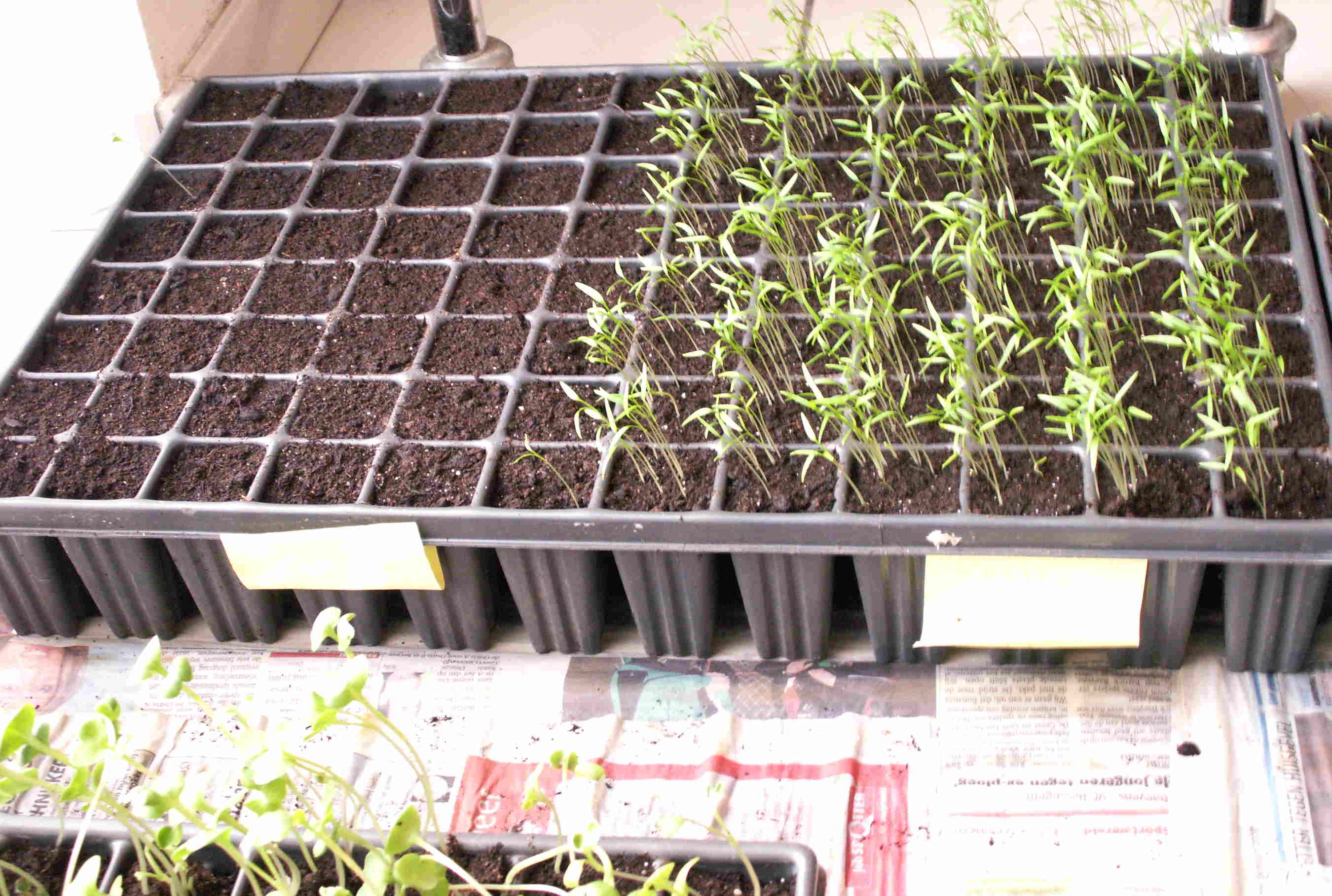
A seed pot used in horticulture for sowing and taking plant cuttings and growing plugs

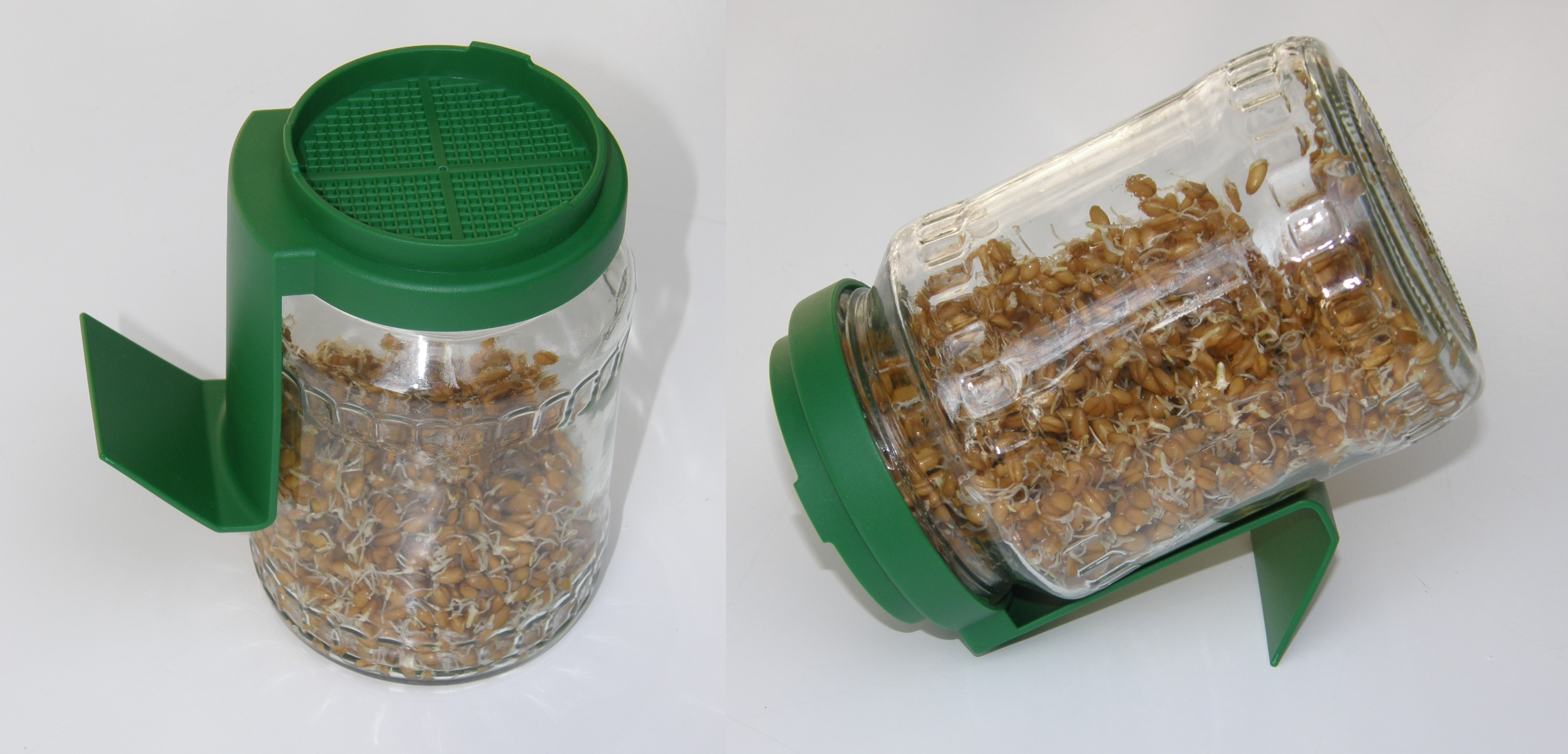
Germination glass (glass sprouter jar) with a plastic sieve-lid

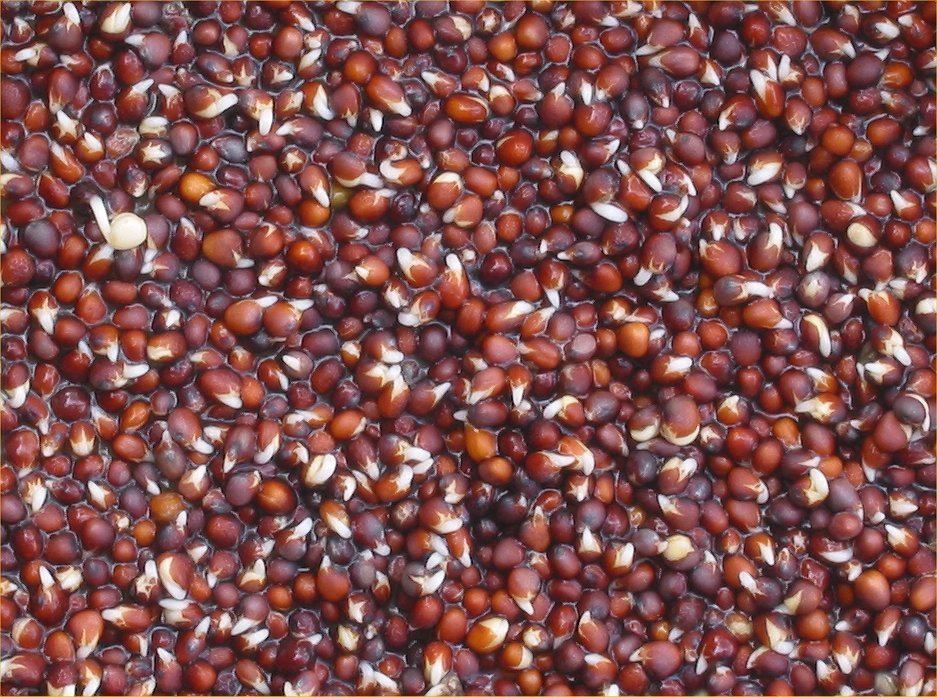
Brassica campestris germinating seeds

Time-lapse video of mung bean seeds germinating

Germination is usually the growth of a plant contained within a seed resulting in the formation of the seedling. It is also the process of reactivation of metabolic machinery of the seed resulting in the emergence of radicle and plumule. The seed of a vascular plant is a small package produced in a fruit or cone after the union of male and female reproductive cells. All fully developed seeds contain an embryo and, in most plant species some store of food reserves, wrapped in a seed coat. Dormant seeds are viable seeds that do not germinate because they require specific internal or environmental stimuli to resume growth. Under proper conditions, the seed begins to germinate and the embryo resumes growth, developing into a seedling.

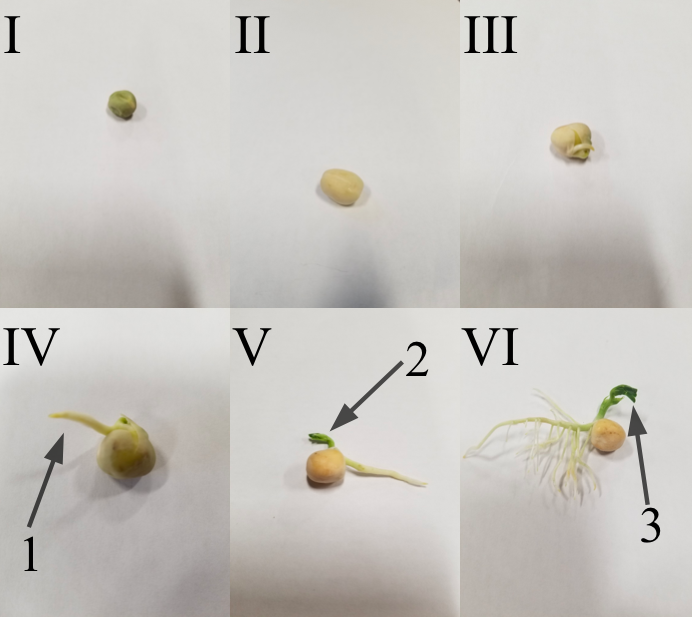
Step 1: Water imbibition, the uptake of water, results in rupture of seed coat. Step 2: The imbibition of the seed coat results in emergence of the radicle (1) and the plumule (2); the cotyledons (seed leaves) unfold (3). Step 3: This marks the final step in the germination of the seed, where after the cotyledons are expanded, the first true leaves develop. Note: Temperature must be kept at an optimum level.

Disturbance of soil can result in vigorous plant growth by exposing seeds already in the soil to changes in environmental factors where germination may have previously been inhibited by depth of the seeds or soil that was too compact. This is often observed at gravesites after a burial.

Seed germination depends on both internal and external conditions. The most important external factors include right temperature, water, oxygen or air and sometimes light or darkness. Various plants require different variables for successful seed germination. Often this depends on the individual seed variety and is closely linked to the ecological conditions of a plant's natural habitat. For some seeds, their future germination response is affected by environmental conditions during seed formation; most often these responses are types of seed dormancy.

- Water is required for germination. Mature seeds are often extremely dry and need to take in significant amounts of water, relative to the dry weight of the seed, before cellular metabolism and growth can resume. Most seeds need enough water to moisten the seeds but not enough to soak them. The uptake of water by seeds is called imbibition, which leads to the swelling and the breaking of the seed coat. When seeds are formed, most plants store a food reserve with the seed, such as starch, proteins, or oils. This food reserve provides nourishment to the growing embryo. When the seed imbibes water, hydrolytic enzymes are activated which break down these stored food resources into metabolically useful chemicals. After the seedling emerges from the seed coat and starts growing roots and leaves, the seedling's food reserves are typically exhausted; at this point photosynthesis provides the energy needed for continued growth and the seedling now requires a continuous supply of water, nutrients, and light.
- Oxygen is required by the germinating seed for metabolism. Oxygen is used in aerobic respiration, the main source of the seedling's energy until it grows leaves. Oxygen is an atmospheric gas that is found in soil pore spaces; if a seed is buried too deeply within the soil or the soil is waterlogged, the seed can be oxygen starved. Some seeds have impermeable seed coats that prevent oxygen from entering the seed, causing a type of physical dormancy which is broken when the seed coat is worn away enough to allow gas exchange and water uptake from the environment.
  - In a small number of plants, such as rice, anaerobic germination can occur in waterlogged conditions. The seed produces a hollow coleoptile that acts like a 'snorkel', providing the seed with access to oxygen.
- Temperature affects cellular metabolism and growth rates. Seeds from different species and even seeds from the same plant germinate over a wide range of temperatures. Seeds often have a temperature range within which they will germinate, and they will not do so above or below this range. Many seeds germinate at temperatures slightly above 60–75 F (16–24 C) [room-temperature in centrally heated houses], while others germinate just above freezing and others germinate only in response to alternations in temperature between warm and cool. Some seeds germinate when the soil is cool 28–40 F (-2 – 4 C), and some when the soil is warm 76–90 F (24–32 C). Some seeds require exposure to cold temperatures (vernalization) to break dormancy. Some seeds in a dormant state will not germinate even if conditions are favorable. Seeds that are dependent on temperature to end dormancy have a type of physiological dormancy. For example, seeds requiring the cold of winter are inhibited from germinating until they take in water in the fall and experience cooler temperatures. Cold stratification is a process that induces the dormancy breaking prior to light emission that promotes germination . Four degrees Celsius is cool enough to end dormancy for most cool dormant seeds, but some groups, especially within the family Ranunculaceae and others, need conditions cooler than -5 C. Some seeds will only germinate after hot temperatures during a forest fire which cracks their seed coats; this is a type of physical dormancy.

Most common annual vegetables have optimal germination temperatures between 75–90 F (24–32 C), though many species (e.g. radishes or spinach) can germinate at significantly lower temperatures, as low as 40 F (4 C), thus allowing them to be grown from seeds in cooler climates. Suboptimal temperatures lead to lower success rates and longer germination periods.

- Light or darkness can be an environmental trigger for germination and is a type of physiological dormancy. Most seeds are not affected by light or darkness, but many photoblastic seeds, including species found in forest settings, will not germinate until an opening in the canopy allows sufficient light for the growth of the seedling.
- Scarification mimics natural processes that weaken the seed coat before germination. In nature, some seeds require particular conditions to germinate, such as the heat of a fire (e.g., many Australian native plants), or soaking in a body of water for a long period of time. Others need to be passed through an animal's digestive tract to weaken the seed coat enough to allow the seedling to emerge.

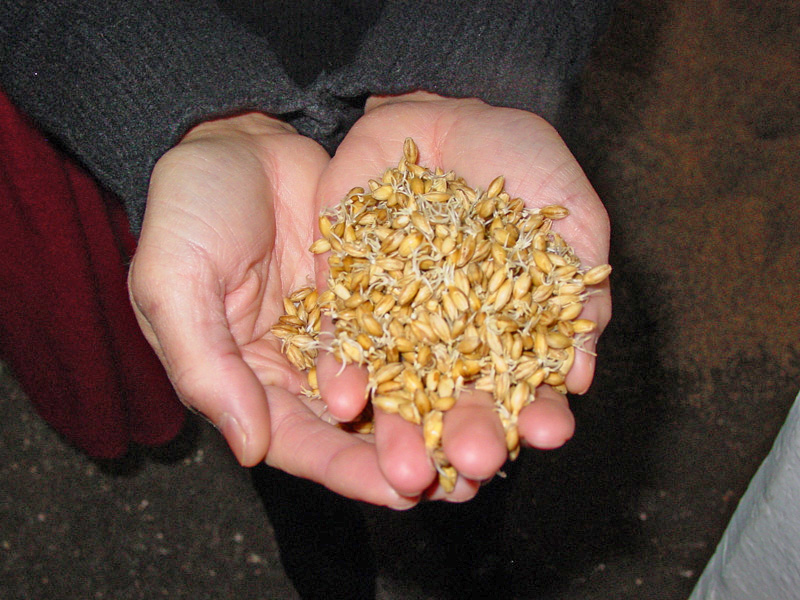
Malted (germinated) barley grains

=== Dormancy ===
Some live seeds are dormant and need more time, and/or need to be subjected to specific environmental conditions before they will germinate. Seed dormancy can originate in different parts of the seed, for example, within the embryo; in other cases the seed coat is involved. Dormancy breaking often involves changes in membranes, initiated by dormancy-breaking signals. This generally occurs only within hydrated seeds. Factors affecting seed dormancy include the presence of certain plant hormones, notably abscisic acid, which inhibits germination, and gibberellin, which ends seed dormancy. In brewing, barley seeds are treated with gibberellin to ensure uniform seed germination for the production of barley malt.

=== Seedling establishment ===
In some definitions, the appearance of the radicle marks the end of germination and the beginning of "establishment", a period that utilizes the food reserves stored in the seed. Germination and establishment as an independent organism are critical phases in the life of a plant when they are the most vulnerable to injury, disease, and water stress. The germination index can be used as an indicator of phytotoxicity in soils. The mortality between dispersal of seeds and completion of the establishment can be so high that many species have adapted to produce large numbers of seeds.

== Germination rate and germination capacity ==
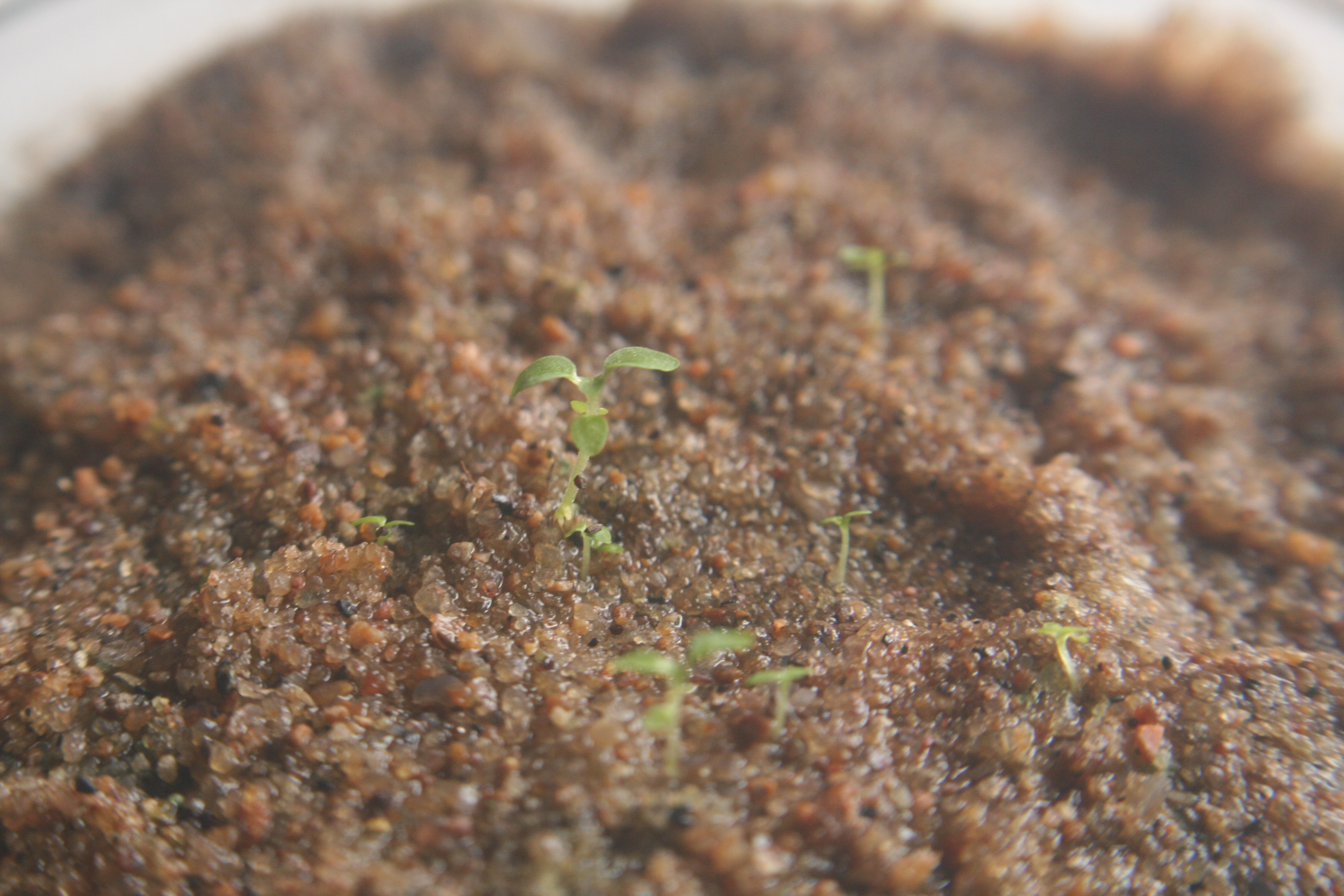
Germination of seedlings raised from seeds of eucalyptus after three days of sowing

In agriculture and gardening, the germination rate describes how many seeds of a particular plant species, variety or seedlot are likely to germinate over a given period. It is a measure of germination time course and is usually expressed as a percentage, e.g., an 85% germination rate indicates that about 85 out of 100 seeds will probably germinate under proper conditions over the germination period given. Seed germination rate is determined by the seed genetic composition, morphological features and environmental factors. The germination rate is useful for calculating the number of seeds needed for a given area or desired number of plants. For seed physiologists and seed scientists "germination rate" is the reciprocal of time taken for the process of germination to complete starting from time of sowing. On the other hand, the number of seed able to complete germination in a population (i.e. seed lot) is referred to as germination capacity.

Soil salinity is one of the stress factors that can limit the germination rate. Environmental stress activates some stress-related activities [CuZn-superoxide dismutase (SOD), Mn-SOD, L-ascorbate oxidase (AO), DNA polymerase Delta 1 (POLD)-1, Chaperon (CHAPE) and heat shock protein (HSP)-21], genetic template stability and photosynthetic pigment activation. Application of exogenic glutamine limiting this process. Research carried out on onion seeds shows a reduction in the mean germination time, an increase in the coefficient of germination velocity, the germination index and germination percentage after administration of exogenous glutamine to plants.

=== Repair of DNA damage ===
Seed quality deteriorates with age, and this is associated with accumulation of genome damage. During germination, repair processes are activated to deal with accumulated DNA damage. In particular, single- and double-strand breaks in DNA can be repaired. The DNA damage checkpoint kinase ATM has a major role in integrating progression through germination with repair responses to the DNA damages accumulated by the aged seed.

=== Dicot germination ===
The stages of germination of a pea plant: A. seed coat, B. radicle, C. primary root, D. secondary root, E. cotyledon, F. plumule, G. leaf, H. tap root

The part of the plant that first emerges from the seed is the embryonic root, termed the radicle or primary root. It allows the seedling to become anchored in the ground and start absorbing water. After the root absorbs water, an embryonic shoot, termed the plumule emerges from the seed. This shoot comprises three main parts: the cotyledons (seed leaves), the section of shoot below the cotyledons (hypocotyl), and the section of shoot above the cotyledons (epicotyl). The way the shoot emerges differs among plant groups.

==== Epigeal ====
Epigeal germination (or epigeous germination) is a botanical term indicating that the germination takes place above the ground. In epigeal germination, the hypocotyl elongates and forms a hook, pulling rather than pushing the cotyledons and apical meristem through the soil. Once it reaches the surface, it straightens and pulls the cotyledons and shoot tip of the growing seedlings into the air. Beans, tamarind, and papaya are examples of plants that germinate this way.

==== Hypogeal ====
Germination can also be done by hypogeal germination (or hypogeous germination), where the epicotyl elongates and forms the hook. In this type of germination, the cotyledons stay underground where they eventually decompose. For example: peas, chickpeas and mango germinate this way.

=== Monocot germination ===
In monocot seeds, the embryo's radicle and cotyledon are covered by a coleorhiza and coleoptile, respectively. The coleorhiza is the first part to grow out of the seed, followed by the radicle. The coleoptile is then pushed up through the ground until it reaches the surface. There, it stops elongating and the first leaves emerge.

=== Precocious germination ===
When a seed germinates without undergoing all four stages of seed development, i.e., globular, heart shape, torpedo shape, and cotyledonary stage, it is known as precocious germination.

== Pollen germination ==
Another germination event during the life cycle of gymnosperms and flowering plants is the germination of a pollen grain after pollination. Like seeds, pollen grains are severely dehydrated before being released to facilitate their dispersal from one plant to another. They consist of a protective coat containing several cells (up to 8 in gymnosperms, 2–3 in flowering plants). One of these cells is a tube cell. Once the pollen grain lands on the stigma of a receptive flower (or a female cone in gymnosperms), it takes up water and germinates. Pollen germination is facilitated by hydration on the stigma, as well as by the structure and physiology of the stigma and style. Pollen can also be induced to germinate in vitro (in a petri dish or test tube).

During germination, the tube cell elongates into a pollen tube. In the flower, the pollen tube then grows towards the ovule where it discharges the sperm produced in the pollen grain for fertilization. The germinated pollen grain with its two sperm cells is the mature male microgametophyte of these plants.

=== Self-incompatibility ===
Since most plants carry both male and female reproductive organs in their flowers, there is a high risk of self-pollination and thus inbreeding. Some plants use the control of pollen germination as a way to prevent this self-pollination. Germination and growth of the pollen tube involve molecular signaling between stigma and pollen. In self-incompatibility in plants, the stigma of certain plants can molecularly recognize pollen from the same plant and prevent it from germinating.

== Spore germination ==
Germination can also refer to the emergence of cells from resting spores and the growth of sporeling hyphae or thalli from spores in fungi, algae and some plants.

Conidia are asexual reproductive (reproduction without the fusing of gametes) spores of fungi which germinate under specific conditions. A variety of cells can be formed from the germinating conidia. The most common are germ tubes which grow and develop into hyphae. The initial formation and subsequent elongation of the germ tube in the fungus Aspergillus niger has been captured in 3D using holotomography microscopy. Another type of cell is a conidial anastomosis tube (CAT); these differ from germ tubes in that they are thinner, shorter, lack branches, exhibit determinate growth and home toward each other. Each cell is of a tubular shape, but the conidial anastomosis tube forms a bridge that allows fusion between conidia.

3D-visualization of Aspergillus niger spore germination. This image has been captured using holotomography microscopy.

=== Resting spores ===
In resting spores, germination involves cracking the thick cell wall of the dormant spore. For example, in zygomycetes the thick-walled zygosporangium cracks open and the zygospore inside gives rise to the emerging sporangiophore. In slime molds, germination refers to the emergence of amoeboid cells from the hardened spore. After cracking the spore coat, further development involves cell division, but not necessarily the development of a multicellular organism (for example in the free-living amoebas of slime molds).

=== Ferns and mosses ===
In plants such as bryophytes, ferns, and a few others, spores germinate into independent gametophytes. In the bryophytes (e.g., mosses and liverworts), spores germinate into protonemata, similar to fungal hyphae, from which the gametophyte grows. In ferns, the gametophytes are small, heart-shaped prothalli that can often be found underneath a spore-shedding adult plant.

=== Bacteria ===
Bacterial spores can be exospores or endospores which are dormant structures produced by a number of different bacteria. They have no or very low metabolic activity and are formed in response to adverse environmental conditions. They allow survival and are not a form of reproduction. Under suitable conditions the spore germinates to produce a viable bacterium. Endospores are formed inside the mother cell, whereas exospores are formed at the end of the mother cell as a bud.

== Light-stimulated germination ==
As mentioned earlier, light can be an environmental factor that stimulates the germination process. The seed needs to be able to determine when is the perfect time to germinate and they do that by sensing environmental cues. Once germination starts, the stored nutrients that have accumulated during maturation start to be digested which then supports cell expansion and overall growth. Within light-stimulated germination, phytochrome B (PHYB) is the photoreceptor that is responsible for the beginning stages of germination. When red light is present, PHYB is converted to its active form and moves from the cytoplasm to the nucleus where it upregulates the degradation of PIF1. PIF1, phytochrome-interaction-factor-1, negatively regulates germination by increasing the expression of proteins that repress the synthesis of gibberellin (GA), a major hormone in the germination process. Another factor that promotes germination is HFR1 which accumulates in light in some way and forms inactive heterodimers with PIF1.

Although the exact mechanism is not known, nitric oxide (NO) plays a role in this pathway as well. NO is thought to repress PIF1 gene expression and stabilises HFR1 in some way to support the start of germination. Bethke et al. (2006) exposed dormant Arabidopsis seeds to NO gas and within the next 4 days, 90% of the seeds broke dormancy and germinated. The authors also looked at how NO and GA effects the vacuolation process of aleurone cells that allow the movement of nutrients to be digested. A NO mutant resulted in inhibition of vacuolation but when GA was later added the process was active again leading to the belief that NO is prior to GA in the pathway. NO may also lead to the decrease in sensitivity of abscisic acid (ABA), a plant hormone largely responsible for seed dormancy. The balance between GA and ABA is important. When ABA levels are higher than GA then that leads to dormant seeds and when GA levels are higher, seeds germinate. The switch between seed dormancy and germination needs to occur at a time when the seed has the best chances of surviving and an important cue that begins the process of seed germination and overall plant growth is light.

== See also ==
- Lily seed germination types
- Oldest viable seed
- Pot farm
- Pyrophyte, for germination after fire
- Seed tray
- Seedling
- Sprouting
- Urban horticulture
- Vivipary, when seeds or embryos begin to develop inside or before they detach from the parent
