= Frits Warmolt Went =

Dutch botanist (1903–1990)

- Born: May 18, 1903; Utrecht
- Died: May 1, 1990 (aged 86); Little Valley, Nevada
- Occupation: Biologist
- Known for: Cholodny–Went model

Frits Warmolt Went (May 18, 1903 – May 1, 1990) was a Dutch biologist whose 1928 experiment demonstrated the existence of auxin in plants.

Went's father was the prominent Dutch botanist Friedrich August Ferdinand Christian Went. After graduating from the University of Utrecht, The Netherlands in 1927 with a dissertation on the effects of the plant hormone auxin, Went then worked as a plant pathologist in the research labs of the Royal Botanical Garden in Buitenzorg, Dutch East Indies (now Bogor, Indonesia) from 1927 to 1933. He then took a position at the California Institute of Technology (Caltech) in Pasadena, California, first researching plant hormones. His interest gradually shifted to environmental influences on plant growth. At Caltech, he was among the first to demonstrate the importance of hormones in plant growth and development. He played an important role in the development of synthetic plant hormones, which then became the basis of much of the agricultural chemical industry.

Frees is known for the Cholodny–Went model, named after Went and the Soviet scientist Nikolai Cholodny.

They proposed it in 1937, after coming independently to the same conclusions. This is an early model describing the phototropic and gravitropic properties of emerging shoots of monocotyledons. It proposes that auxin, a plant growth hormone, is synthesized in the coleoptile tip, which senses light or gravity and will send the auxin down the appropriate side of the shoot. This causes asymmetric growth of one side of the plant. As a result, the plant shoot will begin to bend toward a light source or toward the surface.

Funded by donors, Went constructed a series of greenhouses at Caltech in which he could vary light conditions, humidity, temperature, air quality and other variables. In 1949 this led to him to construct a large new complex of climate-controlled rooms called the Earhart Plant Research Laboratory, also known as the "phytotron." Here he produced foundational research of the effects of air pollution on plant growth.

In his 1960 article "Blue Haze in the Atmosphere" Went postulated the importance of biogenic volatile organic compounds emitted by forests for atmospheric new particle formation, which has been highly influential in the field of atmospheric chemistry. The blue haze is now known to be primarily a result of light scattering on secondary organic aerosols, generated via the partitioning of volatile organic chemicals in the atmosphere after successive oxidation and hence reduction in vapor pressure.

In 1958 Went was appointed director of the Missouri Botanical Garden and professor of botany at Washington University in St. Louis, at a point where he had become a world recognized authority on plant growth. He moved from Pasadena to St. Louis with his wife Catharina and their two children, Hans and Anneka. After the opening of the Climatron, the world's first geodesic dome greenhouse, Went's vision of a renewed Missouri Botanical Garden eventually came into conflict with that of its board of trustees, and he resigned as director in 1963. After two years as professor of botany at Washington University, in 1965 he then became director of the Desert Research Institute at the University of Nevada, Reno, where he continued his research on desert plants for the remainder of his career, and on occasion lectured in the department of biology. He remained active in many fields of botany until his death in 1990.
