= Random positioning machine =

Random Positioning Machine
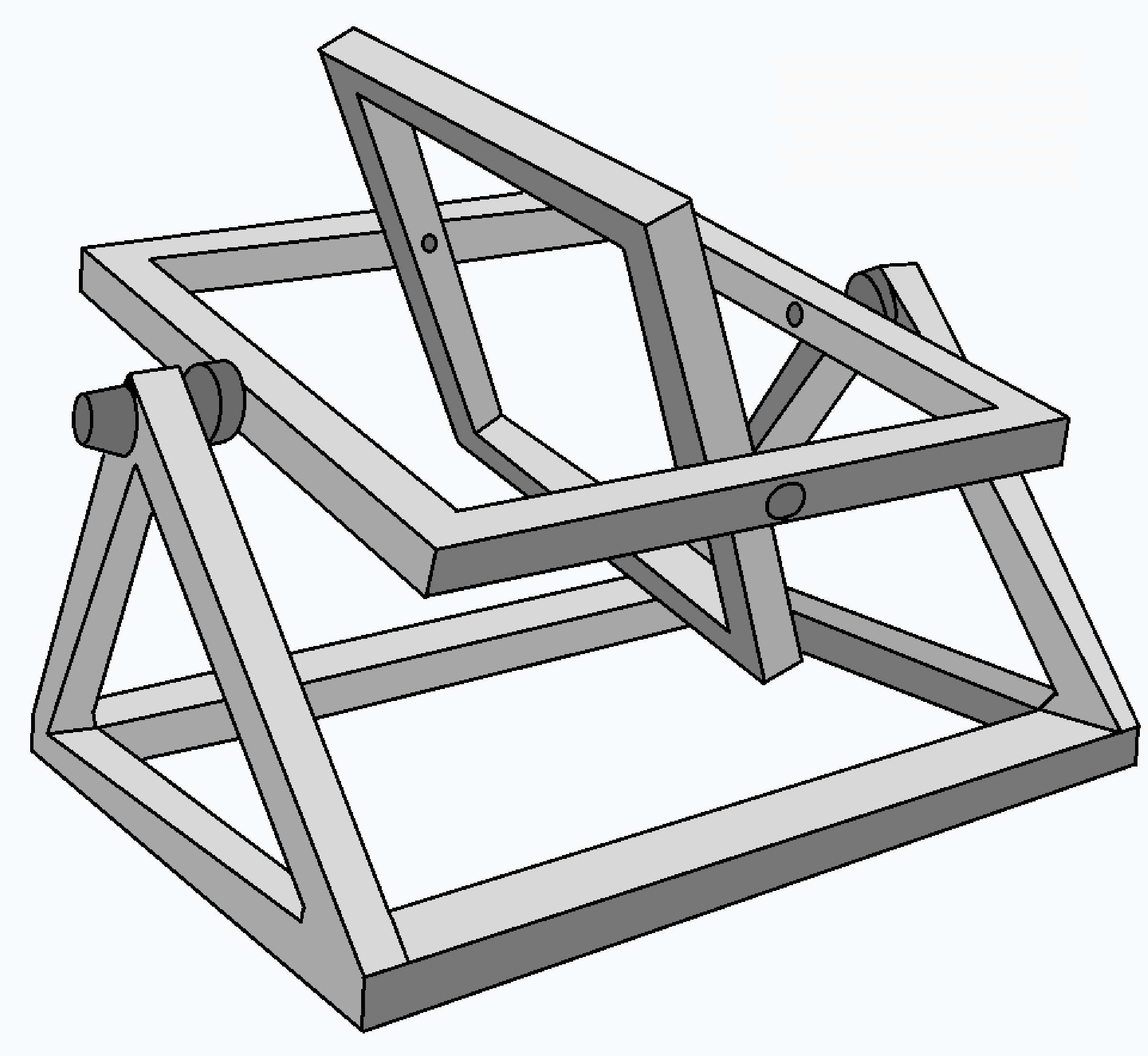
- Other names: 3D clinostat
- Uses: The RPM rotates biological samples around two independent axes to eliminate the effect of gravity.
- Related items: clinostat, free fall machine

A random positioning machine (RPM) is a mechanism that rotates biological samples along two independent axes to change their orientation in space in complex ways in order to eliminate the effect of gravity. RPMs are often used as an alternative to sub-orbital flights or drop towers in research studying the effects of weightlessness or microgravity on biological systems.

== Description ==
The RPM is a more sophisticated development of the single-axis clinostat. RPMs usually consist of two independently rotating frames. One frame is positioned inside the other giving a very complex net change of orientation to a biological sample mounted in the middle. The RPM is sometimes wrongly referred to as the "3-D clinostat" (which rotates both axes in the same direction, i.e. both clockwise). It is a microweight ('micro-gravity') simulator that is based on the principle of 'gravity-vector-averaging'. RPM provides a functional volume which is 'exposed' to simulated microweight.

== Simulated micro-, partial, and hyper gravity ==
The concept of 'random' positioning has been used to simulate a micro-gravity environment through the nullification of gravity. This is accomplished by disorientating the target model, or as "vector-averaging". Through the use of a centrifuge, a 'hyper-gravity' gravity can be simulated, as the model will get exposed to a continued accelerated force. In the circumstances of hyper-gravity within a micro-gravity environment, a partial 'Earth' gravity is created. Hyper-gravity simulation is also achieved through the use of larger centrifuges, such as the Large diameter Centrifuge (LDC) at the European Space Agency. The LDC is able to simulate up to twenty times the Earth's gravitational strength. A system developed by Airbus uses an algorithm to simulate partial-gravity through a not fully randomly vector-averaging. The vector-averaging by Airbus' algorithm doesn't average out the vector to null but to a percentage representing simulated partial-gravity.

== Disadvantages ==
The simulated microgravity environment attained inside the RPM is not perfect. A secondary effect part of this is the shear forces created by the fluid dynamics of the cell culture medium. They have been mathematically modeled by Wüest, and according to the research by Hauslage, they are of a magnitude enough to have biological implications. Also, Cortés-Sánchez showed these effects in mammalian cells cultured in the RPM.

== See also ==
- Drop tube
- Gravitropism
- Sub-orbital spaceflight
- Weightlessness
