= Free fall machine =

Mechanism designed to permit the development of small biological samples, such a

- Acronym: FFM
- Uses: Allows biological samples to develop in free fall, thus mitigating the effect of gravity.
- Inventor: D. Mesland
- Related items: Clinostat, Random positioning machine, Large diameter centrifuge

A free fall machine (FFM) is a mechanism designed to permit the development of small biological samples, such as cell cultures, with a simulated effect of micro-gravity under free fall conditions.

== Description ==
The free fall machine (FFM) addresses some of the problems of the simple horizontal clinostat or random positioning machines (RPM). In a typical machine samples are allowed to cycle between free fall for about a metre down a column (micro-gravity simulation, near "0 g") and a "bounce" back to the top of the column that is intended to be so fast (c. 20 g for 20 ms) that it is undetected by the biological sample. The sample therefore experiences an average gravity of near 0 g.

Long duration of hyper-gravity is often simulated by machines such as the large diameter centrifuge (LDC) at ESA. To simulate partial-gravity (between simulated 0 and Earth's gravity, 1, such as Mars or Moon gravitational strengths) conditions, an RPM can also be used.

== See also ==
- Clinostat
- Gravitropism
- Large Diameter Centrifuge
- Random Positioning Machine
