= Coleorhiza =

The coleorhiza or root sheath is a protective layer of tissue that surrounds the radicle (the embryonic primary root) in monocotyledon seeds. During germination, the coleorhiza is the first part to grow out of the seed, growing through cell elongation. Soon afterwards, it is pierced through by the emerging primary root and then remains like a collar around the root base. Also the adventitious roots have a coleorhiza.

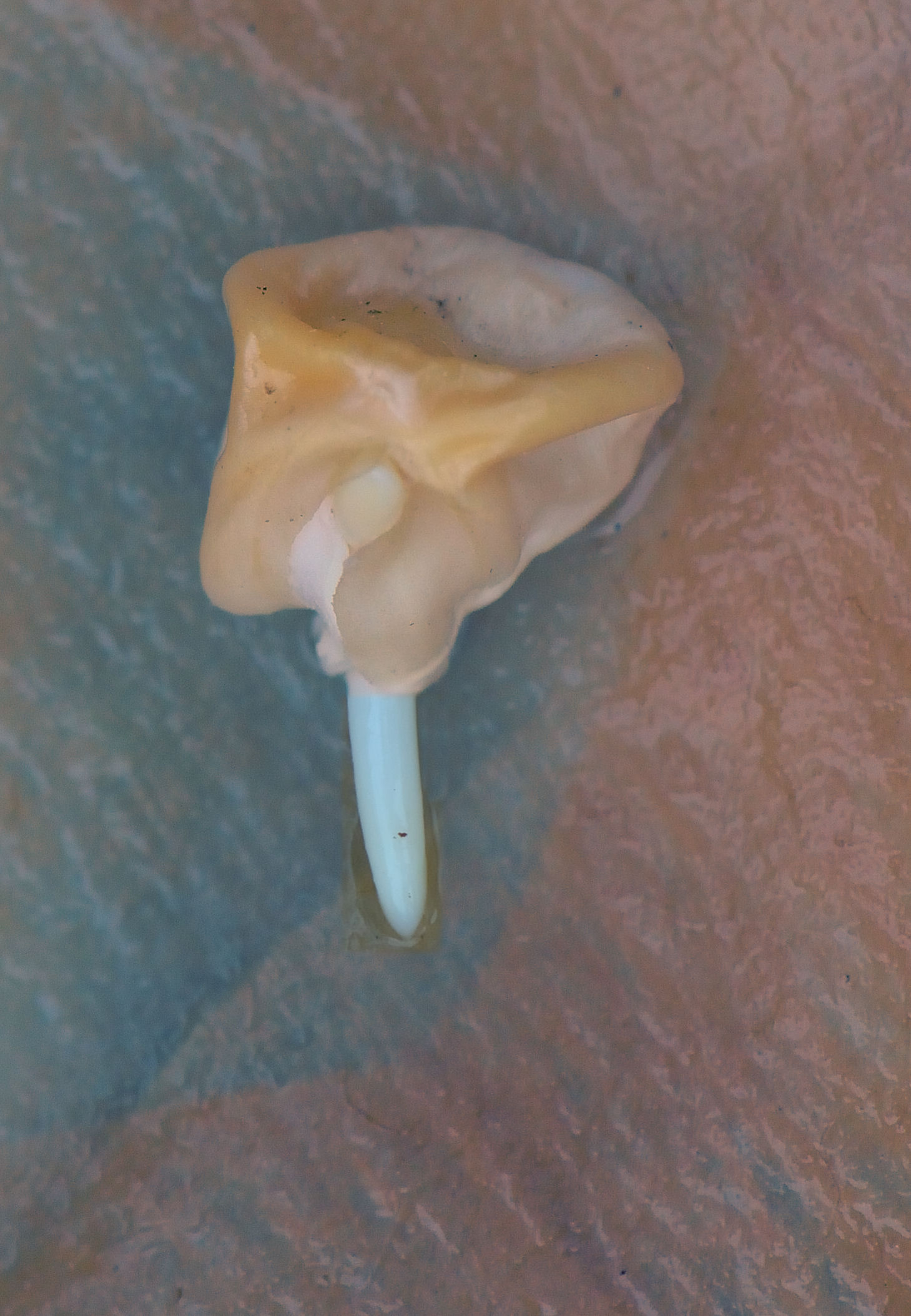
Coleorhiza with sweet corn

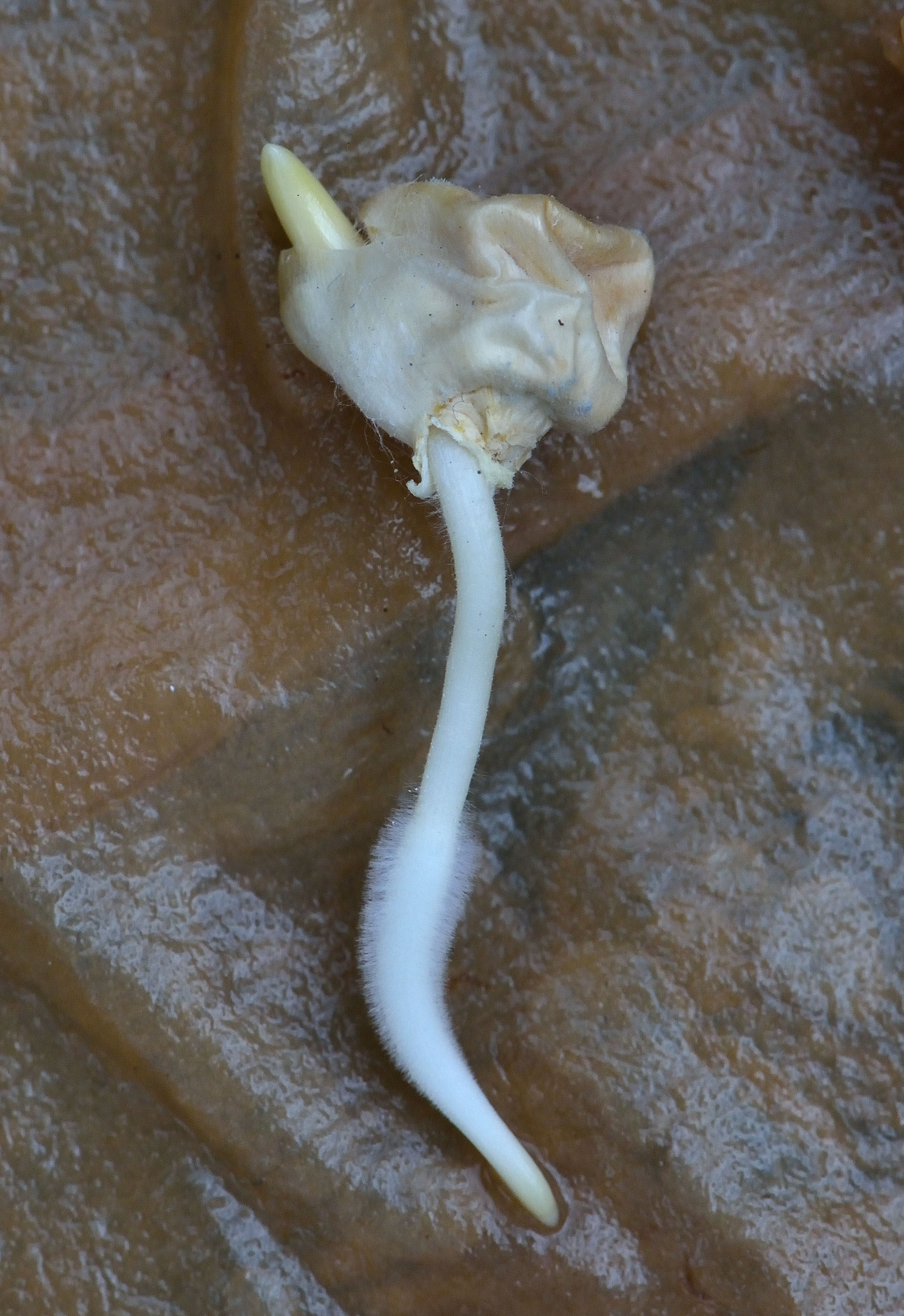
Collar of the coleorhiza and coleoptile with sweetcorn

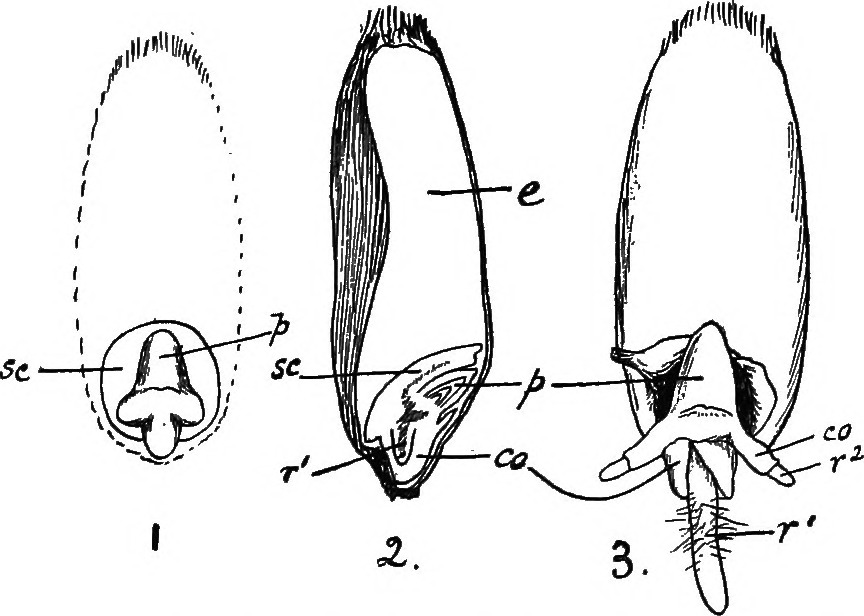
Grain of wheat. co = coleorhiza, r^{1} and r^{2} = root

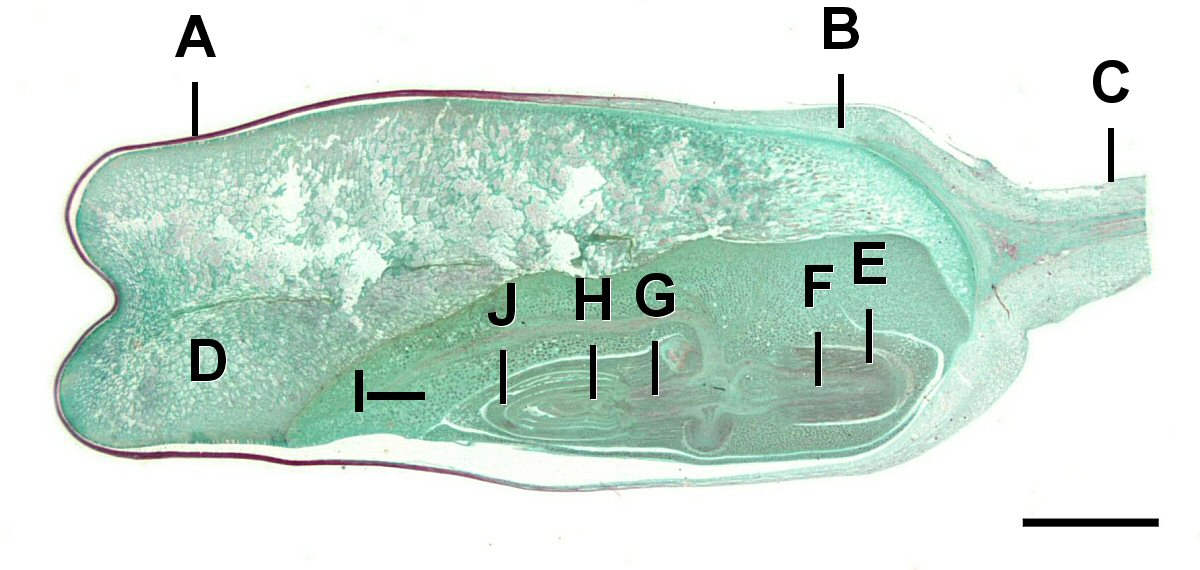
Corn grain length section, A=Pericarp, B=Aleurone, C=Tip cap, D=Endosperm, E=Coleorhiza, F=Radicle, G=Hypocotyl, H=Plumule, I=Scutellum, J=Coleoptile. Scale=1.4mm.

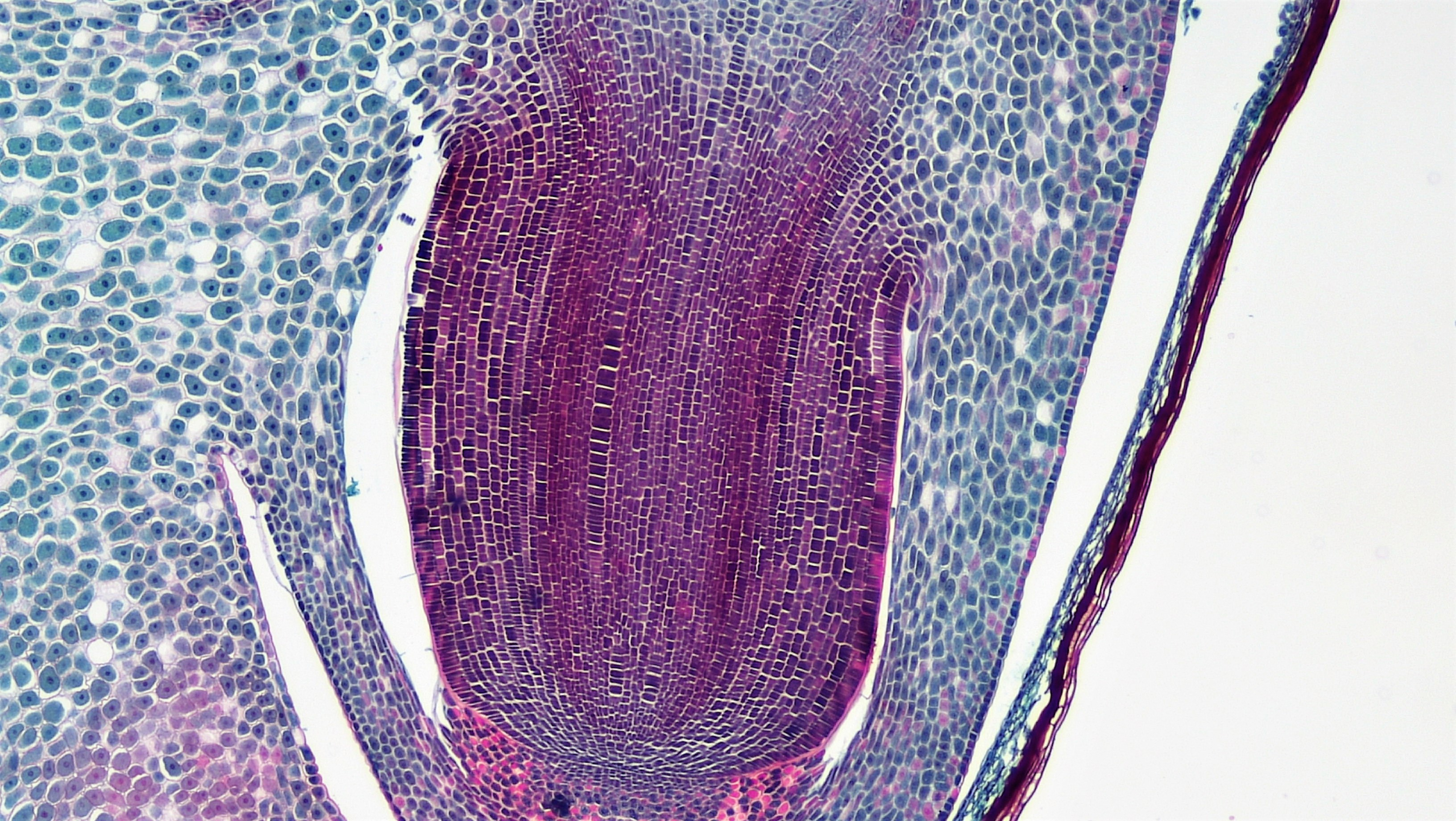
Root of corn with rootcap and coleorhiza
