= Clinostat =

Device which uses rotation to negate the effects of gravitational pull on plant growth

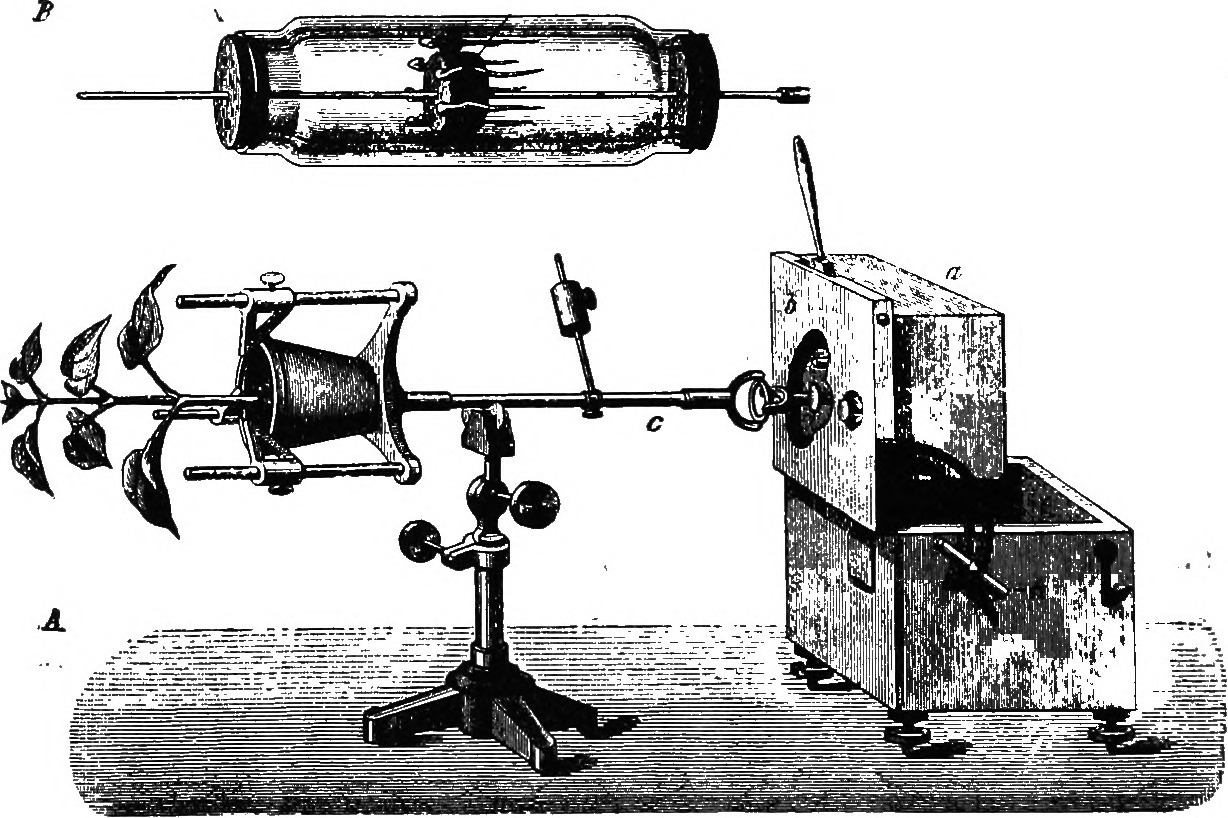
- Other names: Klinostat, horizontal clinostat, single axis clinostat
- Uses: reduces the effect of gravity on organisms, chiefly used with plants
- Inventor: Julius von Sachs
- Related items: random positioning machine

A clinostat is a device which uses rotation to negate the effects of gravitational pull on plant growth (gravitropism) and development (gravimorphism). It has also been used to study the effects of microgravity on cell cultures, microbial growth, animal embryos and spider webs.

== Description ==
A single-axis (or horizontal) clinostat consists of a disc attached to a motor. They were originally clockwork but nowadays an electric motor is used. The disc is held vertically and the motor rotates it slowly at rates in the order of one revolution per minute. A plant is attached to the disc so that it is held horizontally. The slow rotation means that the plant experiences a gravitational pull that is averaged over 360 degrees, thus approximating a weightless environment. Clinostats have also been used to cancel out effects of sunlight and other stimuli besides gravity. This type of clinostat must be exactly horizontal to simulate absence of gravity. If the clinostat is at an angle from horizontal, a net gravity vector is perceived, the magnitude of which depends on the angle. This can be used to simulate lunar gravity (ca. 1/6 g) which requires an angle from the horizontal of ca. 10 deg., i.e. sin^{−1}(1/6).

A plant only reacts to gravity if the gravistimulation is maintained for longer than a critical amount of time, called the minimal presentation time (MPT). For many plant organs the MPT lies somewhere between 10 and 200 seconds, and therefore a clinostat should rotate on a comparable timescale in order to avoid a gravitropic response. However, presentation time is cumulative, and if a clinostat's rotation is repeatedly stopped at a single position, even for periods as short as 0.5 s, a gravitropic response can result. The presentation time for animals is one or two orders of magnitude faster than this, thus precluding the use of the slow rotation clinostat for most animal studies. However the fast rotation clinostat can be, and is, used for the study of animal cell cultures and embryos.

== Types and application ==
- The usual type of clinostat turns slowly to avoid centrifugal effects and this is called the "slow rotation clinostat". There has been debate as to the most suitable speed of rotation: if it is too slow the plant has time to begin physiological responses to gravity; if it is too fast, centrifugal forces and mechanical strains introduce artifacts. The optimal rotational speed has been investigated by comparison to 'true' responses to microgravity as seen in space-grown plants, and determined to be between 0.3 and 3 rpm for most plant systems.
- The fast rotating clinostat (generally turning at between 30 and 150 rpm) can only be used for small samples (cell cultures in vials a few mm in diameter) typically in liquid media. Under these conditions excessive centrifugal effects, which precludes its use on larger samples, are avoided.
- A single-axis clinostat only produces the effect of weightlessness along its axis of rotation. A 3D or two-axis clinostat (generally called a random positioning machine or RPM), can average gravitational pull over all directions. These machines often consist of two frames, one positioned inside the other, each rotating independently.
- An alternative to the clinostat for simulating microgravity is the free fall machine (FFM). Small samples (such as cell suspensions) are allowed to free fall under gravity for about a metre, with the period of free fall lasting just under a second. They are then pushed back to the top of the apparatus by a briefly applied large force (c. 20 g for 20 ms - the "bounce"), and allowed to fall again, and so on. The principle of the machine is that most of the time is spent in zero g free fall. The periods spent under high g are assumed to be too short to be detected by the physiological mechanism of the biological samples, which consequently only perceive the time spent in free fall.

== Problems associated with the use of the horizontal clinostat ==
A number of problems have been pointed out in the use of clinostats to simulate microgravity:

- gravitational effects still occur, they just have no net direction. Therefore rather than simulating microgravity they are best thought of as inducing omnilateral gravistimulation
- leaves of large plants flop about as they rotate; this may cause an increase in ethylene production, which may in turn cause some of the phenomena otherwise attributed to agravitropism. Other researchers have questioned this interpretation, and it has been suggested that ethylene may have a role in the gravitropic response
- vibration from the motor and other motion effects may lead to artifacts.

== History ==
The clinostat was invented in 1879 by Julius von Sachs, who built a clockwork-powered machine. However a similar concept had been pioneered as early as 1703 by Denis Dodart. The first electric-powered clinostat (1897) was made by Newcombe.

== See also ==
- Gravitropism
- Large diameter centrifuge
- Random positioning machine
- Free fall machine

== Citations ==
- Barjaktarović, Z.; Nordheim, A; Lamkemeyer, T; Fladerer, C; Madlung, J; Hampp, R; et al. (2007), "Time-course of changes in amounts of specific proteins upon exposure to hyper-g, 2-D clinorotation, and 3-D random positioning of Arabidopsis cell cultures", J Exp Bot., vol. 58, no. 15–16, pp. 4357–63, doi:10.1093/jxb/erm302, PMID 18182437
