= Frits Went =

Dutch botanist

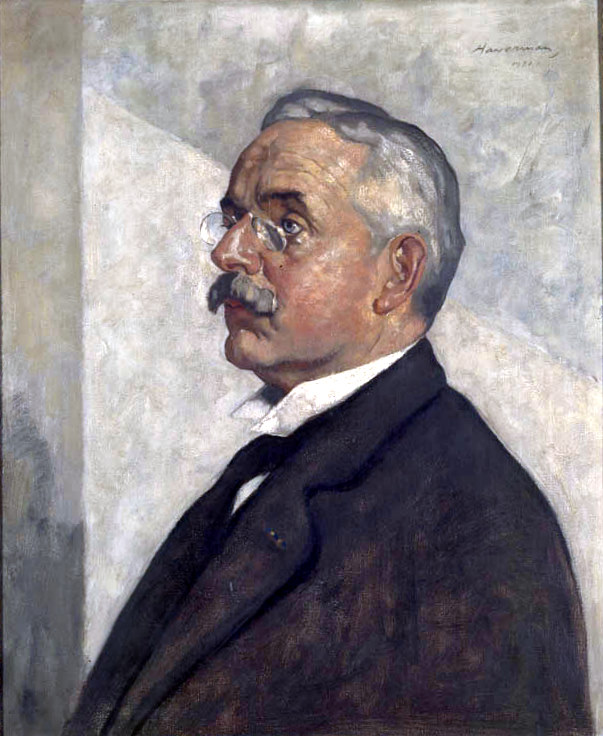
Frits Went

Friedrich August Ferdinand Christian Went ForMemRS (June 18, 1863 – July 24, 1935) was a Dutch botanist.

Went was born in Amsterdam. He was professor of botany and director of the Botanical Garden at the University of Utrecht. His eldest son was the Dutch botanist Frits Warmolt Went, who in 1927 as a graduate student worked on plant hormones, specifically the role of auxin in phototropism.

He became member of the Royal Netherlands Academy of Arts and Sciences in 1898.

Went died aged 72 in Wassenaar.
