= Gravitropism =

Plant growth in reaction to gravity and bending of leaves and roots

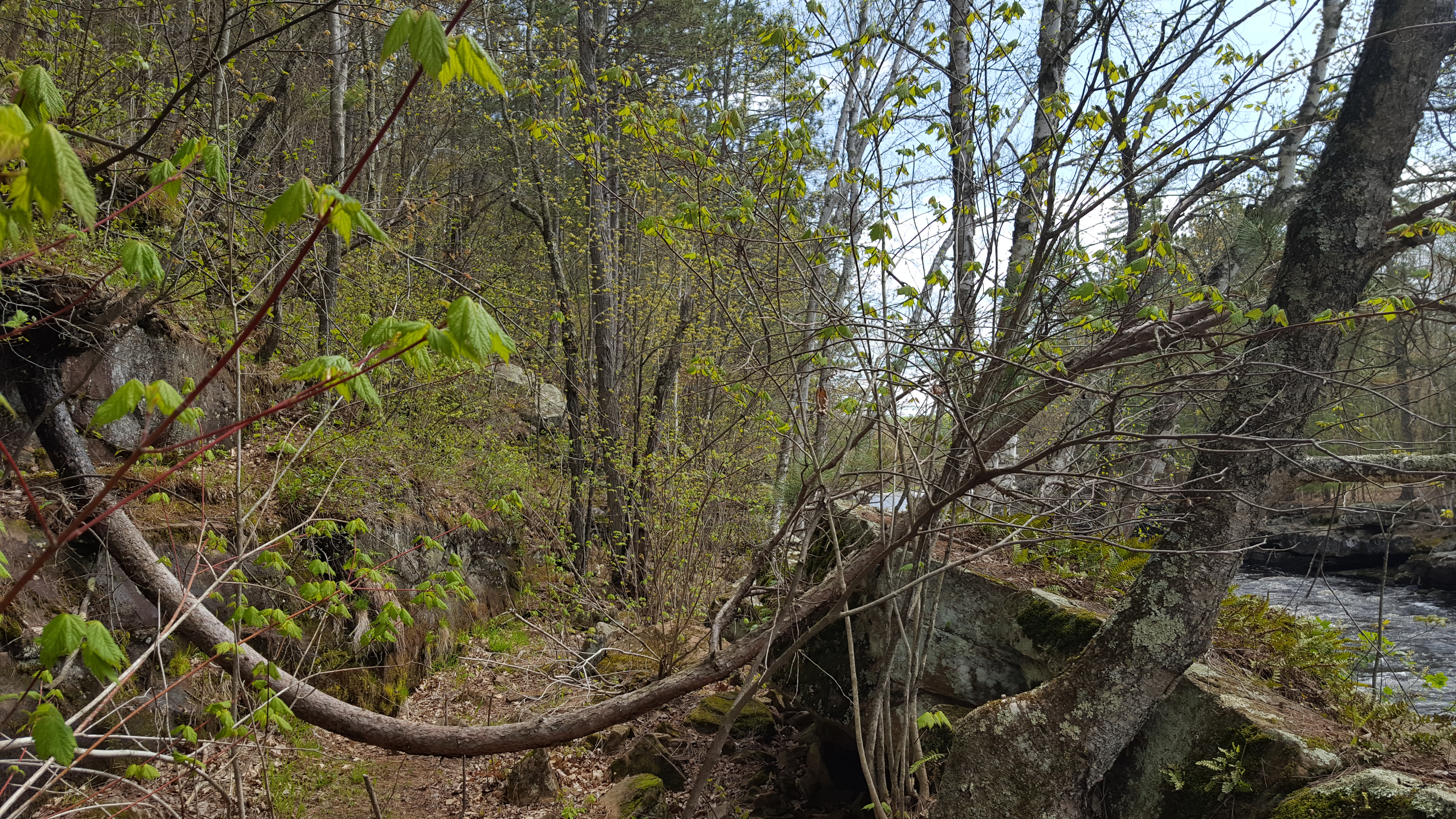
Example of gravitropism in a tree from central Minnesota. This tree has fallen over and due to gravitropism exhibits this arched growth.

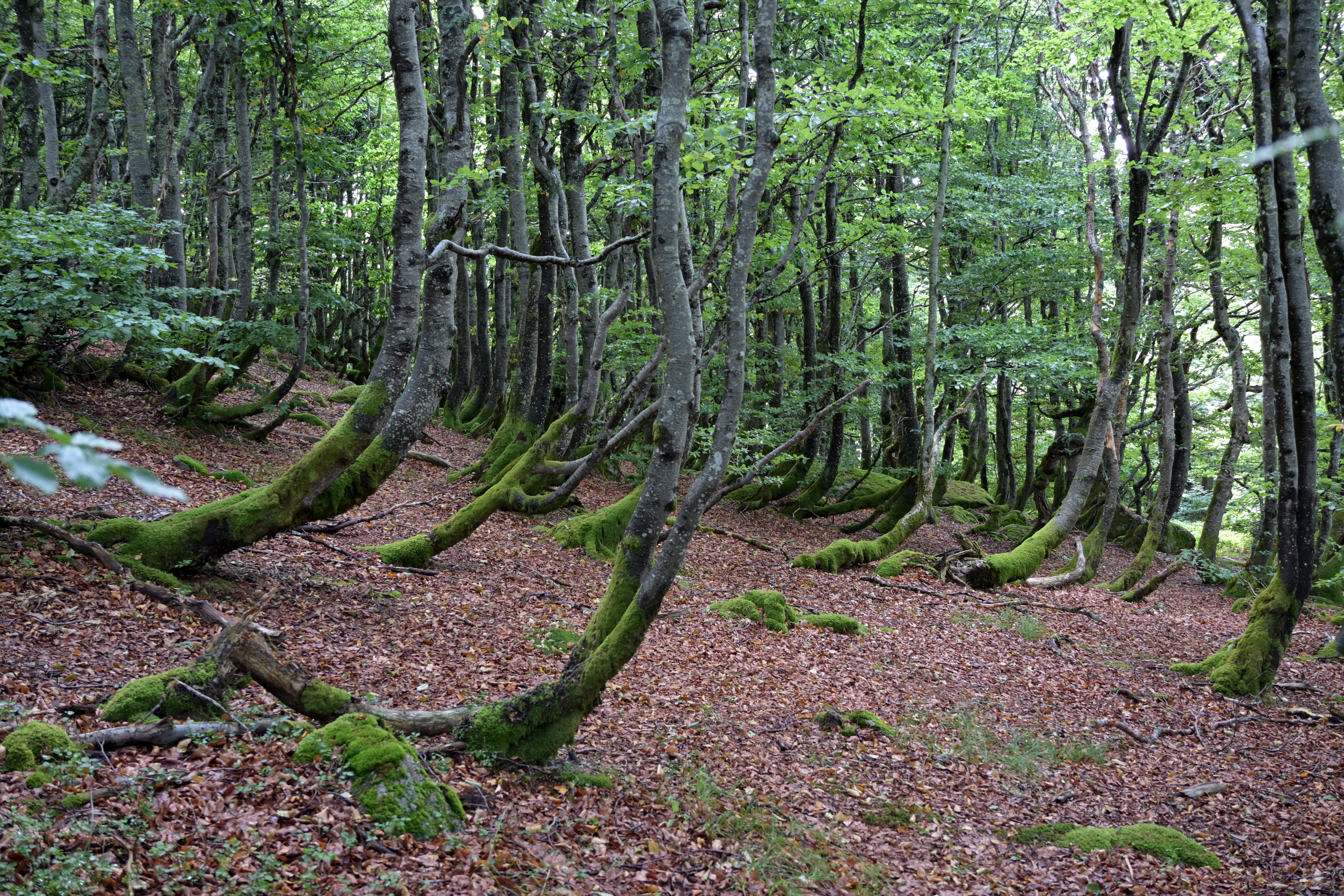
Gravitropism maintains vertical orientation of these trees. These trees, typical of those in steep subalpine environments, are covered by deep snow in winter. As small saplings they are overwhelmed by the snow and bent nearly flat to the ground. During spring growth, and more so as larger trees, gravitropism allows them to orient vertically over years of subsequent growth.

Gravitropism (also known as geotropism) is a coordinated process of differential growth by a plant in response to gravity pulling on it. It also occurs in fungi. Gravity can be either artificial gravity or natural gravity. It is a general feature of all higher and many lower plants as well as other organisms. Charles Darwin was one of the first to scientifically document that roots show positive gravitropism and stems show negative gravitropism. That is, roots grow in the direction of gravitational pull (i.e., downward) and stems grow in the opposite direction (i.e., upwards). This behavior can be easily demonstrated with any potted plant. When laid onto its side, the growing parts of the stem begin to display negative gravitropism, growing (biologists say, turning; see tropism) upwards. Herbaceous (non-woody) stems are capable of a degree of actual bending, but most of the redirected movement occurs as a consequence of root or stem growth outside. The mechanism is based on the Cholodny–Went model which was proposed in 1927, and has since been modified. Although the model has been criticized and continues to be refined, it has largely stood the test of time.

== In roots ==
In the process of plant roots growing in the direction of gravity by gravitropism, high concentrations of auxin move towards the cells on the bottom side of the root. This suppresses growth on this side, while allowing cell elongation on the top of the root. As a consequence of this, curved growth occurs and the root is directed downwards.

Root growth occurs by division of stem cells in the root meristem located in the tip of the root, and the subsequent asymmetric expansion of cells in a shoot-ward region to the tip known as the elongation zone. Differential growth during tropisms mainly involves changes in cell expansion versus changes in cell division, although a role for cell division in tropic growth has not been formally ruled out. Gravity is sensed in the root tip and this information must then be relayed to the elongation zone so as to maintain growth direction and mount effective growth responses to changes in orientation to and continue to grow its roots in the same direction as gravity.

Abundant evidence demonstrates that roots bend in response to gravity due to a regulated movement of the plant hormone auxin known as polar auxin transport. This was described in the 1920s in the Cholodny-Went model. The model was independently proposed by the Ukrainian scientist N. Cholodny of the University of Kyiv in 1927 and by Frits Went of the California Institute of Technology in 1928, both based on work they had done in 1926. Auxin exists in nearly every organ and tissue of a plant, but it has been reoriented in the gravity field, can initiate differential growth resulting in root curvature.

Experiments show that auxin distribution is characterized by a fast movement of auxin to the lower side of the root in response to a gravity stimulus at a 90° degree angle or more. However, once the root tip reaches a 40° angle to the horizontal of the stimulus, auxin distribution quickly shifts to a more symmetrical arrangement. This behavior is described as a "tipping point" mechanism for auxin transport in response to a gravitational stimulus.

== In shoots ==

Gravitropism is an integral part of plant growth, orienting its position to maximize contact with sunlight, as well as ensuring that the roots are growing in the correct direction. Growth due to gravitropism is mediated by changes in concentration of the plant hormone auxin within plant cells.

In the process of plant shoots growing opposite the direction of gravity by gravitropism, high concentration of auxin moves towards the bottom side of the shoot to initiate cell growth of the bottom cells, while suppressing cell growth on the top of the shoot. This allows the bottom cells of the shoot to continue a curved growth and elongate its cells upward, away from the pull of gravity as the auxin move towards the bottom of the shoot.

As plants mature, gravitropism continues to guide growth and development along with phototropism. While amyloplasts continue to guide plants in the right direction, plant organs and function rely on phototropic responses to ensure that the leaves are receiving enough light to perform basic functions such as photosynthesis. In complete darkness, mature plants have little to no sense of gravity, unlike seedlings that can still orient themselves to have the shoots grow upward until light is reached when development can begin.

Differential sensitivity to auxin helps explain Darwin's original observation that stems and roots respond in the opposite way to the forces of gravity. In both roots and stems, auxin accumulates towards the gravity vector on the lower side. In roots, this results in the inhibition of cell expansion on the lower side and the concomitant curvature of the roots towards gravity (positive gravitropism). In stems, the auxin also accumulates on the lower side, however in this tissue it increases cell expansion and results in the shoot curving up (negative gravitropism).

A recent study showed that for gravitropism to occur in shoots, a lot of an inclination, instead of a weak gravitational force, is necessary. This finding sets aside gravity sensing mechanisms that would rely on detecting the pressure of the weight of statoliths.

== In fruit ==
A few species of fruit exhibit negative geotropism. Bananas are one well-known example. Once the canopy that covers the fruit dries, the bananas will begin to curve upwards, towards sunlight, in what is known as phototropism. Like other plant tissues' response to gravity, the upward curvature of the banana fruit is mediated by auxin. When the banana is first exposed to sunlight after the leaf canopy dries, one face of the fruit is shaded. On exposure to sunlight, auxin in the banana migrates from the sunlight side to the shaded side. Since auxin is a powerful plant growth hormone, the increased concentration promotes cell division and causes the plant cells on the shaded side to grow. This asymmetrical distribution of auxin is responsible for the upward curvature of the banana.

== Gravity-sensing mechanisms ==
=== Statoliths ===
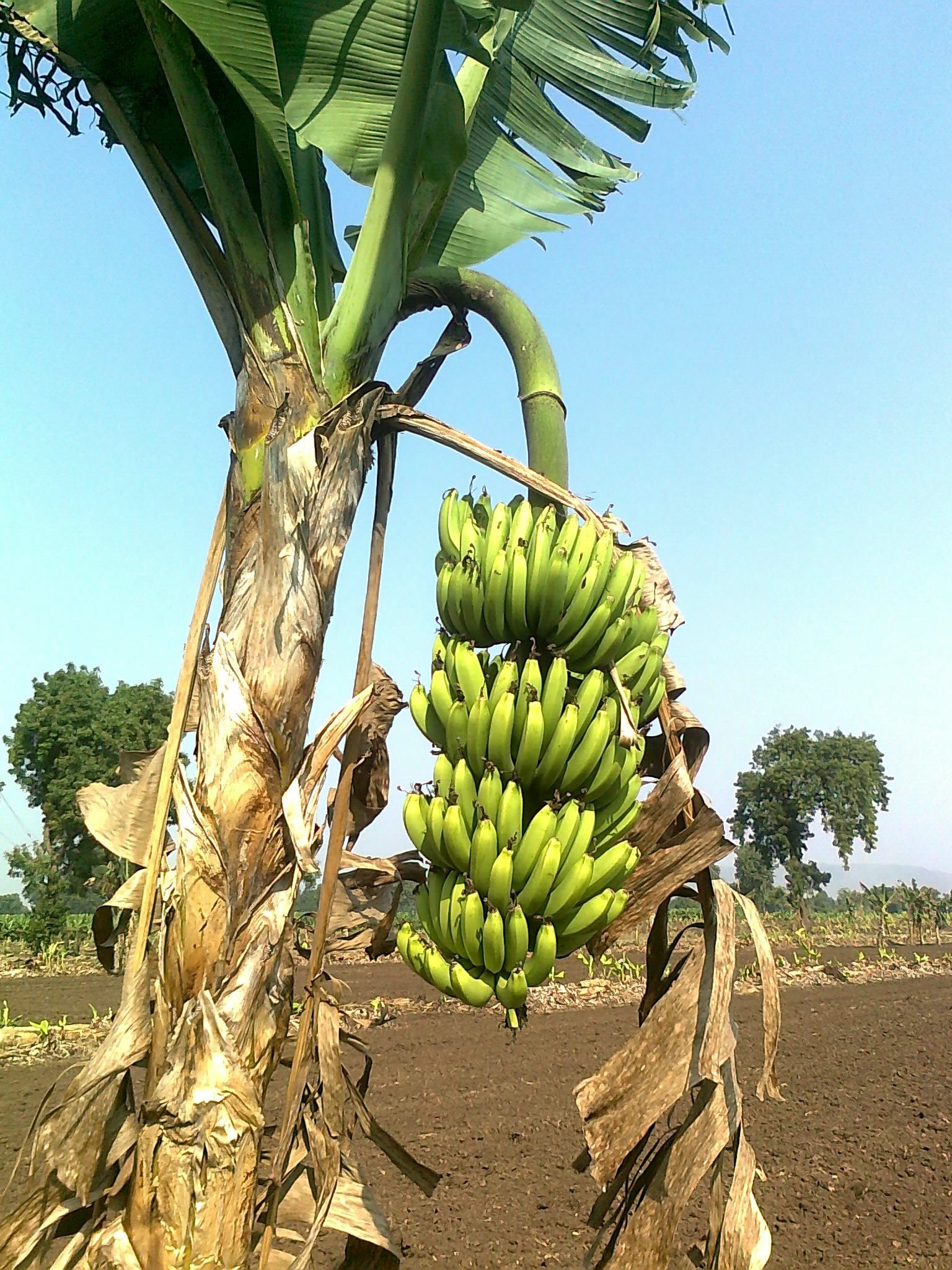
Banana fruit exhibiting negative geotropism.

Plants possess the ability to sense gravity in several ways, one of which is through dense amyloplasts called statoliths, which are organelles that synthesize and store starch and which collect in specialized cells called statocytes. Statocytes are located in the starch parenchyma cells near vascular tissues in the shoots and in the columella in the caps of the roots. These specialized amyloplasts are denser than the cytoplasm and can sediment according to the gravity vector. The statoliths are enmeshed in a web of actin and it is thought that their sedimentation transmits the gravitropic signal by activating mechanosensitive channels. The gravitropic signal then leads to the reorientation of auxin efflux carriers and subsequent redistribution of auxin streams in the root cap and root as a whole. Auxin moves toward higher concentrations on the bottom side of the root and suppresses elongation. The asymmetric distribution of auxin leads to differential growth of the root tissues, causing the root to curve and follow the gravity stimuli. Statoliths are also found in the endodermic layer of the hypocotyl, stem, and inflorescence stock. The redistribution of auxin causes increased growth on the lower side of the shoot so that it orients in a direction opposite that of the gravity stimuli.

=== Modulation by phytochrome ===
Some aspects of plant development are influenced to change by photoreceptors called phytochromes that are sensitive to light of red and far-red wavelengths. And apart from its direct (phototropic) effect, light may also suppress the gravitropic reaction. In seedlings, red and far-red light both inhibit negative gravitropism in seedling hypocotyls (the shoot area below the cotyledons) causing growth in random directions. However, the hypocotyls readily orient towards blue light. This process may be caused by phytochrome disrupting the formation of starch-filled endodermal amyloplasts and stimulating their conversion to other plastid types, such as chloroplasts or etiolaplasts.

== Compensation ==
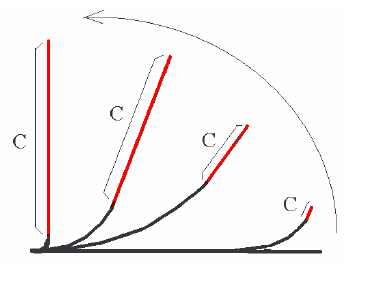
The compensation reaction of the bending Coprinus stem. C – the compensating part of the stem.

Bending mushroom stems follow some regularities that are not common in plants. After turning into horizontal the normal vertical orientation the apical part (region C in the figure below) starts to straighten. Finally this part gets straight again, and the curvature concentrates near the base of the mushroom. This effect is called compensation (or sometimes, autotropism). The exact reason of such behavior is unclear, and at least two hypotheses exist.

- The hypothesis of plagiogravitropic reaction supposes some mechanism that sets the optimal orientation angle other than 90 degrees (vertical). The actual optimal angle is a multi-parameter function, depending on time, the current reorientation angle and from the distance to the base of the fungi. The mathematical model, written following this suggestion, can simulate bending from the horizontal into vertical position but fails to imitate realistic behavior when bending from the arbitrary reorientation angle (with unchanged model parameters).
- The alternative model supposes some "straightening signal", proportional to the local curvature. When the tip angle approaches 30° this signal overcomes the bending signal, caused by reorientation, straightening resulting.

Both models fit the initial data well, but the latter was also able to predict bending from various reorientation angles. Compensation is less obvious in plants, but in some cases it can be observed combining exact measurements with mathematical models. The more sensitive roots are stimulated by lower levels of auxin; higher levels of auxin in lower halves stimulate less growth, resulting in downward curvature (positive gravitropism).

== Gravitropic mutants ==
Mutants with altered responses to gravity have been isolated in several plant species including Arabidopsis thaliana (one of the genetic model systems used for plant research). These mutants have alterations in either negative gravitropism in hypocotyls and/or shoots, or positive gravitropism in roots, or both. Mutants have been identified with varying effects on the gravitropic responses in each organ, including mutants which nearly eliminate gravitropic growth, and those whose effects are weak or conditional. In the same way that gravity has an effect on winding and circumnutating, thus aspects of morphogenesis have defects on the mutant. Once a mutant has been identified, it can be studied to determine the nature of the defect (the particular difference(s) it has compared to the non-mutant 'wildtype'). This can provide information about the function of the altered gene, and often about the process under study. In addition the mutated gene can be identified, and thus something about its function inferred from the mutant phenotype.

Gravitropic mutants have been identified that affect starch accumulation, such as those affecting the PGM1 (which encodes the enzyme phosphoglucomutase) gene in Arabidopsis, causing plastids – the presumptive statoliths – to be less dense and, in support of the starch-statolith hypothesis, less sensitive to gravity. Other examples of gravitropic mutants include those affecting the transport or response to the hormone auxin. In addition to the information about gravitropism which such auxin-transport or auxin-response mutants provide, they have been instrumental in identifying the mechanisms governing the transport and cellular action of auxin as well as its effects on growth.

There are also several cultivated plants that display altered gravitropism compared to other species or to other varieties within their own species. Some are trees that have a weeping or pendulate growth habit; the branches still respond to gravity, but with a positive response, rather than the normal negative response. Others are the lazy (i.e. ageotropic or agravitropic) varieties of corn (Zea mays) and varieties of rice, barley and tomatoes, whose shoots grow along the ground.

== See also ==
- Amyloplast – starch organelle involved in sensing gravitropism
- Astrobotany – the field of science concerned with plants in a spaceflight environment
- Clinostat – a device used to negate the effects of gravitational pull by single-axis rotation
- Random positioning machine – a device used to negate the effects of gravitational pull by multi-axis rotation
- Free fall machine – a device used to negate the effects of gravitational pull by simulating microgravity
- Large diameter centrifuge – a device used to create a hyper-gravity pull
- Prolonged sine – reaction of plants to turning from their usual vertical orientation
- Phototropism – growth of a plant in response to a light stimulus
