= Large diameter centrifuge =

Specialized centrifuge device

Large Diameter Centrifuge
- Acronym: LDC
- Uses: rotates both biological and non biological samples to enhance the effect of gravity given in a certain space.
- Related items: clinostat, free fall machine, Random positioning machine

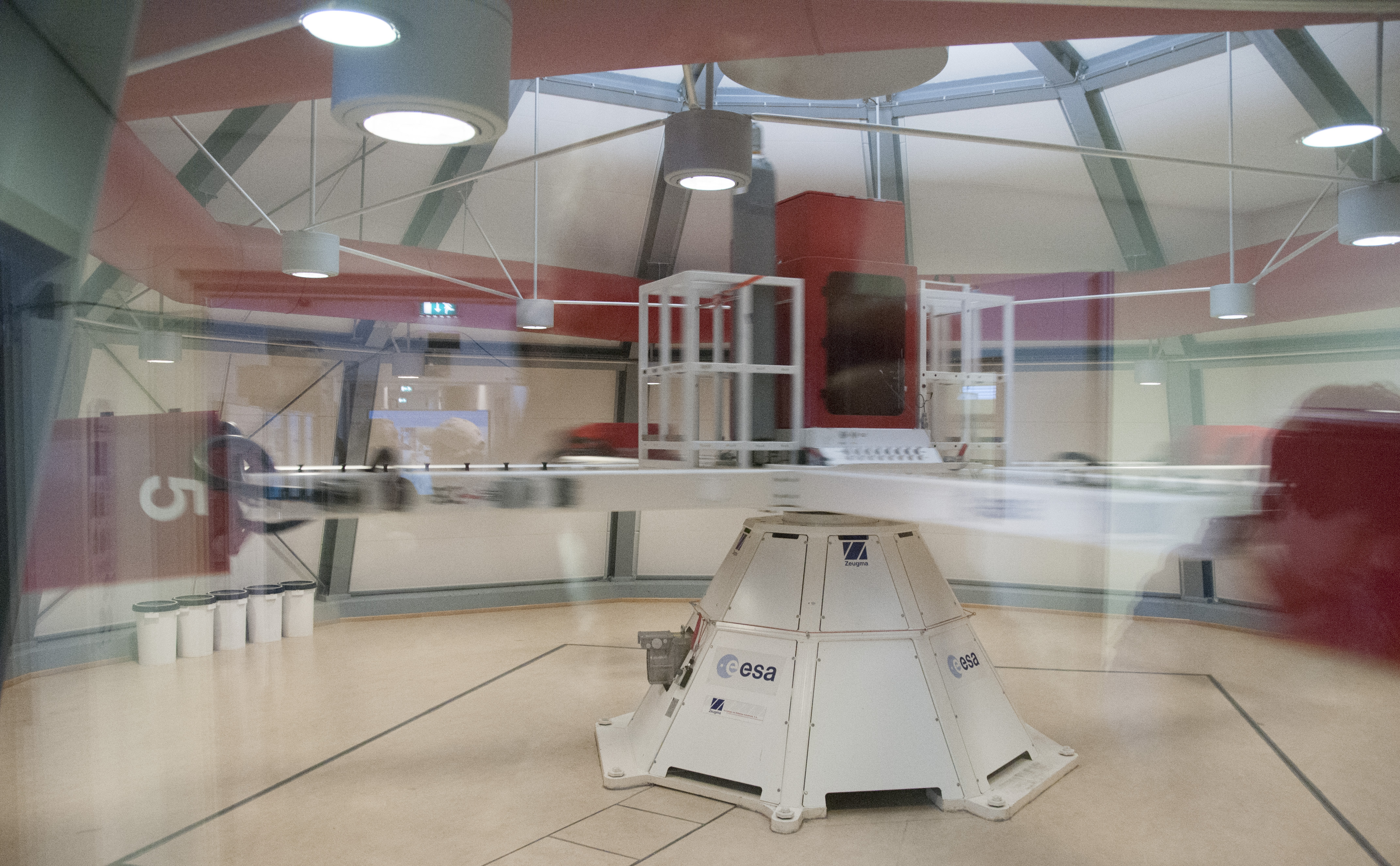
Large Diameter Centrifuge (LDC) also referred simply as Space Centrifuge in operation. Used for non-human research, rated at 20 g max. This facility is located in a dome at ESA / ESTEC, Noordwijk, Netherlands.

The large diameter centrifuge, or LDC, is any centrifuge extending several meters, which can rotate samples to change their acceleration in space to enhance the effect of gravity. Large diameter centrifuges are used to understand the effect of hyper-gravity (gravitational strengths stronger than that of the Earth) on biological samples, including and not limiting to plants, organs, bacteria, and astronauts (Such as NASA's Human Performance Centrifuge) or non-biological samples to undertake experiments in the field of fluid dynamics, geology, biochemistry and more.

== ESTEC LDC ==
=== Description ===
Frequently, "LDC" is used to refer to the centrifuge at the European Space Agency (ESA)'s campus known as ESTEC (European Space research and TEChnology center). This is an 8-m diameter, four-arm centrifuge covered by a dome, which is available for research. A total of six gondolas, each being able to carry an 80 kg payload, can spin at a maximum of 20 times Earth's gravity, equaling 67 revolutions per minute. Full technical specification are available for free at the ESA website.

==== Competition and grants ====
The European Space Agency (ESA) and UNOOSA lets students compete with a research proposal for the use of the LDC. These competitions are known as the 'Spin Your thesis!'. When the proposal is accepted, they are guided at ESA/ESTEC to use the LDC. Support is given for a variety of different fields including biology, physics and chemistry.

== See also ==
- Gravitropism
- Random positioning machine
- Free Fall Machine
- Clinostat
