= Photoblasticism =

Requirement of light for certain types of seeds to germinate

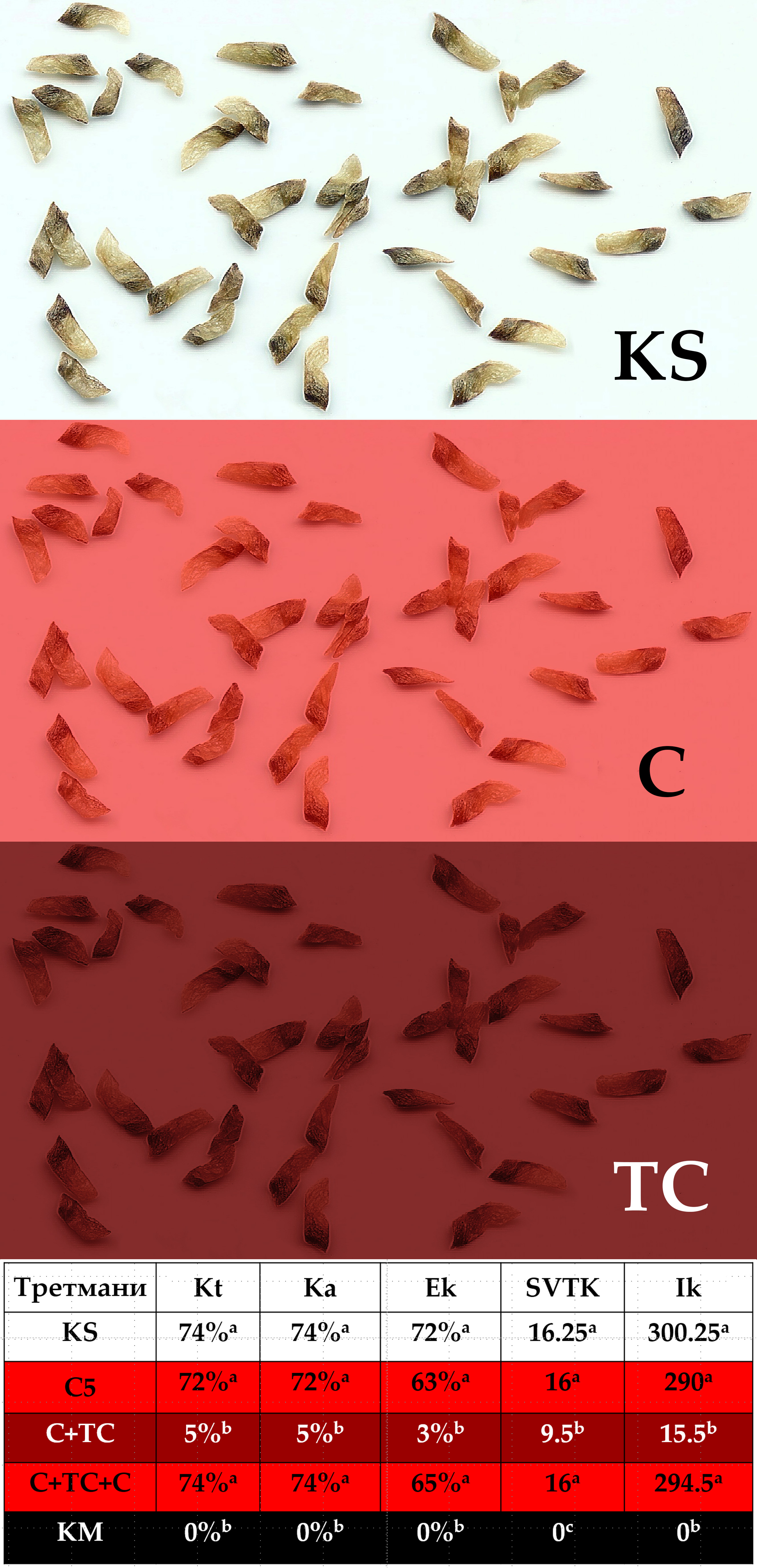
Photoblastic response of Japanese katsura tree seed germination

Photoblasticism is a mechanism of seed dormancy. Photoblastic seeds require light in order to germinate. Once germination starts, the stored nutrients that have accumulated during maturation start to be digested which then supports cell expansion and overall growth. Within light-stimulated germination, Phytochrome B (PHYB) is the photoreceptor that is responsible for the beginning stages of germination. When red light is present, PHYB is converted to its active form and moves from the cytoplasm to the nucleus where it upregulates the degradation of PIF1. PIF1, phytochrome-interaction-factor-1, negatively regulates germination by increasing the expression of proteins that repress the synthesis of gibberellin (GA), a major hormone in the germination process. Another factor that promotes germination is HFR1 which accumulates in light in some way and forms inactive heterodimers with PIF1.

Although the exact mechanism is not known, nitric oxide (NO) plays a role in this pathway as well. NO is thought to repress PIF1 gene expression and stabilises HFR1 in some way to support the start of germination. Bethke et al. (2006) exposed dormant Arabidopsis seeds to NO gas and within the next 4 days, 90% of the seeds broke dormancy and germinated. The authors also looked at how NO and GA effects the vacuolation process of aleurone cells that allow the movement of nutrients to be digested. A NO mutant resulted in inhibition of vacuolation but when GA was later added the process was active again leading to the belief that NO is prior to GA in the pathway. NO may also lead to the decrease in sensitivity of Abscisic acid (ABA), a plant hormone largely responsible for seed dormancy. The balance between GA and ABA is important. When ABA levels are higher than GA then that leads to dormant seeds and when GA levels are higher, seeds germinate. GA known to substitute the requirement of light for germination in positive photoblastic seeds.
