= Cholodny–Went model =

Botany model

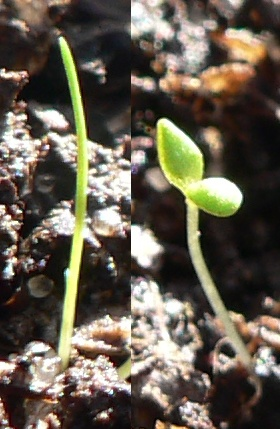
Image of a monocot and dicot sprouting away from the earth, toward the sun

In botany, the Cholodny–Went model, proposed in 1927, is an early model describing tropism in emerging shoots of monocotyledons, including the tendencies for the shoot to grow towards the light (phototropism) and the roots to grow downward (gravitropism). In both cases the directional growth is considered to be due to asymmetrical distribution of auxin, a plant growth hormone. Although the model has been criticized and continues to be refined, it has largely stood the test of time.

== Basic model ==
The model was independently proposed by the Russian-born scientist Nikolai Cholodny of the University of Kiev in the Ukrainian SSR of the Soviet Union, in 1927 and by Frits Warmolt Went of the California Institute of Technology in 1928, both based on work they had done in 1926. The basic elements of the theory are that auxin is the sole hormone that controls growth in gravitropism and phototropism; the rate of growth depends on the concentration of auxin; and both gravity and unidirectional light affect the movement of auxin. The original theory predicts that since the growth factor would move from the lighted side to the shady side, growth would slow on the lighted side and speed up on the shady side, so the stem would begin to bend toward the light source.

Went's 1926 experiment appeared to demonstrate that auxin moved towards the shady side of the tip of the coleoptile, the pointed protective sheath covering the emerging shoot. Cholodny and Went proposed that auxin is synthesized in the coleoptile tip, which senses light and sends the auxin down the shady side of the coleoptile, causing asymmetric growth with the shoot bending towards the light source. Later experiments by Dolk in 1930 showed that auxin moved from a source along a horizontal coleoptile section, concentrating along the bottom of the section and thus causing the shoot to bend upward. The Cholodny–Went model for the phototropic movement of shoots was later extended to gravitropism of roots, where auxin was thought to inhibit rather than stimulate growth and to accumulate in the lower side of a root section, causing the root to bend downward.

== Criticism ==
The theory was widely accepted when first proposed, but began to receive serious criticism in the mid-1980s. Arguments against the model have included views that growth regulators other than auxin may be involved, and that there is no difference in the concentration of auxin on the light and shady sides, or not enough difference to explain the difference in growth rates. A 1987 paper reported results indicating that geotropic curvature of both roots and shoots could be explained by local migration of auxin from one side to another rather than by movement along the whole length of the organ. Other studies showed that sometimes tropic responses do not depend on the coleoptile tip, and the development of the shoots' bend may be greater than the auxin gradient of that shoot. Critics have also had problems with the reliability of Went's small sample sizes and use of agar blocks instead of actual auxin concentration measurements.

== Support ==
Evidence that supports Cholodny–Went over competing theories was reported by Iino and Briggs in 1984, showing that there was decreased growth on the lighted side of a corn coleoptile and increased growth of the shaded side. Experiments on Arabidopsis thaliana in 1993 following a similar methodology gave similar results, and these have been backed up by direct measurements of auxin distribution. Other theories predict slower growth on both sides, but particularly on the lighted side (Blaauw/Paal 1918/1919), or faster growth on the shaded side but no change in growth on the lighted side (Boysen Jensen 1928).

Experiments with tomato seedlings in 1989 by Harrison and Pickard led to the conclusion that the mechanism was also valid for dicotyledons. In 1990–1991 Moritoshi Iino in Tokyo made measurements of IAA (auxin) in maize coleoptiles in response to both light and gravity. He confirmed that auxin was redistributed to the shady or lower side, and that bending occurred progressively as the auxin moved down the coleoptile. A 1993 report gave evidence that growth rates were changing on both the light and shady sides, as predicted. Experiments in the late 1990s with radiolabelled IAA (auxin, indole-3-acetic acid) supported the view that auxin synthesized in the tip of the coleoptile was being transported to the bottom side of the coleoptile, causing it to curve upward. A study of Arabidopsis reported in 2000 showed that basipetal (from the tip) transport of auxin controlled gravitropic responses in the roots of these plants. One of the main arguments against the Cholodny-Went hypothesis was removed when it was reported in 2003 that even when there was an exogenous source of auxin an endogenous gradient could develop.

However, there are indications that the model is not complete. The auxin gradient may not be relevant to early phases of graviresponse in roots, and it seems that the gravitropic response of shoots only involves local movement of auxin. Further research into phototropism and gravitropism is now investigating the roles of other plant hormones in the growth process and on the gravitropic and phototropic properties of plants using modern time-lapse photography. Although it is clear that, at least with roots, auxin plays a major role in gravitropism it seems that other hormones acting with auxin are also involved. Cytokinin may be an inhibitor of root cap growth that controls early gravitropism in roots. Ethylene seems to be important in gravitropism in shoots, perhaps affecting sensitivity to auxin or its rate of transport.
