= Sporeling =

Developmental stage of plant or fungus

A sporeling is a young plant or fungus produced by a germinated spore, similar to a seedling derived from a germinated seed. They occur in algae, fungi, lichens, bryophytes and seedless vascular plants.

== Sporeling development ==
Most spores germinate by first producing a germ-rhizoid or holdfast followed by a germ tube emerging from the opposite end. The germ tube develops into the hypha, protonema or thallus of the gametophyte.

In seedless vascular plants such as ferns and lycopodiophyta, the term "sporeling" refers to the young sporophyte growing on the gametophyte. These sporelings develop via an embryo stage from a fertilized egg inside an archegonium and depend on the gametophyte for their early stages of growth before becoming independent sporophytes. Young fern sporelings can often be found with the prothallus gametophyte still attached at the base of their fronds.

== See also ==
- Conidium (mitospore)
- Sporogenesis
