= Coleoptile =

Protective sheath in certain plants

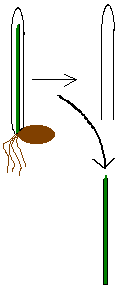
Schematic image of wheat coleoptile (above) and flag leaf (below)

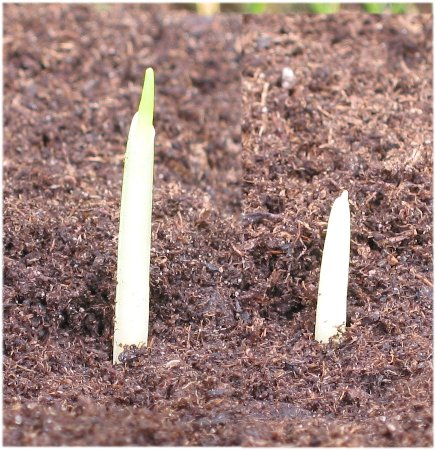
Young seedling breaks through the tip of the coleoptile (left). The majority of the tissue remains ungreening throughout the lifecycle (right).

The coleoptile is a pointed protective sheath covering the emerging shoot in monocotyledons such as grasses in which few leaf primordia and shoot apex of monocot embryo remain enclosed. The coleoptile protects the first leaf as well as the growing stem in seedlings and eventually, allows the first leaf to emerge. Coleoptiles have two vascular bundles, one on either side. Unlike the flag leaves rolled up within, the pre-emergent coleoptile does not accumulate significant protochlorophyll or carotenoids, and so it is generally very pale. Some preemergent coleoptiles do, however, accumulate purple anthocyanin pigments.

Coleoptiles consist of very similar cells that are all specialised to fast stretch growth. They do not divide, but increase in size as they accumulate more water. Coleoptiles also have water vessels (frequently two) along the axis to provide a water supply.

When a coleoptile reaches the surface, it stops growing and the flag leaves penetrate its top, continuing to grow along. The wheat coleoptile is most developed in the third day of the germination (if in the darkness).

== Tropisms ==
Early experiments on phototropism using coleoptiles suggested that plants grow towards light because plant cells on the darker side elongate more than those on the lighter side. In 1880 Charles Darwin and his son Francis found that coleoptiles only bend towards the light when their tips are exposed. Therefore, the tips must contain the photoreceptor cells although the bending takes place lower down on the shoot. A chemical messenger or hormone called auxin moves down the dark side of the shoot and stimulates growth on that side. The natural plant hormone responsible for phototropism is now known to be indoleacetic acid (IAA).

The Cholodny–Went model is named after Frits Warmolt Went of the California Institute of Technology and the Ukrainian scientist Nikolai Cholodny, who reached the same conclusion independently in 1927. It describes the phototropic and gravitropic properties of emerging shoots of monocotyledons. The model proposes that auxin, a plant growth hormone, is synthesized in the coleoptile tip, which senses light or gravity and will send the auxin down the appropriate side of the shoot. This causes asymmetric growth of one side of the plant. As a result, the plant shoot will begin to bend toward a light source or toward the surface.

Coleoptiles also exhibit strong geotropic reaction, always growing upward and correcting direction after reorientation. Geotropic reaction is regulated by light (more exactly by phytochrome action).

== Physiology ==
The coleoptile acts as a hollow organ with stiff walls, surrounding the young plantlet and the primary source of the gravitropic response. It is ephemeral, resulting in rapid senescence after the shoot emerges. This process resembles the creation of aerenchyma in roots and other parts of the plant. The coleoptile will emerge first appearing yellowish-white from an imbibed seed before developing chlorophyll on the next day. By the seventh day, it will have withered following programmed cell death. The coleoptile grows and produces chlorophyll only for the first day, followed by degradation and water potential caused growth. The two vascular bundles are organized parallel longitudinally to one another with a crack forming perpendicularly. Greening mesophyll cells with chlorophyll are present 2 to 3 cell layers from epidermis on the outer region of the crack, while non-greening cells are present everywhere else. The inner region contains cells with large amyloplasts supporting germination as well as the most interior cells dying to form aerenchyma.

The length of the coleoptile can be divided into an irreversible fraction, length at turgor pressure 0, and reversible fraction, or elastic shrinking. Changes induced by white light increase water potential in epidermal cells and decrease osmotic pressure, which resulted in an increase in the length of the coleoptile. The presence of the expanding coleoptile has also been shown to support developing tissues in the seedling as a hydrostatic tube prior to its emergence through the coleoptile tip.

Adventitious roots initially derive from the coleoptile node, which quickly overtake the seminal root by volume. In addition to being more numerous, these roots will be thicker (0.3–0.7 mm) than the seminal root (0.2–0.4 mm). These roots will grow faster than the shoots at low temperatures and slower at high temperatures.

== Anaerobic germination ==
In a small number of plants, such as rice, anaerobic germination can occur in waterlogged conditions. The seed uses the coleoptile as a 'snorkel', providing the seed with access to oxygen.
