= Nikolai Cholodny =

Microbiologist from Soviet Union

- Born: 22 June 1882; Tambov, Russian Empire
- Died: 4 May 1953 (aged 70); Kiev, Ukrainian SSR, Soviet Union
- Occupation: Microbiologist
- Known for: Cholodny–Went model

Nikolai Grigorievich Cholodny or Kholodny (Russian: Николай Григорьевич Холодный; Ukrainian: Микола Григорович Холодний, romanized: Mykola Hryhorovych Kholodny; 22 June 1882 – 4 May 1953) was a Soviet microbiologist who worked at the University of Kiev during the 1930s.

He is known for the Cholodny–Went model, which he developed independently with Frits Warmolt Went of the California Institute of Technology. Despite being associated with the same theory, the two men never actually met.

== Career ==
Cholodny worked in the A.V. Fomin Botanical Garden, attached to the University of Kiev.

He was one of the pioneers of the concept that microbes adhere to surfaces, using the technique of first placing glass slides in earth for a measured time period, then using a microscope to examine the slides. The Prokaryote Leptothrix cholodnii is named after him.

In 1927, Cholodny proposed that the cells of the coleoptile are first polarized under the influence of uneven exposure to light, so growth hormone can diffuse more rapidly towards the side in the shade than in any other direction. Went reached the same conclusion in 1928, and the two scientists' names have been attached to the controversial Cholodny–Went theory.

== Bibliography ==
Selected works include:

- 1926 Die eisenbakterien : bieträge zu einer monographie by N Cholodny
- 1928 Über eine vermeintliche Anomalie im Wachstumsmodus der Wurzeln von Lupinus albus by N Cholodny
- 1932 Lichtwachstumsreaktion und Phototropismus 2 by N Cholodny
- 1933 Zum Problem der Bildung und physiologischen Wirkung des Wuchshormons bei den Wurzeln by N Cholodny
- 1939 Spezielle Methoden.

In 1937 N. G. Cholodny and E. Ch. Sankewitsch published an article on Influence of weak electric currents upon the growth of the coleoptile in Plant Physiology. The same year he published an article on Charles Darwin and the modern theory of tropisms in Science magazine.
