= Hypergravity =

Environment where Earth's surface gravity is exceeded

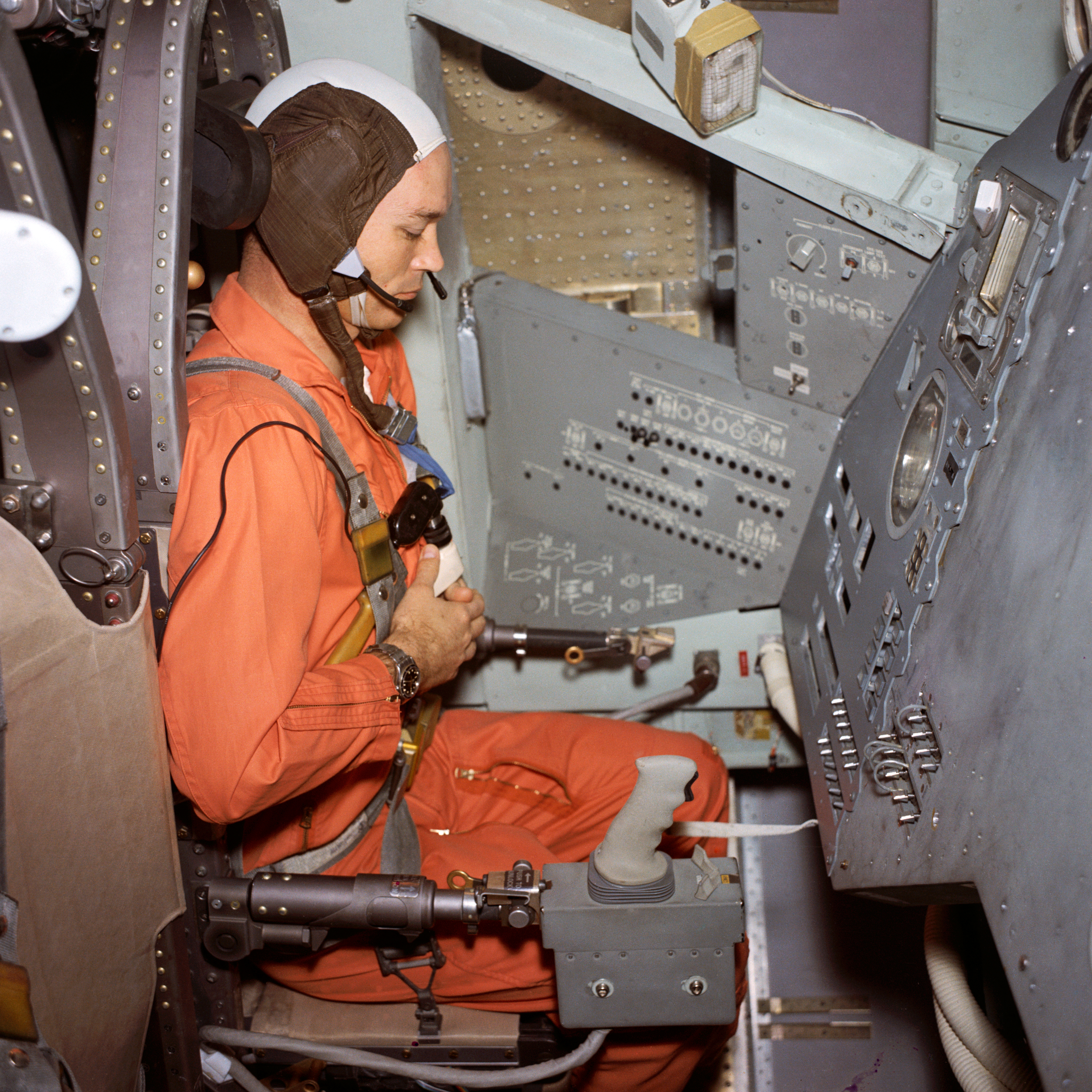
Michael Collins during centrifuge training

Hypergravity is defined as the condition where the force of gravity (real or perceived) exceeds that on the surface of the Earth. This is expressed as being greater than 1 g. Hypergravity conditions are created on Earth for research on human physiology in aerial combat and space flight, as well as testing of materials and equipment for space missions. Manufacturing of titanium aluminide turbine blades in 20 g is being explored by researchers at the European Space Agency (ESA) via an 8-meter wide Large Diameter Centrifuge (LDC).

== Bacteria ==
NASA scientists looking at meteorite impacts discovered that most strains of bacteria were able to reproduce under acceleration exceeding 7,500 g.

Recent research carried out on extremophiles in Japan involved a variety of bacteria including Escherichia coli and Paracoccus denitrificans being subject to conditions of extreme gravity. The bacteria were cultivated while being rotated in an ultracentrifuge at high speeds corresponding to 403,627 g. Another study that has been published in the Proceedings of the National Academy of Sciences, reports that some bacteria can exist even in extreme "hypergravity". In other words, they can still live and breed despite gravitational forces that are 400,000 times greater than what's felt here on Earth. Paracoccus denitrificans was one of the bacteria which displayed not only survival but also robust cellular growth under these conditions of hyperacceleration which are usually found only in cosmic environments, such as on very massive stars or in the shock waves of supernovas. Analysis showed that the small size of prokaryotic cells is essential for successful growth under hypergravity. The research has implications on the feasibility of existence of exobacteria and panspermia.

== Materials ==
High gravity conditions generated by centrifuge is applied in the chemical industry, casting, and material synthesis. The convection and mass transfer are greatly affected by the gravitational condition. Researchers reported that the high-gravity level can effectively affect the phase composition and morphology of the products.

== Research on Humans ==
See G-force: Human tolerance

== Effects on rate of aging of rats ==
Ever since Pearl proposed the rate of living theory of aging, numerous studies have demonstrated its validity in poikilotherms. In mammals, however, satisfactory experimental demonstration is still lacking because an externally imposed increase of basal metabolic rate of these animals (e.g. by placement in the cold) is usually accompanied by general homeostatic disturbance and stress. The present study was based on the finding that rats exposed to slightly increased gravity are able to adapt with little chronic stress but at a higher level of basal metabolic expenditure (increased 'rate of living'). The rate of aging of 17-month-old rats that had been exposed to 3.14 g in an animal centrifuge for 8 months was larger than of controls as shown by apparently elevated lipofuscin content in heart and kidney, reduced numbers and increased size of mitochondria of heart tissue, and inferior liver mitochondria respiration (reduced 'efficiency': 20% larger ADP: 0 ratio, P less than 0.01; reduced 'speed': 8% lower respiratory control ratio, P less than 0.05). Steady-state food intake per day per kg body weight, which is presumably proportional to 'rate of living' or specific basal metabolic expenditure, was about 18% higher than in controls (P less than 0.01) after an initial 2-month adaptation period. Finally, though half of the centrifuged animals lived only a little shorter than controls (average about 343 vs. 364 days on the centrifuge, difference statistically nonsignificant), the remaining half (longest survivors) lived on the centrifuge an average of 520 days (range 483–572) compared to an average of 574 days (range 502–615) for controls, computed from onset of centrifugation, or 11% shorter (P less than 0.01). Therefore, these results show that a moderate increase of the level of basal metabolism of young adult rats adapted to hypergravity compared to controls in normal gravity is accompanied by a roughly similar increase in the rate of organ aging and reduction of survival, in agreement with Pearl's rate of living theory of aging, previously experimentally demonstrated only in poikilotherms.

== Effects on the behavior of adult rats ==
Pups from gestating rats exposed to hypergravity (1.8 g) or to normal gravity at the perinatal period were evaluated. By comparison to controls, the hypergravity group had shorter latencies before choosing a maze arm in a T-maze and fewer exploratory pokes in a hole board. During dyadic encounters, the hypergravity group had a lower number of self-grooming episodes and shorter latencies before crossing under the opposing rat.

== See also ==
- g-force#Human tolerance
