= Phototropism =

Growth of a plant in response to a light stimulus

The light from the lamp (1.) functions as a detectable change in the plant's environment. As a result, the plant exhibits a reaction of phototropism—directional growth (2.) toward the light stimulus.

Auxin distribution controls phototropism. 1. Sunlight strikes the plant from directly above. Auxin (pink dots) encourages growth straight up. 2, 3, 4. Sunlight strikes the plant at an angle. Auxin is concentrated on one side, stimulating growth at an angle from the preceding stem.

Phototropism in Solanum lycopersicum.

In biology, phototropism, formerly called heliotropism, is the growth of an organism in response to a light stimulus. Phototropism is most often observed in plants, but can also occur in other organisms such as fungi. The cells on the plant that are farthest from the light contain a hormone called auxin that reacts when phototropism occurs. This causes the plant to have elongated cells on the furthest side from the light. Phototropism is one of the many plant tropisms, or movements, which respond to external stimuli. Growth towards a light source is called positive phototropism, while growth away from light is called negative phototropism. Negative phototropism is not to be confused with skototropism, which is defined as the growth towards darkness, whereas negative phototropism can refer to either the growth away from a light source or towards the darkness. Most plant shoots exhibit positive phototropism, and rearrange their chloroplasts in the leaves to maximize photosynthetic energy and promote growth. Some vine shoot tips exhibit negative phototropism, which allows them to grow towards dark, solid objects and climb them. The combination of phototropism and gravitropism allow plants to grow in the correct direction.

== Mechanism ==
There are several signaling molecules that help the plant determine where the light source is coming from, and these activate several genes, which change the hormone gradients allowing the plant to grow towards the light. The very tip of the plant is known as the coleoptile, which is necessary in light sensing. The middle portion of the coleoptile is the area where the shoot curvature occurs. The Cholodny–Went hypothesis, developed in the early 20th century, predicts that in the presence of asymmetric light, auxin will move towards the shaded side and promote elongation of the cells on that side to cause the plant to curve towards the light source. Auxins activate proton pumps, decreasing the pH in the cells on the dark side of the plant. This acidification of the cell wall region activates enzymes known as expansins which disrupt hydrogen bonds in the cell wall structure, making the cell walls less rigid. In addition, increased proton pump activity leads to more solutes entering the plant cells on the dark side of the plant, which increases the osmotic gradient between the symplast and apoplast of these plant cells. Water then enters the cells along its osmotic gradient, leading to an increase in turgor pressure. The decrease in cell wall strength and increased turgor pressure above a yield threshold causes cells to swell, exerting the mechanical pressure that drives phototropic movement.

Proteins encoded by a second group of genes, PIN genes, have been found to play a major role in phototropism. They are auxin transporters, and it is thought that they are responsible for the polarization of auxin location. Specifically PIN3 has been identified as the primary auxin carrier. It is possible that phototropins receive light and inhibit the activity of PINOID kinase (PID), which then promotes the activity of PIN3. This activation of PIN3 leads to asymmetric distribution of auxin, which then leads to asymmetric elongation of cells in the stem. pin3 mutants had shorter hypocotyls and roots than the wild-type, and the same phenotype was seen in plants grown with auxin efflux inhibitors. Using anti-PIN3 immunogold labeling, movement of the PIN3 protein was observed. PIN3 is normally localized to the surface of hypocotyl and stem, but is also internalized in the presence of Brefeldin A (BFA), an exocytosis inhibitor. This mechanism allows PIN3 to be repositioned in response to an environmental stimulus. PIN3 and PIN7 proteins were thought to play a role in pulse-induced phototropism. The curvature responses in the "pin3" mutant were reduced significantly, but only slightly reduced in "pin7" mutants. There is some redundancy among "PIN1", "PIN3", and "PIN7", but it is thought that PIN3 plays a greater role in pulse-induced phototropism.

There are phototropins that are highly expressed in the upper region of coleoptiles. There are two main phototropism they are phot1 and phot2. phot2 single mutants have phototropic responses like that of the wild-type, but phot1 phot2 double mutants do not show any phototropic responses. The amounts of PHOT1 and PHOT2 present are different depending on the age of the plant and the intensity of the light. There is a high amount of PHOT2 present in mature Arabidopsis leaves and this was also seen in rice orthologs. The expression of PHOT1 and PHOT2 changes depending on the presence of blue or red light. There was a downregulation of PHOT1 mRNA in the presence of light, but upregulation of PHOT2 transcript. The levels of mRNA and protein present in the plant were dependent upon the age of the plant. This suggests that the phototropin expression levels change with the maturation of the leaves. Mature leaves contain chloroplasts that are essential in photosynthesis. Chloroplast rearrangement occurs in different light environments to maximize photosynthesis. There are several genes involved in plant phototropism including the NPH1 and NPL1 gene. They are both involved in chloroplast rearrangement. The nph1 and npl1 double mutants were found to have reduced phototropic responses. In fact, the two genes are both redundant in determining the curvature of the stem.

Recent studies reveal that multiple AGC kinases, except for PHOT1 and PHOT2, are involved in plant phototropism. Firstly, PINOID, exhibiting a light-inducible expression pattern, determines the subcellular relocation of PIN3 during phototropic responses via a direct phosphorylation. Secondly, D6PK and its D6PKL homologs modulates the auxin transport activity of PIN3, likely through phosphorylation as well. Third, upstream of D6PK/D6PKLs, PDK1.1 and PDK1.2 acts an essential activator for these AGC kinases. Interestingly, different AGC kinases might participate in different steps during the progression of a phototropic response. D6PK/D6PKLs exhibit an ability to phosphorylate more phosphosites than PINOID.

=== Five models of auxin distribution in phototropism ===
In 2012, Sakai and Haga outlined how different auxin concentrations could be arising on shaded and lighted side of the stem, giving birth to phototropic response. Five models in respect to stem phototropism have been proposed, using Arabidopsis thaliana as the study plant.

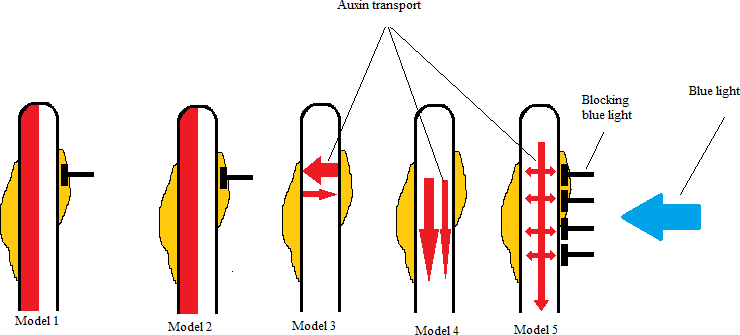
Five models showing how auxin is transported in the plant Arabidopsis.

First model

In the first model incoming light deactivates auxin on the light side of the plant allowing the shaded part to continue growing and eventually bend the plant over towards the light.

Second model

In the second model light inhibits auxin biosynthesis on the light side of the plant, thus decreasing the concentration of auxin relative to the unaffected side.

Third model

In the third model there is a horizontal flow of auxin from both the light and dark side of the plant. Incoming light causes more auxin to flow from the exposed side to the shaded side, increasing the concentration of auxin on the shaded side and thus more growth occurring.

Fourth model

In the fourth model it shows the plant receiving light to inhibit auxin basipetal down to the exposed side, causing the auxin to only flow down the shaded side.

Fifth model

Model five encompasses elements of both model 3 and 4. The main auxin flow in this model comes from the top of the plant vertically down towards the base of the plant with some of the auxin travelling horizontally from the main auxin flow to both sides of the plant. Receiving light inhibits the horizontal auxin flow from the main vertical auxin flow to the irradiated exposed side. And according to the study by Sakai and Haga, the observed asymmetric auxin distribution and subsequent phototropic response in hypocotyls seems most consistent with this fifth scenario.

== Effects of wavelength ==
Phototropism in plants such as Arabidopsis thaliana is directed by blue light receptors called phototropins. Other photosensitive receptors in plants include phytochromes that sense red light and cryptochromes that sense blue light. Different organs of the plant may exhibit different phototropic reactions to different wavelengths of light. Stem tips exhibit positive phototropic reactions to blue light, while root tips exhibit negative phototropic reactions to blue light. Both root tips and most stem tips exhibit positive phototropism to red light. Cryptochromes are photoreceptors that absorb blue/ UV-A light, and they help control the circadian rhythm in plants and timing of flowering. Phytochromes are photoreceptors that sense red/far-red light, but they also absorb blue light; they can control flowering in adult plants and the germination of seeds, among other things. The combination of responses from phytochromes and cryptochromes allow the plant to respond to various kinds of light. Together phytochromes and cryptochromes inhibit gravitropism in hypocotyls and contribute to phototropism.

== Gallery ==
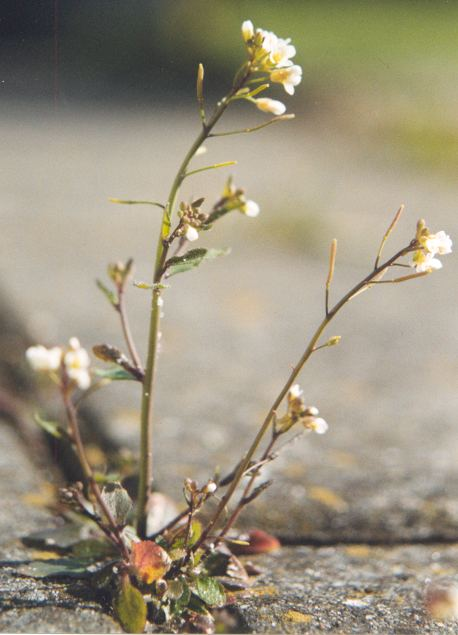
The Thale Cress (Arabidopsis thaliana) is regulated by blue to UV light

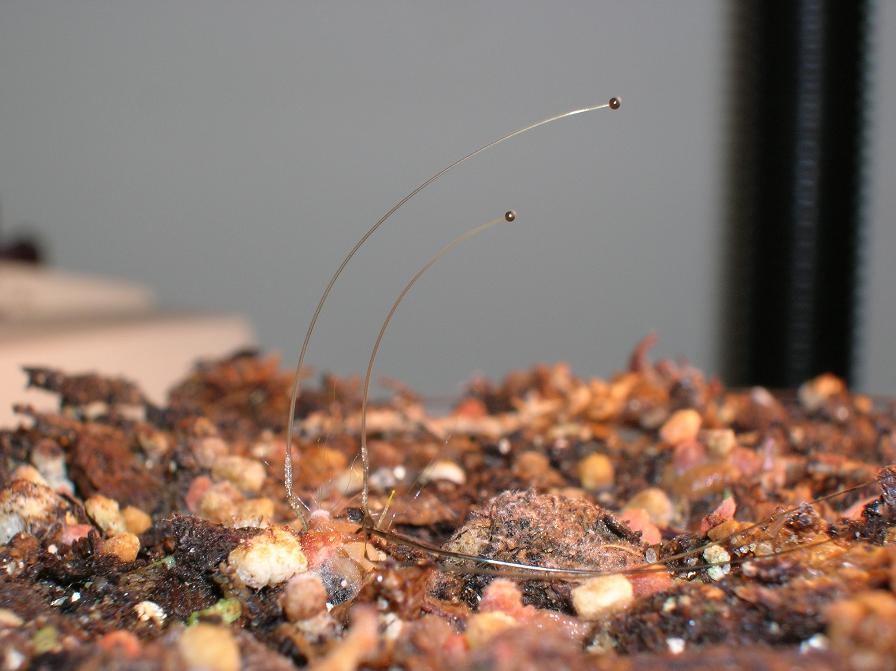
Phycomyces, a fungus, also exhibit phototropism

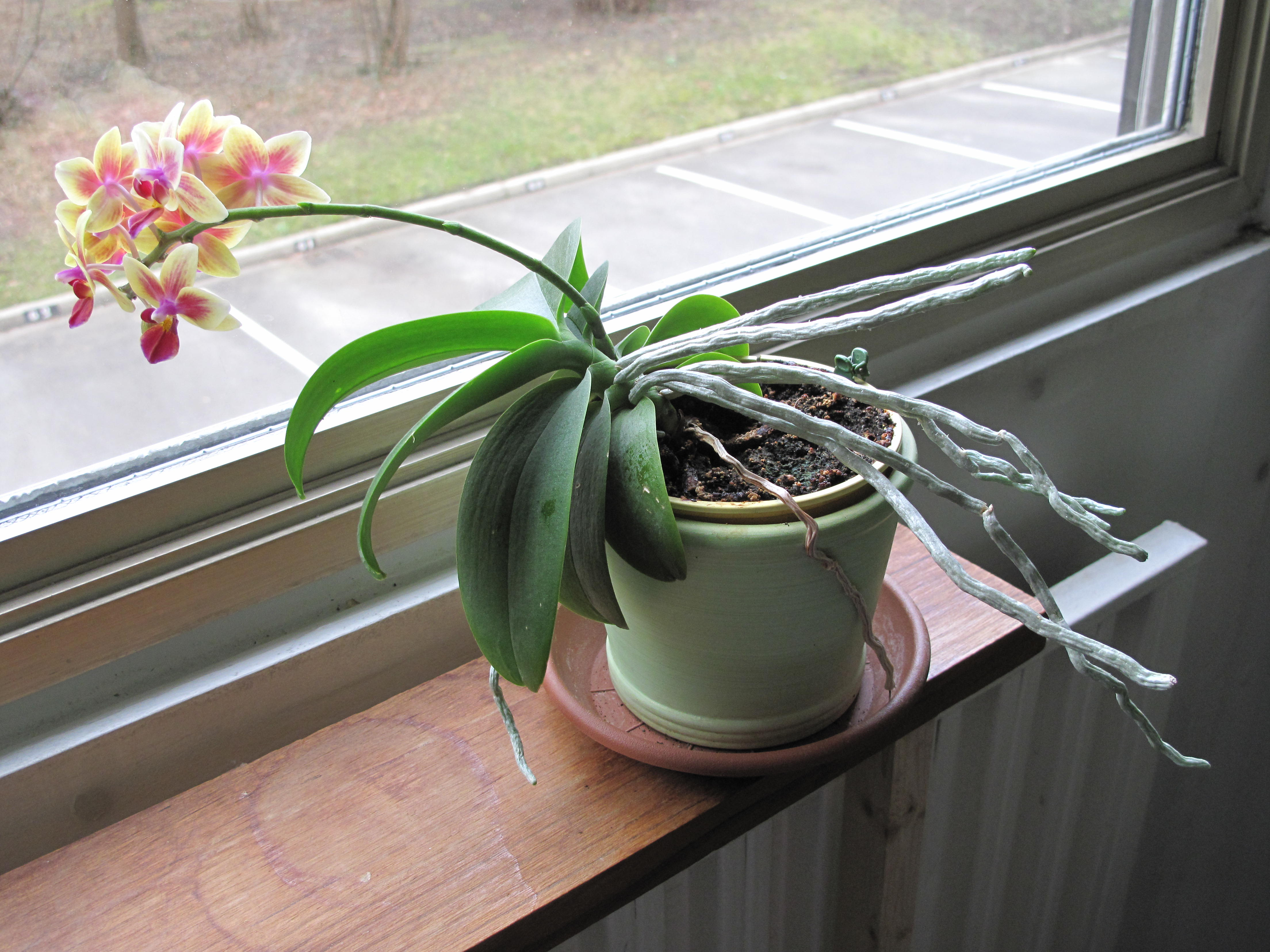
Example on a Phalaenopsis

Example on Azuki beans

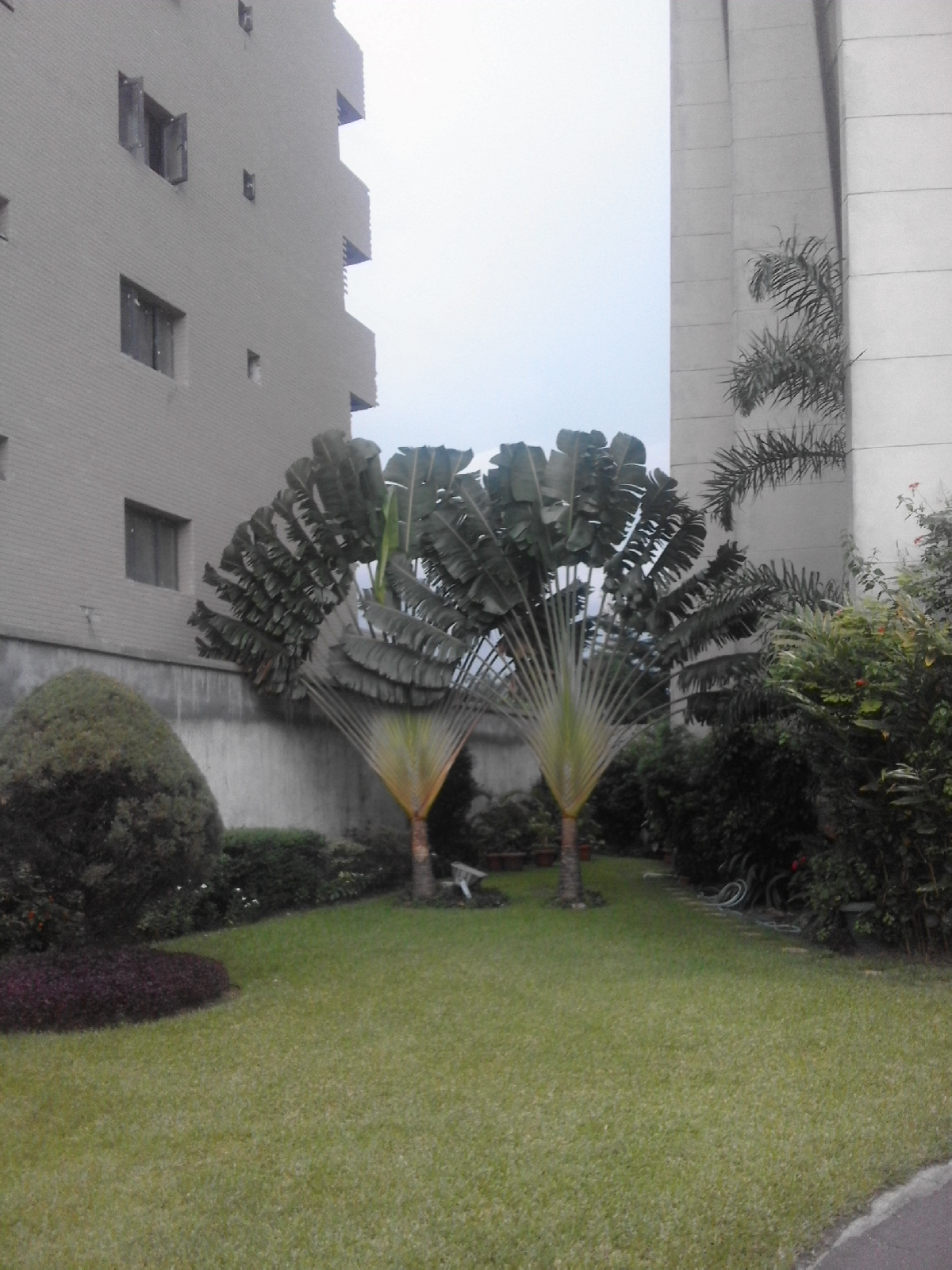
Ravenalas growing between two buildings in Kinshasa, Democratic Republic of Congo. The plane (here perpendicular to the north–south axis) of these two plants is orientated to maximize daylight absorption

== See also ==
- Etiolation
- Scotobiology
- Cholodny–Went model

== Bibliography ==
- Strong, Donald R.; Ray, Thomas S. (1 January 1975). "Host Tree Location Behavior of a Tropical Vine (Monstera gigantea) by Skototropism". Science. 190 (4216): 804–806. Bibcode:1975Sci...190..804S. doi:10.1126/science.190.4216.804. JSTOR 1741614. S2CID 84386403.
