= List of bills sponsored by Barack Obama in the United States Senate =

Barack Obama sponsored 148 bills from January 4, 2005, until November 16, 2008. Two became law. This figure does not include bills to which Obama contributed as cosponsor, such as the Coburn-Obama Federal Funding Accountability and Transparency Act of 2006 or the Lugar-Nunn Cooperative Proliferation Detection, Interdiction Assistance, and Conventional Threat Reduction Act of 2006. Nor does it include amendments to other bills, although in the Senate these are not required to be germane to the parent bill and can therefore effectively be bills in their own right. During the same time period, Obama has co-sponsored 689 bills in total; 408 of which had secured his support by the day they were originally introduced in the Senate.

Years covered	All bills sponsored	All amendments sponsored	All bills cosponsored	All amendments cosponsored	Original bills cosponsored	Original amendments cosponsored
2007-08	71	59	434	116	247	81
2005-06	66	86	255	172	161	125

== Review ==
The focus of legislation reflects his minority party appointments in Senate Resolution 6 of the 109th Congress to the Committee on Environment and Public Works, the Committee on Foreign Relations, and the Committee on Veterans' Affairs, and subsequent majority party appointments in the 110th Congress to the latter two committees and the Committee on Health, Education, Labor, and Pensions and the Committee on Homeland Security and Governmental Affairs.

== Table ==
Note: The information presented here is derived from thomas.loc.gov, but in some cases may be out of date. Also, these bills were not exclusively created nor singularly supported by Barack Obama.

The status of Obama's bills and resolutions as noted in the below table is in accordance with thomas.loc.gov. Introduced in the Senate (IS) refers to bills pending approval in committee. Reported to the Senate (RS) refers to bills that have received favorable report in committee and may be placed on the calendar for vote. Approved by the Senate (ATS) describes bills which have gained approval. Govtrack links from this column provide updated status, summaries, and full text of the bills.

Type	Number	Title or description	Status	Notes
109 S.	697	Higher Education Opportunity Through Pell Grant Expansion Act	IS	
109 S.	918	E-85 Fuel Utilization and Infrastructure Development Incentives Act of 2005	IS	
109 S.	969	Attacking Viral Influenza Across Nations Act of 2005	IS	
109 S.	1180	SAVE Reauthorization Act of 2005	IS	
109 S.	1194	Spent Nuclear Fuel Tracking and Accountability Act	IS	
109 S.	1426	Drinking Water Security Act of 2005	IS	
109 S.	1630	National Emergency Family Locator Act	IS	
109 S.	1638	Hurricane Katrina Emergency Health Workforce Act of 2005	IS	
109 S.	1685	To ensure the evacuation of individuals with special needs in times of emergency.	IS	
109 S.	1770	Hurricane Katrina Fast-Track Refunds for Working Families Act of 2005	IS	
109 S.	1920	Renewable Diesel Standard Act of 2005	IS	
109 S.	1975	Deceptive Practices and Voter Intimidation Prevention Act of 2005	IS	
109 S.	2045	Health Care for Hybrids Act	IS	
109 S.	2047	Healthy Communities Act of 2005	IS	
109 S.	2048	Lead Free Toys Act of 2005	IS	
109 S.	2125	Democratic Republic of the Congo Relief, Security, and Democracy Promotion Act of 2005	ATS	
109 S.	2149	STEP UP Act of 2005	IS	
109 S.	2154	To provide for the issuance of a commemorative postage stamp in honor of Rosa Parks.	IS	
109 S.	2179	CLEAN UP Act	IS	
109 S.	2201	Federal Aviation Administration Fair Labor Management Dispute Resolution Act of 2006	IS	
109 S.	2247	Federal Employees Health Benefits Program Efficiency Act of 2006	IS	
109 S.	2257	Hurricane Katrina Working Family Tax Relief Act of 2006	IS	
109 S.	2259	Congressional Ethics Enforcement Commission Act of 2006	IS	
109 S.	2261	Transparency and Integrity in Earmarks Act of 2006	IS	
109 S.	2280	STOP FRAUD Act	IS	
109 S.	2286	Equality for Two-Parent Families Act of 2006	IS	
109 S.	2319	Hurricane Katrina Recovery Act of 2006	IS	
109 S.	2348	Nuclear Release Notice Act of 2006	RS	
109 S.	2358	VA Hospital Quality Report Card Act of 2006	IS	
109 S.	2359	Hospital Quality Report Card Act of 2006	IS	
109 S.	2441	Innovation Districts for School Improvement Act	IS	
109 S.	2446	American Fuels Act of 2006	IS	
109 S.	2484	Protecting Taxpayer Privacy Act	IS	
109 S.	2506	Healthy Places Act of 2006	IS	
109 S.	2984	FILL UP Act	IS	
109 S.	3155	To suspend temporarily the duty on RSD 1235.	IS	
109 S.	3156	To suspend temporarily the duty on N6-Benzyladenine.	IS	
109 S.	3157	To suspend temporarily the duty on MCPB acid and MCPB sodium salt.	IS	
109 S.	3158	To suspend temporarily the duty on 2-Methyl-4-chlorophenoxyacetic acid, salts, and esters.	IS	
109 S.	3159	To suspend temporarily the duty on gibberellic acid.	IS	
109 S.	3160	To suspend temporarily the duty on triphenyltin hydroxide.	IS	
109 S.	3161	To suspend temporarily the duty on certain sebacic acid.	IS	
109 S.	3162	To suspend temporarily the duty on bromoxynil octonoate.	IS	
109 S.	3163	To extend temporarily the suspension of duty on certain epoxy molding compounds.	IS	
109 S.	3243	To suspend temporarily the duty on metsulfuron-methyl.	IS	
109 S.	3244	To suspend temporarily the duty on dichlorprop-p acid, dichlorprop-p dimethylamine salt, and dichlorprop-p 2-ethylhexyl ester.	IS	
109 S.	3245	To suspend temporarily the duty on 2,4-DB Acid and 2,4-DB Dimethylamine Salt.	IS	
109 S.	3249	To suspend temporarily the duty on metsulfuron-methyl.	IS	
109 S.	3250	To suspend temporarily the duty on 2,4-DB Acid and 2,4-DB Dimethylamine Salt.	IS	
109 S.	3251	To suspend temporarily the duty on dichlorprop-p acid, dichlorprop-p dimethylamine salt, and dichlorprop-p 2-ethylhexyl ester.	IS	
109 S.	3475	Homes for Heroes Act of 2006	IS	
109 S.	3554	Alternative Diesel Standard Act of 2006	IS	
109 S.	3627	Mercury Market Minimization Act of 2006	IS	
109 S.	3631	Missing Mercury in Manufacturing Monitoring and Mitigation Act	IS	
109 S.	3694	Fuel Economy Reform Act	IS	
109 S.	3757	To designate the facility of the United States Postal Service located at 950 Missouri Avenue in East St. Louis, Illinois, as the `Katherine Dunham Post Office Building'.	IS	
109 S.	3822	Genomics and Personalized Medicine Act of 2006	IS	
109 S.	3969	Lead Poisoning Reduction Act of 2006	IS	
109 S.	3988	Lane Evans Veterans Health and Benefits Improvement Act of 2006	IS	
109 S.	4069	Deceptive Practices and Voter Intimidation Prevention Act of 2006	IS	
109 S.	4102	Election Jamming Prevention Act of 2006	IS	
109 S.CON.RES.	42	Recognizing the historical significance of Juneteenth Independence Day, and expressing the sense of Congress that history should be regarded as a means for understanding the past and...	IS	
109 S.CON.RES.	53	Expressing the sense of Congress that any effort to impose photo identification requirements for voting should be rejected.	IS	
109 S.RES.	291	To congratulate the Chicago White Sox on winning the 2005 World Series Championship.	ATS	
109 S.RES.	516	Recognizing the historical significance of Juneteenth Independence Day and expressing the sense of the Senate that history should be regarded as a means for understanding the past and...	ATS	
109 S.RES.	529	Designating July 13, 2006, as `National Summer Learning Day'.	ATS	
110 S.	114	Innovation Districts for School Improvement Act	IS	
110 S.	115	Oil SENSE Act	IS	
110 S.	116	STEP UP Act of 2007	IS	
110 S.	117	Lane Evans Veterans Health and Benefits Improvement Act of 2007	IS	
110 S.	133	American Fuels Act of 2007	IS	
110 S.	433	Iraq War De-Escalation Act of 2007	IS	
110 S.	453	Deceptive Practices and Voter Intimidation Prevention Act of 2007	RS	
110 S.	674	Transparency and Accountability in Military and Security Contracting Act of 2007	IS	
110 S.	692	VA Hospital Quality Report Card Act of 2007	IS	
110 S.	713	Dignity for Wounded Warriors Act of 2007	IS	
110 S.	737	Voter Advocate and Democracy Index Act of 2007	IS	
110 S.	767	Fuel Economy Reform Act	IS	
110 S.	768	Fuel Economy Reform Act	IS	
110 S.	795	Citizenship Promotion Act of 2007	IS	
110 S.	823	Microbicide Development Act	IS	
110 S.	906	Mercury Market Minimization Act of 2007	ENR	
110 S.	976	Genomics and Personalized Medicine Act of 2007	IS	
110 S.	1067	Healthy Places Act of 2007	IS	
110 S.	1068	Healthy Communities Act of 2007	IS	
110 S.	1084	Homes for Heroes Act of 2007	IS	
110 S.	1151	Health Care for Hybrids Act	IS	
110 S.	1181	Shareholder Vote on Executive Compensation Act	IS	
110 S.	1222	STOP FRAUD Act	IS	
110 S.	1271	Homecoming Enhancement Research and Oversight (HERO) Act	IS	
110 S.	1306	Lead Free Toys Act of 2007	IS	
110 S.	1324	National Low-Carbon Fuel Standard Act of 2007	IS	
110 S.	1389	Climate Change Education Act	IS	
110 S.	1430	Iran Sanctions Enhancement Act of 2007	IS	
110 S.	1513	Predominantly Black Institution Act of 2007	IS	
110 S.	1574	Teaching Residency Act	IS	
110 S.	1713	To provide for the issuance of a commemorative postage stamp in honor of Rosa Parks.	IS	
110 S.	1790	Communities of Color Teen Pregnancy Prevention Act of 2007	IS	
110 S.	1811	Lead Poisoning Reduction Act of 2007	IS	
110 S.	1817	To ensure proper administration of the discharge of members of the Armed Forces for personality disorder, and for other purposes.	IS	
110 S.	1818	Missing Mercury in Manufacturing Monitoring and Mitigation Act	IS	
110 S.	1824	Hospital Quality Report Card Act of 2007	IS	
110 S.	1873	Improving Emergency Medical Care and Response Act of 2007	IS	
110 S.	1885	Military Family Job Protection Act	IS	
110 S.	1977	Nuclear Weapons Threat Reduction Act of 2007	IS	
110 S.	1989	Pigford Claims Remedy Act of 2007	IS	
110 S.	2030	To amend the Federal Election Campaign Act of 1971 to require reporting relating to bundled contributions made by persons other than registered lobbyists.	IS	
110 S.	2044	Independent Contractor Proper Classification Act of 2007	IS	
110 S.	2066	Back to School: Improving Standards for Nutrition and Physical Education in Schools Act of 2007	IS	
110 S.	2111	Positive Behavior for Effective Schools Act	IS	
110 S.	2132	To prohibit the introduction or delivery for introduction into interstate commerce of children's products that contain lead, and for other purposes.	IS	
110 S.	2147	Security Contractor Accountability Act of 2007	IS	
110 S.	2202	Renewable Fuel Standard Extension Act of 2007	IS	
110 S.	2224	Nuclear Release Notice Act of 2007	IS	
110 S.	2227	Success in the Middle Act of 2007	IS	
110 S.	2330	Veterans Homelessness Prevention Act	IS	
110 S.	2347	Prevention Through Affordable Access Act	IS	
110 S.	2392	National STEM Scholarship Database Act	IS	
110 S.	2428	National STEM Scholarship Database Act	IS	
110 S.	2433	Global Poverty Act of 2007	RS	
110 S.	2519	Contracting and Tax Accountability Act of 2007	IS	
110 S.	3047	Enhancing Science, Technology, Engineering, and Mathematics Education Act of 2008	IS	
110 S.	3077	Strengthening Transparency and Accountability in Federal Spending Act of 2008	IS	
110 S.	3142	A bill to amend the Public Health Service Act to enhance public health activities related to stillbirth and sudden unexpected infant death.	IS	
110 S.	3358	A bill to provide for enhanced food-borne illness surveillance and food safety capacity.	IS	
110 S.	3506	A bill to amend the Internal Revenue Code of 1986 to increase the credit for purchase of vehicles fueled by natural gas or liquefied natural gas and to amend the Safe, Accountable, Flexible, Efficient Transportation Equity Act: A Legacy for Users to reauthorize the Clean School Bus Program of the Environmental Protection Agency.	IS	
110 S.CON.RES.	25	Condemning the recent violent actions of the Government of Zimbabwe against peaceful opposition party activists and members of civil society.	RS	
110 S.CON.RES.	44	Expressing the sense of Congress that a commemorative postage stamp should be issued honoring Rosa Louise McCauley Parks.	IS	
110 S.CON.RES.	46	Whereas Sickle Cell Disease is an inherited blood disorder that is a major health problem in the United States, primarily affecting African Americans;	IS	
110 S.CON.RES.	96	A concurrent resolution commemorating Irena Sendler, a woman whose bravery saved the lives of thousands during the Holocaust and remembering her legacy of courage, selflessness, and hope.	HDS	
110 S.CON.RES.	5	Honoring the life of Percy Lavon Julian, a pioneer in the field of organic chemistry and the only African-American chemist to be inducted into the National Academy of Sciences.	IS	
110 S.J.RES.	23	Whereas the Authorization for the Use of Military Force Against Iraq (Public Law 107-243) authorized the President `to use the Armed Forces of the United States as he determines to...	IS	
110 S.RES.	133	Whereas Bishop Gilbert Earl Patterson was born in 1939 to Bishop W.A. and Mrs. Mary Patterson Sr., in Humboldt, Tennessee;	ATS	
110 S.RES.	268	Designating July 12, 2007, as `National Summer Learning Day'.	ATS	
110 S.RES.	383	Honoring and recognizing the achievements of Carl Stokes, the first African-American mayor of a major American city, in the 40th year since his election as Mayor of Cleveland, Ohio.	IS	
110 S.RES.	600	A resolution commemorating the 44th anniversary of the deaths of civil rights workers Andrew Goodman, James Chaney, and Michael Schwerner in Philadelphia, Mississippi, while working in the name of American democracy to register voters and secure civil rights during the summer of 1964, which has become known as "Freedom Summer".	ATS	
110 S.RES.	628	A resolution expressing support for the designation of Disability Pride Day and recognizing that all people, including people living with disabilities, have the right, responsibility, and ability to be active, contributing members of society and fully engaged as citizens of the United States.	IS	

== See also ==
- Barack Obama
- Political positions of Barack Obama
- Barack Obama presidential campaign, 2008
