= Paula McSteen =

Plant geneticist

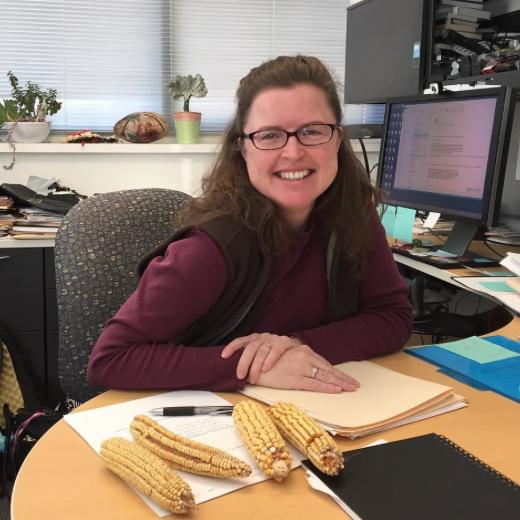
- Education: University of East Anglia
- Scientific career
- Workplaces: University of Missouri
- Thesis: Genetic interactions controlling perianth development in Antirrhinum majus (1996)

Paula McSteen is a scientist known for her research on plant genetics. In 2020 she was elected a fellow of the American Association for the Advancement of Science.

== Education and career ==
McSteen received her B.A. from the University of Dublin Trinity College and earned her Ph.D. in Plant Developmental Genetics in 1996 from the University of East Anglia. In 2010 she joined the faculty of the University of Missouri as an associate professor, having previously worked as an assistant professor at Pennsylvania State University. As of 2021 she is a professor at the University of Missouri.

== Research ==
McSteen is known for her research on plant genetics, particularly on the role of hormones that influence the actions of plant meristems. Her graduate research defined the genes required to control the development of reproductive organs in Antirrhinum, flowers commonly known as snapdragons. She then moved to using corn as a genetic model. She has examined the role of multiple genes by corn, including research into bif2 barren inflorescence2 which plays a role in regulation of hormones needed during the development of corn. Through examination of corn that produced malformed ears, McSteen determined that the gene vt2, short for vanishing tassel2, was absent, which means reduced levels of the hormone auxin and leads to malformed ears of corn. In 2019, McSteen found the barren stalk2 gene, ba2, which impacts the development of the cells that give rise to ears of corn. In the course of learning about this gene, she found that this mutation had first been found in the 1930s, but then knowledge about its role was lost.

=== Selected publications ===
- Mashiguchi, K.; Tanaka, K.; Sakai, T.; Sugawara, S.; Kawaide, H.; Natsume, M.; Hanada, A.; Yaeno, T.; Shirasu, K.; Yao, H.; McSteen, P.; Zhao, Y.; Hayashi, K.-i.; Kamiya, Y.; Kasahara, H. (8 November 2011). "The main auxin biosynthesis pathway in Arabidopsis". Proceedings of the National Academy of Sciences. 108 (45): 18512–18517. Bibcode:2011PNAS..10818512M. doi:10.1073/pnas.1108434108. PMC 3215075. PMID 22025724.
- McSteen, Paula; Leyser, Ottoline (June 2005). "SHOOT BRANCHING". Annual Review of Plant Biology. 56 (1): 353–374. doi:10.1146/annurev.arplant.56.032604.144122. PMID 15862100.
- McSteen, Paula (6 January 2009). "Hormonal Regulation of Branching in Grasses". Plant Physiology. 149 (1): 46–55. doi:10.1104/pp.108.129056. PMC 2613715. PMID 19126694.
- Gallavotti, Andrea; Barazesh, Solmaz; Malcomber, Simon; Hall, Darren; Jackson, David; Schmidt, Robert J.; McSteen, Paula (30 September 2008). "sparse inflorescence1 encodes a monocot-specific YUCCA-like gene required for vegetative and reproductive development in maize". Proceedings of the National Academy of Sciences. 105 (39): 15196–15201. Bibcode:2008PNAS..10515196G. doi:10.1073/pnas.0805596105. ISSN 0027-8424. PMC 2567514. PMID 18799737.

== Awards and honors ==
- McSteen is an elected fellow of the American Association for the Advancement of Science who cited her for "distinguished contributions to the field of plant genetics, particularly the role of the hormone, auxin, in maize reproductive development". In 2017 she received the L. Stadler Mid-Career Award from the Maize Genetics Corporation.
- In 2017 McSteen received the L. Stadler Mid-Career Maize Genetics Award.
