= Rackmax =

Rackmax was a plant growth stimulation product that was supposed to be sprayed on crops at seeding time to make them grow faster. It was marketed to hunters with the claim that it would improve the growth of clover which would attract and nourish deer and other hoofed animals.

The product was presumed to contain auxin or some similar growth hormone.

The product was manufactured and sold by the Rack-max company of Mobile, Alabama. The company was founded in 2003 by Harry Edward Haas (1950-12-21 – 2024-07-06) and apparently ceased operations some time before his death.

== See also ==
- Auxin
- SUPERthrive
- Fertilizer
