= C12H11NO =

The molecular formula C_{12}H_{11}NO (molar mass 185.22 g/mol, exact mass: 185.0841 u) may refer to:

- 1-Naphthaleneacetamide (NAAm)
- Pirfenidone
