= Streptomyces atrovirens =

Scientific classification
- Domain: Bacteria
- Kingdom: Bacillati
- Phylum: Actinomycetota
- Class: Actinomycetes
- Order: Streptomycetales
- Family: Streptomycetaceae
- Genus: Streptomyces
- Species: S. atrovirens

Binomial name
- Streptomyces atrovirens (ex Preobrazhenskaya et al. 1971) Preobrazhenskaya and Terekhova 1986

Type strain
- AS 4.1595, CGMCC 4.1595, DSM 41467, IFO 15388, INA 1551, JCM 6913, NBRC 15388, NRRL B-16357, VKM Ac-1213

Synonyms
- Actinomyces atrovirens

Species of bacterium

Streptomyces atrovirens is a bacterium species from the genus Streptomyces which was isolated from soil in Egypt. Streptomyces atrovirens produces indole-3-acetic acid.

== See also ==
- List of Streptomyces species
