= MCPA =

Organic compound used as an herbicide

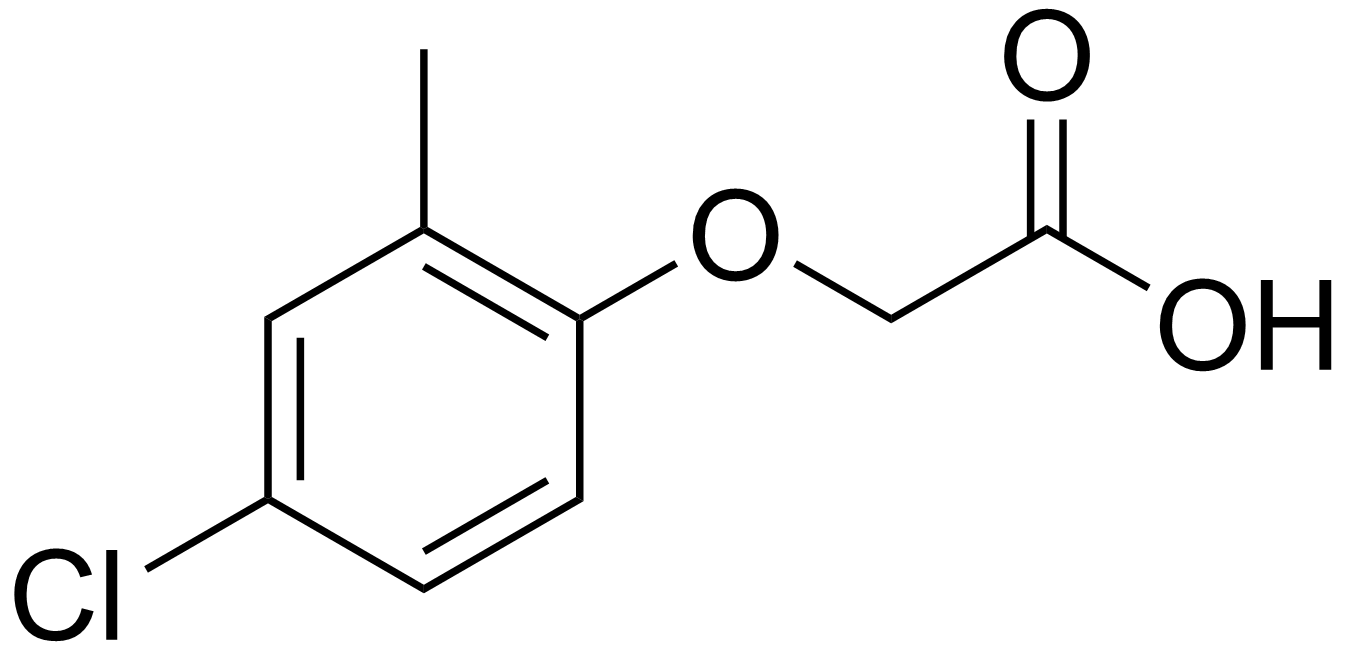

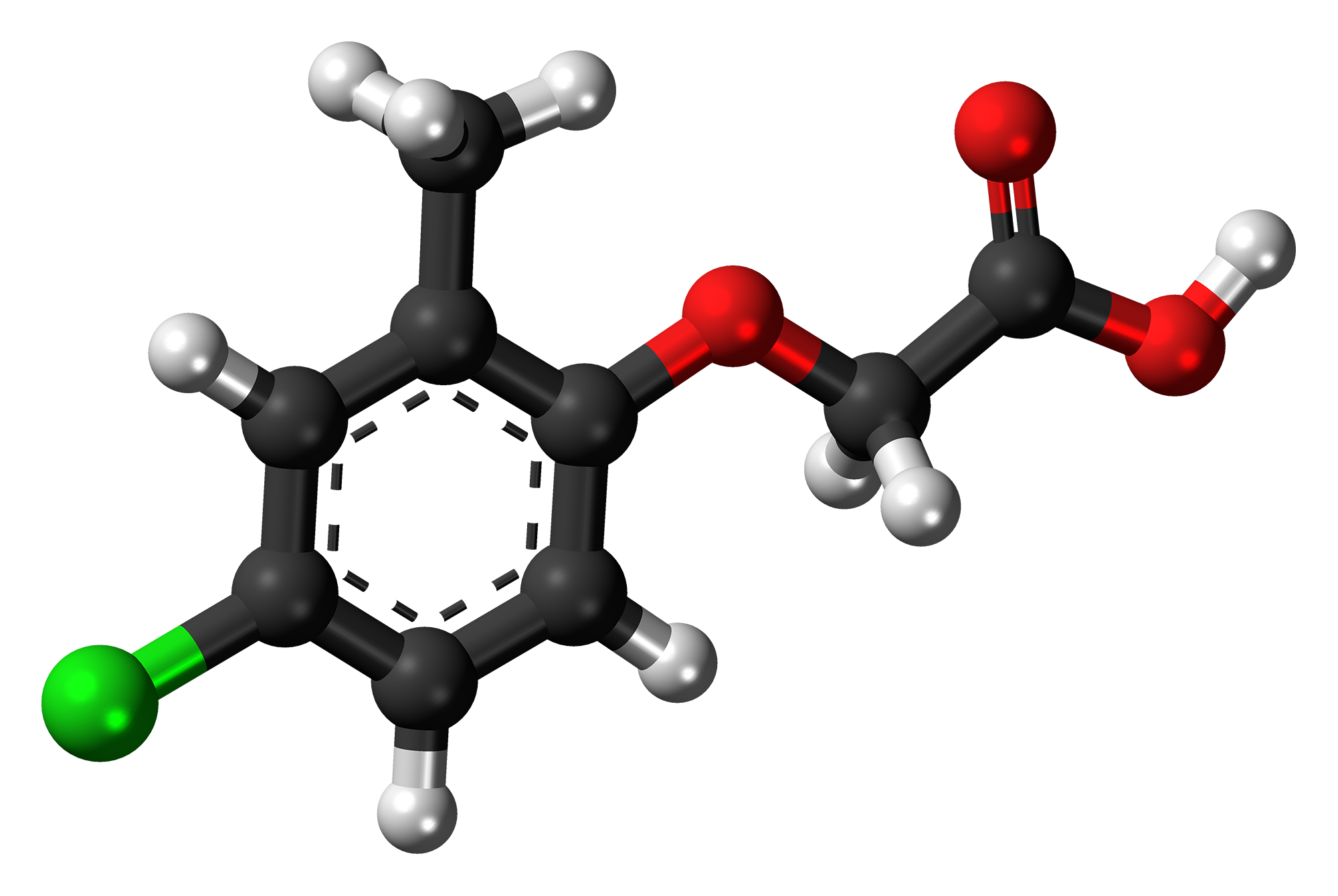

Names
- Preferred IUPAC name (4-Chloro-2-methylphenoxy)acetic acid
- Other names 2-(4-Chloro-2-methylphenoxy)acetic acid 4-Chloro-o-tolyloxyacetic acid MCPA

Identifiers
CAS Number	94-74-6
3D model (JSmol)	Interactive image
ChEBI	CHEBI:50099
ChEMBL	ChEMBL394657
ChemSpider	6935
ECHA InfoCard	100.002.146
KEGG	C18528
PubChem CID	7204
UNII	D888C394VO
CompTox Dashboard (EPA)	DTXSID4024195
- InChI: InChI=1S/C9H9ClO3/c1-6-4-7(10)2-3-8(6)13-5-9(11)12/h2-4H,5H2,1H3,(H,11,12) Key: WHKUVVPPKQRRBV-UHFFFAOYSA-N; InChI=1/C9H9ClO3/c1-6-4-7(10)2-3-8(6)13-5-9(11)12/h2-4H,5H2,1H3,(H,11,12) Key: WHKUVVPPKQRRBV-UHFFFAOYAG
- SMILES: Cl-C1=CC=C(OCC(=O)O)C(C)=C1

Properties
Chemical formula	C_{9}H_{9}ClO_{3}
Molar mass	200.62 g·mol^{−1}
Appearance	White to light brown solid
Density	1.18-1.21 g/cm^{3}
Melting point	114 to 118 °C (237 to 244 °F; 387 to 391 K)
Solubility in water	825 mg/L (23 °C), amine salt: 866 g/L ester: 5 mg/L

Hazards
Safety data sheet (SDS)	External MSDS
- Except where otherwise noted, data are given for materials in their standard state (at 25 °C [77 °F], 100 kPa). Infobox references

MCPA (2-methyl-4-chlorophenoxyacetic acid) is a widely used phenoxy herbicide introduced in 1945. It selectively controls broad-leaf weeds in pasture and cereal crops. The mode of action of MCPA is as an auxin, which are growth hormones that naturally exist in plants.

== History ==
In 1936 investigations began at ICIs Jealott's Hill research center into the effects of auxins on plant growth looking specifically for a way to kill weeds without harming crops such as wheat and oats. William Templeman found that when indole-3-acetic acid (IAA), the naturally occurring auxin, was used at high concentrations, it could stop plant growth. In 1940, he published his finding that IAA killed broadleaf plants within a cereal field. Templeman and the ICI group were searching for compounds with similar or greater selective activity than IAA or 1-naphthaleneacetic acid in inhibiting the growth of weeds while not adversely affecting the growth of cereal crops. They synthesized MCPA from the corresponding phenol by exposing it to chloroacetic acid and dilute base in a straightforward substitution reaction:

2-methyl-4-chlorophenol + ClCH_{2}CO_{2}H + base → MCPA + base·HCl (hydrochloric acid)

By the end of 1941 it was clear to the Templeman group that MCPA was one of the most active compounds tested but other auxin herbicides including 2,4-D were also effective. This work took place during World War II and was a case of multiple discovery. Four groups worked independently in the United Kingdom and the United States: the ICI team; Philip S. Nutman and associates at Rothamsted Research in the UK; Franklin D. Jones and associates at the American Chemical Paint Company; and Ezra Kraus, John W. Mitchell, and associates at the University of Chicago and the United States Department of Agriculture. All four groups were subject to wartime secrecy laws and did not follow the usual procedures of publication and patent disclosure, although ICI did file an application relating to both MCPA and 2,4-D on 7 April 1941 in the UK. In December 1942, following a meeting at the Ministry of Agriculture the Rothamsted and ICI workers pooled resources and Nutman moved to Jealott's Hill to join the ICI effort. The first publications about this group of herbicides were by other workers who were not the original inventors: the precise sequence of discovery events has been discussed. MCPA was first reported in the open scientific literature by Slade, Templeman and Sexton in 1945. ICI's decision to commercialize MCPA (rather than 2,4-D, for example) was influenced by the fact that ICI had access to 2-methyl-4-chlorophenol and following extensive field trials the material was first made available to UK farmers in 1946, as a 1% dust.

== Mode of action ==
MCPA acts by mimicking the action of the plant growth hormone auxin, which results in uncontrolled growth and eventually death in susceptible plants, mainly dicotyledons. It is absorbed through the leaves and is translocated to the meristems of the plant. Uncontrolled, unsustainable growth ensues, causing stem curl-over, leaf withering, and eventual plant death.

== Commercial use ==
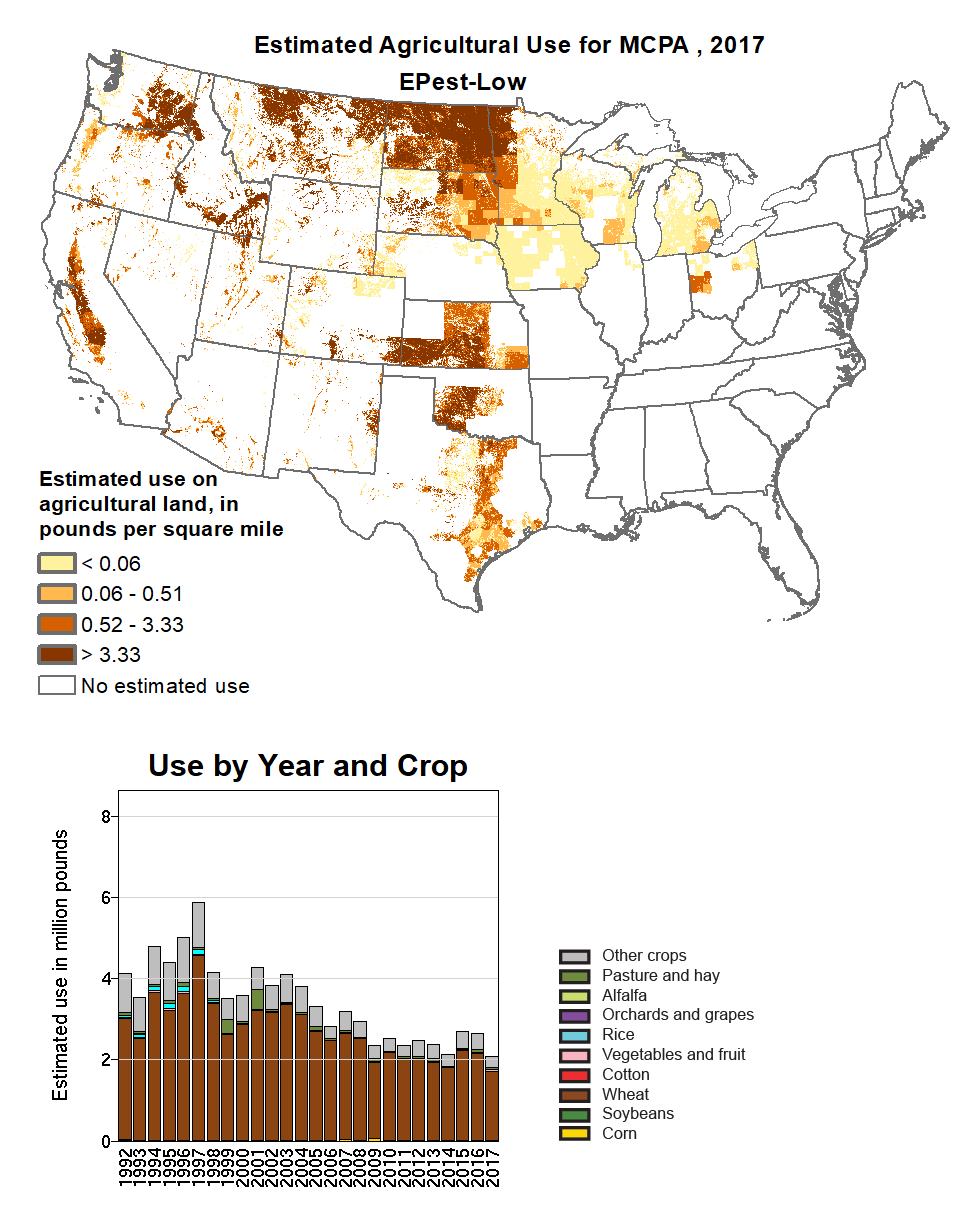
US Geological Survey estimate of MCPA use in the USA, 1992 to 2017

MCPA is used as an herbicide, generally as its salt or esterified forms. Used thus, it controls broadleaf weeds, including thistle and dock, in cereal crops and pasture. It is selective for plants with broad leaves, and this includes most deciduous trees. Clovers are tolerant at moderate application levels. It is currently classified as a restricted use herbicide in the United States: its use is mapped by the US Geological Survey, whose data show consistent use from 1992, with a small recent decline in the ten years to 2017, the latest date for which figures are available. The compound is now used almost exclusively in wheat.

Its toxicity and biodegradation are topics of current research. One formulation is described by its manufacturer as "designed for specific markets that require the safest possible phenoxy product, primarily for use in the Pacific Northwest". Though not extremely toxic, it has been determined that MCPA can form complexes with metal ions and thereby increase their bioavailability, and there is also work being done to utilize this ability.

== Chemical use ==
Because it is inexpensive, MCPA is used in various chemical applications. Its carboxylic acid group allows the formation of conjugated complexes with metals (see above). The acid functionality makes MCPA a versatile synthetic intermediate for more complex derivatives.

== Brand names ==
The following commercial products contain MCPA:

- Agritox, Agroxone, Chiptox, Chwastox, Cornox, Methoxone, Rhonox, Spurge Power, Tigrex, Verdone Extra (UK), Weed-Rhap, Weed'n'Feed, Weed-B-Gone, Zero Bindii & Clover Weeder (Aus), Jolt (Aus), BIN-DIE (Aus), Maatilan MCPA, K-MCPA, Hedonal, Basagran (Finland), and others.

== Degradation in soil ==
Since MCPA is extensively used in the USA, the extensively dispersed MCPA and its biological and photochemical metabolites might be deemable as environmentally hazardous. However, current studies show that there is no resistance of MCPA to degrade in soil.

=== Behaviors in soil ===
MCPA herbicide is usually sprayed to the soil surface and plant leaves in its water solution, sometimes with additional surfactant. MCPA in soil can be absorbed by plant roots, and translocated in phloem to leaves and stems. The MCPA residue left in soil typically has a half-life of 24 days. However, the degradation rate depends on environmental conditions, such as temperature and soil moisture. MCPA is rather mobile in soil, and not strongly adsorbed to soil particles, with Kf = 0.94 and 1/n = 0.68 of Freundlich adsorption.

=== Environmental risks ===
Wide usage of MCPA as an herbicide raises concern of environmental risks, so considerable research has been done in recent decades to evaluate the environmental risk of MCPA. MCPA can be moderately toxic to mammal and aquatic organisms, and relatively less toxic to birds. MCP (4-chloro-2-methylphenol) is the intermediate in the synthesis of phenoxy herbicides, and is also the metabolite of MCPA degradation. It has been estimated that a total of 15000 tons of MCP were produced in 1989 in the EU. MCP is considered very toxic to aquatic organisms. However, the concentration of MCPA and MCP detected in water and soil are lower than the predicted no-effect levels of all environmental compartments, and considered to present low potential risk.

The carboxyl group of MCPA can form conjugated complex with metals as a ligand. In the general pH range of aqueous environments, the MCPA-metal complex has higher solubility than metal ions. MCPA may be environmentally hazardous by affecting the mobility and bio-availability of heavy metals such as cadmium and lead. The acid functionality makes MCPA a versatile synthetic intermediate for more complex derivatives

-COOH + M^{+} → -COOM + H^{+}

=== Bio-degradation ===
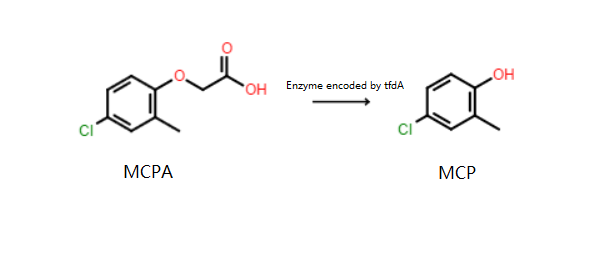
Bio-degradation of MCPA in soils

The MCPA can be degraded biologically in soils by plants and microorganisms. The major metabolite of MCPA degradation is MCP (4-chloro-2-methylphenol). The pathway could be the cleavage of the ether linkage, yielding MCP and acetate acid. Another pathway could be the hydroxylation of the methyl group, yielding cloxyfonac (4-Chloro-2-hydroxymethylphenoxyacetic acid). Recent studies have demonstrated that biological degradation of MCPA is enzymatically catalyzed by an α-ketoglutarate-dependent dioxygenase encoded by the tfdA gene of soil microorganisms. Soil indigenous bacteria that carry the tfdA gene could use MCPA as the sole source of carbon.

=== Photo-degradation ===
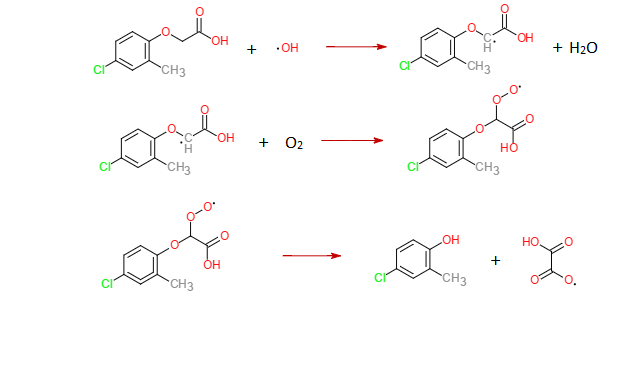
Oxidation of MCPA by hydroxyl radicals

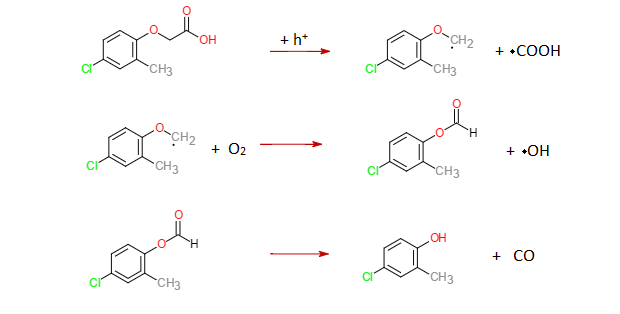
Oxidation of MCPA by positive holes h+

MCPA also could be photochemically degraded. Two scheme pathways can be proposed for the formation of the main intermediate, MCP. One scheme is MCPA oxidation by hydroxyl radical, •OH. The hydroxyl radical adds on the ring, followed by radical transfer to the ether carbon. With oxygen present, the addition of the hydroxyl radical leads the cleavage of the ether link, yielding MCP. The other scheme is MCPA oxidation by positive electron holes h+. The positive holes h+ polarize carboxyl group, CH2-COOH bond is split to produce 4-chloro-2-methylphenylformate. With the presence of oxygen, the positive holes h+ oxidation finally yields MCP as well.
