= MA5 =

MA-5 may refer to:

- Marquart MA-5 Charger, an American biplane aircraft design
- Massachusetts's 5th congressional district
- Massachusetts Route 5
- Mercury-Atlas 5, a test flight of Project Mercury
- Mitochonic acid 5, an experimental drug
