= Auxin binding protein =

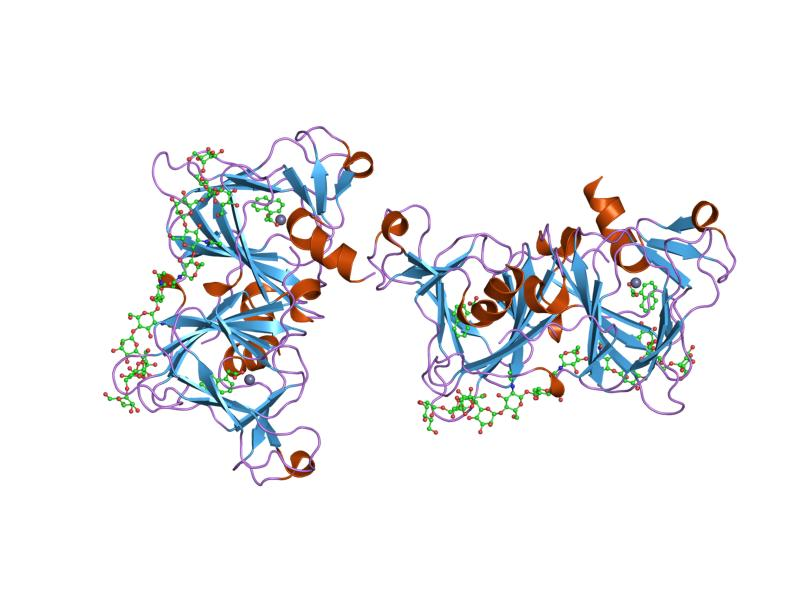
- crystal structure of auxin-binding protein 1 in complex with 1-naphthalene acetic acid

Identifiers
- Symbol: Auxin_BP
- Pfam: PF02041
- Pfam clan: CL0029
- InterPro: IPR000526
- SCOP2: 1lr5 / SCOPe / SUPFAM
Available protein structures:
- PDB: IPR000526 PF02041 (ECOD; PDBsum)
- AlphaFold: IPR000526; PF02041

In molecular biology, the auxin binding protein family is a family of proteins which bind the plant hormone auxin. They are located in the lumen of the endoplasmic reticulum (ER). The primary structure of these proteins contains an N-terminal hydrophobic leader sequence of 30-40 amino acids, which could represent a signal for translocation of the protein to the ER. The mature protein comprises around 165 residues, and contains a number of potential N-glycosylation sites. In vitro transport studies have demonstrated co-translational glycosylation. Retention within the lumen of the ER correlates with an additional signal located at the C terminus, represented by the sequence Lys-Asp-Glu-Leu, known to be responsible for preventing secretion of proteins from the lumen of the ER in eukaryotic cells.

== History ==
The history of Auxin Binding Protein consisted of extensive research for over 40 years, and yet it is still unclear in this century for many researchers to fully know and understand the protein's definitive association with auxin and all of their the potential functions/roles. Early developments in ABP research focused on studying the protein in maize plants since it was found that auxin binds to ABP in the maize coleoptile membranes. From the maize, scientists were able to characterize the properties of ABP's ability to bind with auxin and understand how it interacted with auxin molecules through biochemical studies. A significant point in ABP's history occurred around 1985, when the protein was able to be successfully purified from the maize and genetically cloned. This had allowed scientists to better identify the important and unique specifics of the protein itself. Around the same year, it was also confirmed and verified that ABP does bind to auxin which was later reinforced by the analysis of the crystal structure of ABP when combined with auxin molecules. At some point in the research history of ABP, scientist were unsure of ABP1's importance to the entire plant. Numerous test were done that involved the difficult task of regulating the amounts of ABP in plants, however despite these challenges, important discoveries were made. By regulating the ABP levels to a high in tobacco plants, it was discovered that cell expansion occurred in the plant. It was also found that the interaction between ABP and the tobacco plant supported the idea that Auxin Binding Protein is involved with auxin-responsive potassium currents. These specific points in time and discoveries has allowed many to generalize and understand Auxin Binding Protein better as a receptor for auxin in plants and to further build upon this concept for more discoveries to be made ahead.

== Description ==
The auxin binding protein (ABP) is part of the cupin superfamily of proteins that bind to auxin, which influences auxin responses serving as a receptor. ABP are identified as proteins associated mostly with the cells of plants. All green plants and land plants ranging from bryophytes to angiosperms. The localization of ABP are mostly within the lumen of the endoplasmic reticulum (ER), with small percentages occurring outside on the cell surface/plasma membrane of the cell. The primary structure of these proteins contains an N-terminal hydrophobic leader sequence of 30-40 amino acids, potentially represent a signal for translocation of the protein to the ER. The mature protein comprises around 165 residues, and contains a number of potential N-glycosylation sites, carrying a single or few oligosaccharide chains that are abundant with mannose residues. Retention within the lumen of the ER correlates with an additional signal located at the C terminus, represented by the sequence Lys-Asp-Glu-Leu, known to be responsible for preventing secretion of proteins from the lumen of the ER in eukaryotic cells. Although, it's suggested and theorized that conformational changes to the protein, through binding with auxin, leads to the secretion of ABP to the plasma membrane as the sequence Lys-Asp-Glu-Leu becomes masked. This secretion and localization of a portion of ABP towards the cell surface proposes the idea of why the protein is able to serve as a receptor in plant cells for auxin/non-auxin related processes and interactions despite having majority of ABP in the ER of the cell.

== Functions and roles ==
Auxin Binding Protein's role in the signaling pathway of leaf cells within plants.

Auxin Binding Protein has been known to play an important role in the development of leaves in plants in terms of cell growth and leaf structure. The overexpression of ABP in plants causes leaves to have larger cells and conversely the suppression of ABP leads to smaller cells, slower growth, severe bending, and fewer cells in the surface of the leaves. Any mutations to the protein could result in the leaves to have defects and even disrupt auxin signaling. In the leaves themselves, ABP along with other proteins, such as ROP and PIN, are involved in an auxin signaling pathway that's associated with processes like auxin biosynthesis and indentation. This pathway is essential overall for normal leaf lobe development. To add on, the influence of ABP on leaf development involves interactions with transmembrane proteins as well. Transmembrane proteins like TMK and SPK1 act as receptors where they provide signal transferring from ABP to other cellular components that ultimately affect the flow of auxin, the structure leaves, and the growth of leaves.

Auxin Binding Protein also play an important role in root development in plants. The reduction of ABP in plants could significantly hinder the speed in which roots grow, it could reduce the size of the meristem (root's growth center), and create root issues like higher slanting of the roots and tropism defects. Within the roots, ABP mostly influence pathways that involve genes such as RBP and PLT. Such pathways involving these genes are known to regulate cellular division during the development of the root and to maintain root stem cells. ABP in roots unlike those in leaves do not have any direct interactions with transmembrane proteins. Instead SPK1 interacts with an inactive ROP, affecting processes that involve the stabilization of actin and endocytosis in roots.

At the transcriptional level, Auxin Binding Protein is important in the gene expression in plants. If the protein is inactivated, it affects the expression/transcription of specific genes called Aux/IAA, which are managed by the SCFTIR1/AFB system which is a critical pathway in plant hormone signaling. Furthermore, ABP acts as a negative regulator, allowing Aux/IAA to be more stable and repress any unusual effects that the SCFTIR1/AFB system may cause. This repression and stabilization can influence how plants responds to auxin, with differing effects in the roots and shoots of plants.
