= Quinclorac =

Chemical compound

Names
- Preferred IUPAC name 3,7-Dichloroquinoline-8-carboxylic acid
- Other names Quinchlorac

Identifiers
CAS Number	84087-01-4
3D model (JSmol)	Interactive image
ChEBI	CHEBI:81974
ChemSpider	82837
ECHA InfoCard	100.100.457
KEGG	C18806
PubChem CID	91739
UNII	3J06V625EE
CompTox Dashboard (EPA)	DTXSID6032641
- InChI: InChI=1S/C10H5Cl2NO2/c11-6-3-5-1-2-7(12)8(10(14)15)9(5)13-4-6/h1-4H,(H,14,15) Key: FFSSWMQPCJRCRV-UHFFFAOYSA-N; InChI=1/C10H5Cl2NO2/c11-6-3-5-1-2-7(12)8(10(14)15)9(5)13-4-6/h1-4H,(H,14,15) Key: FFSSWMQPCJRCRV-UHFFFAOYAE
- SMILES: O=C(O)c1c(Cl)ccc2cc(Cl)cnc12

Properties
Chemical formula	C_{10}H_{5}Cl_{2}NO_{2}
Molar mass	242.06 g·mol^{−1}
- Except where otherwise noted, data are given for materials in their standard state (at 25 °C [77 °F], 100 kPa). Infobox references

Quinclorac is an organic compound with the formula C_{9}NH_{4}Cl_{2}CO_{2}H. A colorless solid, it is soluble in hydrocarbons and alcohols. The compound is the carboxylic acid of 3,7-dichloroquinoline.

== Applications ==
Quinclorac is an herbicide used primarily to control crabgrass. It is found in some household herbicides for lawn use. Most lawn maintenance companies use the product for the control of annual grass weeds like crabgrass.

Quinclorac is a synthetic auxin. Heap considers it to also have a cellulose herbicide action, although some studies show quinclorac to have no cellulose action.

== Regulation and registration ==
Quinclorac is not approved to use in the European Union due to toxicity concerns.

== Resistance ==
Resistance to quinclorac is of concern in soybean cultivation. In rice, Graminaceous resistance is produced by the cytochrome enzyme CYP81A6.
