= Fuel Economy Reform Act =

The Fuel Economy Reform Act was a bill (S. 3694 in the 109th United States Congress and S. 767 and S. 768 in the 110th United States Congress) sponsored by seven Democrats and four Republicans including Barack Obama and Richard Lugar. It set a goal of raising mandated Corporate Average Fuel Economy fleet standards by 4% per year, approximately one mile per gallon. The bill also provided tax incentives for retooling production. Fuel economy increases were subject to the authority of the National Highway Traffic Safety Administration, part of the executive branch. Thus Obama and Lugar remarked upon introducing their bill, "Mr. President, we embrace the call upon Congress to improve the executive branch's authority to reform and strengthen fuel economy standards."

These bills were introduced in the Senate, but did not pass. (see list of bills sponsored by Barack Obama in the United States Senate) However, according to Obama's advisors, "virtually the exact same set of proposals" were enacted by Congress 18 months later in December 2007, when the Energy Independence and Security Act of 2007 was passed.
