= Peter Boysen Jensen =

Danish biologist (1883–1959)

- Born: 18 January 1883; Hjerting, Denmark
- Died: 21 November 1959 (aged 76); Diakonissestiftelsen; Frederiksberg, Denmark
- Education: University of Copenhagen
- Scientific career
- Fields: Plant physiology
- Thesis: The breakdown of sugar during the respiration process in higher plants

Peter Boysen Jensen (18 January 1883 – 21 November 1959) was a Danish plant physiologist. His research was fundamental to further work on the auxin theory of tropisms.

== Early life and education ==
Peter was born in Hjerting, near Esbjerg in southern Jutland. Being raised on a farm, he discovered early his affinity to nature. He studied botany during his first premed year, and decided to focus on plant physiology after being influenced by ecologist Eugenius Warming. Rasmus Pedersen (1840–1905) and Wilhelm Johannsen (1857–1927) were Boysen Jensen's plant physiology teachers and advisors. While he was a college student in Copenhagen however, neither of these was actively involved in experimental plant physiology. In 1908, Boysen Jensen earned the degree of magister scientiarum. He spent three months of the following year in Wilhelm Pfeffer's Leipzig lab and another four with the biochemist Ernst Schulze in Zürich. Boysen Jensen completed his doctoral studies in 1910, with the thesis The breakdown of sugar during the respiration process in higher plants.

== Career ==
In 1907, Boysen Jensen was appointed scientific assistant at the University of Copenhagen's Plant Physiology Laboratory. He gradually took over all teaching of plant physiology in the department and was lecturer in plant physiology at the same institution from 1922 to 1927. He succeeded Wilhelm Johannsen as professor of plant physiology in 1927, and served in that position until 1948. He became a member of the Royal Danish Academy of Sciences and Letters in 1929, and in 1951, he was appointed honorary doctor at the University of Oslo.

== Phototropism ==
Charles Darwin, and his son Francis had demonstrated in 1881 that when a grass shoot (coleoptile) grows towards light coming from the side (phototropism), it is the tip of the shoot that senses the light, and not the lower part of the shoot (hypocotyl), which is otherwise the part that curves towards the light.

Peter Boysen Jensen showed in 1910 that the phototropic stimulus in an oat coleoptile is mobile and can propagate through an incision. These experiments were published in more detail in French in 1911, and in German in 1913. He found that the tip of the coleoptile could be cut off and reattached, and that subsequent unilateral illumination was still able to produce a positive phototropic curvature in the hypocotyl. He posited that transmission could take place through a thin layer of gelatin that separated the unilaterally illuminated tip from the lower part of the coleoptile. By inserting a piece of impermeable mica, he was able to block transmission in the illuminated and non-illuminated sides of the tip respectively, allowing him to show that transmission occurred in the shadow side of the illuminated tip, and triggered increased growth in the longitudinal shadow side of the coleoptile, resulting in the coleoptile curving towards the light.

In 1911, Boysen Jensen concluded from his experimental results that the transmission of the phototropic stimulus was not a physical effect (e.g. due to a change in pressure), but "serait dû à une migration de substance ou d'ions" (must be due to the transport of a substance or of ions). These results were fundamental to understanding phototropism and paved the way to the discovery of the plant growth hormone, auxin.
