= Indole-3-butyric acid =

Names
- Preferred IUPAC name 4-(1H-Indol-3-yl)butanoic acid
- Other names 1H-Indole-3-butanoic acid Indole-3-butyric acid 3-Indolebutyric acid Indolebutyric acid IBA

Identifiers
CAS Number	133-32-4
3D model (JSmol)	Interactive image
Beilstein Reference	171120
ChEBI	CHEBI:33070
ChEMBL	ChEMBL582878
ChemSpider	8298
DrugBank	DB02740
ECHA InfoCard	100.004.638
EC Number	205-101-5
Gmelin Reference	143637
KEGG	C11284
PubChem CID	8617
RTECS number	NL5250000
UNII	061SKE27JP
CompTox Dashboard (EPA)	DTXSID8032623
- InChI: InChI=1S/C12H13NO2/c14-12(15)7-3-4-9-8-13-11-6-2-1-5-10(9)11/h1-2,5-6,8,13H,3-4,7H2,(H,14,15) Key: JTEDVYBZBROSJT-UHFFFAOYSA-N; InChI=1/C12H13NO2/c14-12(15)7-3-4-9-8-13-11-6-2-1-5-10(9)11/h1-2,5-6,8,13H,3-4,7H2,(H,14,15) Key: JTEDVYBZBROSJT-UHFFFAOYAT
- SMILES: O=C(O)CCCc1c[nH]c2ccccc12

Properties
Chemical formula	C_{12}H_{13}NO_{2}
Molar mass	203.241 g·mol^{−1}
Appearance	White to light yellow crystals
Density	1.252 g/cm^{3}
Melting point	125 °C (257 °F; 398 K)
Boiling point	Decomposes
Solubility in water	250 mg/L @20°C

Structure
Crystal structure	cubic

Hazards
- GHS labelling
Pictograms	(GHS06: Toxic) (GHS07: Exclamation mark)
Signal word	Danger
Hazard statements	H301, H315, H319, H335
Precautionary statements	P261, P264, P270, P271, P280, P301+P310, P302+P352, P304+P340, P305+P351+P338, P312, P321, P330, P332+P313, P337+P313, P362, P403+P233, P405, P501
Flash point	211.8 °C (413.2 °F; 484.9 K)
Safety data sheet (SDS)	Oxford MSDS

Related compounds
Related	auxin indole-3-acetic acid
- Except where otherwise noted, data are given for materials in their standard state (at 25 °C [77 °F], 100 kPa). verify (what is ?) Infobox references

Indole-3-butyric acid (1H-indole-3-butanoic acid, IBA) is a white to light-yellow crystalline solid, with the molecular formula C_{12}H_{13}NO_{2}. It melts at 125°C in atmospheric pressure. IBA is a plant hormone in the auxin family and is an ingredient in many commercial horticultural plant rooting products.

== Plant hormone ==
Since IBA is not completely soluble in water, it is typically dissolved in 75% aqueous ethanol (aqua vitae) for use in plant rooting, making a solution of between 10,000 and 50,000 ppm. This alcohol solution is then diluted with distilled water to the desired concentration. IBA is also available as a alkali metal salt, which is soluble in water. The solution should be kept in a cool, dark place for best results.

This compound had been thought to be strictly synthetic; however, it was reported that the compound was isolated from leaves and seeds of maize and other species. In maize, IBA has been shown to be biosynthesized in vivo from IAA and other compounds as precursors. This chemical may also be extracted from any of the Salix (Willow) genus.

== Plant tissue culture ==
In plant tissue culture, IBA and other auxins are used to initiate root formation in vitro in a procedure called micropropagation. Micropropagation of plants is the process of using small samples of plants called explants and causing them to undergo growth of differentiated or undifferentiated cells. In connection with cytokinins like kinetin, auxins like IBA can be used to cause the formation of masses of undifferentiated cells called callus. Callus formation is often used as a first step process in micropropagation where the callus cells are then caused to form other tissues such as roots by exposing them to certain hormones like auxins that produce roots. The process of callus to root formation is called indirect organogenesis whereas if roots are formed from the explant directly it is called direct organogenesis.

In a study of Camellia sinensis, the effect of three different auxins, IBA, IAA and NAA were examined to determine the relative effect of each auxin on root formation. According to the result for the species, IBA was shown to produce a higher yield of roots compared to the other auxins. The effect of IBA is in concurrence with other studies where IBA is the most commonly used auxin for root formation.

== Mechanism ==
Although the exact method of how IBA works is still largely unknown, genetic evidence has been found that suggests that IBA may be converted into IAA through a similar process to β-oxidation of fatty acids. The conversion of IBA to IAA then suggests that IBA works as a storage sink for IAA in plants. There is other evidence that suggests that IBA is not converted to IAA but acts as an auxin on its own.
