= 1-Naphthaleneacetamide =

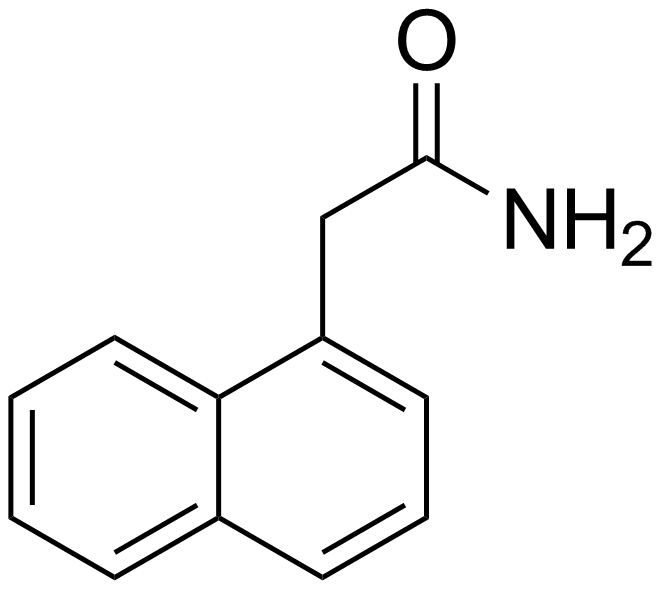

Names
- Preferred IUPAC name 2-(Naphthalen-1-yl)acetamide
- Other names 1-Naphthylacetamide

Identifiers
CAS Number	86-86-2
3D model (JSmol)	Interactive image; Interactive image
ChEBI	CHEBI:81810
ChemSpider	6600
ECHA InfoCard	100.001.550
PubChem CID	6861
UNII	11KAX3RJ28
CompTox Dashboard (EPA)	DTXSID3020914
- InChI: InChI=1S/C12H11NO/c13-12(14)8-10-6-3-5-9-4-1-2-7-11(9)10/h1-7H,8H2,(H2,13,14) Key: XFNJVKMNNVCYEK-UHFFFAOYSA-N; InChI=1/C12H11NO/c13-12(14)8-10-6-3-5-9-4-1-2-7-11(9)10/h1-7H,8H2,(H2,13,14) Key: XFNJVKMNNVCYEK-UHFFFAOYAN
- SMILES: C1=CC=C2C(=C1)C=CC=C2CC(=O)N; O=C(N)Cc2cccc1ccccc12

Properties
Chemical formula	C_{12}H_{11}NO
Molar mass	185.222 g/mol
Magnetic susceptibility (χ)	−117.8·10^{−6} cm^{3}/mol
- Except where otherwise noted, data are given for materials in their standard state (at 25 °C [77 °F], 100 kPa). verify (what is ?) Infobox references

1-Naphthaleneacetamide (NAAm) is a synthetic auxin that acts as a rooting hormone. NAAm is potentially genotoxic and cytotoxic on human peripheral blood lymphocytes in vitro.

It can be found in commercial products such as Rootone.

== See also ==
- 1-Naphthaleneacetic acid
- Plant hormones
