= Bif2 barren inflorescence2 =

== bif2 barren inflorescence2 gene in Maize ==
barren inflorescence phenotype of recessive mutation in bif2, with greatly reduced number of tassel branches, spikelets, and anthers. Photographed by Paula McSteen, University of Missouri. Columbia, MO USA 65211.

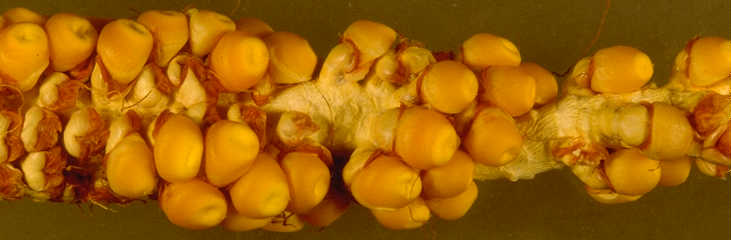
Homozygous bif2-N2354 ear has barren patches. Courtesy of M Gerald Neuffer, Missouri USA

(maize gene reviews submitted to the Maize Genetics Cooperation Newsletter as a way to enable community curation of MaizeGDB are being moved, 2013-14, with author permissions to the wikipedia, and will be grouped to the wiki page maize genes. The initial summary statements for each gene have been previously included in MaizeGDB)

Function. Regulation of auxin transport during axillary Meristem and lateral organ initiation.

Summary The bif2 mutation affects all axillary meristems in the plant. The tassel has fewer branches, spikelets, florets and floral organs (McSteen and Hake 2001). The ear shoot, if it forms, has very few kernels. The mutant plants also have defects in vegetative development as they make fewer tillers (in a tb1 mutant background) and make one or two fewer leaves than normal. The bif2 gene encodes a serine threonine protein kinase (McSteen et al 2007) that phosphorylates auxin efflux carrier ZmPIN1a (Skirpan et al 2008) and BHLH transcription factor BARREN STALK1 (Skirpan et al 2008). Natural variation in bif2 alleles are associated with tassel branch number and plant height (Pressoir et al 2009).

First report. Briggs and Johal 1992

Chromosome Location Based on B-A chromosomal translocation data and tight linkage to the RFLP marker umc67a (McSteen and Hake 2001) and the 2010 B73_v2 maize reference genome sequence assembly. Genetically mapped SNPs near the gene include rs131816257, rs131816315, and rs131816316.

Phenotypes Mutations in the gene produce plants where tassels, or male inflorescences have fewer branches, spikelets, florets and floral organs. The ear shoot or female inflorescence, if it forms, has very few kernels. Natural variations of the bif2 gene have been found to affect tassel branch number and plant height (Pressoir et al 2009)

Gene Product Serine/threonine protein kinase that phosphorylates the PIN1a (Skirpan et al 2009) and BA2 proteins in vitro.

=== LINKS ===
- MaizeGDB NCBI Gene UniProt Neuffer Phenotype Images
