= Global Poverty Act =

The Global Poverty Act was a bill in the U.S. Congress co-sponsored by 84 Representatives and 30 Senators.

The Global Poverty Act would have required the U.S. President to develop and implement a comprehensive strategy to further the United States foreign policy objective of promoting the reduction of global poverty, the elimination of extreme global poverty, and the achievement of the United Nations Millennium Development Goal of reducing by one-half the proportion of people worldwide, between 1990 and 2015, who live on less than $1 per day. This would require the United States to add 0.7 percent of the U.S. gross national product (23 billion to 98 billion a year) to its overall spending on Humanitarian Aid. This bill has been endorsed by Habitat for Humanity, Bread for the World, RESULTS and CARE.

The bill passed the Foreign Affairs Committee in July 2008. It was never scheduled for a vote on the Senate floor, however, and died at the end of the session.

== Timeline ==
- March 1, 2007: Introduced in the U.S. House of Representatives by Congressman Adam Smith (D-WA).
- Jul 31, 2007: Scheduled for debate in the House.
- September 25, 2007: Passed in the House of Representatives by voice vote.
- September 26, 2007: Received in the Senate and read twice; referred to the Committee on Foreign Relations.
- December 7, 2007: Introduced and sponsored in the US Senate by Sen. Barack Obama(D-IL) as S.2433.
- February 13, 2008: Committee on Foreign Relations. Ordered to be reported with amendments favorably.
- April 24, 2008: Committee on Foreign Relations. Reported by Senator Joseph Biden with amendments and an amendment to the title. With written report No. 110-331. Placed on Senate Legislative Calendar under General Orders.
