= SUPERthrive =

Vitamin to enhance plant growth

SUPERthrive is a concentrated non-toxic vitamin solution that claims to enhance plant growth. It contains .09% vitamin B_{1} and a proprietary plant health formula based in kelp. Superthrive has been available since 1940.

Superthrive was developed by Dr. John A. A. Thomson in 1939 and is manufactured by the Vitamin Institute in North Hollywood, California. Thomson was the first chemist to receive the National Lawn & Garden Marketing & Distribution Association's Lifetime Achievement Award in 2006. Thomson managed the Vitamin Institute for 72 years before passing management to his daughter Patrisha Thomson who currently serves as company President.

== See also ==
- Hydroponics
- Fertilizer
- Kelp
