= Deceptive Practices and Voter Intimidation Prevention Act =

The Deceptive Practices and Voter Intimidation Prevention Act of 2007 (S. 453) was a bill introduced in the 110th Congress of the U.S. on January 31, 2007, by Sen. Barack Obama, Democrat of Illinois and Sen. Chuck Schumer, Democrat of New York. The bill was referred to the United States Senate Committee on the Judiciary and on October 4, 2007, was referred to the Senate, although it never received a vote.

A similar version of this bill was introduced by Obama in the 109th Congress on November 16, 2006 (S. 4069) "to protect Americans from tactics that intimidate voters and prevent them from exercising their right to vote on Election Day."

During the 2006 mid-term elections, material was distributed by Republicans in predominantly African American counties in Maryland falsely claiming that prominent African-American Democrats had endorsed the Republican candidates. The fliers were paid for and authorized by Senate candidate Michael S. Steele and Governor Robert Ehrlich, and were widely decried as fraudulent by critics.

"One of our most sacred rights as Americans is the right to make our voice heard at the polls," said Obama in his introductory remarks on the 2006 bill. "But too often, we hear reports of mysterious phone calls and mailers arriving just days before an election that seek to mislead and threaten voters to keep them from the polls. And those who engage in these deceptive and underhanded campaign tactics usually target voters living in minority or low-income neighborhoods. This legislation would ensure that for the first time, these incidents are fully investigated and that those found guilty are punished."

The most recent action was taken by the Senate on May 26, 2021. The bill was read twice and referred to the Committee on the Judiciary.

== See also ==
- Election fraud
