= Auxin =

Plant hormone

Native auxins

Indole-3-acetic acid (IAA) is the most abundant and the basic auxin natively occurring and functioning in plants. It generates the majority of auxin effects in intact plants, and is the most potent native auxin.

There are four more endogenously synthesized auxins in plants.
All auxins are compounds with aromatic ring and a carboxylic acid group:

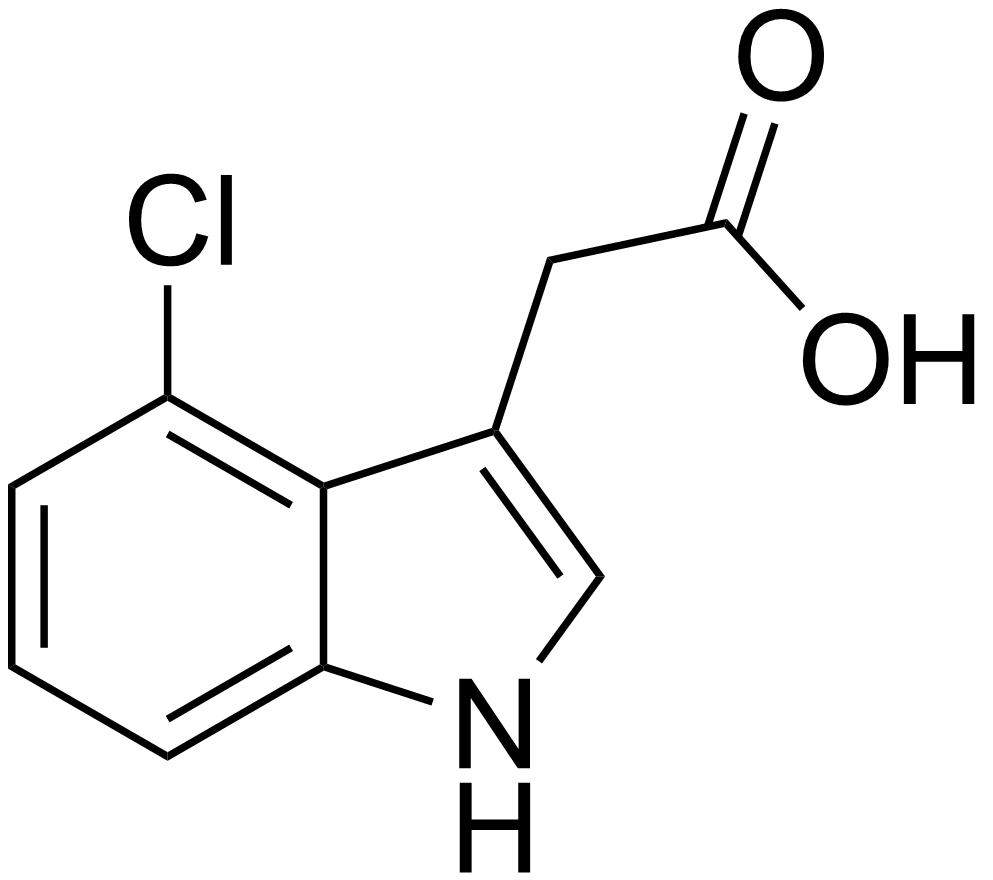
4-Chloroindole-3-acetic acid (4-CI-IAA)

phenylacetic acid (PAA)

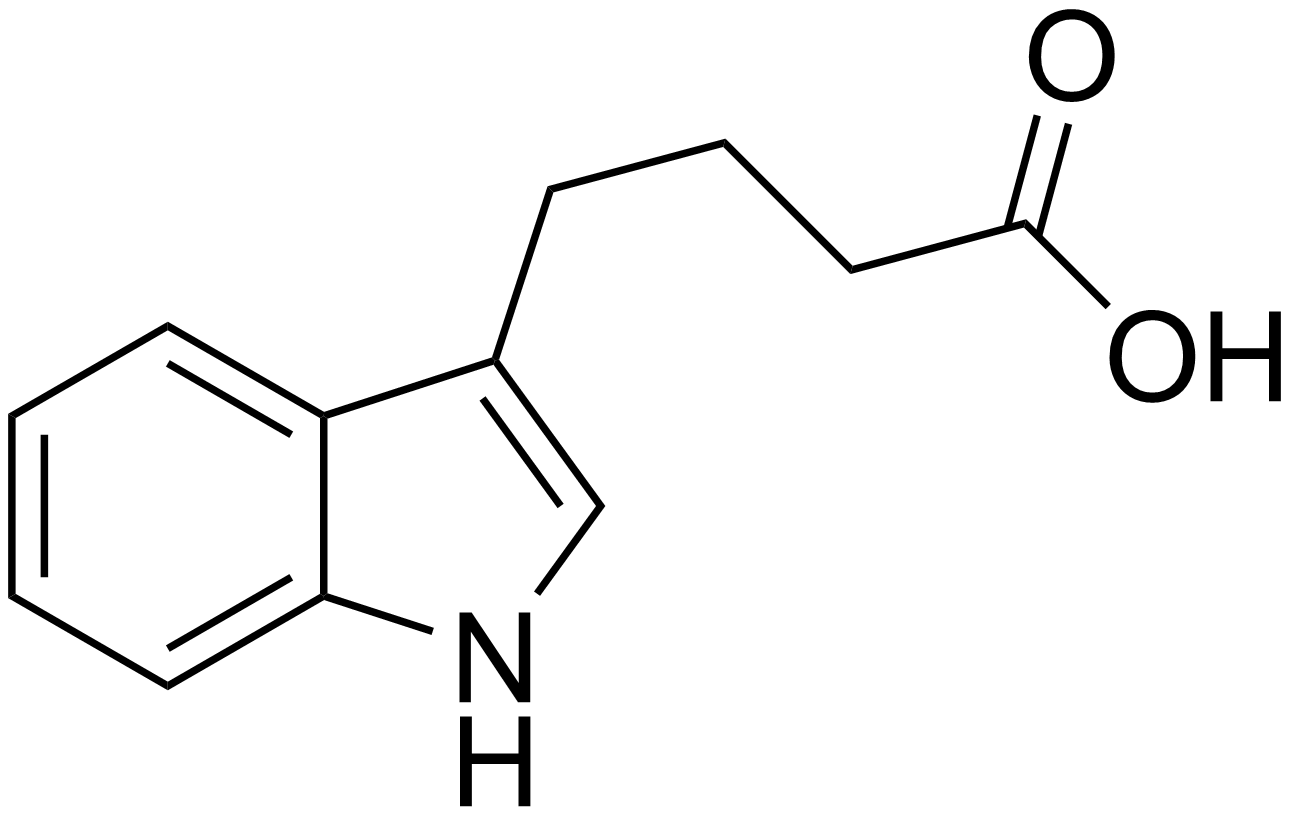
Indole-3-butyric acid (IBA)

Indole-3-propionic acid (IPA)

For representatives of synthetic auxins, see: Auxin § Synthetic auxins.

Auxins (plural of auxin /ˈɔːksɪn/) are a class of plant hormones (or plant-growth regulators) with some morphogen-like characteristics. Auxins play a cardinal role in coordination of many growth and behavioral processes in plant life cycles and are essential for plant body development. The Dutch biologist Frits Warmolt Went first described auxins and their role in plant growth in the 1920s. Kenneth V. Thimann became the first to isolate one of these phytohormones and to determine its chemical structure as indole-3-acetic acid (IAA). Went and Thimann co-authored a book on plant hormones, Phytohormones, in 1937.

== Overview ==
Auxins were the first of the major plant hormones to be discovered. They derive their name from the Greek word αὔξειν (auxein – 'to grow/increase'). Auxin is present in all parts of a plant, although in very different concentrations. The concentration in each position is crucial developmental information, so it is subject to tight regulation through both metabolism and transport. The result is the auxin creates "patterns" of auxin concentration maxima and minima in the plant body, which in turn guide further development of respective cells, and ultimately of the plant as a whole.

The (dynamic and environment responsive) pattern of auxin distribution within the plant is a key factor for plant growth, its reaction to its environment, and specifically for development of plant organs (such as leaves or flowers). It is achieved through very complex and well-coordinated active transport of auxin molecules from cell to cell throughout the plant body—by the so-called polar auxin transport. Thus, a plant can (as a whole) react to external conditions and adjust to them, without requiring a nervous system. Auxins typically act in concert with, or in opposition to, other plant hormones. For example, the ratio of auxin to cytokinin in certain plant tissues determines initiation of root versus shoot buds.

On the molecular level, all auxins are compounds with an aromatic ring and a carboxylic acid group. The most important member of the auxin family is indole-3-acetic acid (IAA), which generates the majority of auxin effects in intact plants, and is the most potent native auxin. And as native auxin, its equilibrium is controlled in many ways in plants, from synthesis, through possible conjugation to degradation of its molecules, always according to the requirements of the situation. Auxin can act in a heat sensitive manner in many situations, which will in turn affect a plant's phenotypic development.

- Five naturally occurring (endogenous) auxins in plants include indole-3-acetic acid, 4-chloroindole-3-acetic acid, phenylacetic acid, indole-3-butyric acid, and indole-3-propionic acid. However, most of the knowledge described so far in auxin biology and as described in the sections which follow, apply basically to IAA; the other three endogenous auxins seems to have marginal importance for intact plants in natural environments. Alongside endogenous auxins, scientists and manufacturers have developed many synthetic compounds with auxinic activity.
- Synthetic auxins fall into four classes:
  - dicamba
  - quinolinecarboxylic acids, which includes quinclorac
  - derivatives of pyridinecarboxylic acids, which includes picloram, triclopyr, clopyralid
  - phenoxyacetic acid, phenoxypropionic acid, and phenoxybutyric acid, 1-naphthaleneacetic acid derivatives 2,4-D, 2,4-DP 2,4-DB 2,4,5-T MCPA MCPB, mecoprop

Some synthetic auxins, such as 2,4-D and 2,4,5-trichlorophenoxyacetic acid (2,4,5-T), are sold as herbicides. Broad-leaf plants (dicots), such as dandelions, are much more susceptible to auxins than narrow-leaf plants (monocots) such as grasses and cereal crops, making these synthetic auxins valuable as herbicides.

== Discovery ==
=== Charles Darwin ===
In 1881, Charles Darwin and his son Francis performed experiments on coleoptiles, the sheaths enclosing young leaves in germinating grass seedlings. The experiment exposed the coleoptile to light from a unidirectional source, and observed that they bend towards the light. By covering various parts of the coleoptiles with a light-impermeable opaque cap, the Darwins discovered that light is detected by the coleoptile tip, but that bending occurs in the hypocotyl. However the seedlings showed no signs of development towards light if the tip was covered with an opaque cap, or if the tip was removed. The Darwins concluded that the tip of the coleoptile was responsible for sensing light, and proposed that a messenger is transmitted in a downward direction from the tip of the coleoptile, causing it to bend.

=== Peter Boysen Jensen ===
In 1910, Danish scientist Peter Boysen Jensen demonstrated that the phototropic stimulus in the oat coleoptile could propagate through an incision. These experiments were extended and published in greater detail in 1911 and 1913. He found that the tip could be cut off and put back on, and that a subsequent one-sided illumination was still able to produce a positive phototropic curvature in the basal part of the coleoptile. He demonstrated that the transmission could take place through a thin layer of gelatin separating the unilaterally illuminated tip from the shaded stump. By inserting a piece of mica he could block transmission in the illuminated and non-illuminated side of the tip, respectively, which allowed him to show that the transmission took place in the shaded part of the tip. Thus, the longitudinal half of the coleoptile that exhibits the greater rate of elongation during the phototropic curvature, was the tissue to receive the growth stimulus.

In 1911, Boysen Jensen concluded from his experimental results that the transmission of the phototropic stimulus was not a physical effect (for example due to a change in pressure) but serait dû à une migration de substance ou d'ions (was caused by the transport of a substance or of ions). These results were fundamental for further work on the auxin theory of tropisms.

=== Frits Went ===
In 1928, the Dutch botanist Frits Warmolt Went showed that a chemical messenger diffuses from coleoptile tips. Went's experiment identified how a growth promoting chemical causes a coleoptile to grow towards the light. Went cut the tips of the coleoptiles and placed them in the dark, putting a few tips on agar blocks that he predicted would absorb the growth-promoting chemical. On control coleoptiles, he placed a block that lacked the chemical. On others, he placed blocks containing the chemical, either centered on top of the coleoptile to distribute the chemical evenly or offset to increase the concentration on one side.

When the growth-promoting chemical was distributed evenly the coleoptile grew straight. If the chemical was distributed unevenly, the coleoptile curved away from the side with the cube, as if growing towards the light, even though it was grown in the dark. Went later proposed that the messenger substance is a growth-promoting hormone, which he named auxin, that becomes asymmetrically distributed in the bending region. Went concluded that auxin is at a higher concentration on the shaded side, promoting cell elongation, which results in coleoptiles bending towards the light.

== Hormonal activity ==
Auxins help development at all levels in plants, from the cellular level, through organs, and ultimately to the whole plant.

=== Molecular mechanisms ===
When a plant cell comes into contact with auxin, it causes dramatic changes in gene expression, with many genes up- or down-regulated. The precise mechanisms by which this occurs are still an area of active research, but there is now a general consensus on at least two auxin signalling pathways.

==== Perception ====
The best-characterized auxin receptors are the TIR1/ AFB family of F-box proteins. F-box proteins target other proteins for degradation via the ubiquitin degradation pathway. When TIR1/ AFB proteins bind to auxin, the auxin molecule acts as a 'molecular glue', a term coined by Ning Zheng, that allows these proteins to then bind to their targets (see below). The atomic structure of the perception mechanism of auxin by TIR1 was determined by X-ray crystallography.

Another auxin-binding protein, ABP1 is now often regarded as an auxin receptor (at the apoplast), but it is generally considered to have a much more minor role than the TIR1/AFB signaling pathway, and much less is known about ABP1 signaling.

==== Aux/IAA and ARF signalling modules ====
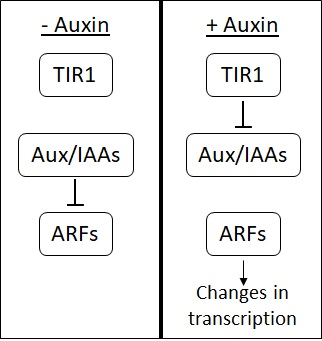
The auxin signal cascade: In the absence of auxin, Aux/IAA bind to and suppress the transcriptional activity of ARFs. When auxin is present it forms a 'molecular glue' between TIR1 and Aux/IAAs, which leads to the degradation of these repressors. ARFs are then free to bind to DNA and to cause changes in transcription.

Auxin response factors (ARFs) are a large group of transcription factors that act in auxin signaling. In the absence of auxin, ARFs bind to a class of repressors known as Aux/IAAs. Aux/IAA suppress the ability of ARFs to enhance gene transcription. Additionally, the binding of Aux/IAA to ARFs brings Aux/IAA into contact with the promoters of auxin-regulated genes. When at these promoters, Aux/IAA repress the expression of these genes through recruiting other factors to make modifications to the DNA structure.

The binding of auxin to TIR1/AFBs allows them to bind to Aux/IAAs. When bound by TIR1/AFBs, Aux/IAAs are marked for degradation. The degradation of Aux/IAA frees ARF proteins, which are then able to activate or repress genes at whose promoters they are bound.

The large number of Aux/IAA and ARF binding pairs possible, and their different distributions between cell types and across developmental age are thought to account for the astonishingly diverse responses that auxin produces.

In June 2018, it was demonstrated that plant tissues can respond to auxin in a TIR1-dependent manner extremely quickly (probably too quickly to be explained by changes in gene expression). This has led some scientists to suggest that there is an as yet unidentified TIR1-dependent auxin-signalling pathway that differs from the well-known transcriptional response.

=== On a cellular level ===
On the cellular level, auxin is essential for cell growth, affecting both cell division and cellular expansion. Auxin concentration level, together with other local factors, contributes to cell differentiation and specification of the cell fate.

Depending on the specific tissue, auxin may promote axial elongation (as in shoots), lateral expansion (as in root swelling), or iso-diametric expansion (as in fruit growth). In some cases (coleoptile growth), auxin-promoted cellular expansion occurs in the absence of cell division. In other cases, auxin-promoted cell division and cell expansion may be closely sequenced within the same tissue (root initiation, fruit growth). In a living plant, auxins and other plant hormones nearly always appear to interact to determine patterns of plant development.

=== Organ patterns ===
Growth and division of plant cells together result in the growth of tissue, and specific tissue growth contributes to the development of plant organs.

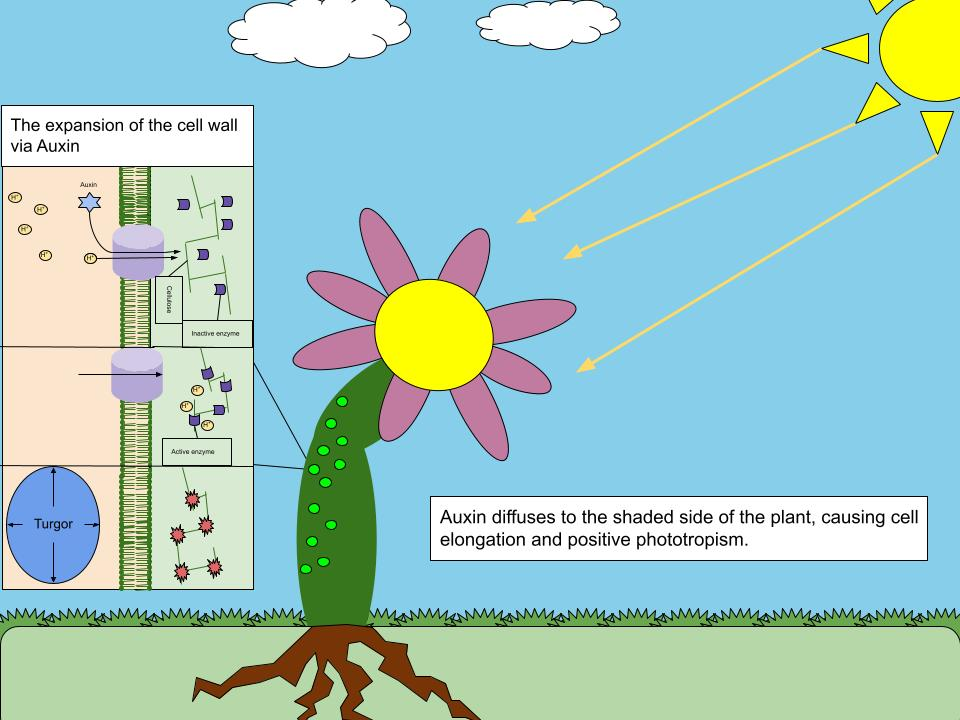
Auxin diffuses along the shaded side of the plant, and causes cellulose in the cell wall to break, allowing turgor (water pressure) to expand the cell.

Growth of cells contributes to the plant's size, unevenly localized growth produces bending, turning and directionalization of organs- for example, stems turning toward light sources (phototropism), roots growing in response to gravity (gravitropism), and other tropisms originated because cells on one side grow faster than the cells on the other side of the organ. So, precise control of auxin distribution between different cells has paramount importance to the resulting form of plant growth and organization.

==== Auxin transport and the uneven distribution of auxin ====
To cause growth in the required domains, auxins must of necessity be active preferentially in them. Local auxin maxima can be formed by active biosynthesis in certain cells of tissues, for example via tryptophan-dependent pathways, but auxins are not synthesized in all cells (even if cells retain the potential ability to do so, only under specific conditions will auxin synthesis be activated in them). For that purpose, auxins have to be not only translocated toward those sites where they are needed but also they must have an established mechanism to detect those sites. Translocation is driven throughout the plant body, primarily from peaks of shoots to peaks of roots (from up to down).

For long distances, relocation occurs via the stream of fluid in phloem vessels, but, for short-distance transport, a unique system of coordinated polar transport directly from cell to cell is exploited. This short-distance, active transport exhibits some morphogenetic properties.

This process, polar auxin transport, is directional, very strictly regulated, and based in uneven distribution of auxin efflux carriers on the plasma membrane, which send auxins in the proper direction. While PIN-FORMED (PIN) proteins are vital in transporting auxin in a polar manner, the family of AUXIN1/LIKE-AUX1 (AUX/LAX) genes encodes for non-polar auxin influx carriers.

The regulation of PIN protein localisation in a cell determines the direction of auxin transport from cell, and concentrated effort of many cells creates peaks of auxin, or auxin maxima (regions having cells with higher auxin – a maximum). Proper and timely auxin maxima within developing roots and shoots are necessary to organise the development of the organ. PINs are regulated by multiple pathways, at both the transcriptional and the post-translational levels. PIN proteins can be phosphorylated by PINOID, which determines their apicobasal polarity and thereby the directionality of auxin fluxes. In addition, other AGC kinases, such as D6PK, phosphorylate and activate PIN transporters. AGC kinases, including PINOID and D6PK, target to the plasma membrane via binding to phospholipids. Upstream of D6PK, 3'-phosphoinositide dependent protein kinase 1 (PDK1) acts as a master regulator. PDK1 phosphorylates and activates D6PK at the basal side of plasma membrane, executing the activity of PIN-mediated polar auxin transport and subsequent plant development. Surrounding auxin maxima are cells with low auxin troughs, or auxin minima. For example, in the Arabidopsis fruit, auxin minima have been shown to be important for its tissue development.

Auxin has a significant effect on spatial and temporal gene expressions during the growth of apical meristems. These interactions depend both on the concentration of Auxin as well as the spatial orientation during primordial positioning. Auxin relies on PIN1 which works as an auxin efflux carrier. PIN1 positioning upon membranes determines the directional flow of the hormone from higher to lower concentrations. Initiation of primordia in apical meristems is correlated to heightened auxin levels. Genes required to specify the identity of cells arrange and express based on levels of auxin. STM (SHOOT MERISTEMLESS), which helps maintain undifferentiated cells, is down-regulated in the presence of auxin. This allows growing cells to differentiate into various plant tissues. The CUC (CUP-SHAPED COTYLEDON) genes set the boundaries for growing tissues and promote growth. They are upregulated via auxin influx. Experiments making use of GFP (GREEN FLUORESCENCE PROTEIN) visualization in Arabidopsis have supported these claims.

=== Organization of the plant ===
As auxins contribute to organ shaping, they are also fundamentally required for proper development of the plant itself. Without hormonal regulation and organization, plants would be merely proliferating heaps of similar cells. Auxin employment begins in the embryo of the plant, where the directional distribution of auxin ushers in subsequent growth and development of primary growth poles, then forms buds of future organs. Next, it helps to coordinate proper development of the arising organs, such as roots, cotyledons, and leaves and mediates long-distance signals between them, contributing so to the overall architecture of the plant. Throughout the plant's life, auxin helps the plant maintain the polarity of growth, and actually "recognize" where it has its branches (or any organ) connected.

An important principle of plant organization based upon auxin distribution is apical dominance, which means the auxin produced by the apical bud (or growing tip) diffuses (and is transported) downwards and inhibits the development of ulterior lateral bud growth, which would otherwise compete with the apical tip for light and nutrients. Removing the apical tip and its suppressively acting auxin allows the lower dormant lateral buds to develop, and the buds between the leaf stalk and stem produce new shoots which compete to become the lead growth. The process is actually quite complex because auxin transported downwards from the lead shoot tip has to interact with several other plant hormones (such as strigolactones or cytokinins) in the process on various positions along the growth axis in plant body to achieve this phenomenon. This plant behavior is used in pruning by horticulturists.

Finally, the sum of auxin arriving from stems to roots influences the degree of root growth. If shoot tips are removed, the plant does not react just by the outgrowth of lateral buds — which are supposed to replace to original lead. It also follows that smaller amount of auxin arriving at the roots results in slower growth of roots and the nutrients are subsequently in higher degree invested in the upper part of the plant, which hence starts to grow faster.

== Effects ==
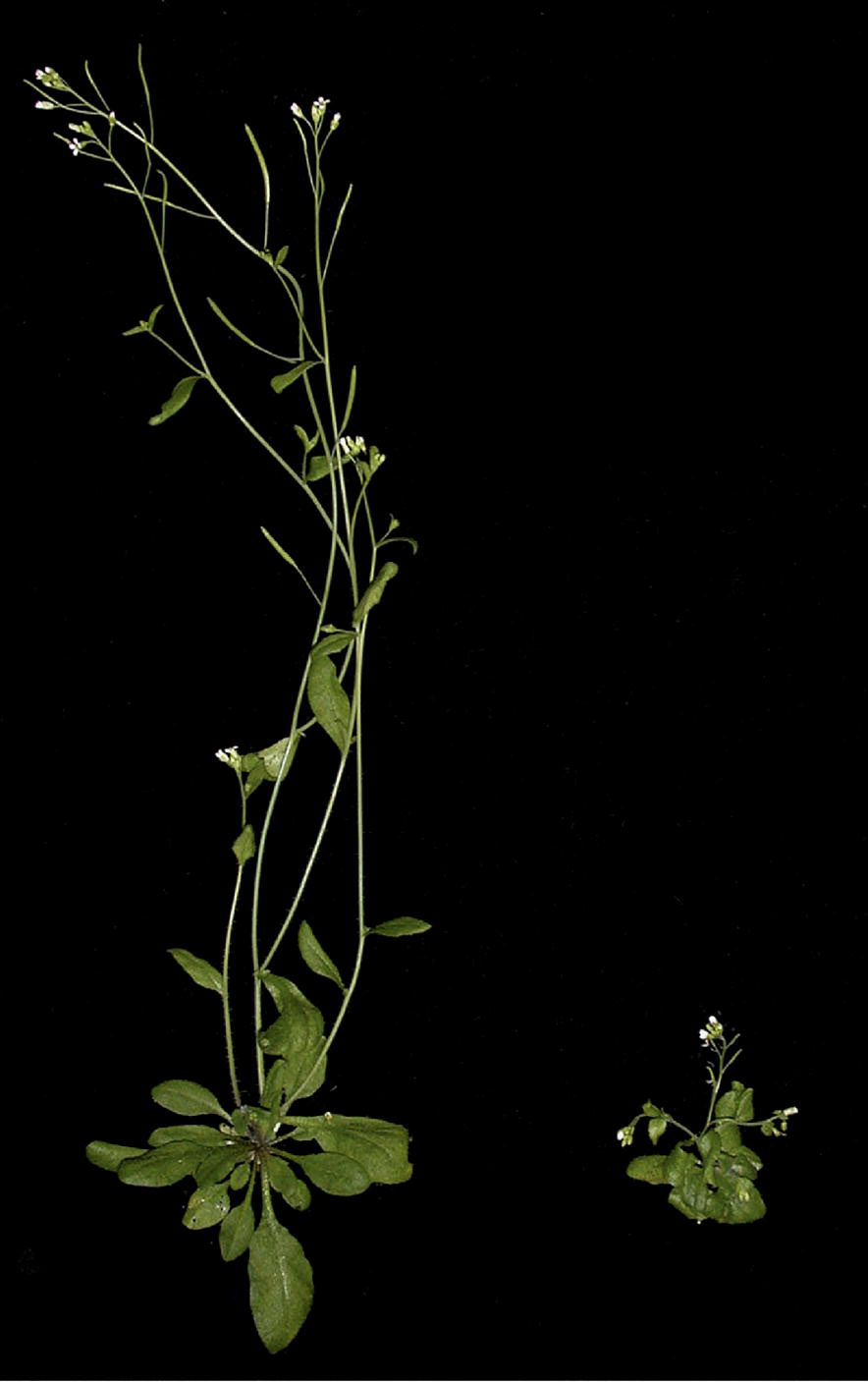
A healthy Arabidopsis thaliana plant (left) next to an auxin signal-transduction mutant with a repressed response to auxin.

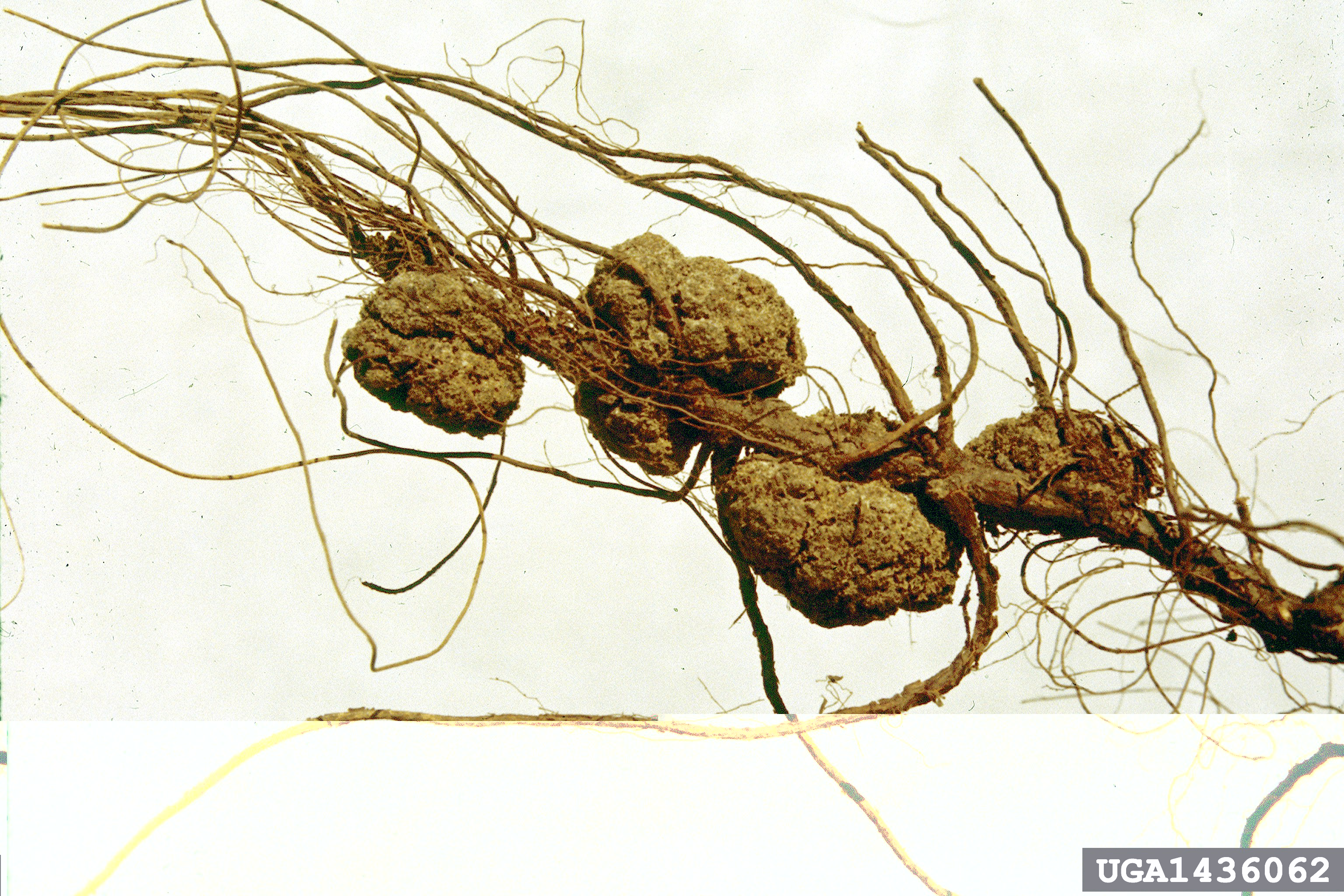
Crown galls are caused by Agrobacterium tumefaciens bacteria; they produce and secrete auxin and cytokinin, which interfere with normal cell division and cause tumors.

Auxin participates in phototropism, geotropism, hydrotropism and other developmental changes. The uneven distribution of auxin, due to environmental cues, such as unidirectional light or gravity force, results in uneven plant tissue growth, and generally, auxin governs the form and shape of the plant body, direction and strength of growth of all organs, and their mutual interaction. When the cells grow larger, their volume increases as the intracellular solute concentration increases with water moving into the cells from extracellular fluid. This auxin-stimulated intake of water causes turgor pressure on the cell walls, causing the plant to bend.

Auxin stimulates cell elongation by stimulating wall-loosening factors, such as expansins, to loosen cell walls. The effect is stronger if gibberellins are also present. Auxin also stimulates cell division if cytokinins are present. When auxin and cytokinin are applied to callus, rooting can be generated with higher auxin to cytokinin ratios, shoot growth is induced by lower auxin to cytokinin ratios, and a callus is formed with intermediate ratios, with the exact threshold ratios depending on the species and the original tissue. Auxin also induces sugar and mineral accumulation at the site of application.

=== Wound response ===
Auxin induces the formation and organization of phloem and xylem. When the plant is wounded, the auxin may induce the cell differentiation and regeneration of the vascular tissues.

=== Root growth and development ===
Auxins promote root initiation. Auxin induces both growth of pre-existing roots and root branching (lateral root initiation), and also adventitious root formation. As more native auxin is transported down the stem to the roots, the overall development of the roots is stimulated. If the source of auxin is removed, such as by trimming the tips of stems, the roots are less stimulated accordingly, and growth of stem is supported instead.

In horticulture, auxins, especially NAA and IBA, are commonly applied to stimulate root initiation when rooting cuttings of plants. However, high concentrations of auxin inhibit root elongation and instead enhance adventitious root formation. Removal of the root tip can lead to inhibition of secondary root formation.

=== Apical dominance ===
Auxin induces shoot apical dominance; the axillary buds are inhibited by auxin, as a high concentration of auxin directly stimulates ethylene synthesis in axillary buds, causing inhibition of their growth and potentiation of apical dominance. When the apex of the plant is removed, the inhibitory effect is removed and the growth of lateral buds is enhanced. This is called decapitation, usually performed in tea plantations and hedge-making. Auxin is sent to the part of the plant facing away from the light, where it promotes cell elongation, thus causing the plant to bend towards the light.

=== Fruit growth and development ===
Auxin is required for fruit growth and development and delays fruit senescence. When seeds are removed from strawberries, fruit growth is stopped; exogenous auxin stimulates the growth in fruits with seeds removed. For fruit with unfertilized seeds, exogenous auxin results in parthenocarpy ("virgin-fruit" growth).

Fruits form abnormal morphologies when auxin transport is disturbed. In Arabidopsis fruits, auxin controls the release of seeds from the fruit (pod). The valve margins are a specialised tissue in pods that regulates when pod will open (dehiscence). Auxin must be removed from the valve margin cells to allow the valve margins to form. This process requires modification of the auxin transporters (PIN proteins).

The evolutionary transition from diploid to triploid endosperms - and the production of antipodal cells - may have occurred due to a shift in gametophyte development which produced a new interaction with an auxin-dependent mechanism originating in the earliest angiosperms.

=== Flowering ===
Auxin plays also a minor role in the initiation of flowering and development of reproductive organs. In low concentrations, it can delay the senescence of flowers. A number of plant mutants have been described that affect flowering and have deficiencies in either auxin synthesis or transport. In maize, one example is bif2 barren inflorescence2.

=== Ethylene biosynthesis ===
In low concentrations, auxin can inhibit ethylene formation and transport of precursor in plants; however, high concentrations can induce the synthesis of ethylene. Therefore, the high concentration can induce femaleness of flowers in some species.

Auxin inhibits abscission prior to the formation of the abscission layer, and thus inhibits senescence of leaves.

Synthetic auxins include the following compounds

2,4-Dichlorophenoxyacetic acid (2,4-D); active herbicide and main auxin in laboratory use

α-Naphthalene acetic acid (α-NAA); often part of commercial rooting powders

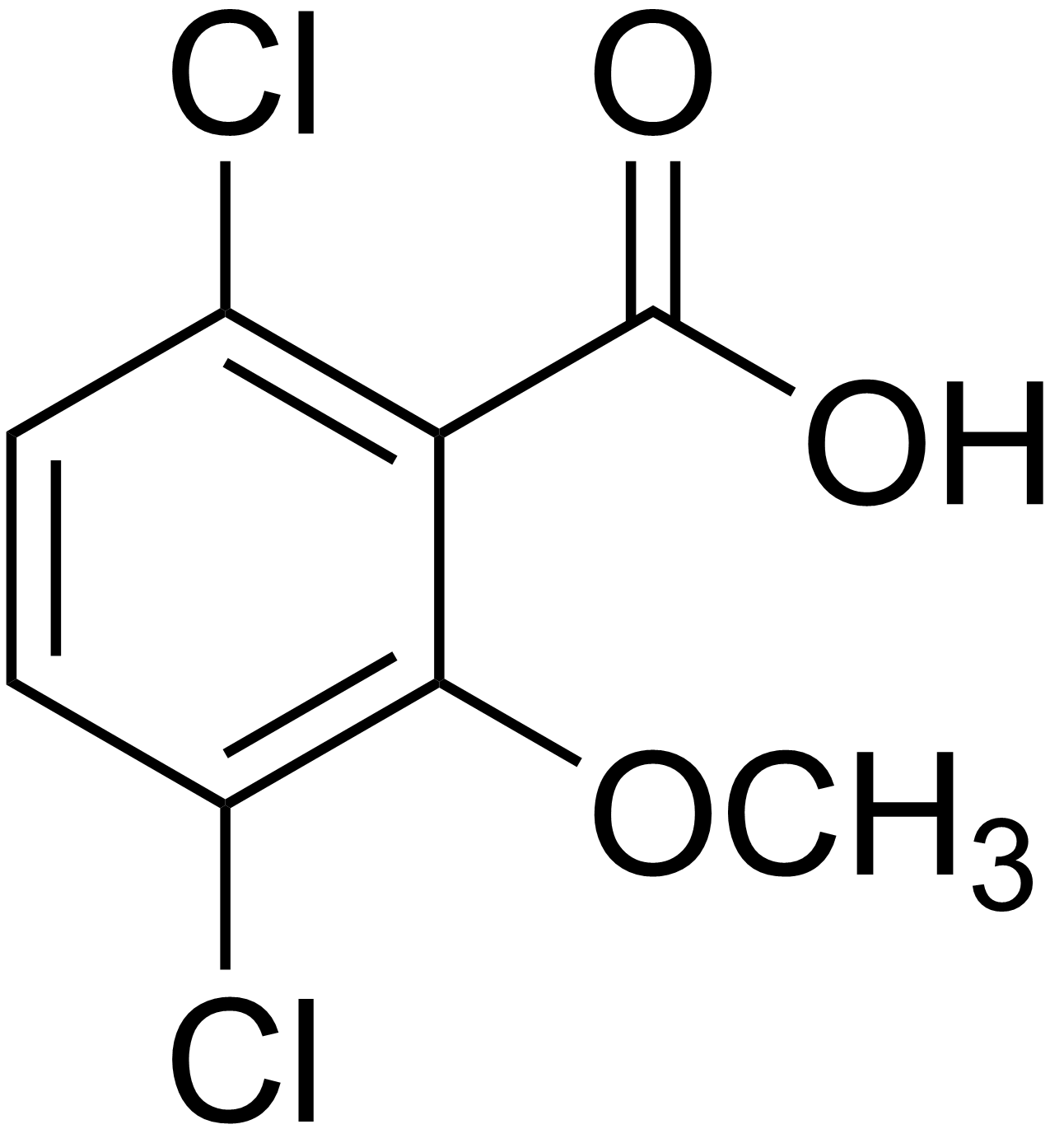
2-Methoxy-3,6-dichlorobenzoic acid (dicamba); active herbicide

4-Amino-3,5,6-trichloropicolinic acid (tordon or picloram); active herbicide

2,4,5-Trichlorophenoxyacetic acid (2,4,5-T)

== Synthetic auxins ==
In the course of research on auxin biology, many compounds with noticeable auxin activity were synthesized. Many of them had been found to have economical potential for human-controlled growth and development of plants in agronomy.

Auxins are toxic to plants in large concentrations; they are most toxic to dicots and less so to monocots. Because of this property, synthetic auxin herbicides, including 2,4-dichlorophenoxyacetic acid (2,4-D) and 2,4,5-trichlorophenoxyacetic acid (2,4,5-T), have been developed and used for weed control.

However, some exogenously synthesized auxins, especially 1-naphthaleneacetic acid (NAA) and indole-3-butyric acid (IBA), are also commonly applied to stimulate root growth when taking cuttings of plants or for different agricultural purposes such as the prevention of fruit drop in orchards.

Used in high doses, auxin stimulates the production of ethylene, also a native plant hormone. Excess ethylene can inhibit elongation growth, cause leaves to fall (abscission), and even kill the plant. Some synthetic auxins, such as 2,4-D and 2,4,5-T are marketed also as herbicides. Dicots, such as dandelions, are much more susceptible to auxins than monocots, such as grasses and cereal crops. So these synthetic auxins are valuable as synthetic herbicides. 2,4-D was the first widely used herbicide, and it is still in use. 2,4-D was first commercialized by the Sherwin-Williams company and saw use in the late 1940s. It is easy and inexpensive to manufacture.

Triclopyr (3,5,6-TPA), while known as an herbicide, has also been shown to increase the size of fruit in plants. At increased concentrations, the hormone can be lethal. Dosing down to the correct concentration has been shown to alter photosynthetic pathways. This hindrance to the plant causes a response that increases carbohydrate production, leading to larger fruit.

=== Herbicide manufacture ===
Synthetic auxins are used as a kind of herbicide and overdosing of auxins will interrupt plants' growth and lead to their death. The defoliant Agent Orange, used extensively by British forces in the Malayan Emergency and American forces in the Vietnam War, was a mix of 2,4-D and 2,4,5-T. The compound 2,4-D is still in use and is thought to be safe, but 2,4,5-T was more or less banned by the U.S. Environmental Protection Agency in 1979. The dioxin TCDD is an unavoidable contaminant produced in the manufacture of 2,4,5-T. As a result of the integral dioxin contamination, the use of 2,4,5-T products has been implicated in leukemia, miscarriages, birth defects, liver damage, and other diseases.

== See also ==
- Auxin binding protein
- Fusicoccin
- Herbicide; specifically, see the section: §Auxin
  - Phenoxy herbicide
- Pruning fruit trees
- Tropism
- Witch's broom
- Toshio Murashige
- Folke K. Skoog
- Kenneth V. Thimann
