= Homes for Heroes Act of 2013 =

- Long title: To establish the position of Special Assistant for Veterans Affairs in the Department of Housing and Urban Development, and for other purposes.
- Announced in: the 113th United States Congress
- Sponsored by: Rep. Al Green (D, TX-9)
- Number of co-sponsors: 16

Codification
- Acts affected: Cranston-Gonzalez National Affordable Housing Act, Department of Housing and Urban Development Act, McKinney-Vento Homeless Assistance Act, United States Housing Act of 1937
- U.S.C. sections affected: 42 U.S.C. § 3533, 5 U.S.C., 42 U.S.C. § 11313(c)(1), 42 U.S.C. § 1437f(o)(19), 42 U.S.C. § 1437c-1, 42 U.S.C. § 12705
- Agencies affected: United States Department of Veterans Affairs, Department of Housing and Urban Development, United States Interagency Council on Homelessness,

Legislative history
- Introduced in the House as H.R. 384 by Rep. Al Green (D-TX) on January 23, 2013; Committee consideration by United States House Committee on Financial Services

The Homes for Heroes Act of 2013 (H.R. 384) is a bill that was introduced into the United States House of Representatives in the 113th United States Congress on January 23, 2013. The bill would create a Special Assistant for Veterans Affairs in the Department of Housing and Urban Development (HUD) with responsibilities related to making sure United States military veterans get fair access to housing and homeless assistant programs.

== Background ==
A previous, similar version of this bill was introduced in the 112th United States Congress and passed the House, but failed to pass in the Senate.

== Provisions/Elements of the bill ==
This summary is based largely on the summary provided by the Congressional Research Service, a public domain source.

The Homes for Heroes Act of 2013 would amend the Department of Housing and Urban Development Act 42 U.S.C. § 3533 to establish in the Department of Housing and Urban Development (HUD) a Special Assistant for Veterans Affairs. The Special Assistant for Veterans Affairs would be responsible for ensuring veterans fair access to HUD housing and homeless assistance programs, coordinating all HUD programs and activities relating to veterans, and serving as a HUD liaison with the Department of Veterans Affairs (VA).

Finally, the Homes for Heroes Act of 2013 directs the Secretaries of HUD and VA to report annually to Congress about veteran homelessness and housing assistance.

== Procedural history ==
=== House ===
Rep. Al Green (D-TX) introduced the Homes for Heroes Act of 2013 on January 23, 2013. It was then referred to the United States House Committee on Financial Services. As of May 13, 2013, the bill has 18 co-sponsors, 16 Democrats and 2 Republicans.

The House Majority Leader Eric Cantor announced on Friday May 10, 2013 that H.R. 1580 would be considered the following week.

== See also ==
- Department of Housing and Urban Development (HUD)
- Department of Veterans Affairs (VA)
- Homeless veterans in the United States
