= 1-Naphthaleneacetic acid =

- 1-Naphthaleneacetic acid

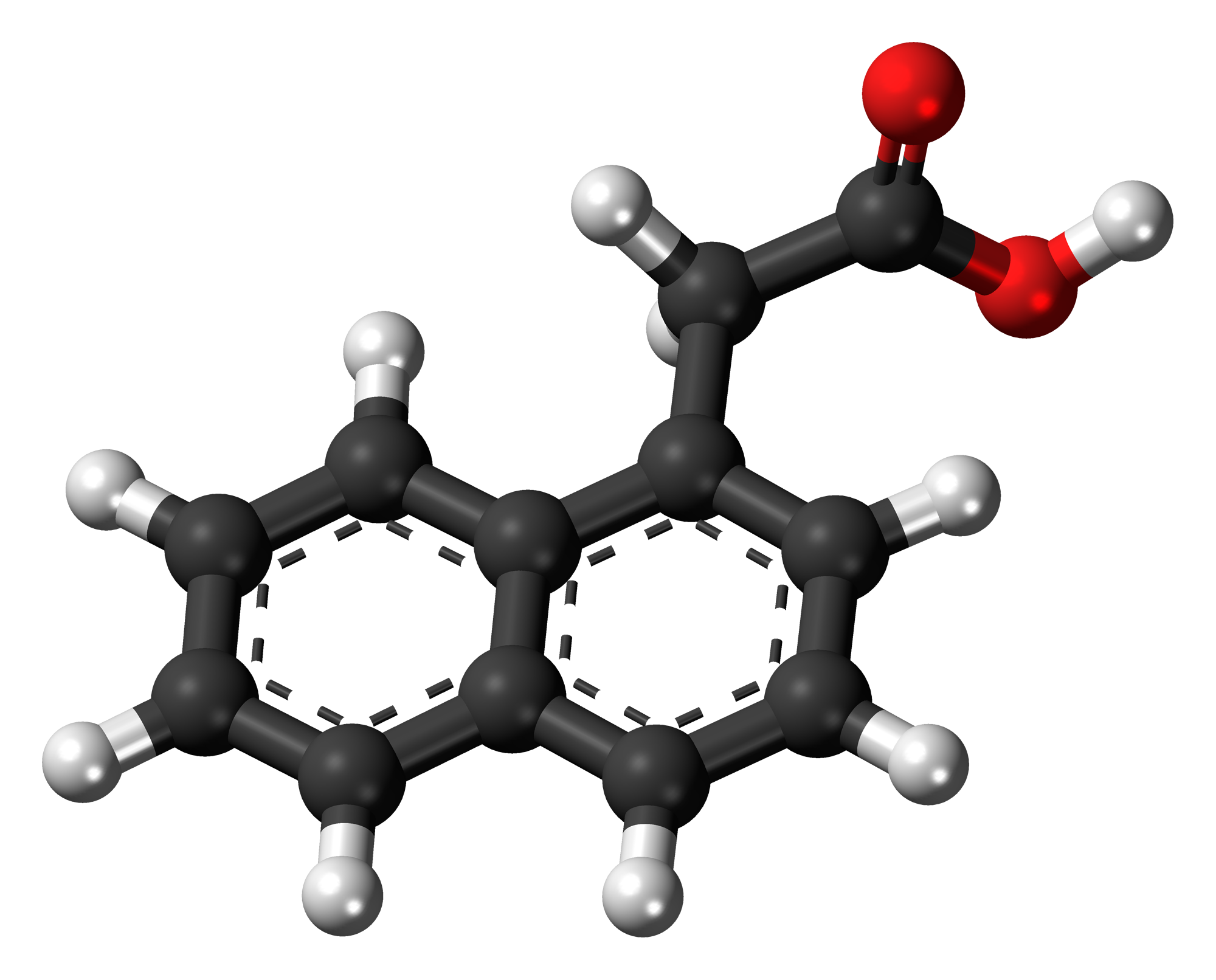

Names
- Preferred IUPAC name (Naphthalen-1-yl)acetic acid
- Other names 1-Naphthaleneacetic acid α-Naphthaleneacetic acid Naphthylacetic acid NAA; 2-(1-Naphthyl)acetic acid

Identifiers
CAS Number	86-87-3
3D model (JSmol)	Interactive image
ChEBI	CHEBI:32918
ChEMBL	ChEMBL428495
ChemSpider	6601
DrugBank	DB01750
ECHA InfoCard	100.001.551
KEGG	D01558
PubChem CID	6862
UNII	33T7G7757C
CompTox Dashboard (EPA)	DTXSID8020915
- InChI: InChI=1S/C12H10O2/c13-12(14)8-10-6-3-5-9-4-1-2-7-11(9)10/h1-7H,8H2,(H,13,14) Key: PRPINYUDVPFIRX-UHFFFAOYSA-N; InChI=1/C12H10O2/c13-12(14)8-10-6-3-5-9-4-1-2-7-11(9)10/h1-7H,8H2,(H,13,14) Key: PRPINYUDVPFIRX-UHFFFAOYAF
- SMILES: O=C(O)Cc2cccc1ccccc12

Properties
Chemical formula	C_{12}H_{10}O_{2}
Molar mass	186.210 g·mol^{−1}
Appearance	White powder
Melting point	135 °C (275 °F)
Solubility in water	0.42 g/L (20 °C)
Acidity (pK_{a})	4.24

Hazards
Safety data sheet (SDS)	SIRI.org sciencelab.com

Related compounds
Related Auxins	Indole-3-acetic acid
- Except where otherwise noted, data are given for materials in their standard state (at 25 °C [77 °F], 100 kPa). verify (what is ?) Infobox references

1-Naphthaleneacetic acid (NAA) is an organic compound with the formula C_{10}H_{7}CH_{2}CO_{2}H. This colorless solid is soluble in organic solvents. It features a carboxylmethyl group (CH_{2}CO_{2}H) linked to the "1-position" of naphthalene.

== Use and regulation ==
NAA is a synthetic plant hormone in the auxin family and is an ingredient in many commercial horticultural products; it is a rooting agent and used for the vegetative propagation of plants from stem and leaf cuttings. It is also used for plant tissue culture.

The hormone NAA does not occur naturally, and, like all auxins, is toxic to plants at high concentrations. In the United States, under the Federal Insecticide, Fungicide, and Rodenticide Act (FIFRA), products containing NAA require registration with the Environmental Protection Agency (EPA) as pesticides.

== Use and analysis ==
NAA is widely used in agriculture for various purposes. It is considered to be only slightly toxic but when at higher concentrations it can be toxic to animals. This was shown when tested on rats via oral ingestion at 1000–5900 mg/kg. NAA has been shown to greatly increase cellulose fiber formation in plants when paired with another phytohormone called gibberellic acid. Because it is in the auxin family it has also been understood to prevent premature dropping and thinning of fruits from stems. It is applied after blossom fertilization. Increased amounts can actually have negative effects however, and cause growth inhibition to the development of plant crops. It has been used on many different crops including apples, olives, oranges, potatoes, and various other hanging fruits. In order for it to obtain its desired effects it must be applied in concentrations ranging from 20–100 μg/mL. NAA present in the environment undergoes oxidation reactions with hydroxyl radicals and sulfate radicals. Radical reactions of NAA were studied using pulse radiolysis technique. Hydroxyl adduct radical was formed as the intermediate during the reaction of hydroxyl radical with NAA. The intermediate naphthyl methyl radical was formed during the reaction of sulfate radical anion with NAA.

In micropropagation of various plants, NAA is typically added to a medium containing nutrients essential to the plants' survival. It is added to help induce root formation in various plant types. It can also be applied by spraying it onto plants and which is typical in agricultural use. It is prohibited in many areas to use it in high concentrations due to the health concerns towards humans and other animals.

NAA can be detected by HPLC-tandem mass spectrometry (HPLC-MS/MS).

== See also ==
- 1-Naphthaleneacetamide
- Micropropagation
- Tissue culture
- Indole-3-butyric acid - Another chemical used as a plant rooting agent.
