= Mitochonic acid 5 =

Clinical data
- Other names: MA-5

Legal status
- Legal status: Investigational

Identifiers
- IUPAC name: 4-(2,4-Difluorophenyl)-2-(1H-indol-3-yl)-4-oxobutanoic acid
- CAS Number: 1354707-41-7
- PubChem CID: 76070959
- ChemSpider: 67896567
- ChEBI: CHEBI:234581

Chemical and physical data
- Formula: C_{18}H_{13}F_{2}NO_{3}
- Molar mass: 329.303 g·mol^{−1}
- 3D model (JSmol): Interactive image
- SMILES: C1=CC=C2C(=C1)C(=CN2)C(CC(=O)C3=C(C=C(C=C3)F)F)C(=O)O
- InChI: InChI=InChI=1S/C18H13F2NO3/c19-10-5-6-12(15(20)7-10)17(22)8-13(18(23)24)14-9-21-16-4-2-1-3-11(14)16/h1-7,9,13,21H,8H2,(H,23,24); Key:BOKQALWNGNLTOC-UHFFFAOYSA-N

Mitochonic acid 5 (also known as MA-5) is a chemical compound derived from the plant hormone indole-3-acetic acid (IAA). It is under investigation for its ability to enhance mitochondrial function and ATP production, with potential therapeutic applications in mitochondrial diseases and related conditions.

MA-5 was identified by researchers at Tohoku University through screening of a chemical library of indole-3-acetic acid analogs. The compound was selected for its ability to increase cellular ATP levels in Hep3B human hepatocellular carcinoma cells. MA-5 is a mitochondria-homing compound that binds to the mitochondrial protein mitofilin (also known as Mic60), a component of the mitochondrial inner membrane organizing system (MINOS). This interaction facilitates ATP synthase oligomerization and supercomplex formation, leading to enhanced local ATP production, even under conditions where the electron transport chain is impaired. It also reduces mitochondrial reactive oxygen species production, maintains mitochondrial membrane potential, and promotes protective mitophagy in various stress conditions, independent of direct antioxidant effects.

MA-5 was first shown to improve the survival of fibroblasts from patients with various mitochondrial diseases (including Leigh syndrome, MELAS syndrome, Leber's hereditary optic neuropathy, and Kearns–Sayre syndrome) under oxidative stress conditions. Subsequent studies demonstrated that MA-5 binds mitochondria, ameliorates damage in renal tubular cells and cardiac myocytes, protects against ischemia-reperfusion injury in kidney models, and extends lifespan in a mitochondrial disease mouse model. Further preclinical research has explored its effects in models of age-related neuromuscular dysfunction, Duchenne muscular dystrophy, Parkinson's disease, age-related hearing loss, alcohol-induced cardiomyopathy, peritoneal fibrosis, and neuroinflammation, where it attenuates mitochondrial Ca^{2+} overload, improves motor performance, reduces neuronal degeneration, and supports mitochondrial respiration.
