= 2,4-DB =

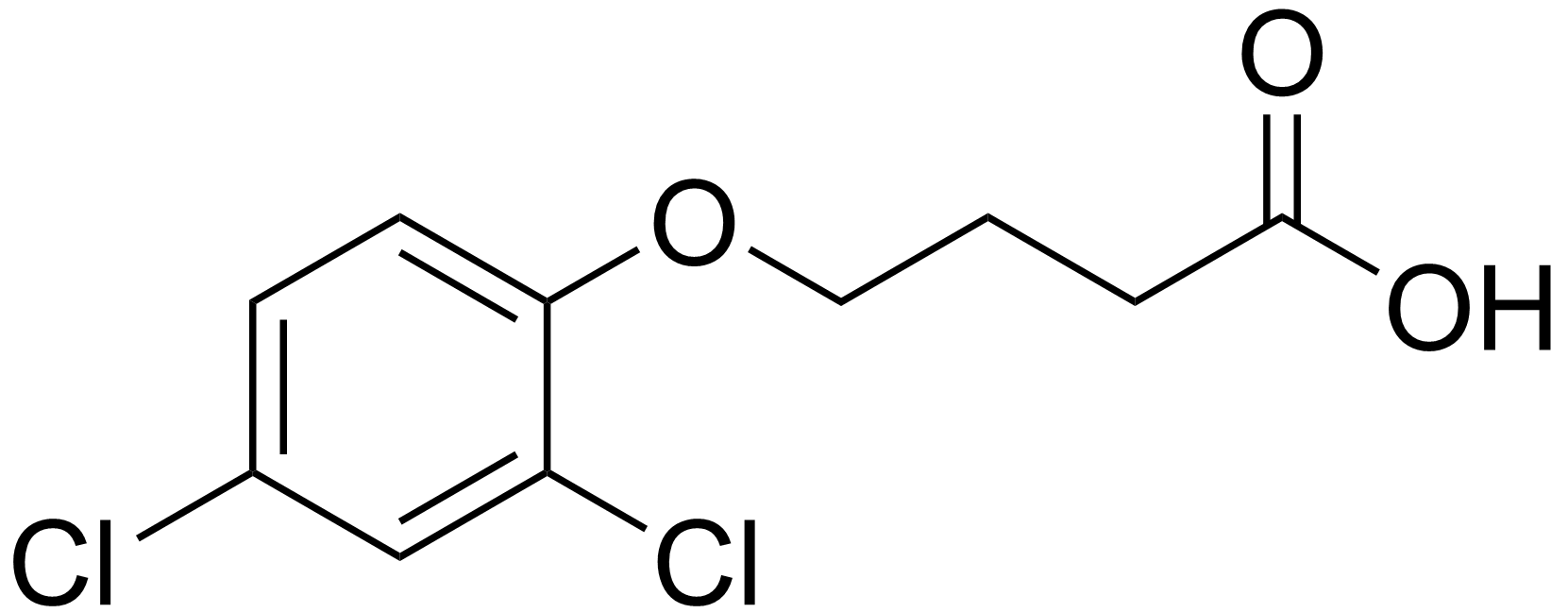

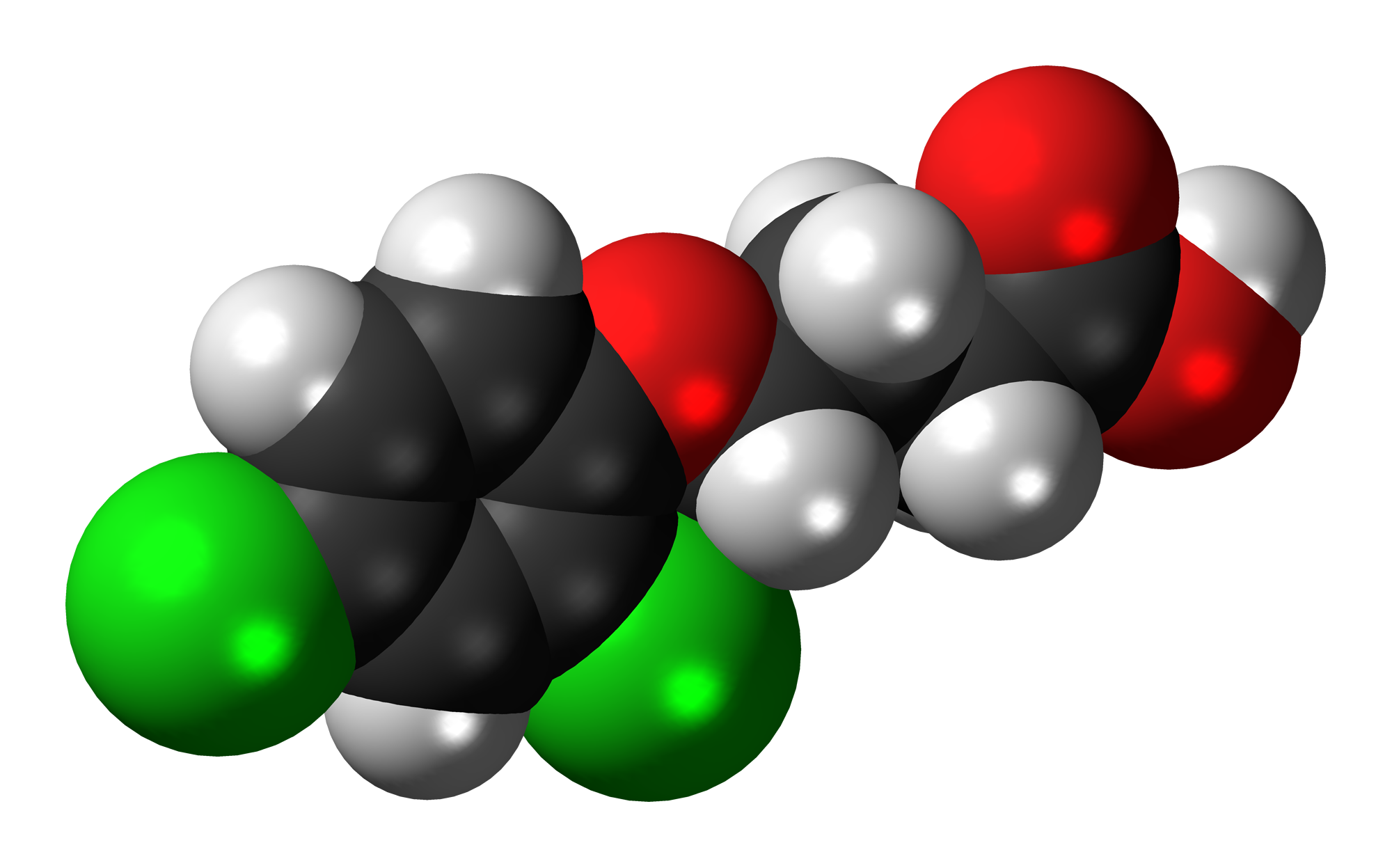

Names
- Preferred IUPAC name 4-(2,4-Dichlorophenoxy)butanoic acid
- Other names: (2,4-Dichlorophenoxy)butyric acid; Butirex; Butyrac; Embutone; Embutox; Venceweed

Identifiers
CAS Number	94-82-6
3D model (JSmol)	Interactive image
Beilstein Reference	1976809
ChEBI	CHEBI:73173
ChemSpider	1444
ECHA InfoCard	100.002.152
KEGG	C14404
PubChem CID	1489
RTECS number	ES9100000
UNII	SL314DW868
UN number	3082
CompTox Dashboard (EPA)	DTXSID7024035
- InChI: InChI=1S/C10H10Cl2O3/c11-7-3-4-9(8(12)6-7)15-5-1-2-10(13)14/h3-4,6H,1-2,5H2,(H,13,14) Key: YIVXMZJTEQBPQO-UHFFFAOYSA-N; InChI=1/C10H10Cl2O3/c11-7-3-4-9(8(12)6-7)15-5-1-2-10(13)14/h3-4,6H,1-2,5H2,(H,13,14) Key: YIVXMZJTEQBPQO-UHFFFAOYAK
- SMILES: Clc1cc(Cl)ccc1OCCCC(=O)O

Properties
Chemical formula	C_{10}H_{10}Cl_{2}O_{3}
Molar mass	249.09 g/mol
Appearance	Colorless to white crystal
Melting point	117 to 119 °C (243 to 246 °F; 390 to 392 K)
Solubility in water	46 mg/L

Hazards
- Occupational safety and health (OHS/OSH)
Main hazards	Persistent hazard to marine life.
- GHS labelling
Pictograms	(GHS07: Exclamation mark) (GHS05: Corrosive)
Signal word	Warning
Hazard statements	H302, H411
Precautionary statements	P264, P270, P273, P301+P312, P330, P391, P501
NFPA 704 (fire diamond)	0 0 0
- Lethal dose or concentration (LD, LC)
LC_{50} (median concentration)	1.97 mg/L - 96.0 h (Rainbow Trout)
Safety data sheet (SDS)	Sigma-Aldrich Site
- Except where otherwise noted, data are given for materials in their standard state (at 25 °C [77 °F], 100 kPa). verify (what is ?) Infobox references

2,4-DB or 4-(2,4-dichlorophenoxy)butyric acid is a selective systemic phenoxy herbicide used to control many annual and perennial broad-leaf weeds in alfalfa, peanuts, soybeans, and other crops. Its active metabolite, 2,4-D, inhibits growth at the tips of stems and roots. It is classified in toxicity class III. It shows some evidence of toxicity to dogs and cats, such as changes in body weight and reduced numbers of offspring, when fed 25-80 milligrams per kilogram of body weight for prolonged periods. Tests of carcinogenicity in this range yielded differing results. It is moderately toxic to fish.
