= MCPB =

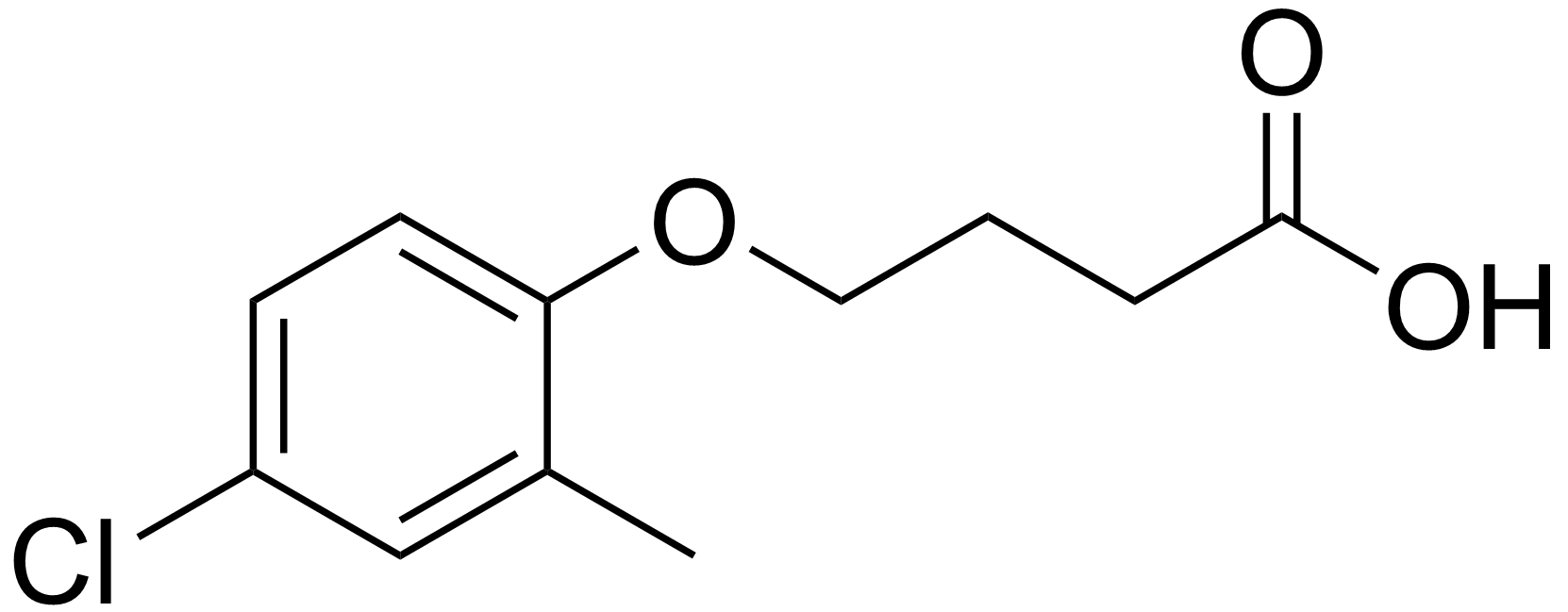

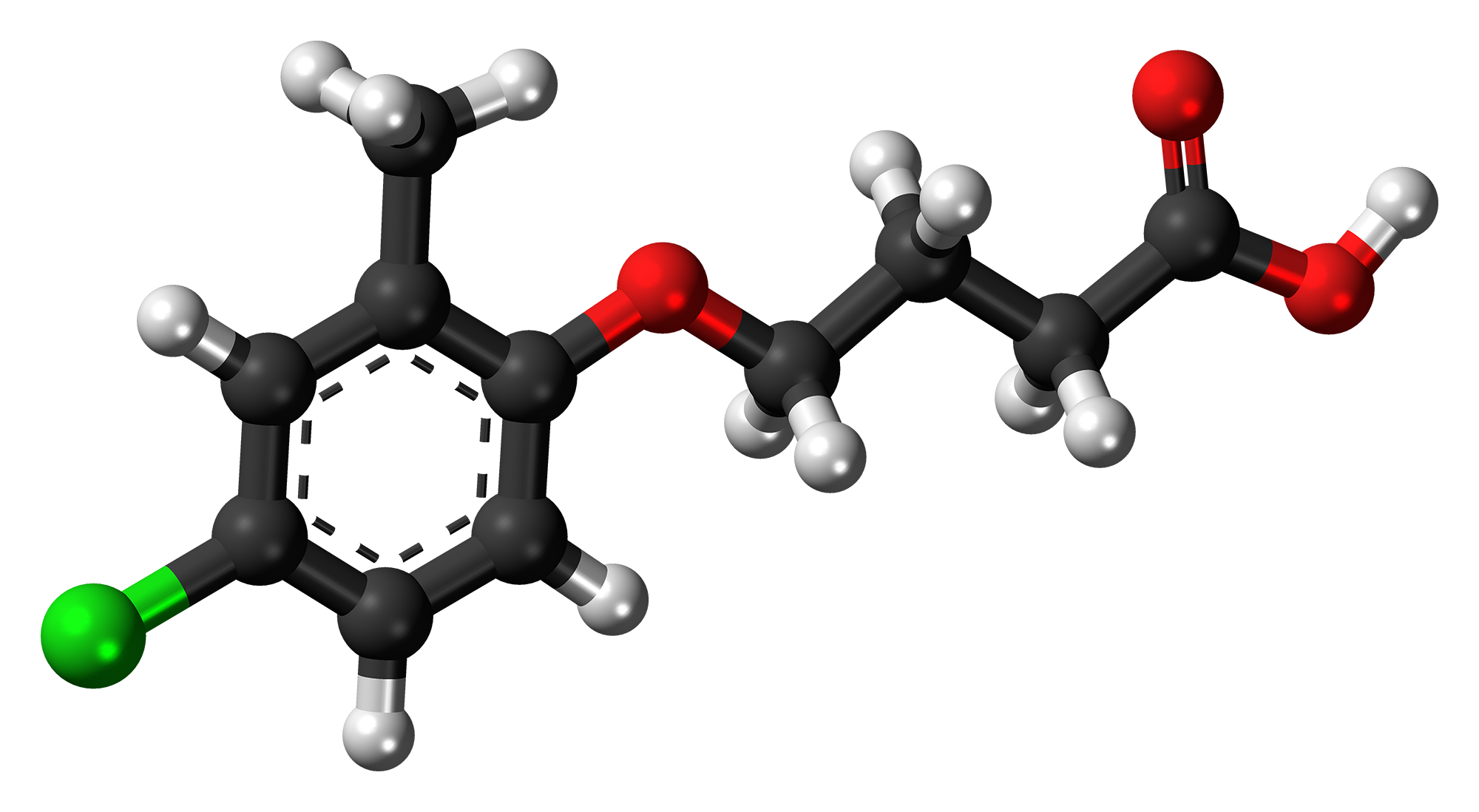

Names
- Preferred IUPAC name 4-(4-Chloro-2-methylphenoxy)butanoic acid

Identifiers
CAS Number	94-81-5
3D model (JSmol)	Interactive image
ChemSpider	6938
ECHA InfoCard	100.002.151
PubChem CID	7207
UNII	OA1Z4N1842
CompTox Dashboard (EPA)	DTXSID4024193
- InChI: InChI=1S/C11H13ClO3/c1-8-7-9(12)4-5-10(8)15-6-2-3-11(13)14/h4-5,7H,2-3,6H2,1H3,(H,13,14) Key: LLWADFLAOKUBDR-UHFFFAOYSA-N; InChI=1/C11H13ClO3/c1-8-7-9(12)4-5-10(8)15-6-2-3-11(13)14/h4-5,7H,2-3,6H2,1H3,(H,13,14) Key: LLWADFLAOKUBDR-UHFFFAOYAB
- SMILES: CC1=C(C=CC(=C1)Cl)OCCCC(=O)O

Properties
Chemical formula	C_{11}H_{13}ClO_{3}
Molar mass	228.67 g/mol
Appearance	colourless crystalline solid

Hazards
- Lethal dose or concentration (LD, LC)
LD_{50} (median dose)	680 mg/kg (rat, oral)
- Except where otherwise noted, data are given for materials in their standard state (at 25 °C [77 °F], 100 kPa). verify (what is ?) Infobox references

MCPB, 2,4-MCPB, 4-(4-chloro-o-tolyloxy)butyric acid (IUPAC), or 4-(4-chloro-2-methylphenoxy)butanoic acid (CAS) is a selective phenoxybutyric herbicide. In the United States it is registered for use on pea crops before flowering, for post-emergence control of broadleaf annual and perennial weeds including Canadian thistle, buttercup, mustard, purslane, ragweed, common lambsquarters, pigweed, smartweed, sowthistle, and morning glory. It has low to moderate acute toxicity, with kidney and liver effects as the main hazard concerns.

It is registered in Australia, Canada, Hungary, New Zealand, the UK and the USA. It is not volatile, persistent, or likely to bioconcentrate.

MCPB has to be oxidised into MCPA to have effect; because of this, it is more selective and can be sprayed on more sensitive crops than MCPA.

A variety of methods have been developed for its analysis. In the U.S., the maximum residue permitted on peas is 0.1 parts per million.

It is synthesised by chlorinating o-cresol and coupling it with γ-chlorobutyric acid.
