= Indole-3-acetic acid =

Names
- Preferred IUPAC name (1H-Indol-3-yl)acetic acid
- Other names Indole-3-acetic acid, indolylacetic acid, 1H-Indole-3-acetic acid, indoleacetic acid, heteroauxin, IAA

Identifiers
CAS Number	87-51-4
3D model (JSmol)	Interactive image
ChEBI	CHEBI:16411
ChEMBL	ChEMBL82411
ChemSpider	780
DrugBank	DB07950
ECHA InfoCard	100.001.590
EC Number	201-748-2
Gmelin Reference	143197
KEGG	C00954
PubChem CID	802
UNII	6U1S09C61L
CompTox Dashboard (EPA)	DTXSID5020738
- InChI: InChI=1S/C10H9NO2/c12-10(13)5-7-6-11-9-4-2-1-3-8(7)9/h1-4,6,11H,5H2,(H,12,13) Key: SEOVTRFCIGRIMH-UHFFFAOYSA-N; InChI=1/C10H9NO2/c12-10(13)5-7-6-11-9-4-2-1-3-8(7)9/h1-4,6,11H,5H2,(H,12,13) Key: SEOVTRFCIGRIMH-UHFFFAOYAT
- SMILES: O=C(O)Cc1c[nH]c2ccccc12

Properties
Chemical formula	C_{10}H_{9}NO_{2}
Molar mass	175.187 g·mol^{−1}
Appearance	White solid
Melting point	168 to 170 °C (334 to 338 °F; 441 to 443 K)
Solubility in water	insoluble in water. Soluble in ethanol to 50mg/mL
- Except where otherwise noted, data are given for materials in their standard state (at 25 °C [77 °F], 100 kPa). verify (what is ?) Infobox references

Indole-3-acetic acid (IAA, 3-IAA) is the most common naturally occurring plant hormone of the auxin class. It is the best known of the auxins, and has been the subject of extensive studies by plant physiologists. IAA is a derivative of indole, containing a carboxymethyl substituent. It is a colorless solid that is soluble in polar organic solvents.

== Biosynthesis ==
IAA is predominantly produced in cells of the apex (bud) and very young leaves of a plant. Plants can synthesize IAA by several independent biosynthetic pathways. Four of them start from tryptophan, but there is also a biosynthetic pathway independent of tryptophan. Plants mainly produce IAA from tryptophan through indole-3-pyruvic acid. IAA is also produced from tryptophan through indole-3-acetaldoxime in Arabidopsis thaliana.

In rats, IAA is a product of both endogenous and colonic microbial metabolism from dietary tryptophan along with tryptophol. This was first observed in rats infected by Trypanosoma brucei gambiense. A 2015 experiment showed that a high-tryptophan diet can decrease serum levels of IAA in mice, but that in humans, protein consumption has no reliably predictable effect on plasma IAA levels. Human cells have been known to produce IAA in vitro since the 1950s, and the critical biosynthesis gene IL4I1 has been identified.

== Biological effects ==
As all auxins, IAA has many different effects, such as inducing cell elongation and cell division with all subsequent results for plant growth and development. On a larger scale, IAA serves as signaling molecule necessary for development of plant organs and coordination of growth.

=== Plant gene regulation ===
IAA enters the plant cell nucleus and binds to a protein complex composed of a ubiquitin-activating enzyme (E1), a ubiquitin-conjugating enzyme (E2), and a ubiquitin ligase (E3), resulting in ubiquitination of Aux/IAA proteins with increased speed. Aux/IAA proteins bind to auxin response factor (ARF) proteins, forming a heterodimer, suppressing ARF activity. In 1997 it was described how ARFs bind to auxin-response gene elements in promoters of auxin regulated genes, generally activating transcription of that gene when an Aux/IAA protein is not bound.

IAA inhibits the photorespiratory-dependent cell death in photorespiratory catalase mutants. This suggests a role for auxin signalling in stress tolerance.

=== Bacterial physiology ===
IAA production is widespread among environmental bacteria that inhabit soils, waters, but also plant and animal hosts. Distribution and substrate specificity of the involved enzymes suggests these pathways play a role beyond plant-microbe interactions. Enterobacter cloacae can produce IAA, from aromatic and branched-chain amino acids.

=== Fungal symbiosis ===
Fungi can form a fungal mantle around roots of perennial plants called ectomycorrhiza. A fungus specific to spruce called Tricholoma vaccinum was shown to produce IAA from tryptophan and excrete it from its hyphae. This induced branching in cultures, and enhanced Hartig net formation. The fungus uses a multidrug and toxic extrusion (MATE) transporter Mte1. Research into IAA-producing fungi to promote plant growth and protection in sustainable agriculture is underway.

=== Skatole biosynthesis ===
Skatole, the odorant in feces, is produced from tryptophan via indoleacetic acid. Decarboxylation gives the methylindole.

== Synthesis ==
Chemically, it can be synthesized by the reaction of indole with glycolic acid in the presence of base at 250 °C:

Alternatively the compound has been synthesized by Fischer indole synthesis using glutamic acid and phenylhydrazine. Glutamic acid was converted to the necessary aldehyde via Strecker degradation.

Many methods for its synthesis have been developed since its original synthesis from indole-3-acetonitrile.

== History and synthetic analogs ==
William Gladstone Tempelman studied substances for growth promotion at Imperial Chemical Industries Ltd. After 7 years of research he changed the direction of his study to try the same substances at high concentrations in order to stop plant growth. In 1940, he published his finding that IAA killed broadleaf plants within a cereal field.

The search for an acid with a longer half life, i.e. a metabolically and environmentally more stable compound led to 2,4-dichlorophenoxyacetic acid (2,4-D) and 2,4,5-trichlorophenoxyacetic acid (2,4,5-T), both phenoxy herbicides and analogs of IAA. Robert Pokorny an industrial chemist for the C.B. Dolge Company in Westport, Connecticut published their synthesis in 1941. When sprayed on broad-leaf dicot plants, they induce rapid, uncontrolled growth, eventually killing them. First introduced in 1946, these herbicides were in widespread use in agriculture by the middle of the 1950s.

Other less expensive synthetic auxin analogs on the market for use in horticulture are indole-3-butyric acid (IBA) and 1-naphthaleneacetic acid (NAA).

== Mammalian toxicity/health effects ==
Little research has been conducted on the effects of IAA on humans and toxicity data are limited. No data on human carcinogenic, teratogenic, or developmental effects have been created.

IAA is listed in its MSDS as mutagenic to mammalian somatic cells, and possibly carcinogenic based on animal data. It may cause adverse reproductive effects (fetotoxicity) and birth defects based on animal data. It is listed as a potential skin, eye, and respiratory irritant, and users are warned not to ingest it. Protocols for ingestion, inhalation, and skin/eye exposure are standard for moderately poisonous compounds and include thorough rinsing in the case of skin and eyes, fresh air in the case of inhalation, and immediately contacting a physician in all cases to determine the best course of action and not to induce vomiting when of ingested. IAA is a direct ligand of the aryl hydrocarbon receptor, and IAA treatment of mice indicate liver-protective effects in a model of non-alcoholic fatty liver disease. Humans typically have relatively high levels of IAA in their serum (~1 μM), but this can be increased further in certain disease conditions and can be a poor prognostic marker for cardiovascular health. Whether this IAA originates from endogenous biosynthesis via IL4I1 or gut microbiota is unknown. A 2021 study found that normal mice had an average of 3.7 times as much IAA in their feces compared to germ-free mice, suggesting that the mammalian microbiome contributes significantly to the overall circulating amount.

=== Developmental toxicity ===
IAA produces microcephaly in rats during the early stage of cerebral cortex development. IAA treatment of pregnant rats, at a dose of 1 gram per kg of body weight per day, decreased the locomotor activities of rat embryos/fetuses; treatment with IAA and analog 1(methyl)-IAA resulted in apoptosis of neuroepithelial cell and significantly decreased brain sizes relative to body weight in embryonic rats.

=== Immunotoxin ===
IAA is an apoptosis-inducing ligand in mammals. As of 2010, the signal transduction pathways are as follows: IAA/HRP activates p38 mitogen-activated protein kinases and c-Jun N-terminal kinases. It induces caspase-8 and caspase-9, which results in caspase-3 activation and poly(adp-ribose) polymerases cleavage.

In 2002, it had been hypothesized that IAA coupled with horseradish peroxidase (HRP) could be used in targeted cancer therapy. Radical-IAA molecules would attach to cells marked by HRP and HRP reactive cells would be selectively killed. In 2010 in vitro experiments proved this concept of IAA as an immunotoxin when used in preclinical studies of targeted cancer therapy, as it induced apoptosis in bladder and in hematological malignancies.

== See also ==
- Mitochonic acid 5
