= Somatic embryogenesis =

Method to derive a plant or embryo from a single somatic cell

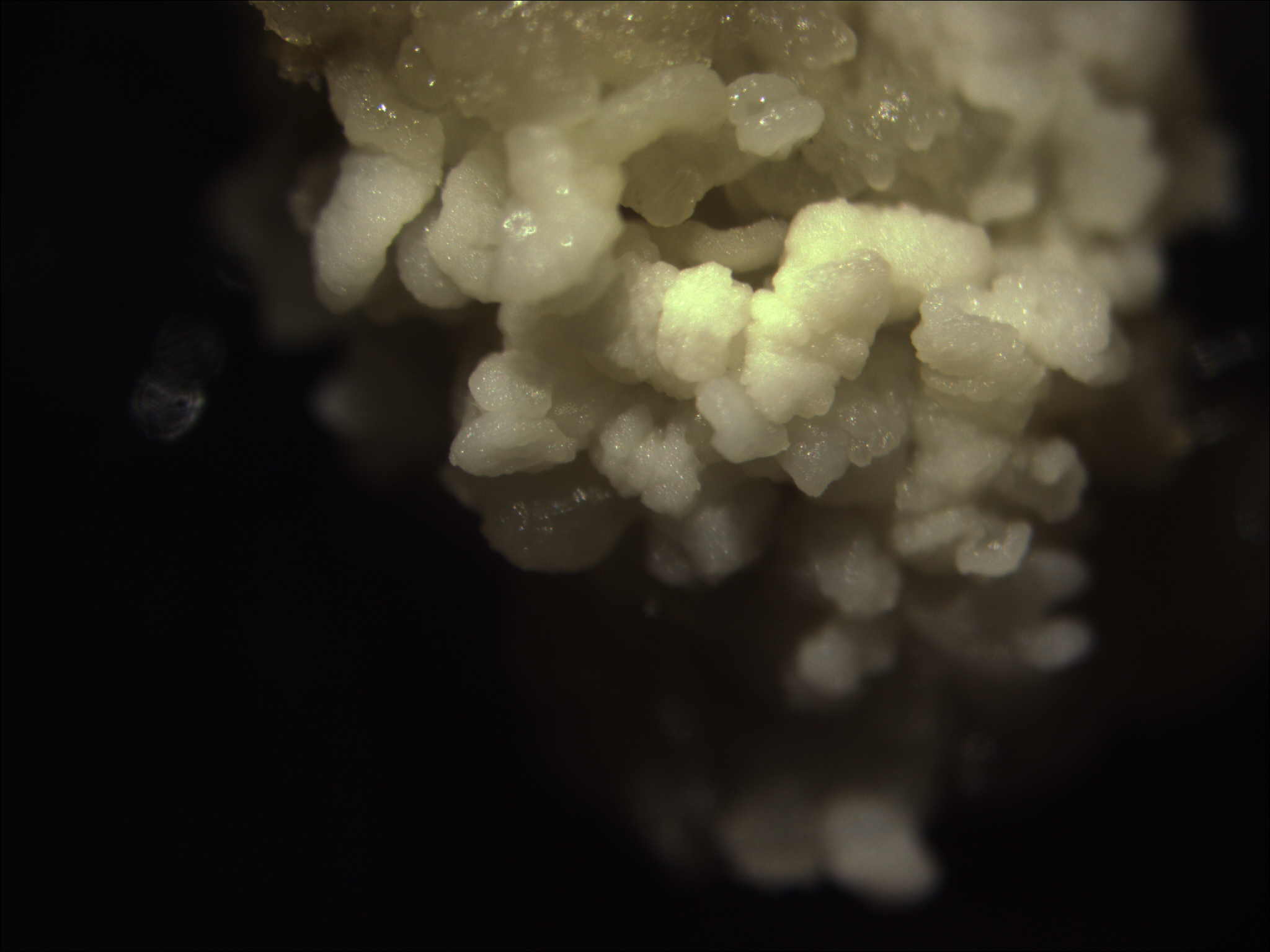
Switchgrass somatic embryos

Somatic embryogenesis is an artificial process in which a plant embryo is derived from a single somatic cell. Somatic embryos are formed from plant cells that are not normally involved in the development of embryos, i.e. ordinary plant tissue. No endosperm or seed coat is formed around a somatic embryo.

Cells derived from competent source tissue are cultured to form an undifferentiated mass of cells called a callus. Plant growth regulators (PGRs) in the tissue culture medium can be manipulated to induce callus formation and subsequently changed to induce embryos to form the callus. The ratio of different plant growth regulators required to induce callus or embryo formation varies with the type of plant. Somatic embryos are mainly produced in vitro for laboratory research, using either solid or liquid nutrient media containing plant growth regulators. The main PGRs used are auxins but cytokinins may also be present in smaller amounts. Shoots and roots are monopolar while somatic embryos are bipolar, allowing them to form a whole plant without culturing on multiple media types. Somatic embryogenesis has served as a model of the physiological and biochemical events that occur during plant developmental processes and has also played a role in biotechnological advancement. The first documentation of somatic embryogenesis was by Steward et al. in 1958 and Reinert in 1959 with carrot cell suspension cultures.

== Direct and indirect embryogenesis ==
Somatic embryogenesis has been described to occur in two ways: directly and indirectly. Direct embryogenesis occurs when embryos are started directly from explant tissue without the formation of callus from the explant, creating an identical clone.

Indirect embryogenesis occurs when explants produce undifferentiated or partially differentiated cells (often referred to as callus) which then is maintained or differentiated into mature plant tissues such as leaf, stem, or roots. 2,4-Dichlorophenoxyacetic acid (2,4-D), 6-Benzylaminopurine (BAP) and Gibberellic acid (GA) has been used for development of indirect somatic embryos in strawberry (Fragaria ananassa)

== Plant regeneration by somatic embryogenesis ==
Plant regeneration via somatic embryogenesis occurs in five steps: initiation of embryogenic cultures, proliferation of embryogenic cultures, prematuration of somatic embryos, maturation of somatic embryos and plant development on nonspecific media. Initiation and proliferation occur on a medium rich in auxins, which induces differentiation of localized meristematic cells. The auxin typically used is 2,4-D. Once transferred to a medium with low or no auxin, these cells can then develop into mature embryos. Germination of the somatic embryo can only occur when it is mature enough to have functional root and shoot apices.

== Factors influencing ==
Factors and mechanisms controlling cell differentiation in somatic embryos are relatively ambiguous. Certain compounds excreted by plant tissue cultures and found in culture media have been shown necessary to coordinate cell division and morphological changes. These compounds have been identified by Chung et al. as various polysaccharides, amino acids, growth regulators, vitamins, low molecular weight compounds and polypeptides. Several signaling molecules known to influence or control the formation of somatic embryos have been found and include extracellular proteins, arabinogalactan proteins and lipochitooligosaccharides. Temperature and lighting can also affect the maturation of the somatic embryo.

== Applications ==
Applications of this process include: clonal propagation of genetically uniform plant material; elimination of viruses; provision of source tissue for genetic transformation; generation of whole plants from single cells called protoplasts; development of synthetic seed technology.

== Uses of somatic embryogenesis ==
- Plant transformations
- Mass propagation

=== Forestry related example ===
The development of somatic embryogenesis procedures has given rise to research on seed storage proteins (SSPs) of woody plants for tree species of commercial importance, i.e., mainly gymnosperms, including white spruce. In this area of study, SSPs are used as markers to determine the embryogenic potential and competency of the embryogenic system to produce a somatic embryo biochemically similar to its zygotic counterpart (Flinn et al. 1991, Beardmore et al. 1997).

Grossnickle et al. (1992) compared interior spruce seedlings with emblings during nursery development and through a stock quality assessment program immediately before field outplanting. Seedling shoot height, root collar diameter, and dry weight increased at a greater rate in seedlings than in emblings during the first half of the first growing season, but thereafter shoot growth was similar among all plants. By the end of the growing season, seedlings were 70% taller than emblings, had greater root collar diameter, and greater shoot dry weight. Root dry weight increased more rapidly in seedlings than in emblings during the early growing season

During fall acclimation, the pattern of increasing dormancy release index and increasing tolerance to freezing was similar in both seedlings and emblings. Root growth capacity decreased then increased during fall acclimation, with the increase being greater in seedlings.

Assessment of stock quality just prior to planting showed that: emblings had greater water use efficiency with decreasing predawn shoot water potential compared with seedlings; seedlings and emblings had similar water movement capability at both high and low root temperatures; net photosynthesis and needle conductance at low root temperatures were greater in seedlings than in emblings; and seedlings had greater root growth than emblings at 22 °C root, but root growth among all plants was low at 7.5 °C root temperature.

Growth and survival of interior spruce 313B Styroblock seedlings and emblings after outplanting on a reforestation site were determined by Grossnickle and Major (1992). For both seedlings and emblings, osmotic potential at saturation (ψ_{sat}) and turgor loss point (ψ_{tip}) increased from a low of -1.82 and -2.22 MPa, respectively, just prior to planting to a seasonal high of -1.09 and -1.21 MPa, respectively, during active shoot elongation. Thereafter, seedlings and emblings (ψ_{sat}) and (ψ_{tip}) declined to -2.00 and -2.45 MPa, respectively, at the end of the growing season, which coincided with the steady decline in site temperatures and a cessation of height growth. In general, seedlings and emblings had similar ψ_{sat} and ψ_{tip} values through the growing season, and also had similar shifts in seasonal patterns of maximum modulus of elasticity, sympalstic fraction, and relative water content at turgor loss point.

Grossnickle and Major (1992) found that year-old and current-year needles of both seedlings and emblings had a similar decline in needle conductance with increasing vapour pressure deficit. Response surface models of current-year needles net photosynthesis (P_{n}) response to vapour pressure deficit (VPD) and photosynthetically active radiation (PAR) showed that emblings had 15% greater P_{n} at VPD of less than 3.0 kPa and PAR greater than 1000 μmol m^{−2}s^{−1}. Year-old and current-year needles of seedlings and emblings showed similar patterns of water use efficiency.

Rates of shoot growth in seedlings and emblings through the growing season were also similar to one another. Seedlings had larger shoot systems both at the time of planting and at the end of the growing season. Seedlings also had greater root development than emblings through the growing season, but root:shoot ratios for the 2 stock types were similar at the end of the growing season, when the survival rates for seedlings and emblings were 96% and 99%, respectively.

== Tracking and fate maps ==
Understanding the formation of a somatic embryo through establishment of morphological and molecular markers is important for construction of a fate map. The fate map is the foundation in which to build further research and experimentation. Two methods exist to construct a fate map: synchronous cell-division and time-lapse tracking. The latter typically works more consistently because of cell-cycle-altering chemicals and centrifuging involved in synchronous cell-division.

== Angiosperms ==
Embryo development in angiosperms is divided into several steps. The zygote is divided asymmetrically forming a small apical cell and large basal cell. The organizational pattern is formed in the globular stage and the embryo then transitions to the cotyledonary stage. Embryo development differs in monocots and dicots. Dicots pass through the globular, heart-shaped, and torpedo stages while monocots pass through globular, scutellar, and coleoptilar stages.

Many culture systems induce and maintain somatic embryogenesis by continuous exposure to 2,4-dichlorophenoxyacetic acid. Abscisic acid has been reported to induce somatic embryogenesis in seedlings. After callus formation, culturing on a low auxin or hormone free media will promote somatic embryo growth and root formation. In monocots, embryogenic capability is usually restricted to tissues with embryogenic or meristematic origin. Somatic cells of monocots differentiate quickly and then lose mitotic and morphogenic capability. Differences of auxin sensitivity in embryogenic callus growth between different genotypes of the same species show how variable auxin responses can be.

Carrot Daucus carota was the first and most understood species with regard to developmental pathways and molecular mechanisms. Time-lapse tracking by Toonen et al. (1994) showed that morphology of competent cells can vary based on shape and cytoplasm density. Five types of cells were identified from embryonic suspension: spherical cytoplasm-rich, spherical vacuolated, oval vacuolated, elongated vacuolated, and irregular shaped cells. Each type of cell multiplied with certain geometric symmetry. They developed into symmetrical, asymmetrical, and aberrantly-shaped cell clusters that eventually formed embryos at different frequencies. This indicates that organized growth polarity do not always exist in somatic embryogenesis.

== Gymnosperms ==
Embryo development in gymnosperms occurs in three phases. Proembryogeny includes all stages prior to suspensor elongation. Early embryogeny includes all stages after suspensor elongation but before root meristem development. Late embryogeny includes development of root and shoot meristems. Time-lapse tracking in Norway Spruce Picea abies revealed that neither single cytoplasmic-rich cells nor vacuolated cells developed into embryos. Proembryogenic masses (PEMs), an intermediate between unorganized cells and an embryo composed of cytoplasmic-rich cells next to a vacuolated cell, are stimulated with auxin and cytokinin. Gradual removal of auxin and cytokinin and introduction of abscisic acid (ABA) will allow an embryo to form. Using somatic embryogenesis has been considered for mass production of vegetatively propagated conifer clones and cryopreservation of germplasm. However, the use of this technology for reforestation and tree breeding of conifers is in its infancy.

== See also ==
- Plant embryogenesis
- Callus (cell biology)
- Plant tissue culture
- Plant hormone
- Embryo Rescue
- Hyperhydricity
- Murashige and Skoog medium
