= Adenylate dimethylallyltransferase =

Enzyme

Identifiers
- EC no.: 2.5.1.27
- CAS no.: 72840-95-0

Databases
- IntEnz: IntEnz view
- BRENDA: BRENDA entry
- ExPASy: NiceZyme view
- KEGG: KEGG entry
- MetaCyc: metabolic pathway
- PRIAM: profile
- PDB structures: RCSB PDB PDBe PDBsum
- Gene Ontology: AmiGO / QuickGO
Search
- PMC: articles
- PubMed: articles
- NCBI: proteins

Adenylate dimethylallyltransferase (EC 2.5.1.27) is an enzyme first characterised from tobacco that catalyzes a chemical reaction which converts adenosine monophosphate to N(6)-(dimethylallyl)adenosine 5'-monophosphate. It transfers an isoprenyl group from dimethylallyl pyrophosphate, giving orthophosphate (PP_{i}) as a byproduct. The reaction is part of the pathway to cytokinin plant hormones such as zeatin. the enzyme has also been found in Arabidopsis thaliana and Humulus lupulus.

dimethylallyl pyrophosphate
+
adenosine monophosphate
PP_{i}
N(6)-(dimethylallyl)adenosine 5'-monophosphate

This enzyme is a transferase, specifically those transferring aryl or alkyl groups other than methyl groups. The systematic name of this enzyme class is dimethylallyl-diphosphate:AMP dimethylallyltransferase. Other names in common use include cytokinin synthase, isopentenyltransferase, 2-isopentenyl-diphosphate:AMP Delta2-isopentenyltransferase, and adenylate isopentenyltransferase.
