= Zeatin 9-aminocarboxyethyltransferase =

Class of enzymes

Identifiers
- EC no.: 2.5.1.50
- CAS no.: 62683-23-2

Databases
- IntEnz: IntEnz view
- BRENDA: BRENDA entry
- ExPASy: NiceZyme view
- KEGG: KEGG entry
- MetaCyc: metabolic pathway
- PRIAM: profile
- PDB structures: RCSB PDB PDBe PDBsum
- Gene Ontology: AmiGO / QuickGO
Search
- PMC: articles
- PubMed: articles
- NCBI: proteins

Zeatin 9-aminocarboxyethyltransferase (EC 2.5.1.50) is an enzyme that catalyzes the chemical reaction

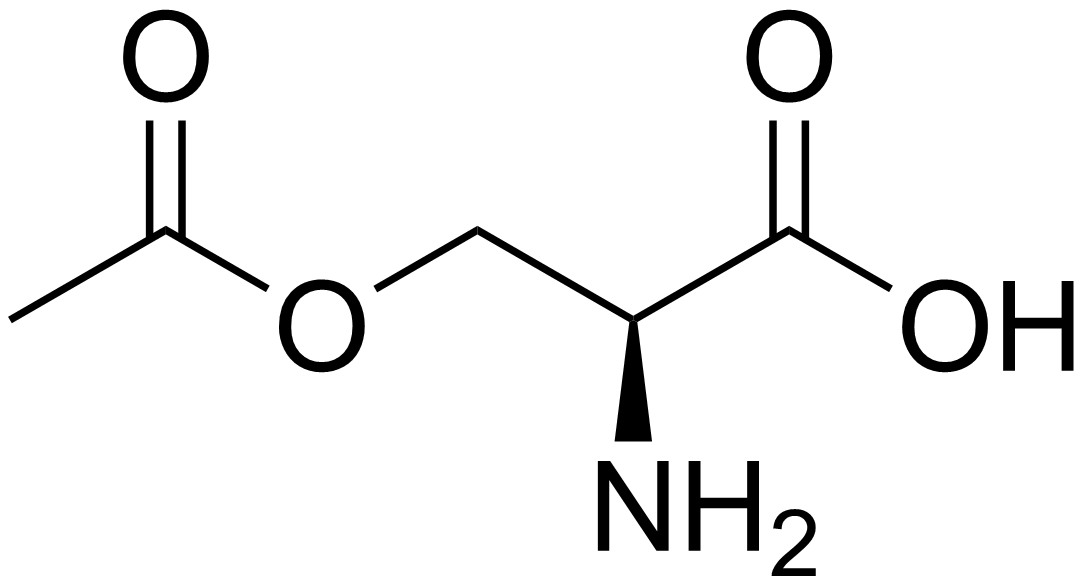
O-acetylserine
+
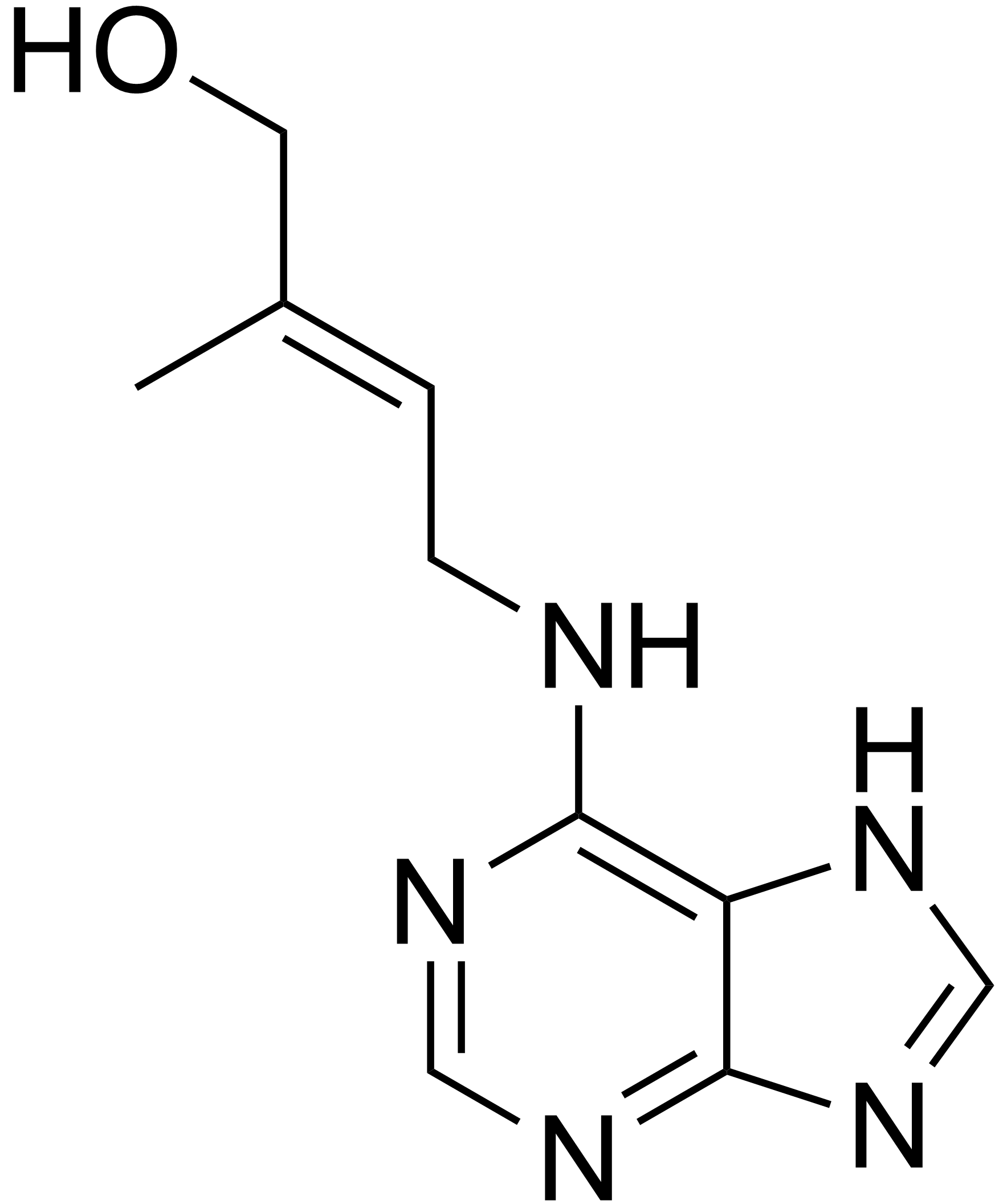
zeatin
CH_{3}CO_{2}H
lupinic acid

The two substrates of this enzyme are O-acetylserine and zeatin. The enyme characterised from lupin transfers the 2-amino-2-carboxyethyl group from the amino acid to the plant cytokinin, zeatin, giving lupinic acid, with acetic acid as a byproduct. The product has no hormonal activity and may have a role in regulating the amounts of zeatin present.

This enzyme belongs to the family of transferases, specifically those transferring aryl or alkyl groups other than methyl groups. The systematic name of this enzyme class is O3-acetyl-L-serine:zeatin 2-amino-2-carboxyethyltransferase. Other names in common use include beta-(9-cytokinin)-alanine synthase, beta-(9-cytokinin)alanine synthase, O-acetyl-L-serine acetate-lyase (adding N6-substituted adenine), lupinate synthetase, lupinic acid synthase, lupinic acid synthetase, and 3-O-acetyl-L-serine:zeatin 2-amino-2-carboxyethyltransferase.
