= Skoog (surname) =

Skoog is a surname. Notable people with the surname include:

- Arne Skoog (1913–1999), Swedish journalist and broadcaster
- Christer Skoog (born 1945), Swedish politician
- Curt Skoog, American politician
- Ed Skoog (born 1971), American poet
- Ewa Skoog Haslum (born 1968), Swedish Navy officer
- Folke K. Skoog (1908–2001), Swedish plant physiologist
- Helge Skoog (born 1938), Swedish actor, TV series Teatersport
- Henrik Skoog (born 1979), Swedish middle-distance runner
- Matz Skoog (1957–2026), Swedish ballet dancer and artistic director
- Myer Skoog (1926–2019), American basketball player
- Niklas Skoog (born 1974), Swedish football player
- Wilmer Skoog (born 1999), Swedish ice hockey player

== See also ==
- Skoog, electronic musical instrument
- Murashige and Skoog medium or (MSO or MS0 (MS-zero)), a plant growth medium for cultivation of plant cell culture

Media related to Skoog (surname) at Wikimedia Commons
