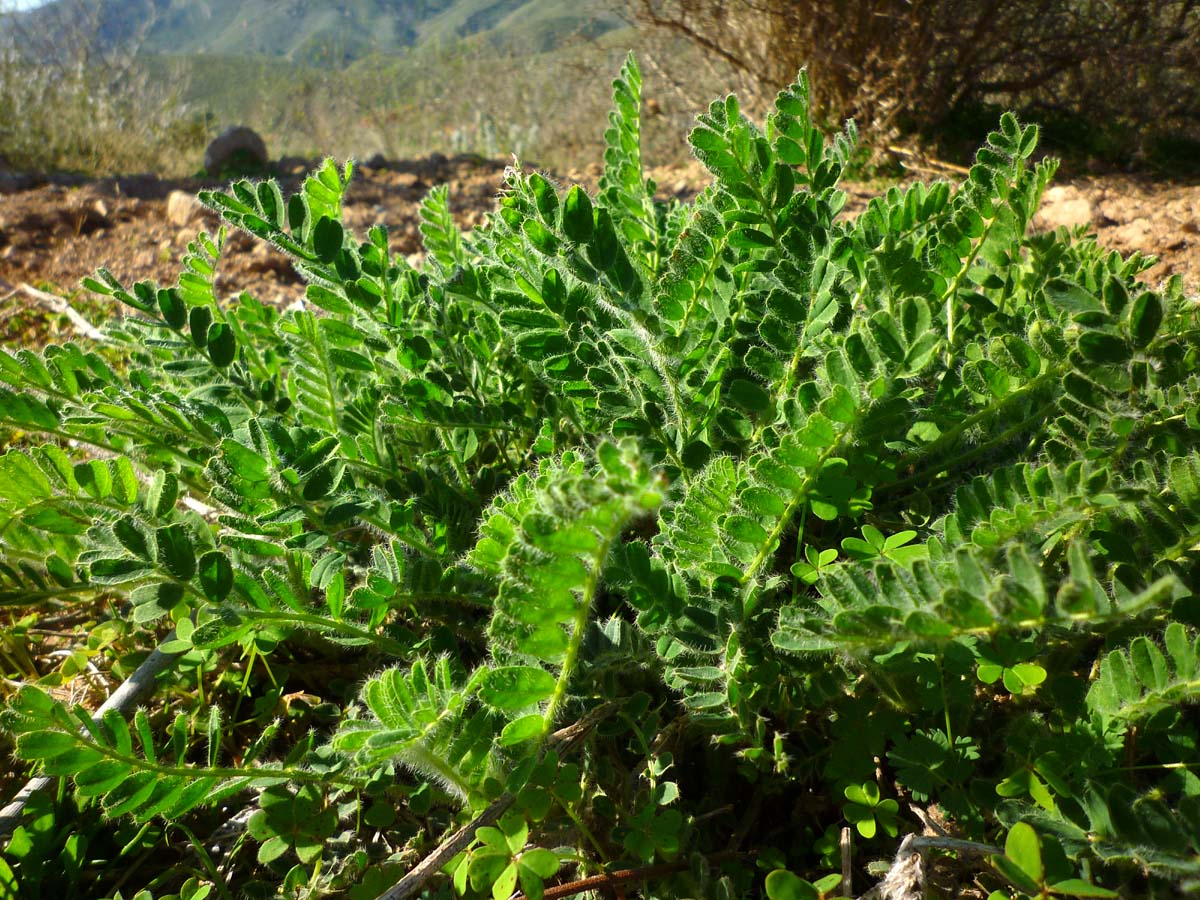

Conservation status
- Extinct (yes) (IUCN 3.1)

Scientific classification
- Kingdom: Plantae
- Clade: Tracheophytes
- Clade: Angiosperms
- Clade: Eudicots
- Clade: Rosids
- Order: Fabales
- Family: Fabaceae
- Subfamily: Faboideae
- Genus: Astragalus
- Species: †A. nitidiflorus

Binomial name
- †Astragalus nitidiflorus Jiménez & Pau

= Astragalus nitidiflorus =

Species of legume

Astragalus nitidiflorus (also known as Garbancillo de Tallante) is a species of legume in the family Fabaceae. It is endemic to the province of Murcia in southern Spain, where it forms the only known metapopulation worldwide. Its natural habitat is Mediterranean-type shrubby vegetation.

== Description ==
Astragalus nitidiflorus was first described by the Cartagena botanist Francisco de Paula Jiménez Munuera and Carlos Pau y Español in 1910.

The species was thought extinct until a few individual plants were discovered in 2003 near Cartagena. ISSR markers helped to find that Astragalus nitidiflorus had a low genetic diversity. "This species used to grow in shallow soil from metamorphic and volcanic rocks in between mountain and cultivated areas".

Astragalus nitidiflorus was arranged in five spatially separated populations with about two thousand specimens. To increase this plants population size a natural regeneration had to occur. Early in 2005 demographic studies about Astragalus nitidiflores identified roughly 69 adult plants". Although the IUCN classifies the species as extinct since 2006, the Spanish Environment Ministry includes it as "in danger of extinction" ("en peligro de extinción") in its list of Wild Species Under Special Protection (139/2011, 04 February 2011).

The Universidad Politécnica de Cartagena initiated a conservation project in 2012 that was partly funded by the European Commission.

Most of the individuals are preserved in a protected area called "Cabezos del Pericón", a Site of Community Importance included in the Natura 2000 ecological network.

== Etymology ==
Nitidiflorus: Latin epithet meaning "bright with flowers".

== Biology ==
The life cycle of A. nitidiflorus begins with seeds, which germinate in autumn and winter. In summer, leaves and stems die and only a few buds remain at the base of the stem at ground level. After the autumn rains, the dormant buds of the P1 plants that have survived the summer sprout and begin a second stage of growth.

A. nitidiflorus is a short-lived legume that colonizes old fields on volcanic soils. Most seeds and fruits were distributed in the soil surface layer (Table S1), and, except for 2011, most seeds were found inside fruits. This is explained by the type of fruit of A. nitidiflorus, an indehiscent and hard legume that prevents rapid release of seeds, which remain some years inside the fruit. Moreover, the considerable size of these fruits (ca. 1.9 cm 0.8 cm) hampers their burial, and nearly 100% them were on the soil surface.

"The life cycle of this species is very weak due to its low germination and limited adult species Extreme climate conditions can lead to a decrease in population.".

=== Habitat and cultivation ===
The seed bank is poor and very sensitive to changes in population size. The indehiscent fruit determines seed distribution in the soil around its mother plants. "A. nitidiflorus is able to form a short-term persistent soil seed bank". The seeding process happens in the summer months when there is a surplus water supply.

=== Beneficial uses ===
Not only with the Astragalus nitidiflorus, but most of the Astragalus plants have a plethora uses. Ranging from medicinal purposes, like helping treat the common cold or allergies, to feeding plants because of its good animal nutrition or the roots being good for controlling erosion.

=== Threats to species ===
"Natural regeneration is not expected for patches where the species disappeared few years ago".

=== Conservation ===
After the reappearance of this plant, the regional government of Murcia has declared this species as endangered. The known populations were under the protection of LIC of losCabezos Pericón spaces and the natural park of Sierra de la Muela, Cabo Tiñoso and Roldan. Some specimens also appeared nearby the Black Cabeza de Tallante, that is close to an extinct Quaternary volcano, Cabezos Pericón. The population that used to be in the south-facing slopes part of Cabezos Pericón has been proposed as botany micorreserva with the name " Perez scrub the Netherlands '. The populations was also already protected as a Site of Community Importance (SCI ). One of the main goals in conserving this plant is preserving the genetic diversity of the endangered species Long-term survival and the evolution of species depends on the maintenance of genetic connectivity To maintain this plant's population habitat destruction must be prevented. Attempts to save this plant along with many of the other Astragalus plants have been made through the use of Thidiazuron. This is because of the plant's naturally slow seedling development and seed germination. A chemical which is a plant growth regulator which helps the plants be stronger and grow faster. This has been shown to help the plants grow even sterile seedlings but the sterile seedlings did not have healthy development. The regenerated shoots, however, had much more success and were even able to be transferred to another place. However, this chemical does have negative side-effects such as hyperhydricity and poor shoot development which can occur but do not always present itself.

=== Comparison with A. gines-lopezii ===
Astragalus gines-lopezii, A.nitidiflorus and A. devesae were described as the same species which was A. nitidiflorus. A. gines-lopezii is one of the phylogenetically closest species to A. nitidiflorus. A. nitidiflorus has a very high reproductive capacity on the production of flowers and seeds than A. gineslopezii. On the contrary, the proportion of flowers setting ripe fruits in A. gines-lopezii is higher compare to than in A. nitidiflorus.

== Sources ==
- Error
- Life History and Demographic Features Life history and demographic features of Astragalus nitidiflorus, a critically endangered species
- Genetic Diversity Genetic diversity of Astragalus nitidiflorus, a critically endangered endemic of SE Spain, and implications for its conservation
- "Could recently locally extinct population patches of Astragalus nitidiflorus regenerate from the soil seed bank?"Could recently locally extinct population patches of Astragalus nitidiflorus regenerate from the soil seed bank?
- Germination of Astragalus gines-lopezii
- ASTRAGALUS SCHIZOPTERUS
