= Embryo rescue =

Embryo rescue is one of the earliest and successful forms of in-vitro culture techniques that is used to assist in the development of plant embryos that might not survive to become viable plants. Embryo rescue plays an important role in modern plant breeding, allowing the development of many interspecific and intergeneric food and ornamental plant crop hybrids. This technique nurtures the immature or weak embryo, thus allowing it the chance to survive. Plant embryos are multicellular structures that have the potential to develop into a new plant. The most widely used embryo rescue procedure is referred to as embryo culture, and involves excising plant embryos and placing them onto media culture. Embryo rescue is most often used to create interspecific and intergeneric crosses that would normally produce seeds which are aborted. Interspecific incompatibility in plants can occur for many reasons, but most often embryo abortion occurs In plant breeding, wide hybridization crosses can result in small shrunken seeds which indicate that fertilization has occurred, however the seed fails to develop. Many times, remote hybridizations will fail to undergo normal sexual reproduction, thus embryo rescue can assist in circumventing this problem.

== History ==
Embryo rescue was first documented in the 18th century when Charles Bonnet excised Phaseolus and Fagopyrum embryos and was successful in it, planted them in soil and the cross resulted in dwarf plants. Soon after this, scientists began placing the embryos in various nutrient media. During the period of 1890 to 1904, systems for embryo rescue became systematic by applying nutrient solutions that contained salts and sugars and applying aseptic technique. The first successful in vitro embryo culture was performed by Hanning in 1904, he however described problems with precocious embryos that resulted in small, weak, and often inviable plantlets.

== Applications ==
- Breeding of incompatible interspecific and intergeneric species
- Overcoming seed dormancy
- Determination of seed viability
- Recovery of maternal haploids that develop as a result of chromosome elimination following interspecific hybridization
- Used in studies on the physiology of seed germination and development

== Techniques ==
Depending on the organ cultured, it may be referred to as either embryo, ovule, or ovary culture. Ovule culture or in vitro embryo culture is a modified technique of embryo rescue whereby embryos are cultured while still inside their ovules to prevent damaging them during the excision process. Ovary or pod culture, on the other hand employs the use of an entire ovary into culture. It becomes necessary to excise the entire small embryo to prevent early embryo abortion. However, it is technically difficult to isolate the tiny intact embryos, so often ovaries with young embryos, or entire fertilized ovules will be used.

== See also ==
- Plant embryogenesis
- Callus (cell biology)
- Plant tissue culture
- Plant hormone
- Hyperhydricity
- Somatic embryogenesis
