= Hyperhydricity =

Hyperhydricity (previously known as vitrification) is a physiological malformation that results in excessive hydration, low lignification, impaired stomatal function and reduced mechanical strength of tissue culture-generated plants. The consequence is poor regeneration of such plants without intensive greenhouse acclimation for outdoor growth. Additionally, it may also lead to leaf-tip and bud necrosis in some cases, which often leads to loss of apical dominance in the shoots. In general, the main symptom of hyperhydricity is translucent characteristics signified by a shortage of chlorophyll and high water content. Specifically, the presence of a thin or absent cuticular layer, reduced number of palisade cells, irregular stomata, less developed cell wall and large intracellular spaces in the mesophyll cell layer have been described as some of the anatomic changes associated with hyperhydricity.

== Causes ==
The main causes of hyperhydricity in plant tissue culture are those factors triggering oxidative stresses such as high salt concentration, high relative humidity, low light intensity, gas accumulation in the atmosphere of the jar, length of time intervals between subcultures; number of subcultures, concentration and type of gelling agent, the type of explants used, the concentrations of microelement and hormonal imbalances. Hyperhydricity is commonly apparent in liquid culture-grown plants or when there is low concentration of gelling agent. High ammonium concentration also contributes to hyperhydricity.

== Control ==
Hyperhydricity can be monitored by modifying the atmosphere of the culture vessels. Adjusting the relative humidity in the vessel is one of the most important parameters to be controlled. Use of gas-permeable membranes may help in this regard as this allows increased exchange of water vapor and other gases such as ethylene with the surrounding environment. Using higher concentration of a gelling agent, on top of the use of a higher-strength gelling agent may reduce the risk from hyperhydricity. Hyperhydricity can also be controlled by bottom cooling, which allows water to condense on the medium, the use of cytokinin-meta-topolin (6-(3-Hydroxybenzylamino)purine)</9>, the combination of lower cytokinin and ammonium nitrate in the medium, use of nitrate or glutamine as the sole nitrogen source and decreasing the ratio of NH4+:NO3- in the medium. In studies on calcium deficiency in tissue cultures of Lavandula angustifolia, it was shown that an increase in calcium in the medium reduced hyperhydricity.

== See also ==
- Callus (cell biology)
- Chimera (genetics)
- Somatic embryogenesis
- Embryo rescue
