= Murashige =

- Gender: Male

Origin
- Origin: Japanese
- Meaning: Different meanings depending on the kanji used

Murashige (written: 村重) is both a Japanese surname and a masculine Japanese given name. Notable people with the name include:

== Surname ==
- Anna Murashige (村重 杏奈; born 1998), Japanese singer and idol
- Toshio Murashige, American botanist

== Given name ==
- Araki Murashige (荒木 村重; 1535–1586), Japanese samurai
