= Zeatin reductase =

Class of enzymes

zeatin reductase

Identifiers
- EC no.: 1.3.1.69
- CAS no.: 123644-82-6

Databases
- IntEnz: IntEnz view
- BRENDA: BRENDA entry
- ExPASy: NiceZyme view
- KEGG: KEGG entry
- MetaCyc: metabolic pathway
- PRIAM: profile
- PDB structures: RCSB PDB PDBe PDBsum
- Gene Ontology: AmiGO / QuickGO
Search
- PMC: articles
- PubMed: articles
- NCBI: proteins

In enzymology, zeatin reductase (EC 1.3.1.69) is an enzyme that catalyzes the chemical reaction

zeatin
+ NADPH
H^{+}
H^{+}
dihydrozeatin
+ NADP^{+}

The three substrates of this enzyme are trans-zeatin, reduced nicotinamide adenine dinucleotide phosphate (NADPH) and a proton. Its products are dihydrozeatin and NADP^{+}. The enzyme does not act on cis-zeatin.

This enzyme belongs to the family of oxidoreductases, specifically those acting on the CH-CH group of donor with NAD+ or NADP+ as acceptor. The systematic name of this enzyme class is dihydrozeatin:NADP+ oxidoreductase.
