= Micropropagation =

Practice in plant tissue culture

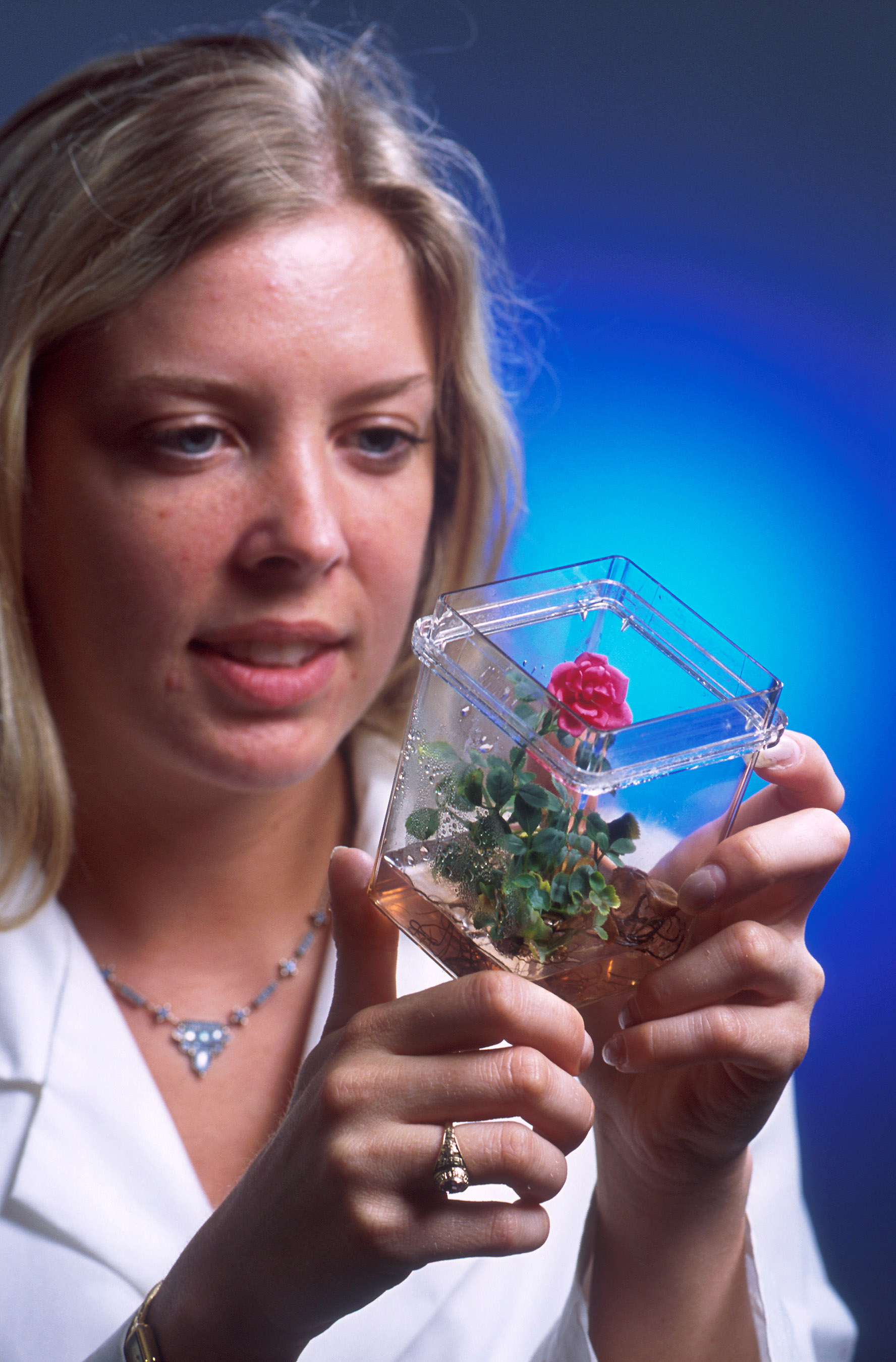
A rose plant that began as cells grown in a tissue culture

Micropropagation or tissue culture is the practice of rapidly multiplying plant stock material to produce many progeny plants, using modern plant tissue culture methods.

Micropropagation is used to multiply a wide variety of plants, such as those that have been genetically modified or bred through conventional plant breeding methods. It is also used to provide a sufficient number of plantlets for planting from seedless plants, plants that do not respond well to vegetative reproduction or where micropropagation is the cheaper means of propagating (e.g. Orchids). Cornell University botanist Frederick Campion Steward discovered and pioneered micropropagation and plant tissue culture in the late 1950s and early 1960s.

== Steps ==
In short, steps of micropropagation can be divided into four stages:

1. Selection of mother plant
2. Multiplication
3. Rooting and acclimatizing
4. Transfer new plant to soil

=== Selection of mother plant ===
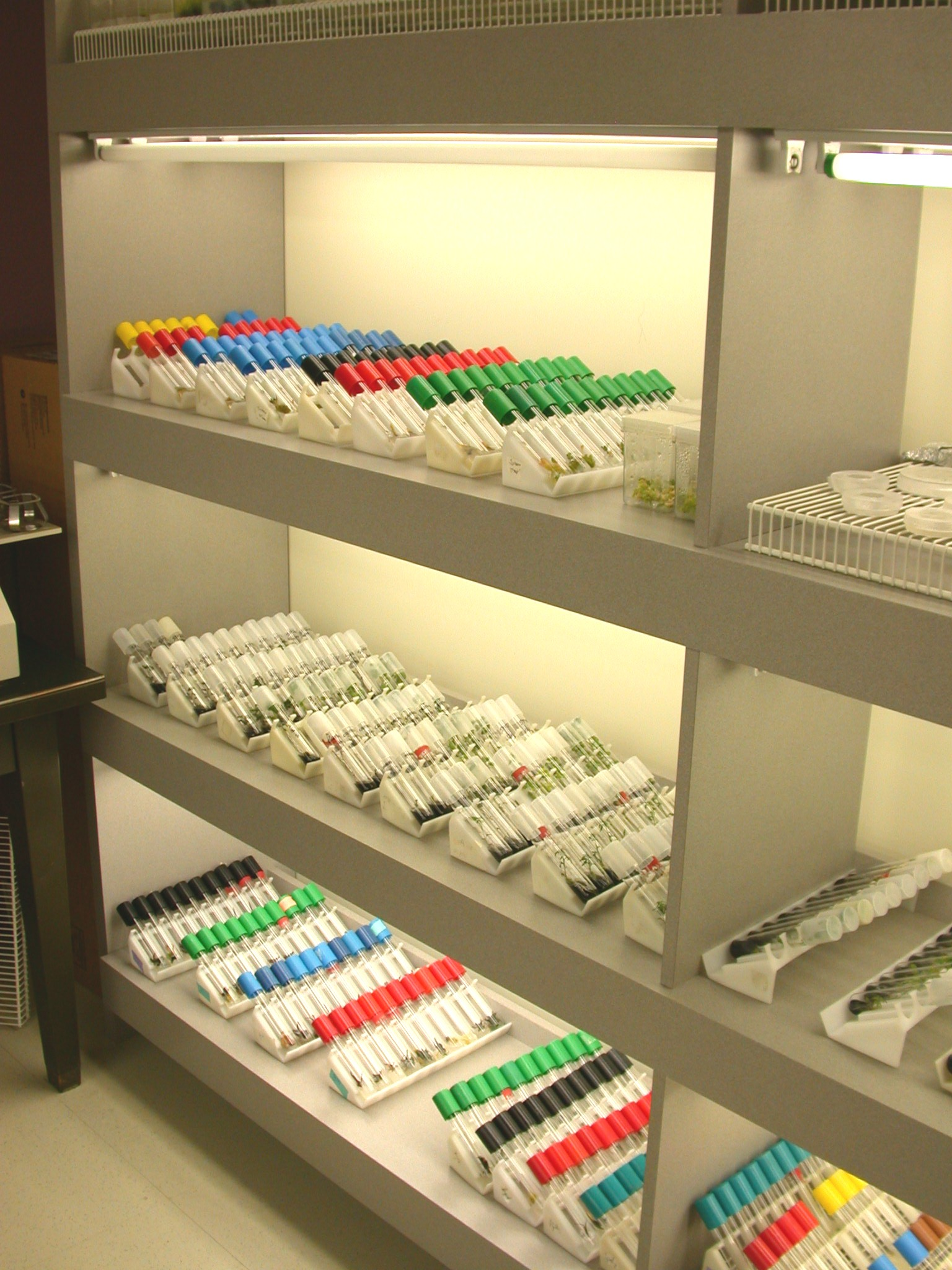
In vitro culture of plants in a controlled, sterile environment

Micropropagation begins with the selection of plant material to be propagated. The plant tissues are removed from an intact plant in a sterile condition. Clean stock materials that are free of viruses and fungi are important in the production of the healthiest plants. Once the plant material is chosen for culture, the collection of explant(s) begins and is dependent on the type of tissue to be used, including stem tips, anthers, petals, pollen and other plant tissues. The explant material is then surface sterilized, usually in multiple courses of bleach and alcohol washes, and finally rinsed in sterilized water. This small portion of plant tissue, sometimes only a single cell, is placed on a growth medium, typically containing Macro and micronutrients, water, sucrose as an energy source and one or more plant growth regulators (plant hormones). Micropropagation without sugar in the growth medium is also possible through photoautotrophic tissue culture. Usually, the medium is thickened with a gelling agent, such as agar, to create a gel which supports the explant during growth. Some plants are easily grown on simple media, but others require more complicated media for successful growth; the plant tissue grows and differentiates into new tissues depending on the medium. For example, media containing cytokinin are used to create branched shoots from plant buds.

=== Multiplication ===
Multiplication is the taking of tissue samples produced during the first stage and increasing their number. Following the successful introduction and growth of plant tissue, the establishment stage is followed by multiplication. Through repeated cycles of this process, a single explant sample may be increased from one to hundreds and thousands of plants. Depending on the type of tissue grown, multiplication can involve different methods and media. If the plant material grown is callus tissue, it can be placed in a blender and cut into smaller pieces and recultured on the same type of culture medium to grow more callus tissue. If the tissue is grown as small plants called plantlets, hormones are often added that cause the plantlets to produce many small offshoots. After the formation of multiple shoots, these shoots are transferred to rooting medium with a high auxin\cytokinin ratio. After the development of roots, plantlets can be used for hardening.

=== Pretransplant ===
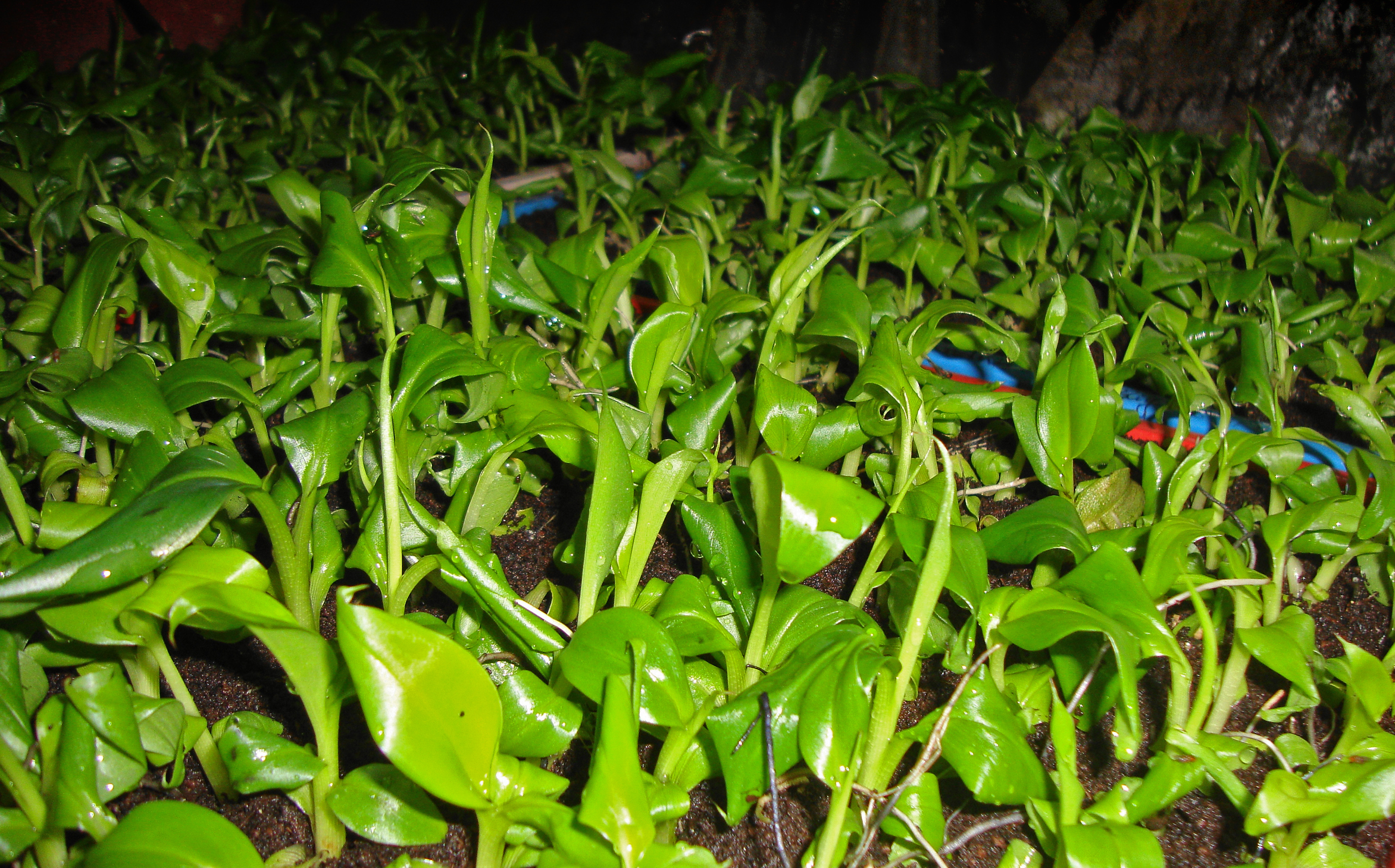
Banana plantlets transferred to soil (with vermicompost) from plant media. This process is done for acclimatization of plantlets to the soil as they were previously grown in plant media. After growing for some days the plantlets are transferred to the field.

This stage involves treating the plantlets/shoots produced to encourage root growth and "hardening." It is performed in vitro, or in a sterile "test tube" environment.

"Hardening" refers to the preparation of the plants for a natural growth environment. Until this stage, the plantlets have been grown in "ideal" conditions, designed to encourage rapid growth. Due to the controlled nature of their maturation, the plantlets often do not have fully functional dermal coverings. This causes them to be highly susceptible to disease and inefficient in their use of water and energy. In vitro conditions are high in humidity, and plants grown under these conditions often do not form a working cuticle and stomata that keep the plant from drying out. When taken out of culture, the plantlets need time to adjust to more natural environmental conditions. Hardening typically involves slowly weaning the plantlets from a high-humidity, low light, warm environment to what would be considered a normal growth environment for the species in question.

=== Transfer from culture ===
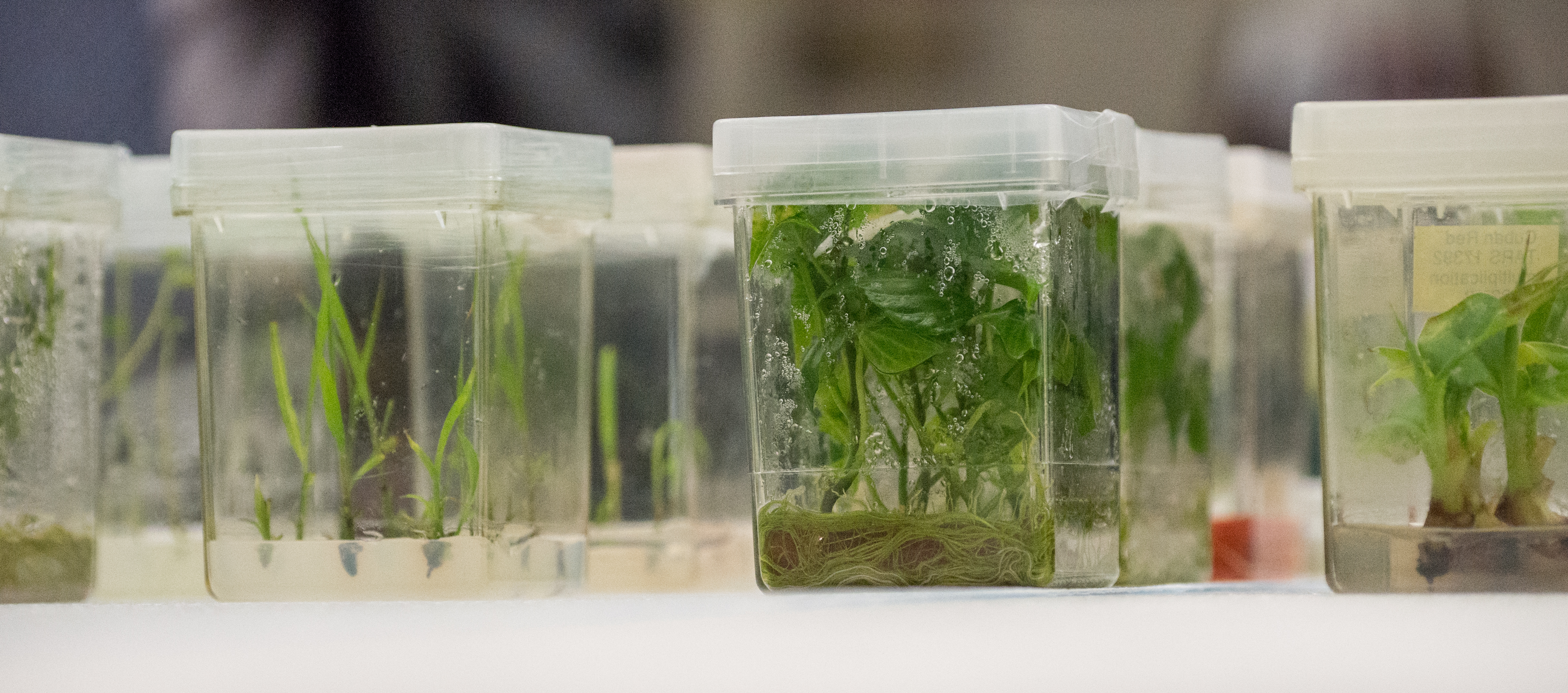
Plant tissue cultures being grown at a USDA seed bank, the National Center for Genetic Resources Preservation

In the final stage of plant micropropagation, the plantlets are removed from the plant media and transferred to soil or (more commonly) potting compost for continued growth by conventional methods.

This stage is often combined with the "pretransplant" stage.

== Methods ==
There are many methods of plant micro propagation.

=== Meristem culture ===
In Meristem culture, the meristem and a few subtending leaf primordia are placed into a suitable growing media. where they are induced to form new meristem. These meristems are then divided and further grown and multiplied. To produce plantlets the meristems are taken of from their proliferation medium and put on a regeneration medium. When an elongated rooted plantlet is produced after some weeks, it can be transferred to the soil. A disease-free plant can be produced by this method. Experimental result also suggest that this technique can be successfully utilized for rapid multiplication of various plant species, e.g. Coconut, strawberry, sugarcane.

=== Callus culture ===
A callus is mass of undifferentiated parenchymatous cells. When a living plant tissue is placed in an artificial growing medium with other conditions favorable, callus is formed. The growth of callus varies with the homogenous levels of auxin and cytokinin and can be manipulated by endogenous supply of these growth regulators in the culture medium. The callus growth and its organogenesis or embryogenesis can be referred into three different stages.

- Stage I: Rapid production of callus after placing the explants in culture medium
- Stage II: The callus is transferred to other medium containing growth regulators for the induction of adventitious organs.
- Stage III: The new plantlet is then exposed gradually to the environmental condition.

=== Embryo culture ===
In embryo culture, the embryo is cut out and placed into a culture medium with proper nutrient in aseptic condition. To obtain a quick and optimum growth into plantlets, it is transferred to soil. It is particularly important for the production of interspecific and intergeneric hybrids and to overcome the embryo.

=== Protoplast culture ===
In protoplast culture, the plant cell can be isolated with the help of wall degrading enzymes and growth in a suitable culture medium in a controlled condition for regeneration of plantlets. Under suitable conditions the protoplast develops a cell wall followed by an increase in cell division and differentiation and grows into a new plant. The protoplast is first cultured in liquid medium at 25 to 28 C with a light intensity of 100 to 500 lux or in dark and after undergoing substantial cell division, they are transferred into solid medium congenial or morphogenesis in many horticultural crops respond well to protoplast culture.

== Advantages ==
Micropropagation has a number of advantages over traditional plant propagation techniques:

- The main advantage of micropropagation is the production of many plants that are clones of each other.
- Micropropagation can be used to produce disease-free plants.
- It can have an extraordinarily high fecundity rate, producing thousands of propagules while conventional techniques might only produce a fraction of this number.
- It is the only viable method of regenerating genetically modified cells or cells after protoplast fusion.
- It is useful in multiplying plants which produce seeds in uneconomical amounts, or when plants are sterile and do not produce viable seeds or when seed cannot be stored (see recalcitrant seeds).
- Micropropagation often produces more robust plants, leading to accelerated growth compared to similar plants produced by conventional methods - like seeds or cuttings.
- Some plants with very small seeds, including most orchids, are most reliably grown from seed in sterile culture.
- A greater number of plants can be produced per square meter and the propagules can be stored longer and in a smaller area.

== Disadvantages ==
Micropropagation is not always the perfect means of multiplying plants. Conditions that limits its use include:

- Labour may make up 50–69% of operating costs.
- All plants produced via micropropagation are genetically identical clones, leading to a lack of overall disease resilience, as all progeny plants may be vulnerable to the same infections.
- An infected plant sample can produce infected progeny. This is uncommon as the stock plants are carefully screened and vetted to prevent culturing plants infected with virus or fungus.
- Not all plants can be successfully tissue cultured, often because the proper medium for growth is not known or the plants produce secondary metabolic chemicals that stunt or kill the explant.
- Sometimes plants or cultivars do not come true to type after being tissue cultured. This is often dependent on the type of explant material utilized during the initiation phase or the result of the age of the cell or propagule line.
- Some plants are very difficult to disinfect of fungal organisms.

The major limitation in the use of micropropagation for many plants is the cost of production; for many plants the use of seeds, which are normally disease free and produced in good numbers, readily produce plants (see orthodox seed) in good numbers at a lower cost. For this reason, many plant breeders do not utilize micropropagation because the cost is prohibitive. Other breeders use it to produce stock plants that are then used for seed multiplication.

Mechanisation of the process could reduce labour costs, but has proven difficult to achieve, despite active attempts to develop technological solutions.

== Applications ==
Micropropagation facilitates the growth, storage, and maintenance of a large number of plants in small spaces, which makes it a cost-effective process. Micropropagation is used for germplasm storage and the protection of endangered species. Micropropagation is widely used in ornamental plants to efficiently produce large quantities of uniform, disease-free specimens, significantly enhancing commercial horticulture operations. Among the species broadly propagated in vitro, one can mention chrysanthemum, damask rose, Saintpaulia ionantha, Zamioculcas zamiifolia and bleeding heart. Micropropagation can also be used with fruit trees, e.g. Pyrus communis. In order to reduce expenditures, natural plant extracts can be used to substitute traditional plant growth regulators.
