= Kinetin =

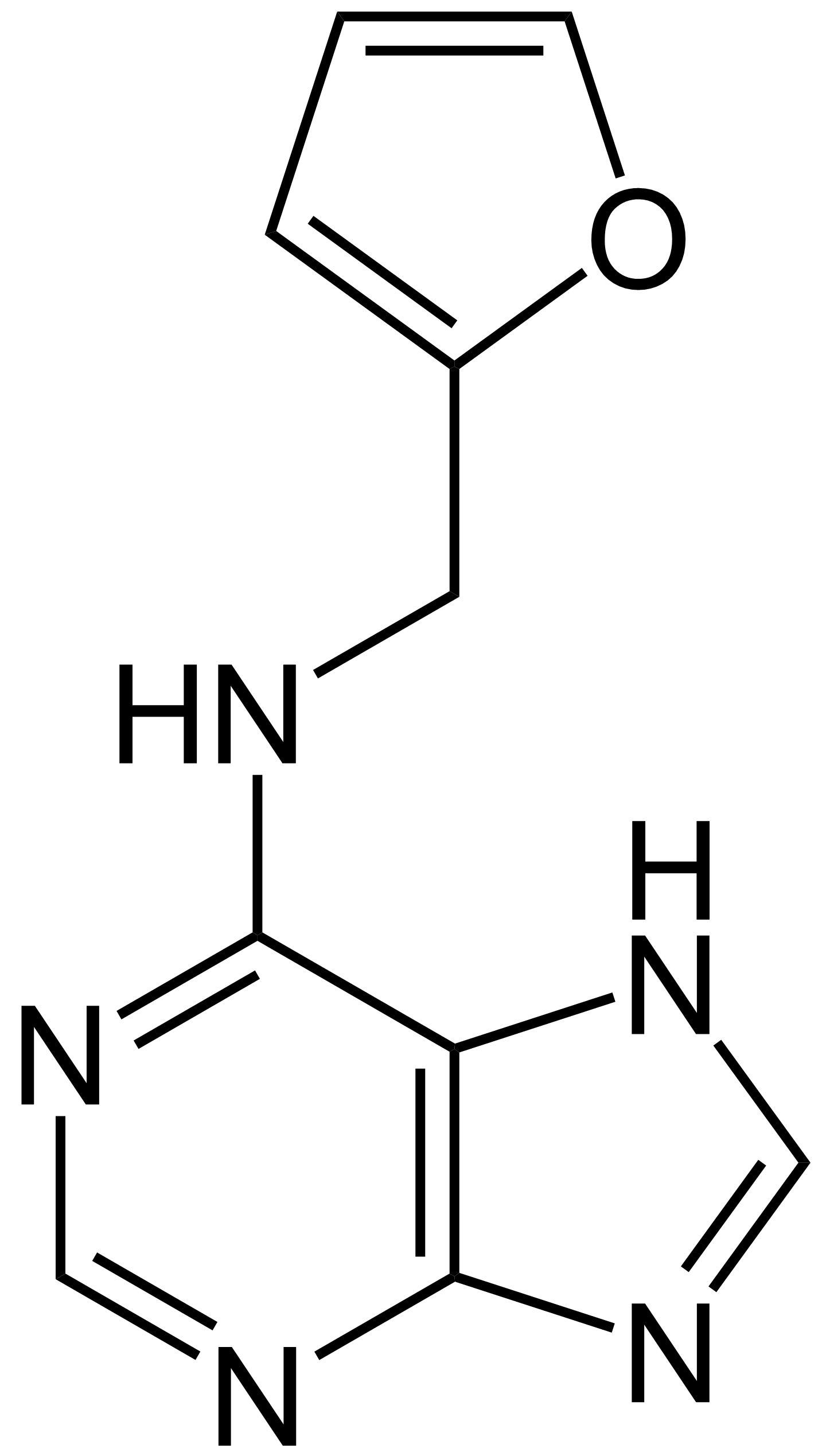

Names
- IUPAC name N^{6}-furfuryladenine

Identifiers
CAS Number	525-79-1
3D model (JSmol)	Interactive image
ChEBI	CHEBI:27407
ChEMBL	ChEMBL228792
ChemSpider	3698
DrugBank	DB11336
ECHA InfoCard	100.007.622
EC Number	208-382-2
KEGG	C08272
PubChem CID	3830
RTECS number	AU6270000
UNII	P39Y9652YJ
CompTox Dashboard (EPA)	DTXSID9035175
- InChI: InChI=1S/C10H9N5O/c1-2-7(16-3-1)4-11-9-8-10(13-5-12-8)15-6-14-9/h1-3,5-6H,4H2,(H2,11,12,13,14,15) Key: QANMHLXAZMSUEX-UHFFFAOYSA-N
- SMILES: C(Nc1ncnc2nc[nH]c12)c1ccco1

Properties
Chemical formula	C_{10}H_{9}N_{5}O
Molar mass	215.216 g·mol^{−1}
Appearance	Off-white powder
Melting point	269–271 °C (516–520 °F; 542–544 K) (decomposes)

Structure
Crystal structure	cubic

Related compounds
Related	cytokinin
- Except where otherwise noted, data are given for materials in their standard state (at 25 °C [77 °F], 100 kPa). verify (what is ?) Infobox references

Kinetin (/'kaɪnɪtɪn/) is a cytokinin-like synthetic plant hormone that promotes cell division in plants. Kinetin was originally isolated by Carlos O. Miller and Skoog et al. as a compound from autoclaved herring sperm DNA that had cell division-promoting activity. It was given the name kinetin because of its ability to induce cell division, provided that auxin was present in the medium. Kinetin is often used in plant tissue culture to induce callus formation (in conjunction with auxin) and regenerate shoot tissues from callus (with lower auxin concentration).

For a long time, it was believed that kinetin was an artifact produced from the deoxyadenosine residues in DNA, which degraded when standing for long periods or when heated during the isolation procedure. Therefore, it was thought that kinetin does not occur naturally, but since 1996, it has been shown by several researchers that kinetin exists naturally in the DNA of cells of almost all organisms tested so far, including humans and various plants. The mechanism of production of kinetin in DNA is thought to be via the production of furfural — an oxidative damage product of deoxyribose sugar in DNA — and its quenching by the adenine base's converting it into N6-furfuryladenine, kinetin.

Kinetin is also widely used in producing new plants from tissue cultures.

== History ==
In 1939, P. A. C. Nobécourt (Paris) began the first permanent callus culture from root explants of carrots (Daucus carota). Such a culture can be kept forever by successive transplantations onto fresh nutrient agar. The transplantations occur every three to eight weeks. Callus cultures are not cell cultures since whole tissue associations are cultivated. Though many cells keep their ability to divide, this is not true for all. One reason for this is the aneuploidy of the nuclei and the resultant unfavourable chromosome constellations.

In 1941, J. van Overbeek (Rijksuniversiteit Utrecht) introduced coconut milk as a new component of nutrient media for callus cultures. Coconut milk is liquid endosperm. It stimulates the embryo to grow when it is supplied with food at the same time. Results yielded from callus cultures showed that its active components stimulate the growth of foreign cells, too.

In 1954 F. Skoog (University of Wisconsin, Madison) developed a technique for the generation and culture of wound tumor tissue from isolated shoot parts of tobacco (Nicotiana tabacum). The developing callus grows when supplied with yeast extract, coconut milk, or old DNA preparations. Freshly prepared DNA has no effect but becomes effective after autoclaving. This led to the conclusion that one of its breakdown products is required for cell growth and division. This characterized substance was named kinetin, and was classified as a phytohormone.
