= C13H12N2O =

The molecular formula C_{13}H_{12}N_{2}O (molar mass: 212.25 g/mol, exact mass: 212.0950 u) may refer to:

- Harmine, a beta-carboline enzyme inhibitor
- 6-Methoxyharman, isoharmine
- 1,3-Diphenylurea, a cytokinin plant hormone
