= Peggy Ozias-Akins =

American plant scientist

- Education: University of
- Scientific career
- Thesis: Cell proliferation and morphogenesis in tissue cultures of Triticum aestivum l. (1981)

Peggy Ozias-Akins is a Distinguished Professor at the University of Georgia known for her work on plant breeding, especially in peanuts. She was elected a fellow of the American Association for the Advancement of Science in 2009.

== Education and career ==
Ozias-Akins received a B.S. in from Florida State University in 1975. She earned her Ph.D. in botany from the University of Florida in 1981.

In 1986 Ozias-Akins moved to the University of Georgia as a faculty member, and in 2017 she was named a distinguished research professor at the University of Georgia.

== Research ==
Ozias-Akin is known for her work using molecular tools to change how crop plants such as peanuts or millet are grown. Her early research examined how wheat plants and peanuts reproduce using somatic embryogenesis, a process where a plant is formed from a single cell, a somatic embryo. Her early work on peanuts sought to use genetic techniques to reduce a peanut plants susceptibility to diseases. She has used a species of grass, pearl millet, to examine how plant cells produce a seed that is an exact copy, a process known as apomixis. Ozias-Akin began research on genetically modified peanuts in 2009. She sought to eliminate allergens in peanuts, but ultimately determined that was not a viable path to reducing peanut allergies.

== Selected publications ==
- Ozias-Akins, Peggy; Roche, Dominique; Hanna, Wayne W. (1998-04-28). "Tight clustering and hemizygosity of apomixis-linked molecular markers in Pennisetum squamulatum implies genetic control of apospory by a divergent locus that may have no allelic form in sexual genotypes". Proceedings of the National Academy of Sciences. 95 (9): 5127–5132. Bibcode:1998PNAS...95.5127O. doi:10.1073/pnas.95.9.5127. PMC 20225. PMID 9560240.
- Bertioli, David John; Cannon, Steven B; Froenicke, Lutz; Huang, Guodong; Farmer, Andrew D; Cannon, Ethalinda K S; Liu, Xin; Gao, Dongying; Clevenger, Josh; Dash, Sudhansu; Ren, Longhui; Moretzsohn, Márcio C; Shirasawa, Kenta; Huang, Wei; Vidigal, Bruna (2016). "The genome sequences of Arachis duranensis and Arachis ipaensis, the diploid ancestors of cultivated peanut". Nature Genetics. 48 (4): 438–446. doi:10.1038/ng.3517. hdl:2346/93664. ISSN 1061-4036. PMID 26901068.
- Ozias-Akins, Peggy; Vasil, Indra K. (1982). "Plant regeneration from cultured immature embryos and inflorescences ofTriticum aestivum L. (wheat): Evidence for somatic embryogenesis". Protoplasma. 110 (2): 95–105. Bibcode:1982Prpls.110...95O. doi:10.1007/BF01281535. ISSN 0033-183X.
- Ozias-Akins, Peggy; van Dijk, Peter J. (2007-12-01). "Mendelian Genetics of Apomixis in Plants". Annual Review of Genetics. 41 (1): 509–537. doi:10.1146/annurev.genet.40.110405.090511. ISSN 0066-4197. PMID 18076331.

== Awards and honors ==
Ozias-Akins was elected a fellow of the American Association for the Advancement of Science in 2009.
