= Cis-zeatin O-beta-D-glucosyltransferase =

Enzyme

Identifiers
- EC no.: 2.4.1.215

Databases
- IntEnz: IntEnz view
- BRENDA: BRENDA entry
- ExPASy: NiceZyme view
- KEGG: KEGG entry
- MetaCyc: metabolic pathway
- PRIAM: profile
- PDB structures: RCSB PDB PDBe PDBsum
- Gene Ontology: AmiGO / QuickGO
Search
- PMC: articles
- PubMed: articles
- NCBI: proteins

Cis-zeatin O-beta-D-glucosyltransferase (EC 2.4.1.215) is an enzyme that catalyzes the chemical reaction

cis-zeatin
+ UDP-glucose
UDP
O-β-D-glucosyl-cis-zeatin

The two substrates of this enzyme characterised from maize are cis-zeatin and UDP-glucose. Its products are O-β-D-glucosyl-cis-zeatin and uridine diphosphate (UDP).

This enzyme belongs to the family of glycosyltransferases, specifically the hexosyltransferases. The systematic name of this enzyme class is UDP-glucose:cis-zeatin O-beta-D-glucosyltransferase.

== See also ==
- Trans-zeatin O-beta-D-glucosyltransferase, an enzyme which gives the same reaction with trans-zeatin
