= Trans-zeatin O-beta-D-glucosyltransferase =

Class of enzymes

Identifiers
- EC no.: 2.4.1.203
- CAS no.: 123644-76-8

Databases
- IntEnz: IntEnz view
- BRENDA: BRENDA entry
- ExPASy: NiceZyme view
- KEGG: KEGG entry
- MetaCyc: metabolic pathway
- PRIAM: profile
- PDB structures: RCSB PDB PDBe PDBsum
- Gene Ontology: AmiGO / QuickGO
Search
- PMC: articles
- PubMed: articles
- NCBI: proteins

Trans-zeatin O-beta-D-glucosyltransferase (EC 2.4.1.203) is an enzyme that catalyzes the chemical reaction

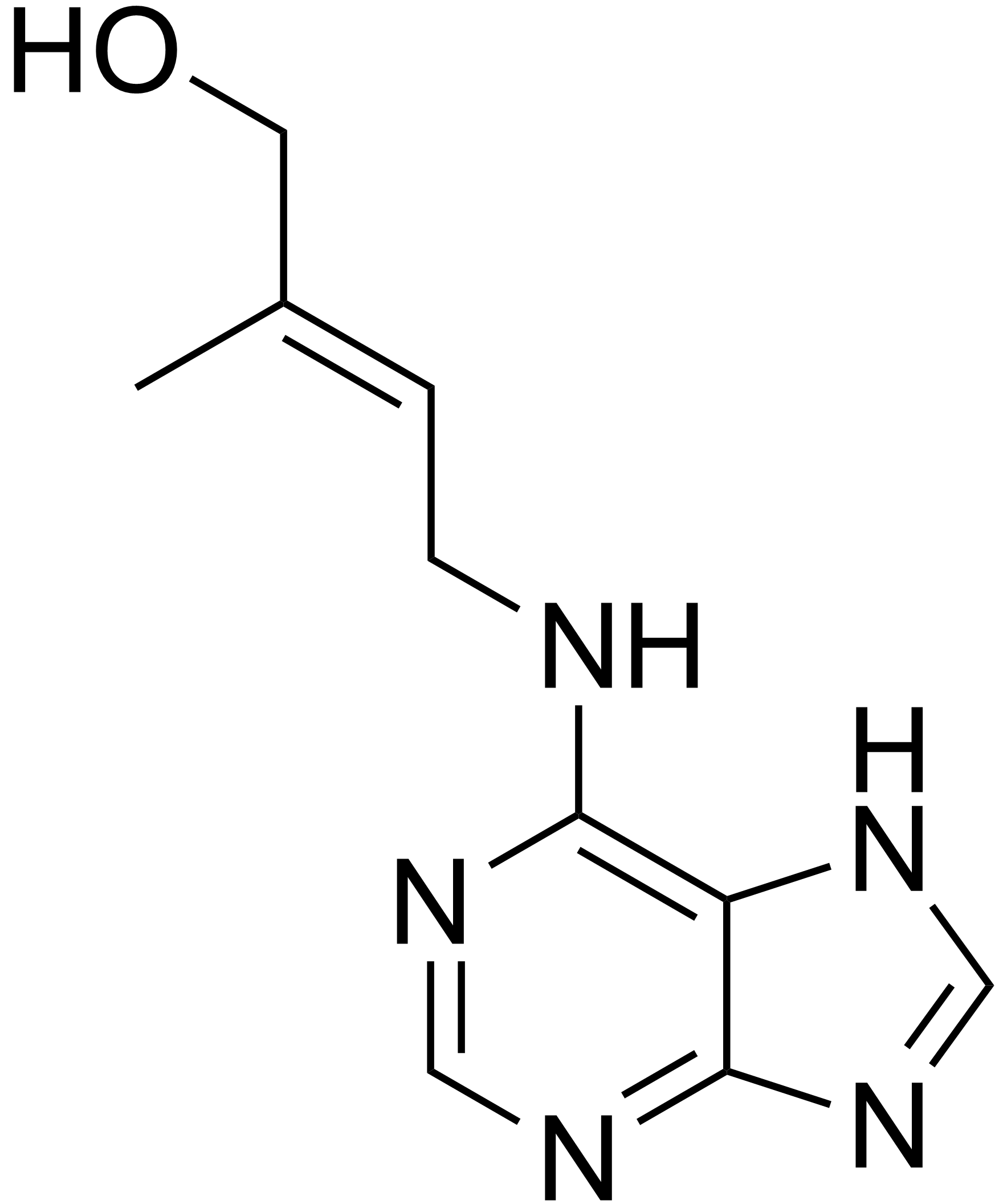
zeatin
+ UDP-glucose
UDP
O-β-D-glucosyl-trans-zeatin

The two substrates of this enzyme characterised from lima bean are trans-zeatin and UDP-glucose. Its products are O-β-D-glucosyl-trans-zeatin and uridine diphosphate (UDP).

This enzyme belongs to the family of glycosyltransferases, specifically the hexosyltransferases. The systematic name of this enzyme class is UDP-glucose:trans-zeatin O-beta-D-glucosyltransferase. Other names in common use include zeatin O-beta-D-glucosyltransferase, uridine diphosphoglucose-zeatin O-glucosyltransferase, and zeatin O-glucosyltransferase.

== See also ==
- Cis-zeatin O-beta-D-glucosyltransferase, an enzyme which gives the same reaction with cis-zeatin
