= Streptomyces angustmyceticus =

Scientific classification
- Domain: Bacteria
- Kingdom: Bacillati
- Phylum: Actinomycetota
- Class: Actinomycetia
- Order: Streptomycetales
- Family: Streptomycetaceae
- Genus: Streptomyces
- Species: S. angustmyceticus

Binomial name
- Streptomyces angustmyceticus (Yüntsen et al. 1956) Kumar and Goodfellow 2010

Type strain
- ATCC 15484, CGMCC 4.1918, CIP 106838, DSM 41683, IAM 6 A-704, IAM 72, IAM 9-8, IFO 14017, IFO 3934, JCM 4053, KACC 20128, KCC S-0053, KCTC 1089, NBRC 14017, NBRC 3934, NRRL B-2347, NRRL B-3306, UC 2633, VTT E-072759, Yonehara 6A-704

Synonyms
- Streptomyces hygroscopicus subsp. angustmyceticus

Species of bacterium

Streptomyces angustmyceticus is a bacterium species from the genus Streptomyces. Streptomyces angustmyceticus produces angustmycin.

== See also ==
- List of Streptomyces species
