= Callus (cell biology) =

Growing mass of unorganized plant parenchyma cells

Plant callus (plural calluses or calli) is a growing mass of unorganized plant parenchyma cells. In living plants, callus cells are those cells that cover a plant wound. In biological research and biotechnology callus formation is induced from plant tissue samples (explants) after surface sterilization and plating onto tissue culture medium in vitro (in a closed culture vessel such as a Petri dish). The culture medium is supplemented with plant growth regulators, such as auxin, cytokinin, and gibberellin, to initiate callus formation or somatic embryogenesis. Callus initiation has been described for all major groups of land plants.

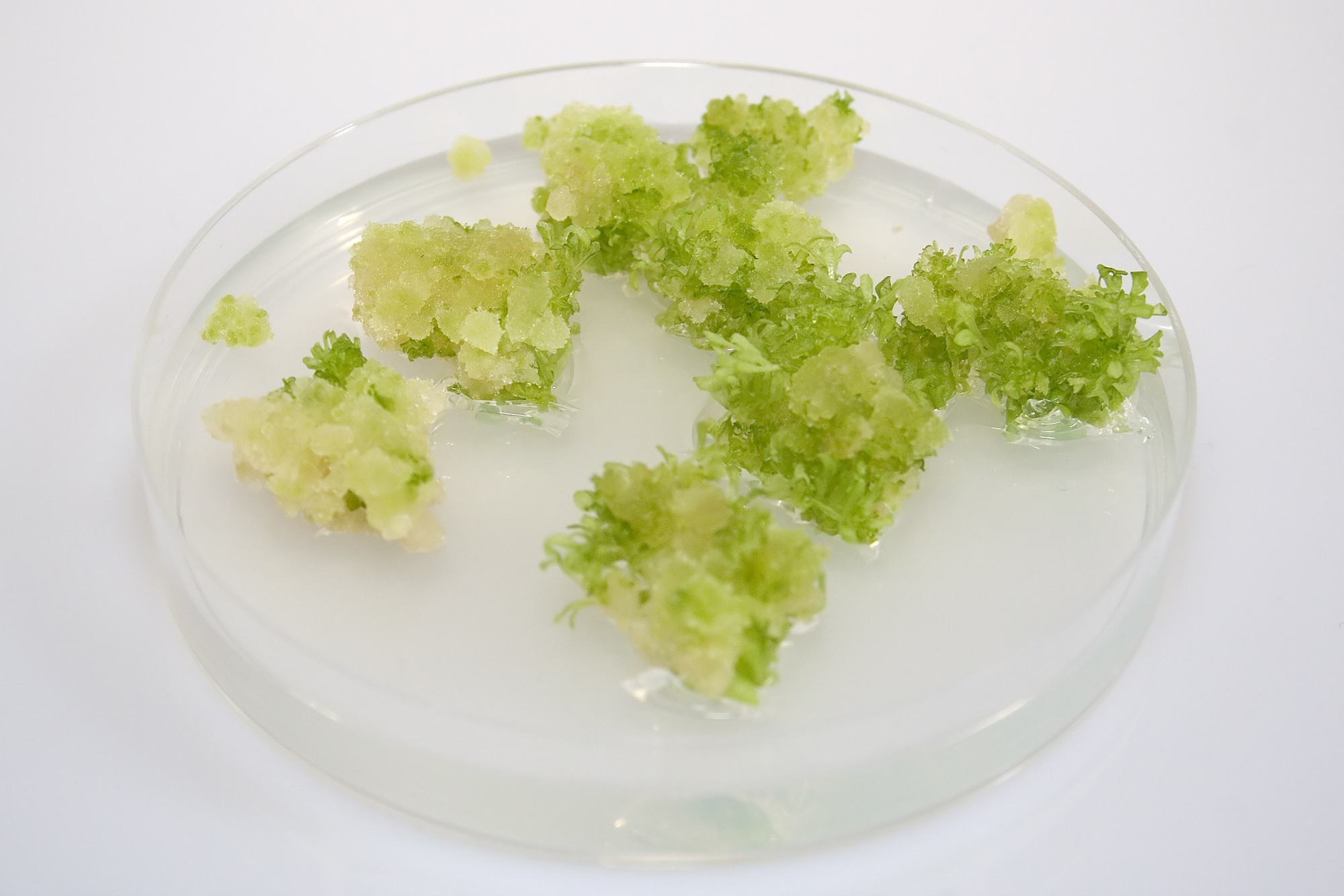
Nicotiana tabacum parenchyma cells in culture

== Callus induction and tissue culture ==
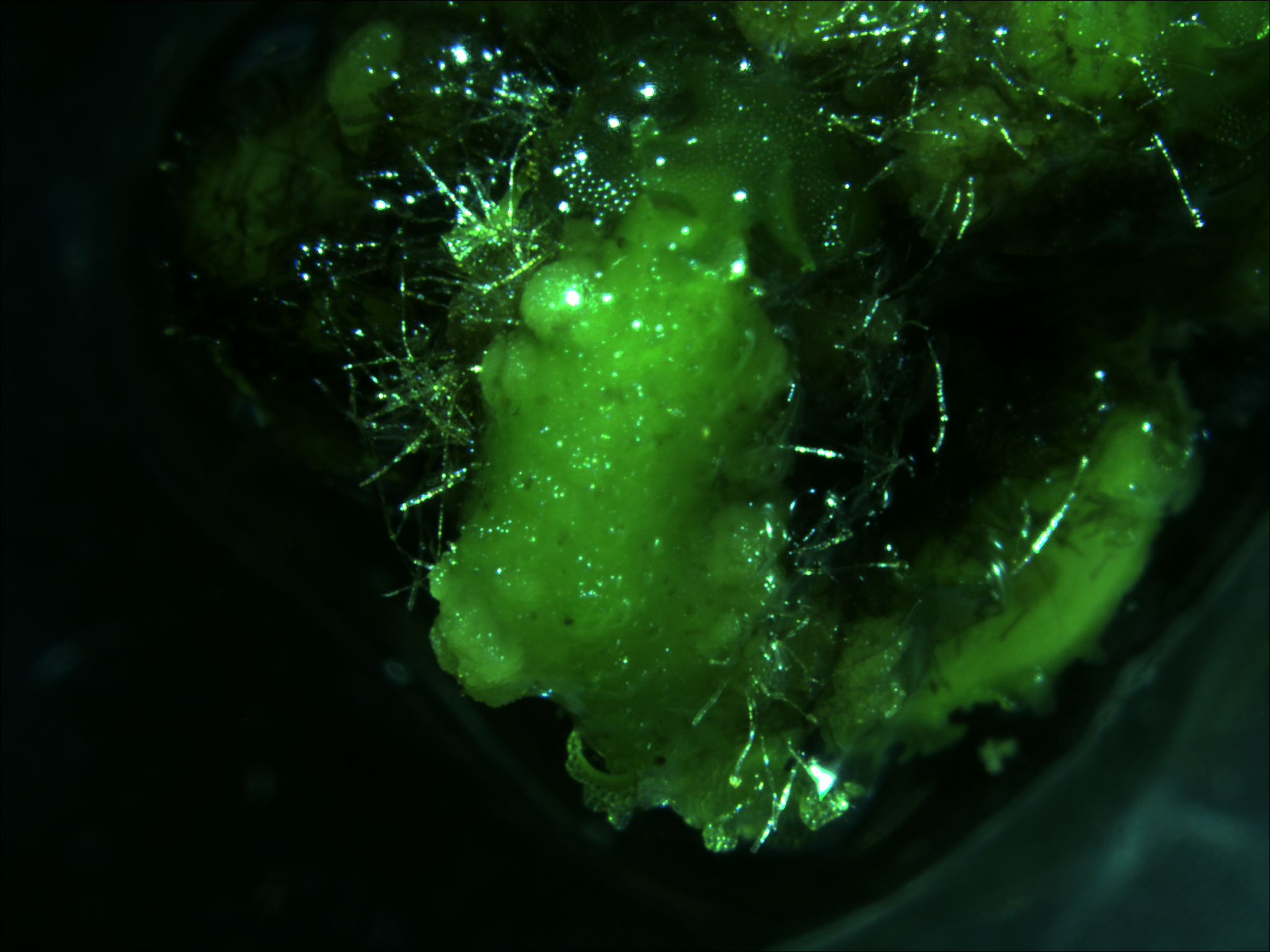
Callus cells forming during a process called "induction" in Pteris vittata

Plant species representing all major land plant groups have been shown to be capable of producing callus in tissue culture. A callus cell culture is usually sustained on gel medium. Callus induction medium consists of agar and a mixture of macronutrients and micronutrients for the given cell type. There are several types of basal salt mixtures used in plant tissue culture, but most notably modified Murashige and Skoog medium, White's medium, and woody plant medium. Vitamins, such as Gamborg B5 vitamins, are also provided to enhance growth. For plant cells, enrichment with nitrogen, phosphorus, and potassium is especially important. Plant callus is usually derived from somatic tissues. The tissues used to initiate callus formation depends on the plant species and which tissues are available for explant culture. The cells that give rise to callus and somatic embryos usually undergo rapid division or are partially undifferentiated such as meristematic tissue. In alfalfa (Medicago truncatula), however, callus and somatic embryos are derived from mesophyll cells that undergo dedifferentiation. Plant hormones are used to initiate callus growth. After the callus has formed, the concentration of hormones in the medium may be altered to shift the development from callus to root formation, shoot growth, or somatic embryogenesis. The callus tissue then undergoes further cell growth and differentiation, forming the respective organ primordia. The fully developed organs can then be used for the regeneration of new mature plants.

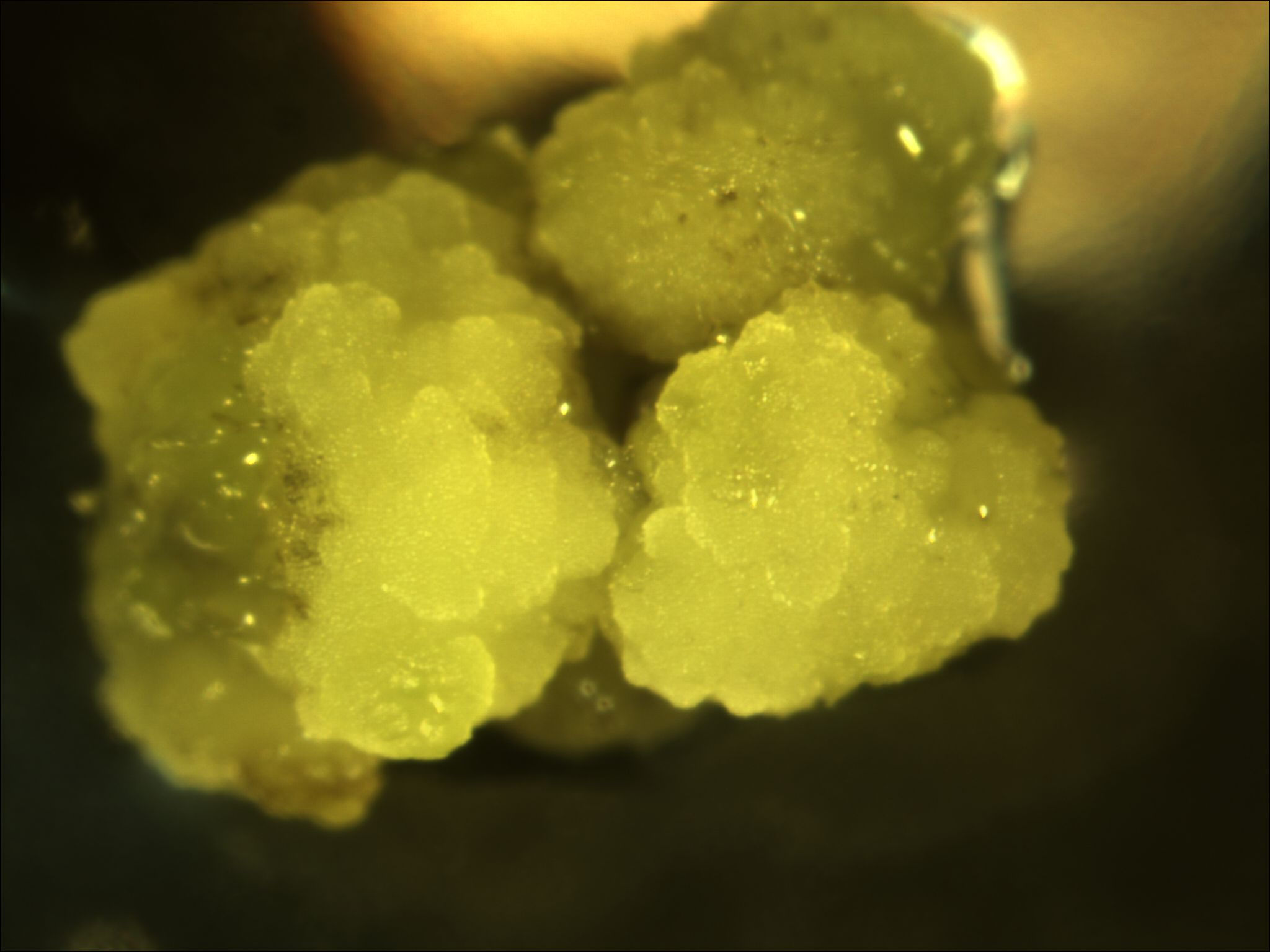
Callus induced from Pteris vittata gametophytes

== Morphology ==
Specific auxin-to-cytokinin ratios in plant tissue culture medium give rise to an unorganized growing and dividing mass of callus cells. Callus cultures are often broadly classified as being either compact or friable. Compact calli are typically green and sturdy, while friable calli are white to creamy yellow in color, fall apart easily, and can be used to generate cell suspension cultures and somatic embryos. In maize, these two callus types are designated as type I (compact) and type II (friable). Callus can directly undergo direct organogenesis and/or embryogenesis where the cells will form an entirely new plant.

== Callus cell death ==
Callus can brown and die during culture, mainly due to the oxidation of phenolic compounds. In Jatropha curcas callus cells, small organized callus cells became disorganized and varied in size after browning occurred. Browning has also been associated with oxidation and phenolic compounds in both explant tissues and explant secretions. In rice, presumably, a condition which is favorable for scutellar callus induction also induces necrosis.

== Uses ==
Callus cells are not necessarily genetically homogeneous because a callus is often made from structural tissue, not individual cells. Nevertheless, callus cells are often considered similar enough for standard scientific analysis to be performed as if on a single subject. For example, an experiment may have half a callus undergo a treatment as the experimental group, while the other half undergoes a similar but non-active treatment as the control group.

Plant calluses derived from many different cell types can differentiate into a whole plant, a process called regeneration, through addition of plant hormones to the culture medium. This ability is known as totipotency. A classical experiment by Folke Skoog and Carlos O. Miller on tobacco pith used as the starting explant shows that the supplementation of culture media by different ratios of auxin to cytokinin concentration can induce the formation of either shoots or roots – with higher auxin to cytokinin ratio, the rooting (rhizogenesis) is induced, applying equal amounts of both hormones stimulates further callus growth and changing the auxin to cytokinin ratio in favor of the cytokinin leads to the development of shoots. Regeneration of a whole plant from a single cell allows transgenics researchers to obtain whole plants which have a copy of the transgene in every cell. Regeneration of a whole plant that has some genetically transformed cells and some untransformed cells yields a chimera. In general, chimeras are not useful for genetic research or agricultural applications.

Genes can be inserted into callus cells using biolistic bombardment, also known as a gene gun, or Agrobacterium tumefaciens. Cells that receive the gene of interest can then be recovered into whole plants using a combination of plant hormones. The whole plants that are recovered can be used to experimentally determine gene function(s), or to enhance crop plant traits for modern agriculture.

Callus is of particular use in micropropagation where it can be used to grow genetically identical copies of plants with desirable characteristics. To increase the yield, efficiency and explant survivability of micropropagation, a thorough care is taken for the optimization of the micropropagation protocol. For example, using explants composed of low totipotency cells may prolong the time necessary to obtain callus of sufficient size, increasing the total length of the experiment. Similarly, various plant species and explant types require specific plant hormones for callus induction and subsequent organogenesis or embryogenesis – for the formation and growth of maize calluses, auxin 2,4-Dichlorophenoxyacetic acid (2,4-D) was superior to 1-Naphthaleneacetic acid (NAA) or Indole-3-acetic acid (IAA), while the development of callus was hindered in prune explants after applying auxin Indole-3-butyric acid (IBA) but not IAA.

== History ==
Henri-Louis Duhamel du Monceau investigated wound-healing responses in elm trees, and was the first to report formation of callus on live plants.

In 1908, E. F. Simon was able to induce callus from poplar stems that also produced roots and buds. The first reports of callus induction in vitro came from three independent researchers in 1939. P. White induced callus derived from tumor-developing procambial tissues of hybrid Nicotiana glauca that did not require hormone supplementation. Gautheret and Nobecourt were able to maintain callus cultures of carrot using auxin hormone additions.

== See also ==
- Embryo rescue
- Somatic embryogenesis
- Chimera (genetics)
- Hyperhydricity
