= Folke K. Skoog =

Swedish plant physiologist (1908–2001)

Folke Karl Skoog
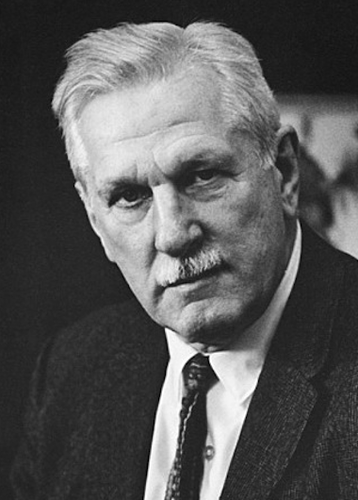
- Born: July 15, 1908; Halland, Sweden
- Died: February 15, 2001 (aged 92); Madison, Wisconsin, US
- Resting place: Uppsala old cemetery, Sweden
- Education: Caltech
- Known for: Murashige and Skoog medium
- Spouse: Birgit Skoog
- Awards: National Medal of Science (1991)
- Scientific career
- Fields: Plant physiology
- Workplaces: Caltech, Berkeley, University of Hawaiʻi, Harvard, Johns Hopkins University, Washington University in St. Louis, University of Wisconsin
- Thesis: Some Physiological Functions of the Growth Hormone in Higher Plants (1936)
- Notable students: Toshio Murashige

Folke Karl Skoog (July 15, 1908 – February 15, 2001) was a Swedish-born American plant physiologist who was a pioneer in the field of plant growth regulators, particularly cytokinins. Skoog was a recipient of the National Medal of Science 1991.

Born in Halland, Sweden, Skoog immigrated to the United States during a trip to California in 1925, and was naturalized as a citizen almost a decade later. He competed, and finished sixth in heat 2, in the 1500 meter race during the 1932 Summer Olympics. In 1936, he received his PhD in biology from Caltech for his work done with auxin, a plant hormone.

In 1937, Skoog was a postdoctoral researcher with Dennis Robert Hoagland, and his professional career advanced significantly with his arrival at the University of Wisconsin–Madison in 1947. Carlos O. Miller discovered kinetin in 1954, and benzyladenine and related compounds were later synthesized in Skoog's lab.

In 1962, Skoog and Toshio Murashige published what is probably the best-known paper in plant tissue culture. In a fruitless attempt to discover a yet-unknown plant growth regulator in tobacco juice for his doctoral thesis, Murashige instead developed a greatly improved salt-based formulation for the sterile culture of tobacco. Now referred to as Murashige and Skoog medium, the final paper (Murashige, T. and Skoog, F. (1962) A revised medium for rapid growth and bioassays with tobacco tissue cultures. Physiol Plant 18: 100-127) is one of the most often-cited papers in biology. Now, more than 60 years after the work, the MS medium remains an essential component in plant tissue culture, but not in hydroponics.

In 1970, Skoog was elected a foreign member of the Royal Swedish Academy of Sciences and in 1992, he received the ″Lifetime Achievement Award″ from the Society for In Vitro Biology (SIVB).
