= Angustmycin A =

Names
- IUPAC name 2-(6-aminopurin-9-yl)-2-(hydroxymethyl)-5-methylideneoxolane-3,4-diol
- Other names Decoyinine; 4′,5′-Didehydro-1′-C-(hydroxymethyl)adenosine

Identifiers
CAS Number	2004-04-8
3D model (JSmol)	Interactive image
ChEMBL	ChEMBL1444741
ChemSpider	108484
ECHA InfoCard	100.213.257
EC Number	687-357-1
PubChem CID	121578
CompTox Dashboard (EPA)	DTXSID50173859
- InChI: InChI=1S/C11H13N5O4/c1-5-7(18)8(19)11(2-17,20-5)16-4-15-6-9(12)13-3-14-10(6)16/h3-4,7-8,17-19H,1-2H2,(H2,12,13,14) Key: UZSSGAOAYPICBZ-UHFFFAOYSA-N
- SMILES: C=C1[C@H]([C@H]([C@](O1)(CO)N2C=NC3=C(N=CN=C32)N)O)O

Properties
Chemical formula	C_{11}H_{13}N_{5}O_{4}
Molar mass	279.256 g·mol^{−1}

Hazards
- GHS labelling
Pictograms	(GHS07: Exclamation mark)
Signal word	Warning
Hazard statements	H315, H319, H335
Precautionary statements	P261, P264, P264+P265, P271, P280, P302+P352, P304+P340, P305+P351+P338, P319, P321, P332+P317, P337+P317, P362+P364, P403+P233, P405, P501
- Except where otherwise noted, data are given for materials in their standard state (at 25 °C [77 °F], 100 kPa). Infobox references

Angustmycin A is a purine antibiotic and metabolite from Streptomyces bacteria with the molecular formula C_{11}H_{13}N_{5}O_{4}. Angustmycin A is also a cytokinin.
