= Angustmycin =

Angustmycin A

Angustmycin C

Angustmycins are bioactive nucleosides.
