= Thidiazuron =

Names
- IUPAC name 1-Phenyl-3-(1,2,3-thiadiazol-5-yl)urea
- Other names TDZ

Identifiers
CAS Number	51707-55-2
3D model (JSmol)	Interactive image
ChemSpider	6601
ECHA InfoCard	100.052.125
EC Number	257-356-7
UNII	0091WH7STF
CompTox Dashboard (EPA)	DTXSID0032651
- InChI: InChI=1/C9H8N4OS/c14-9(12-8-6-10-13-15-8)11-7-4-2-1-3-5-7/h1-6H,(H2,11,12,14)/f/h11-12H
- SMILES: C1=CC=C(C=C1)NC(NC2=CN=NS2)=O

Properties
Chemical formula	C_{9}H_{8}N_{4}OS
Molar mass	220.25 g·mol^{−1}
Appearance	White powder
- Except where otherwise noted, data are given for materials in their standard state (at 25 °C [77 °F], 100 kPa). Infobox references

Thidiazuron (TDZ) is a plant growth regulator.

== Applications ==
=== Plant growth regulator ===
The synthesis routes and their use as plant growth regulating agent were patented in the early 1980s by the German company Schering AG. Thidiazuron is taken up by the leaves and has a cytokinin-like behavior. It causes leaves to lose weight in a controlled manner prior to harvesting, without affecting the growth and maturation of the plant. This facilitates mechanical harvesting. It also accelerates the maturation process, because leaves do not block the sunlight. The plants later develop normal foliage. Thidiazuron can also be used as a herbicide, because an appropriate dose and timing of administration completely stops growth.

The product was marketed by Aventis CropScience; later merged into Bayer CropScience. Brand names are Dropp (for use in the cultivation of cotton) or Revent (for use in fruit production). Dropp Ultra, Dropp UltraMax and Ginstar are products with a mixture of thidiazuron and diuron.

=== Preservative ===
Researchers found that thidiazuron is suitable for extending the life of cut flowers. The substance slows down or prevents the wilting of the leaves.

== Regulatory ==
=== European Union ===
In 2008, the European Union banned the use of thiadiazuron in agriculture. It was one of the agricultural chemicals in the framework of the European Pesticides Directive 91/414 / EEC that must have an environmental and health assessment to obtain a new authorization. An outdated substance is an active substance which was already on the market in the European Union on July 25, 1993, before the action step of the directive. Existing stocks could still be used afterwards for one year.

Thidiazuron is still used in other parts of the world, including in the United States, Australia, and Mexico.

== Toxicology and safety ==
Thidiazuron is mildly acutely toxic, irritating to skin and eyes, and may cause respiratory irritation if inhaled.
