= 1,3-Diphenylurea =

Names
- Preferred IUPAC name N,N′-Diphenylurea
- Other names 1,3-Diphenylurea; Diphenylurea; carbanilide

Identifiers
CAS Number	102-07-8
3D model (JSmol)	Interactive image
Beilstein Reference	782650
ChEBI	CHEBI:41320
ChEMBL	ChEMBL354676
ChemSpider	7314
DrugBank	DB07496
ECHA InfoCard	100.002.731
EC Number	203-003-7
Gmelin Reference	143821
PubChem CID	7595
UNII	94YD8RMX5B
CompTox Dashboard (EPA)	DTXSID2025183
- InChI: InChI=1S/C13H12N2O/c16-13(14-11-7-3-1-4-8-11)15-12-9-5-2-6-10-12/h1-10H,(H2,14,15,16) Key: GWEHVDNNLFDJLR-UHFFFAOYSA-N
- SMILES: O=C(NC1=CC=CC=C1)NC2=CC=CC=C2

Properties
Chemical formula	C_{13}H_{12}N_{2}O
Molar mass	212.252 g·mol^{−1}
Melting point	239–241 °C (462–466 °F; 512–514 K)
Boiling point	262 °C (504 °F; 535 K)
Magnetic susceptibility (χ)	−127.5·10^{−6} cm^{3}/mol

Hazards
- GHS labelling
Pictograms	(GHS07: Exclamation mark)
Signal word	Warning
Hazard statements	H302, H312, H332
Precautionary statements	P261, P264, P270, P271, P280, P301+P312, P302+P352, P304+P312, P304+P340, P312, P322, P330, P363, P501
- Except where otherwise noted, data are given for materials in their standard state (at 25 °C [77 °F], 100 kPa). Infobox references

1,3-Diphenylurea is a phenylurea-type compound with the formula (PhNH)_{2}CO (Ph = C_{6}H_{5}). It is a colorless solid that is prepared by transamidation of urea with aniline.

DPU is a cytokinin, a type of plant hormone that induces flower development. The cytokinin effect of DPU is relatively low, but other more potent phenylurea-type cytokinins have been reported.

It was detected in coconut milk.
