= TRNA dimethylallyltransferase =

Identifiers
- EC no.: 2.5.1.75

Databases
- IntEnz: IntEnz view
- BRENDA: BRENDA entry
- ExPASy: NiceZyme view
- KEGG: KEGG entry
- MetaCyc: metabolic pathway
- PRIAM: profile
- PDB structures: RCSB PDB PDBe PDBsum
Search
- PMC: articles
- PubMed: articles
- NCBI: proteins

TRNA dimethylallyltransferase (EC 2.5.1.75, tRNA prenyltransferase, MiaA, transfer ribonucleate isopentenyltransferase, Delta2-isopentenyl pyrophosphate:tRNA-Delta2-isopentenyl transferase, Delta2-isopentenyl pyrophosphate:transfer ribonucleic acid Delta2-isopentenyltransferase) is an enzyme with systematic name dimethylallyl-diphosphate: tRNA dimethylallyltransferase. This enzyme catalyses the following chemical reaction

dimethylallyl diphosphate + tRNA $\rightleftharpoons$ diphosphate + tRNA containing 6-dimethylallyladenosine

Formerly known as tRNA isopentenyltransferase (EC 2.5.1.8), but it is now known that dimethylallyl diphosphate, rather than isopentenyl diphosphate, is the substrate.

== Structural studies ==
As of late 2007, only one structure has been solved for this class of enzymes, with the PDB accession code 2QGN.

== Literature ==
- Kline LK, Fittler F, Hall RH (1969). "N^{6}-(Δ^{2}-isopentenyl)adenosine. Biosynthesis in transfer ribonucleic acid in vitro". Biochemistry. 8 (11): 4361–4371. doi:10.1021/bi00839a021. PMID 4311031.
- Rosenbaum N, Gefter ML (1972). "Δ^{2}-Isopentenylpyrophosphate: Transfer Ribonucleic Acid Δ^{2}-Isopentenyltransferase from Escherichia coli. Purification and properties of the enzyme". J. Biol. Chem. 247 (18): 5675–5680. doi:10.1016/S0021-9258(19)44812-6. PMID 4341485.
