= Plant tissue culture =

Growing cells under lab conditions

Plant tissue culture is a collection of techniques used to maintain or grow plant cells, tissues, or organs under sterile conditions on a nutrient culture medium of a known composition. It is widely used to produce clones of a plant in a method known as micropropagation. Different techniques in plant tissue culture may offer certain advantages over traditional methods of propagation, including:

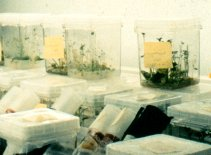
In vitro tissue culture of potato explants

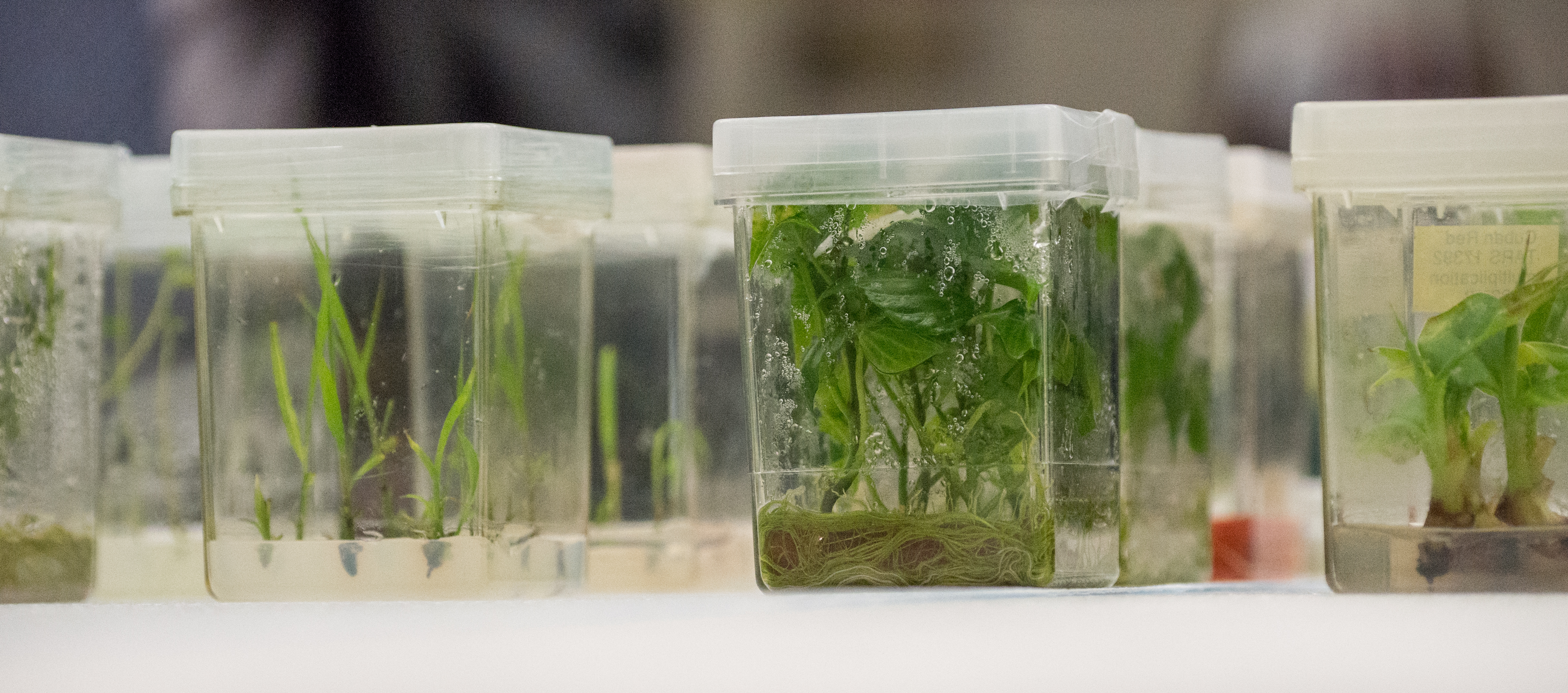
Plant tissue cultures being grown at a USDA seed bank, the National Center for Genetic Resources Preservation.

- The production of exact copies of plants that produce particularly good flowers, fruits, or other desirable traits.
- To quickly produce mature plants.
- To produce a large number of plants in a reduced space.
- The production of multiples of plants in the absence of seeds or necessary pollinators to produce seeds.
- The regeneration of whole plants from plant cells that have been genetically modified.
- The production of plants in sterile containers allows them to be moved with greatly reduced chances of transmitting diseases, pests, and pathogens.
- The production of plants from seeds that otherwise have very low chances of germinating and growing, e.g., orchids and Nepenthes.
- To clean particular plants of viral and other infections and to quickly multiply these plants as 'cleaned stock' for horticulture and agriculture.
- Reproduce recalcitrant plants required for land restoration
- Storage of genetic plant material to safeguard native plant species.

Plant tissue culture relies on the fact that many plant parts have the ability to regenerate into a whole plant (cells of those regenerative plant parts are called totipotent cells which can differentiate into various specialized cells). Single cells, plant cells without cell walls (protoplasts), pieces of leaves, stems or roots can often be used to generate a new plant on culture media given the required nutrients and plant hormones.

== Techniques used for plant tissue culture in vitro ==
Preparation of plant tissue for tissue culture is performed under aseptic conditions under HEPA filtered air provided by a laminar flow cabinet. Thereafter, the tissue is grown in sterile containers, such as Petri dishes or flasks in a growth room with controlled temperature and light intensity. Living plant materials from the environment are naturally contaminated on their surfaces (and sometimes interiors) with microorganisms, so their surfaces are sterilized in chemical solutions (usually alcohol and sodium or calcium hypochlorite) before suitable samples (known as explants) are taken. The sterile explants are then usually placed on the surface of a sterile solid culture medium but are sometimes placed directly into a sterile liquid medium, particularly when cell suspension cultures are desired. Solid and liquid media are generally composed of inorganic salts plus a few organic nutrients, vitamins, and plant hormones. Solid media are prepared from liquid media with the addition of a gelling agent, usually purified agar.

The composition of the medium, particularly the plant hormones and the nitrogen source (nitrate versus ammonium salts or amino acids) have profound effects on the morphology of the tissues that grow from the initial explant. For example, an excess of auxin will often result in a proliferation of roots, while an excess of cytokinin may yield shoots. A balance of both auxin and cytokinin will often produce an unorganised growth of cells, or callus, but the morphology of the outgrowth will depend on the plant species as well as the medium composition. As cultures grow, pieces are typically sliced off and subcultured onto new media to allow for growth or to alter the morphology of the culture. The skill and experience of the tissue culturist are important in judging which pieces to culture and which to discard.

As shoots emerge from a culture, they may be sliced off and rooted with auxin to produce plantlets which, when mature, can be transferred to potting soil for further growth in the greenhouse as normal plants.

== Regeneration pathways ==
The specific differences in the regeneration potential of different organs and explants have various explanations. The significant factors include differences in the stage of the cells in the cell cycle, the availability of or ability to transport endogenous growth regulators, and the metabolic capabilities of the cells. The most commonly used tissue explants are the meristematic ends of the plants like the stem tip, axillary bud tip, and root tip. These tissues have high rates of cell division and either concentrate or produce required growth-regulating substances including auxins and cytokinins.

Shoot regeneration efficiency in tissue culture is usually a quantitative trait that often varies between plant species and within a plant species among subspecies, varieties, cultivars, or ecotypes. Therefore, tissue culture regeneration can become complicated especially when many regeneration procedures have to be developed for different genotypes within the same species.

The three common pathways of plant tissue culture regeneration are propagation from preexisting meristems (shoot culture or nodal culture), organogenesis, and non-zygotic embryogenesis.

The propagation of shoots or nodal segments is usually performed in four stages for mass production of plantlets through in vitro vegetative multiplication but organogenesis is a standard method of micropropagation that involves tissue regeneration of adventitious organs or axillary buds directly or indirectly from the explants. Non-zygotic embryogenesis is a noteworthy developmental pathway that is highly comparable to that of zygotic embryos and it is an important pathway for producing somaclonal variants, developing artificial seeds, and synthesizing metabolites. Due to the single-cell origin of non-zygotic embryos, they are preferred in several regeneration systems for micropropagation, ploidy manipulation, gene transfer, and synthetic seed production. Nonetheless, tissue regeneration via organogenesis has also proved to be advantageous for studying regulatory mechanisms of plant development.

== Choice of explant ==
The tissue obtained from a plant to be cultured is called an explant.

Explants can be taken from many different parts of a plant, including portions of shoots, leaves, stems, flowers, roots, single undifferentiated cells, and from many types of mature cells provided they still contain living cytoplasm and nuclei and are able to de-differentiate and resume cell division. This has given rise to the concept of totipotency of plant cells. However, this is not true for all cells or for all plants. In many species explants of various organs vary in their rates of growth and regeneration, while some do not grow at all. The choice of explant material also determines if the plantlets developed via tissue culture are haploid or diploid. Also, the risk of microbial contamination is increased with inappropriate explants.

The first method involving the meristems and induction of multiple shoots is the preferred method for the micropropagation industry since the risks of somaclonal variation (genetic variation induced in tissue culture) are minimal when compared to the other two methods. Somatic embryogenesis is a method that has the potential to be several times higher in multiplication rates and is amenable to handling in liquid culture systems like bioreactors.

Some explants, like the root tip, are hard to isolate and are contaminated with soil microflora that becomes problematic during the tissue culture process. Certain soil microflora can form tight associations with the root systems, or even grow within the root. Soil particles bound to roots are difficult to remove without injury to the roots that then allows a microbial attack. These associated microflora will generally overgrow the tissue culture medium before there is significant growth of plant tissue.

Some cultured tissues are slow in their growth. For them there would be two options: (i) Optimizing the culture medium; (ii) Culturing highly responsive tissues or varieties. Necrosis can spoil cultured tissues. Generally, plant varieties differ in susceptibility to tissue culture necrosis. Thus, by culturing highly responsive varieties (or tissues) it can be managed.

Aerial (above soil) explants are also rich in undesirable microflora. However, they are more easily removed from the explant by gentle rinsing, and the remainder usually can be killed by surface sterilization. Most of the surface microflora do not form tight associations with the plant tissue. Such associations can usually be found by visual inspection as a mosaic, de-colorization, or localized necrosis on the surface of the explant.

An alternative for obtaining uncontaminated explants is to take explants from seedlings which are aseptically grown from surface-sterilized seeds. The hard surface of the seed is less permeable to the penetration of harsh surface sterilizing agents, such as hypochlorite, so the acceptable conditions of sterilization used for seeds can be much more stringent than for vegetative tissues.

Tissue-cultured plants are clones. If the original mother plant used to produce the first explants is susceptible to a pathogen or environmental condition, the entire crop would be susceptible to the same problem. Conversely, any positive traits would remain within the line also.

== Applications of plant tissue culture ==
Plant tissue culture is used widely in the plant sciences, forestry, and horticulture. Applications include:

- The commercial production of plants used as potting, landscape, and florist subjects, which uses meristem and shoot culture to produce large numbers of identical individuals.
- To conserve rare or endangered plant species.
- A plant breeder may use tissue culture to screen cells rather than plants for advantageous characters, e.g. herbicide resistance/tolerance, detection of chimeras at an early developmental stage.
- Large-scale growth of plant cells in liquid culture in bioreactors for production of valuable compounds, like plant-derived secondary metabolites and recombinant proteins used as biopharmaceuticals.
- To cross distantly related species by protoplast fusion and regeneration of the novel hybrid.
- To rapidly study the molecular basis for physiological, biochemical, and reproductive mechanisms in plants, for example in vitro selection for stress-tolerant plants.
- To cross-pollinate distantly related species and then tissue culture the resulting embryo which would otherwise normally die (Embryo Rescue).
- For chromosome doubling and induction of polyploidy, for example doubled haploids, tetraploids, and other forms of polyploids. This is usually achieved by the application of antimitotic agents such as colchicine or oryzalin.
- As a tissue for transformation, followed by either short-term testing of genetic constructs or regeneration of transgenic plants.
- Certain techniques such as meristem tip culture can be used to produce clean plant material from virused stock, such as sugarcane, potatoes and many species of soft fruit.
- Production of identical sterile hybrid species can be obtained.
- Large scale production of artificial seeds through somatic embryogenesis

=== Examples ===
Developing Somaclonal variation

Plant	Somaclonal variant	Traits
Sugarcane	'Ono'	resistance to Fiji disease.
Citronella java	'Bio-13' (by CIMAP , Lucknow)	37% more oil

Climate resilience

- As in Kaveri Vaman (by NRCB , Tamil Nadu) , a Tissue Culture Banana Mutant to withstand heavy rains.

Secondary metabolites production

- Such as caffeine from Coffea arabica, nicotine from Nicotiana rustica or phenolic acids from Echinacea purpurea.

Induction of flowering

- In trees with delay in flowering or bamboo - where some species flower once in their life but may live longer than 50 years.

== See also ==
- Hairy root culture
- Photoautotrophic tissue culture
- Gottlieb Haberlandt, pioneer of plant tissue culture
- Frederick Campion Steward, pioneer and 'champion' of plant tissue culture
- Murashige and Skoog medium and Hoagland solution, important plant growth media
- Plant physiology
