= Photoautotrophic tissue culture =

Microorganism culture depending on photosynthesis rather than feeding on sugar

Photoautotrophic tissue culture is defined as "micropropagation without sugar in the culture medium, in which the growth or accumulation of carbohydrates of cultures is dependent fully upon photosynthesis and inorganic nutrient uptake".

There are multiple advantages to using this form of propagation, because this system actively encourages plant growth. Namely, there are lower contamination rates due to the lack of sugar in the growing medium, and more catering to plants that aren't able to be successfully multiplied by conventional means. Many plants have trouble being propagated to due physiological or morphological inhibitions that make root formation difficult from cuttings. And after the plantlet develops in vitro, then the ex-planting process can often be very stressful and result in plant death, which isn't a problem for pre-acclimated plantlets grown via photoautotrophic tissue culture (In this context, pre-acclimated refers to plantlets that have developed a cuticle and have been cultivated in an open air system as opposed to the closed system seen in typical operations).

== History and Development of Photoautotrophic tissue culture ==
A light-dependent reaction was observed in that a decrease in the available CO_{2} was found after the light switch in sealed containers used in conventional tissue culture. This led to the idea that plants, even in vitro, are capable of actively producing sugars via photosynthesis and this idea was quickly tested and validated using potato and strawberry in 1988.

=== Pros and Cons of Photoautotrophic tissue culture ===
Major limitations inhibit the widespread adoption of this methodology. Namely, there is a more stringent environmental maintenance that needs to be practiced. Proper ventilation, temperature regulation, CO_{2} concentration, and avoiding contamination are some of the hardest hurdles to overcome if resources are limiting. Generally speaking, temperature and light are already going to be standards of control practiced in micropropagation. However, ventilation and CO_{2} concentration become a challenge, especially while trying to maintain sterile conditions (even though if there is no sugar in the growing medium, aseptic technique is still an essential practice that is required to avoid contamination).

=== Current use of the Technology ===
As of 2016 a number of genera have been found to be well-suited to this form of micro propagation. Many researchers have adopted aspects of this type of propagation for certain projects by integrating ventilated lids or altering light intensity and sugar content in media, but only select few genera have been fully employed in a micro propagation project using this technology. They include Gerbera, Dendrobium, Hypericum, Momordica, Myrtus, Canna, Billbergia, Neoregelia, Solanum, Capsicum, Dioscorea, Saccharum, Pfaffia, and Cocos.

This list isn't truly comprehensive, and there are many more where this system has been employed. However these genera are subject to complete protocol establishment and have known sources in the scientific community. for the most part these systems are establishment for ease of germplasm exchange, increased production, or to test a new form of propagating a given genus.

=== Use of Gas-Permeable Membrane Discs and Forced Ventilation ===
By using permeable discs as lids, air diffusion within the culture vessel can be improved. This will in turn allow for increased carbon dioxide concentrations during 'day' periods and less water vapor in the container which encourages transpiration. These combined features have an overall effect of enhancing photosynthesis, increasing growth rate, and shortening production time.

Using forced ventilation tubules within the culture vessels was developed after the idea of using the discs, as a way to ensure that uniform content of water vapor and carbon dioxide is within each individual container. This ensures uniform growth habit and less fringe effects.
