= Murashige and Skoog medium =

Growth medium used in plant cell culture

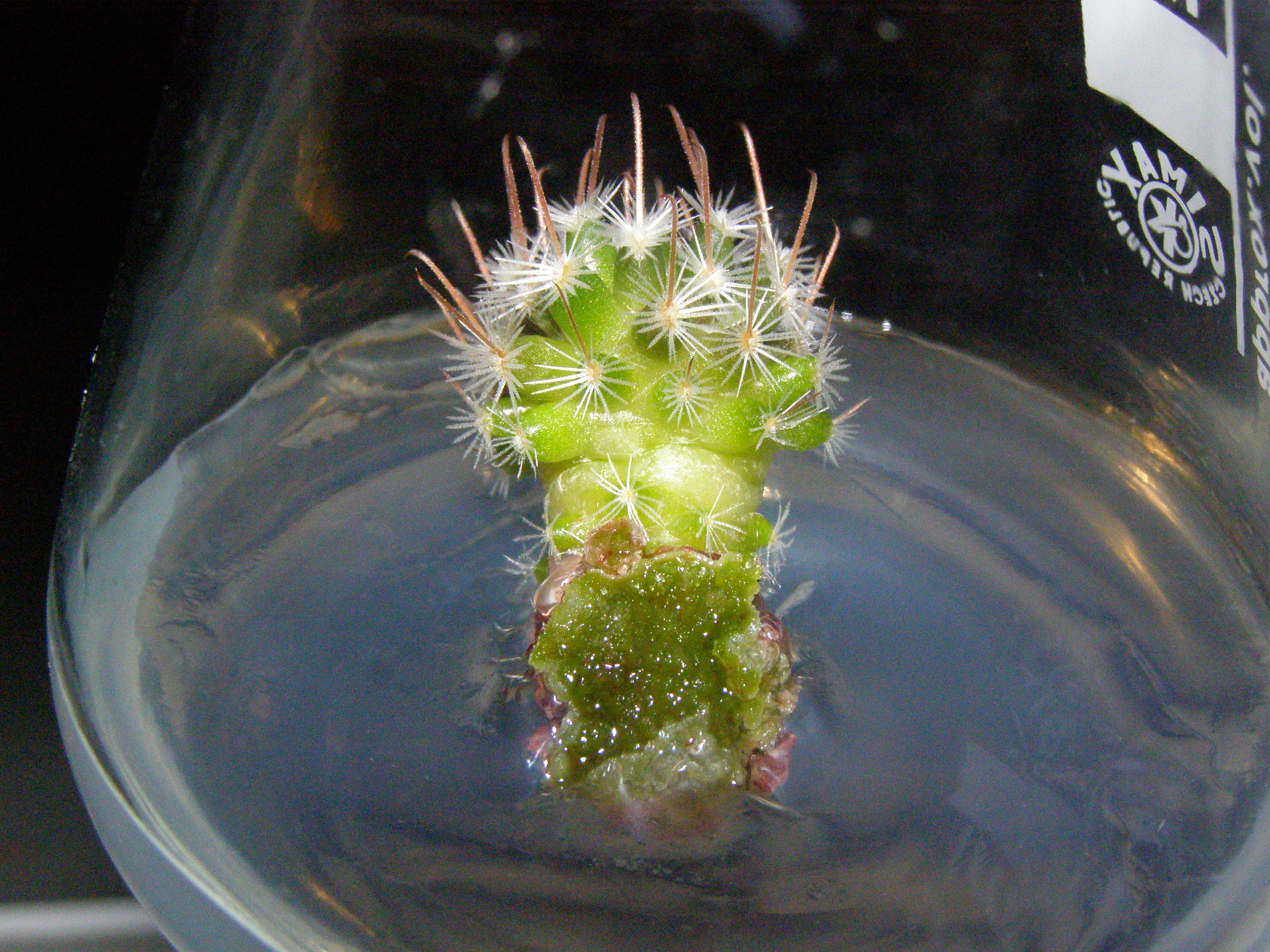
Mammillaria sp. on MS media in agar

Murashige and Skoog medium (or MSO or MS0 (MS-zero)) is the most popular plant growth medium used in the laboratories worldwide for cultivation of plant cell culture on agar.

== History ==
MS0 was invented by plant scientists Toshio Murashige and Folke K. Skoog in 1962 during Murashige's search for a new plant growth regulator. A number after the letters MS is used to indicate the sucrose concentration of the medium. For example, MS0 contains no sucrose and MS20 contains 20 g/L sucrose. Along with its modifications, it is the most commonly used medium in plant tissue culture experiments in the laboratory.

As Skoog's doctoral student, Murashige originally set out to find an as-yet undiscovered growth hormone present in tobacco juice. No such component was discovered; instead, analysis of juiced tobacco and ashed tobacco revealed higher concentrations of specific minerals in plant tissues than were previously known. A series of experiments demonstrated that varying the levels of these inorganic nutrients enhanced growth substantially over existing formulations. It was determined that nitrogen in particular enhanced growth of tobacco in tissue culture.

According to recent scientific findings, however, MS medium is not suitable as a nutrient solution for deep water culture (hydroponics). Organic compounds including vitamins are not required for normal plant nutrition.

== Ingredients ==
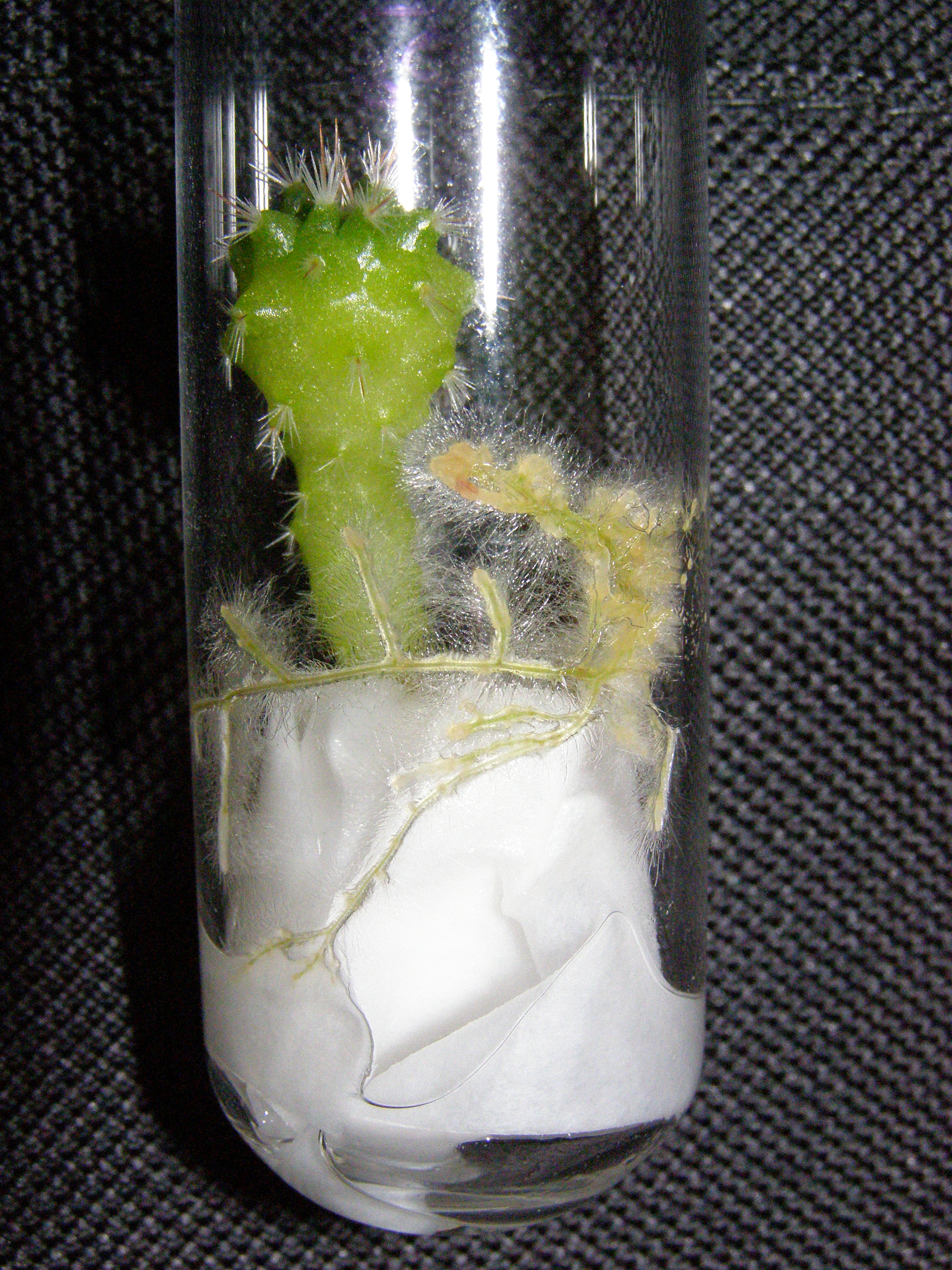
Mammillaria miegiana on liquid MS media

Major salts (macronutrients)

- Ammonium nitrate (NH_{4}NO_{3}) 1650 mg/l
- Calcium chloride (CaCl_{2} · 2H_{2}O) 440 mg/l
- Magnesium sulfate (MgSO_{4} · 7H_{2}O) 370 mg/l
- Monopotassium phosphate (KH_{2}PO_{4}) 170 mg/l
- Potassium nitrate (KNO_{3}) 1900 mg/l

Minor salts (micronutrients)

- Boric acid (H_{3}BO_{3}) 6. 2 mg/l
- Cobalt chloride (CoCl_{2} · 6H_{2}O) 0.025 mg/l
- Ferrous sulfate (FeSO_{4} · 7H_{2}O) 27.8 mg/l
- Manganese(II) sulfate (MnSO_{4} · 4H_{2}O) 22.3 mg/l
- Potassium iodide (KI) 0.83 mg/l
- Sodium molybdate (Na_{2}MoO_{4} · 2H_{2}O) 0.25 mg/l
- Zinc sulfate (ZnSO_{4}·7H_{2}O) 8.6 mg/l
- Ethylenediaminetetraacetic acid sodium salt dihydrate (NaEDTA · 2H_{2}O) 36.70 mg/L
- Copper sulfate (CuSO_{4} · 5H_{2}O) 0.025 mg/l

Vitamins and organic compounds

- Myo-Inositol 100 mg/l
- Nicotinic acid 0.5 mg/l
- Pyridoxine · HCl 0.5 mg/l
- Thiamine · HCl 0.1 mg/l
- Glycine 2 mg/l
- Tryptone 1 g/l (optional)
- Indole acetic acid 1–30 mg/l (optional)
- Kinetin 0.04–10 mg/l (optional)

== See also ==
- Hoagland solution – Hydroponic nutrient solution
- Long Ashton Research Station – Former agricultural research centre in Somerset
