= Toshio Murashige =

Japanese botanist

Toshio Murashige is a professor emeritus of University of California Riverside in plant biology.

He is most widely known for his efforts in creating the plant tissue culture medium known as Murashige and Skoog medium.
