= Zeatin =

Names
- IUPAC name (E)-2-methyl-4-(7H-purin-6-ylamino)but-2-en-1-ol

Identifiers
CAS Number	1637-39-4
3D model (JSmol)	Interactive image
ChEBI	CHEBI:16522
ChemSpider	395716
PubChem CID	449093
UNII	7I6OOJ9GR6
CompTox Dashboard (EPA)	DTXSID10859662
- InChI: InChI=1S/C10H13N5O/c1-7(4-16)2-3-11-9-8-10(13-5-12-8)15-6-14-9/h2,5-6,16H,3-4H2,1H3,(H2,11,12,13,14,15)/b7-2+ Key: UZKQTCBAMSWPJD-FARCUNLSSA-N; InChI=1/C10H13N5O/c1-7(4-16)2-3-11-9-8-10(13-5-12-8)15-6-14-9/h2,5-6,16H,3-4H2,1H3,(H2,11,12,13,14,15)/b7-2+ Key: UZKQTCBAMSWPJD-FARCUNLSBM
- SMILES: C/C(=C\CNC1=NC=NC2=C1NC=N2)/CO

Properties
Chemical formula	C_{10}H_{13}N_{5}O
Molar mass	219.248 g·mol^{−1}
Appearance	Off-white to yellow crystalline powder
Melting point	208 to 210 °C (406 to 410 °F; 481 to 483 K)
Solubility in 1M NaOH	Soluble

Hazards
- Lethal dose or concentration (LD, LC)
LD_{50} (median dose)	2200 mg/kg (mouse, transperitoneal)
- Except where otherwise noted, data are given for materials in their standard state (at 25 °C [77 °F], 100 kPa). verify (what is ?) Infobox references

Zeatin is a cytokinin derived from adenine, which occurs in the form of a cis- and a trans-isomer and conjugates. Zeatin was discovered in immature corn kernels from the genus Zea. It promotes growth of lateral buds and when sprayed on meristems stimulates cell division to produce bushier plants.

== Occurrence ==
Zeatin and its derivatives occur in many plant extracts and are the active ingredient in coconut milk, which causes plant growth.

6-(γ,γ-Dimethylallylamino)purine is a zeatin precursor.

== Application ==
Zeatin has a variety of effects including:

1. Promotes callus initiation when combined with auxin, concentration 1 ppm.
2. Promotes fruit set. Zeatin 100 ppm + GA3 500 ppm + NAA 20 ppm, sprayed at 10th, 25th, 40th day after blossom.
3. Delays yellowing for vegetables, 20 ppm, sprayed.
4. Causes auxiliary stems to grow and flower.

Zeatin can also be applied to stimulate seed germination and seedling growth.

Zeatin has also been shown to promote the resistance of tobacco against the bacterial pathogen Pseudomonas syringae, in which trans-zeatin has a more prominent effect than cis-zeatin.

The two isomers of Zeatin are found to have different effects biologically, as trans-zeatin is found to be bioactive while cis-zeatin has a weak impact. This distinct bioactivity is not a result of difference in uptake and accumulation of trans-Zeatin as opposed to cis-Zeatin. In the tobacco callus bioassay, cis-Zeatin was found to be less active than trans-Zeatin. There is no evidence of cis↔trans isomerization in plant tissues.
