= Cytokinin =

Class of plant hormones promoting cell division

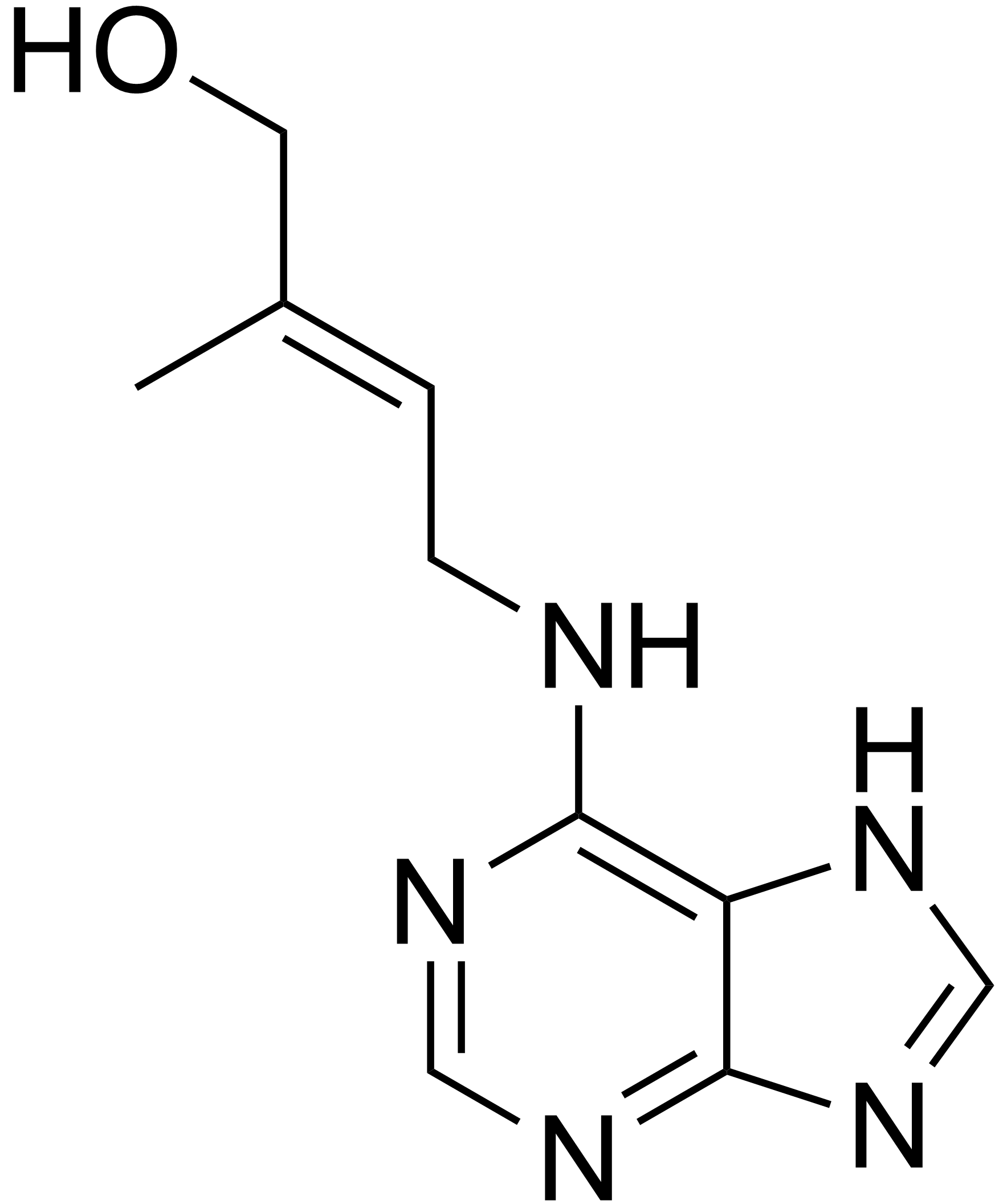
The cytokinin zeatin is named after the genus of corn, Zea.

Cytokinins (CK) are a class of plant hormones that promote cell division, or cytokinesis, in plant roots and shoots. They are involved primarily in cell growth and differentiation, but also affect apical dominance, axillary bud growth, and leaf senescence.

There are two types of cytokinins: adenine-type cytokinins represented by kinetin, zeatin, and 6-benzylaminopurine, and phenylurea-type cytokinins like diphenylurea and thidiazuron (TDZ). Most adenine-type cytokinins are synthesized in roots. Cambium and other actively dividing tissues also synthesize cytokinins. No phenylurea cytokinins have been found in plants. Cytokinins participate in local and long-distance signalling, with the same transport mechanism as purines and nucleosides. Typically, cytokinins are transported in the xylem.

Cytokinins act in concert with auxin, another plant growth hormone. The two are complementary, having generally opposite effects.

== History ==
The idea of specific substances required for cell division to occur in plants actually dates back to the Swiss physiologist J. Wiesner, who, in 1892, proposed that initiation of cell division is evoked by endogenous factors, specifically a proper balance among them. Austrian plant physiologist, G. Haberlandt, reported in 1913 that an unknown substance diffuses from the phloem tissue which can induce cell division in the parenchymatic tissue of potato tubers. In 1941, Johannes Van Overbeek found that the milky endosperm of immature coconut also had this factor, which stimulated cell division and differentiation in very young Datura embryos.

Jablonski and Skoog (1954) extended the work of Haberlandt and reported that a substance present in the vascular tissue was responsible for causing cell division in the sith cells. Miller and his co-workers (1954) isolated and purified the cell division substance in crystallised form from autoclaved herring fish sperm DNA. This active compound was named as kinetin because of its ability to promote cell division and was the first cytokinin to be named. Kinetin was later identified to be 6-furfuryl-amino purine. Later on, the generic name kinin was suggested to include kinetin and other substances having similar properties.

The first naturally occurring cytokinin was isolated and crystallised simultaneously by Miller and D.S. Lethum (1963–65) from the milky endosperm of corn (Zea mays) and named zeatin. Lethem (1963) proposed the term cytokinins for such substances.

== Function ==
Cytokinins are involved in many plant processes, including cell division and shoot and root morphogenesis. They are known to regulate axillary bud growth and apical dominance. According to the "direct inhibition hypothesis", these effects result from the ratio of cytokinin to auxin. This theory states that auxin from apical buds travels down shoots to inhibit axillary bud growth. This promotes shoot growth, and restricts lateral branching. Cytokinin moves from the roots into the shoots, eventually signaling lateral bud growth. Simple experiments support this theory. When the apical bud is removed, the axillary buds are uninhibited, lateral growth increases, and plants become bushier. Applying auxin to the cut stem again inhibits lateral dominance. Moreover, it has been shown that cytokinin alone has no effect on parenchyma cells. When cultured with auxin but no cytokinin, they grow large but do not divide. When cytokinin and auxin are both added together, the cells expand and differentiate. When cytokinin and auxin are present in equal levels, the parenchyma cells form an undifferentiated callus. A higher ratio of cytokinin induces growth of shoot buds, while a higher ratio of auxin induces root formation.

Cytokinins have been shown to slow aging of plant organs by preventing protein breakdown, activating protein synthesis, and assembling nutrients from nearby tissues. A study that regulated leaf senescence in tobacco leaves found that wild-type leaves yellowed while transgenic leaves remained mostly green. It was hypothesized that cytokinin may affect enzymes that regulate protein synthesis and degradation.

Cytokinins have recently been found to play a role in plant pathogenesis. For example, cytokinins have been described to induce resistance against Pseudomonas syringae in Arabidopsis thaliana and Nicotiana tabacum. Also in context of biological control of plant diseases cytokinins seem to have potential functions. Production of cytokinins by Pseudomonas fluorescens G20-18 has been identified as a key determinant to efficiently control the infection of A. thaliana with P. syringae..

While cytokinin action in vascular plants is described as pleiotropic, this class of plant hormones specifically induces the transition from apical growth to growth via a three-faced apical cell in moss protonema. This bud induction can be pinpointed to differentiation of a specific single cell, and thus is a very specific effect of cytokinin.

== Mode of action ==
Cytokinin signaling in plants is mediated by a two-component phosphorelay. This pathway is initiated by cytokinin binding to a histidine kinase receptor in the endoplasmic reticulum membrane. This results in the autophosphorylation of the receptor, with the phosphate then being transferred to a phosphotransfer protein. The phosphotransfer proteins can then phosphorylate the type-B response regulators (RR) which are a family of transcriptions factors. The phosphorylated, and thus activated, type-B RRs regulate the transcription of numerous genes, including the type-A RRs. The type-A RRs negatively regulate the pathway.

== Biosynthesis ==
Adenosine phosphate-isopentenyltransferase (IPT) catalyses the first reaction in the biosynthesis of isoprene cytokinins. It may use ATP, ADP, or AMP as substrates and may use dimethylallyl pyrophosphate (DMAPP) or hydroxymethylbutenyl pyrophosphate (HMBPP) as prenyl donors. This reaction is the rate-limiting step in cytokinin biosynthesis. DMADP and HMBDP used in cytokinin biosynthesis are produced by the methylerythritol phosphate pathway (MEP).

Cytokinins can also be produced by recycled tRNAs in plants and bacteria. tRNAs with anticodons that start with a uridine and carrying an already-prenylated adenosine adjacent to the anticodon release on degradation the adenosine as a cytokinin. The prenylation of these adenines is carried out by tRNA-isopentenyltransferase.

Auxin is known to regulate the biosynthesis of cytokinin.

== Uses ==
Because cytokinins promote plant cell division and growth, they have been studied since the 1970s as potential agrochemicals, however they have yet to be widely adopted, probably due to the complex nature of their effects. One study found that applying cytokinin to cotton seedlings led to a 5–10% increase in yield under drought conditions. Some cytokinins are utilized in tissue culture of plants and can also be used to promote the germination of seeds.
