= Plant perception (physiology) =

Plants interaction to environment

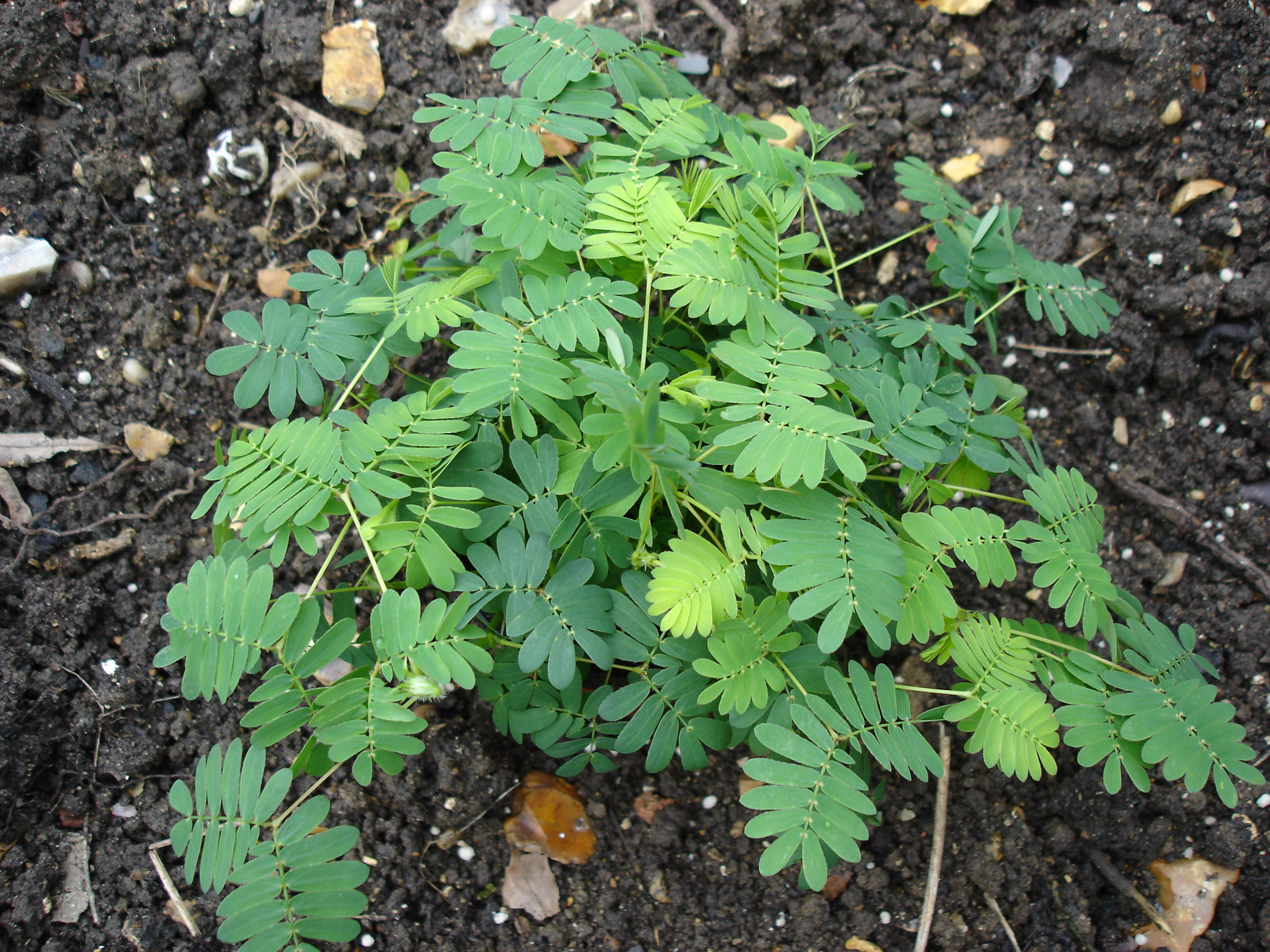

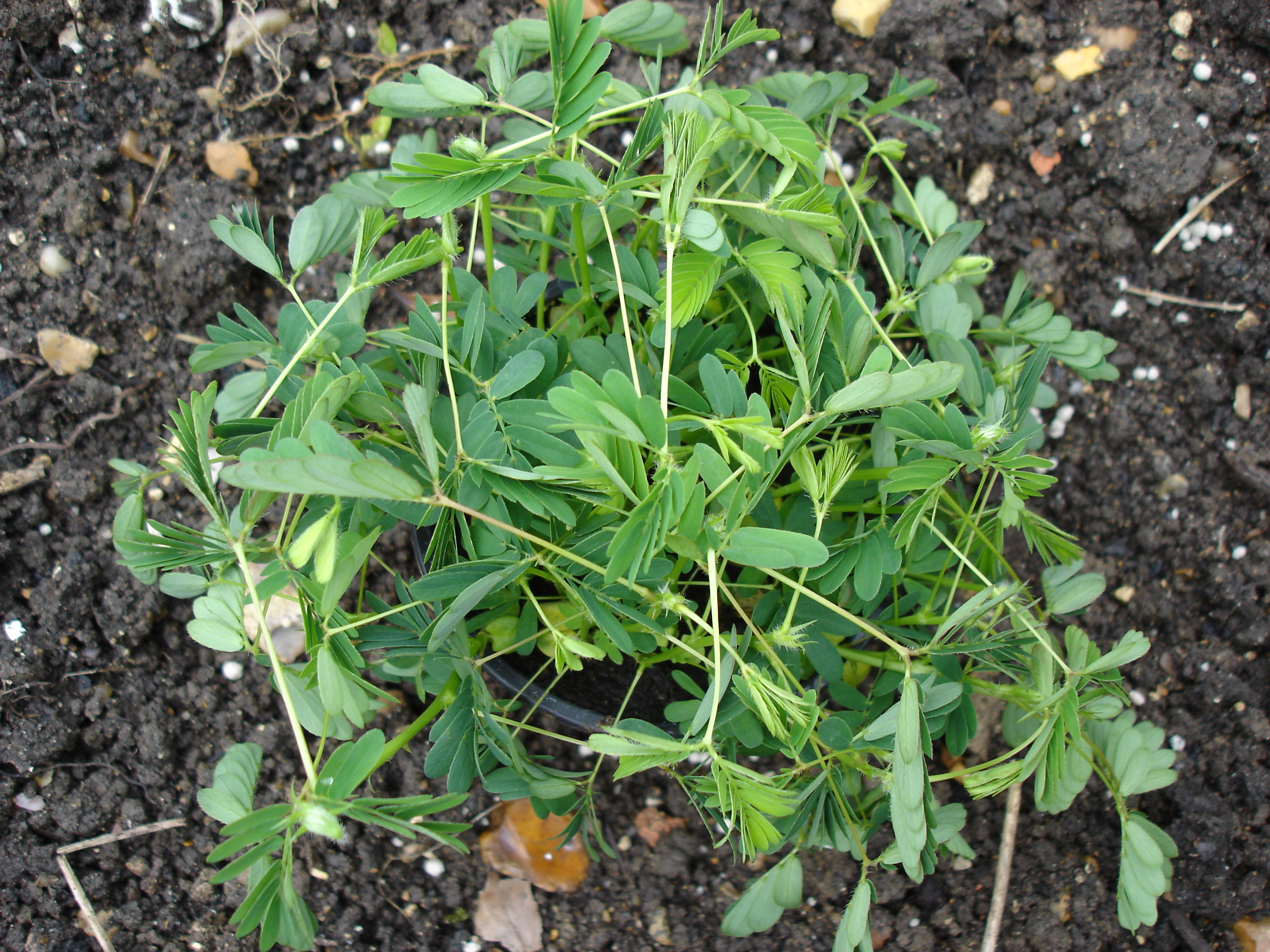
The leaf closing after touch in Mimosa pudica depends on electrical signals.

Plant perception is the ability of plants to sense and respond to the environment by adjusting their morphology and physiology. Botanical research has revealed that plants are capable of reacting to a broad range of stimuli, including chemicals, gravity, light, moisture, infections, temperature, oxygen and carbon dioxide concentrations, parasite infestation, disease, physical disruption, sound, and touch. The scientific study of plant perception is informed by numerous disciplines, such as plant physiology, ecology, and molecular biology.

== Aspects of perception ==
=== Light ===
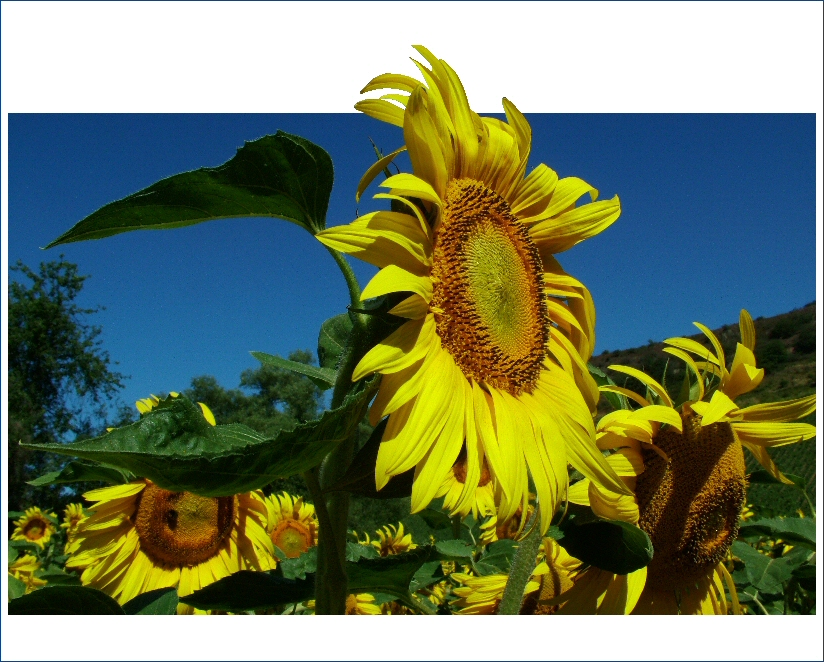
The sunflower, a common heliotropic plant which perceives and reacts to sunlight by slow turning movement

Many plant organs contain photoreceptors (phototropins, cryptochromes, and phytochromes), each of which reacts very specifically to certain wavelengths of light. These light sensors tell the plant if it is day or night, how long the day is, how much light is available, and where the light is coming from. Shoots generally grow towards light, while roots grow away from it, responses known as phototropism and skototropism, respectively. They are brought about by light-sensitive pigments like phototropins and phytochromes and the plant hormone auxin.

Many plants exhibit certain behaviors at specific times of the day; For example, flowers that open only in the mornings. Plants keep track of the time of day with a circadian clock. This internal clock is synchronized with solar time every day using sunlight, temperature, and other cues, similar to the biological clocks present in other organisms. The internal clock coupled with the ability to perceive light also allows plants to measure the time of the day and so determine the season of the year. This is how many plants know when to flower (see photoperiodism). The seeds of many plants sprout only after they are exposed to light. This response is carried out by phytochrome signalling. Plants are also able to sense the quality of light and respond appropriately. For example, in low light conditions, plants produce more photosynthetic pigments. If the light is very bright or if the levels of harmful ultraviolet radiation increase, plants produce more of their protective pigments that act as sunscreens.

Studies on the vine Boquila trifoliata has raised questions on the mode by which they are able to perceive and mimic the shape of the leaves of the plant upon which they climb. Experiments have shown that they even mimic the shape of plastic leaves when trained on them. Suggestions have even been made that plants might have a form of vision.

=== Gravity ===
To orient themselves correctly, plants must be able to sense the direction of gravity. The subsequent response is known as gravitropism.

In roots, gravity is sensed and translated in the root tip, which then grows by elongating in the direction of gravity. In shoots, growth occurs in the opposite direction, a phenomenon known as negative gravitropism. Poplar stems can detect reorientation and inclination (equilibrioception) through gravitropism.

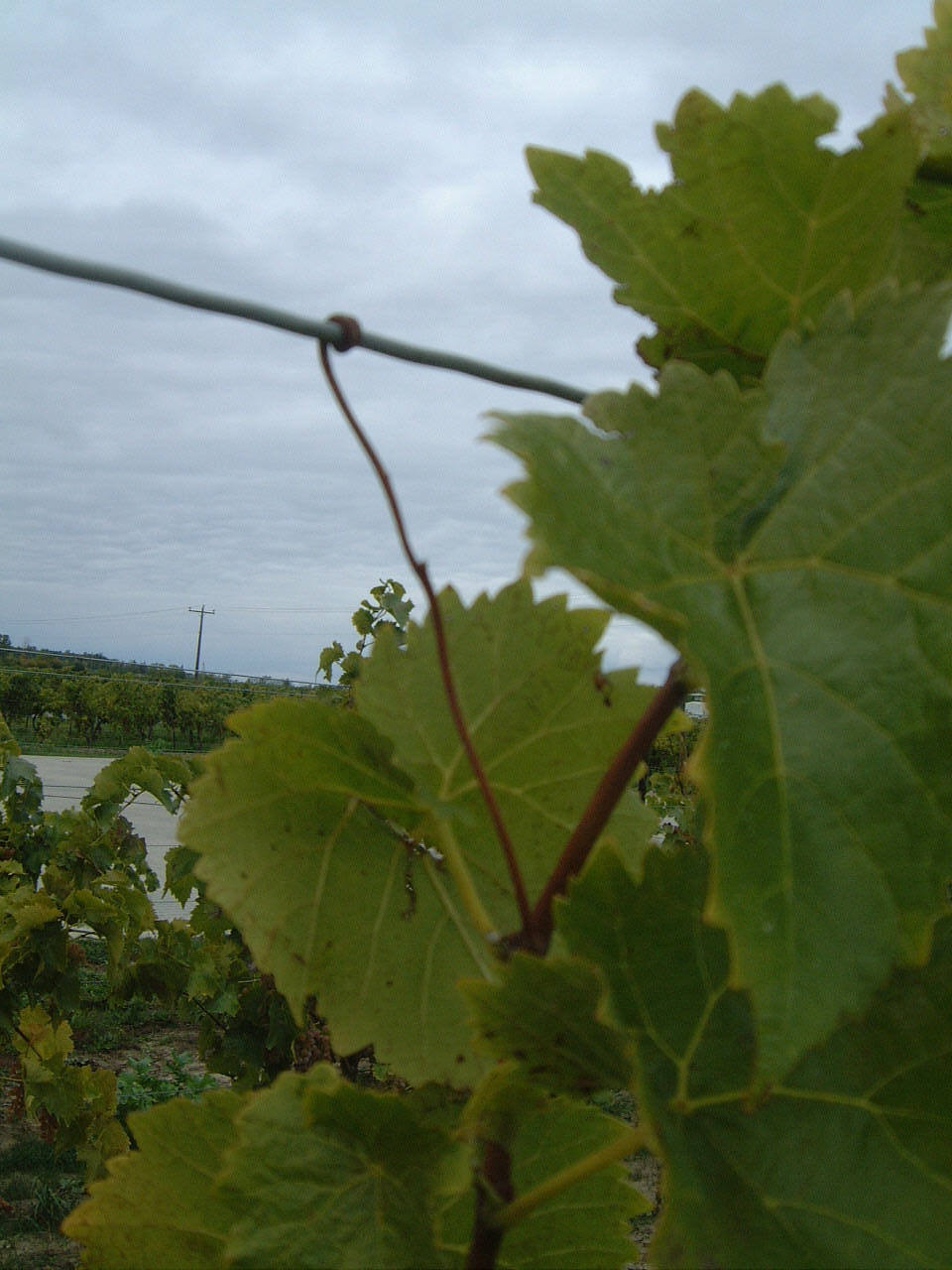
Vine (Vitis) tendril. Note how the plant reaches for and wraps around the galvanised wire provided for the purpose. This is a very tough twig and appears to have no other purpose than support for the plant. Nothing else grows from it. It must reach out softly, then wrap around and then dry and toughen. See more at thigmotropism.

At the root tip, amyloplasts containing starch granules fall in the direction of gravity. This weight activates secondary receptors, which signal to the plant the direction of the gravitational pull. After this occurs, auxin is redistributed through polar auxin transport and differential growth towards gravity begins. In the shoots, auxin redistribution occurs in a way to produce differential growth away from gravity.

For perception to occur, the plant often must be able to sense, perceive, and translate the direction of gravity. Without gravity, proper orientation will not occur and the plant will not effectively grow. The root will not be able to uptake nutrients or water, and the shoot will not grow towards the sky to maximize photosynthesis.

=== Touch ===
All plants are able to sense touch. Thigmotropism is directional movement that occurs in plants responding to physical touch. Climbing plants, such as tomatoes, exhibit thigmotropism, allowing them to curl around objects. These responses are generally slow (on the order of multiple hours), and can best be observed with time-lapse cinematography, but rapid movements can occur as well. For example, the so-called "sensitive plant" (Mimosa pudica) responds to even the slightest physical touch by quickly folding its thin pinnate leaves such that they point downwards, and carnivorous plants such as the Venus flytrap (Dionaea muscipula) produce specialized leaf structures that snap shut when touched or landed upon by insects. In the Venus flytrap, touch is detected by cilia lining the inside of the specialized leaves, which generate an action potential that stimulates motor cells and causes movement to occur.

=== Smell ===
Wounded or infected plants produce distinctive volatile odors, (e.g. methyl jasmonate, methyl salicylate, green leaf volatiles), which can in turn be perceived by neighboring plants. Plants detecting these sorts of volatile signals often respond by increasing their chemical defences and/or prepare for attack by producing chemicals which defend against insects or attract insect predators.

=== Vibration ===
Plants upregulate chemical defenses such as glucosinolate and anthocyanin in response to vibrations created during herbivory.

== Signal transduction ==
=== Plant hormones and chemical signals ===
Plants systematically use hormonal signalling pathways to coordinate their development and morphology.

Plants produce several signal molecules usually associated with animal nervous systems, such as glutamate, GABA, acetylcholine, melatonin, and serotonin. They may also use ATP, NO, and ROS for signaling in similar ways as animals do.

=== Electrophysiology ===
Plants have a variety of methods of delivering electrical signals. The four commonly recognized propagation methods include action potentials (APs), variation potentials (VPs), local electric potentials (LEPs), and systemic potentials (SPs)

Although plant cells are not neurons, they can be electrically excitable and can display rapid electrical responses in the form of APs to environmental stimuli. APs allow for the movement of signaling ions and molecules from the pre-potential cell to the post-potential cell(s). These electrophysiological signals are constituted by gradient fluxes of ions such as H^{+}, K^{+}, Cl^{−}, Na^{+}, and Ca^{2+} but it is also thought that other electrically charge ions such as Fe^{3+}, Al^{3+}, Mg^{2+}, Zn^{2+}, Mn^{2+}, and Hg^{2+} may also play a role in downstream outputs. The maintenance of each ions electrochemical gradient is vital in the health of the cell in that if the cell would ever reach equilibrium with its environment, it is dead. This dead state can be due to a variety of reasons such as ion channel blocking or membrane puncturing.

These electrophysiological ions bind to receptors on the receiving cell causing downstream effects result from one or a combination of molecules present. This means of transferring information and activating physiological responses via a signaling molecule system has been found to be faster and more frequent in the presence of APs.

These action potentials can influence processes such as actin-based cytoplasmic streaming, plant organ movements, wound responses, respiration, photosynthesis, and flowering. These electrical responses can cause the synthesis of numerous organic molecules, including ones that act as neuroactive substances in other organisms such as calcium ions.

The ion flux across cells also influences the movement of other molecules and solutes. This changes the osmotic gradient of the cell, resulting in changes to turgor pressure in plant cells by water and solute flux across cell membranes. These variations are vital for nutrient uptake, growth, many types of movements (tropisms and nastic movements) among other basic plant physiology and behavior. (Higinbotham 1973; Scott 2008; Segal 2016).

Thus, plants achieve behavioural responses in environmental, communicative, and ecological contexts.

=== Signal perception ===
Plant behavior is mediated by phytochromes, kinins, hormones, antibiotic or other chemical release, changes of water and chemical transport, and other means.

Plants have many strategies to fight off pests. For example, they can produce a slew of different chemical toxins against predators and parasites or they can induce rapid cell death to prevent the spread of infectious agents. Plants can also respond to volatile signals produced by other plants. Jasmonate levels also increase rapidly in response to mechanical perturbations such as tendril coiling.

In plants, the mechanism responsible for adaptation is signal transduction. Adaptive responses include:

- Active foraging for light and nutrients. They do this by changing their architecture, e.g. branch growth and direction, physiology, and phenotype.
- Leaves and branches being positioned and oriented in response to a light source.
- Detecting soil volume and adapting growth accordingly, independently of nutrient availability.
- Defending against herbivores.

== See also ==
- Auxin
- Chemotropism
- Ethylene
- Gravitropism
- Heliotropism
- Hydrotropism
- Hypersensitive response
- Kairomone
- Kinesis (biology)
- Nastic movements
- Phytosemiotics
- Plant defense against herbivory
- Plant evolutionary developmental biology
- Plant intelligence
- Plant tolerance to herbivory
- Rapid plant movement
- Statocyte
- Stoma
- Systemic acquired resistance
- Taxis
- Thermotropism
- Tropism
