= Plant defense =

Plant defense may refer to:

- Plant defense against herbivory
- Inducible plant defenses against herbivory
- Plant tolerance to herbivory
- Plant use of endophytic fungi in defense
- Plant disease resistance
- Secondary metabolite
- Hypersensitive response

== See also ==
- Protocarnivorous plant
