= Shiv Raj Singh (entomologist) =

Indian entomologist (1936–2022)

- Born: 18 November 1936; Hyderabad, Hyderabad State, British India
- Died: 13 December 2022 (aged 86)
- Education: Osmania University (BSc); Oklahoma State University (MS); Kansas State University (PhD)
- Known for: Insect pests of cowpea; director of IITA's Grain Legume Improvement Program
- Spouse: Manju Kumari (m. 1964)
- Children: 4
- Scientific career
- Fields: Entomology, host-plant resistance, grain legumes
- Workplaces: Osmania University; Indian Agricultural Research Institute; International Institute of Tropical Agriculture; World Bank
- Doctoral advisor: Reginald Henry Painter

Shiv Raj Singh (18 November 1936 – 13 December 2022), also written Shivraj Singh, was an Indian entomologist who led research on insect pests of cowpea and other tropical grain legumes at the International Institute of Tropical Agriculture (IITA) in Ibadan, Nigeria, where he directed the Grain Legume Improvement Program from 1985 to 1990, and subsequently served as a senior agriculturist at the World Bank. He edited several standard reference volumes on tropical legume pests and production, including Soybeans for the Tropics (1987) and Insect Pests of Tropical Food Legumes (1990).

== Early life and education ==
He graduated BSc from Osmania University in 1959 and went to the United States for graduate study, taking an MS at Oklahoma State University in 1960 and a PhD at Kansas State University in 1962. At Kansas State he worked in the Department of Entomology under Reginald Henry Painter, the founder of the study of host-plant resistance to insects; their joint paper on biotypes of the corn leaf aphid appeared in the Journal of Economic Entomology in 1964.

While at Osmania he was a member of a university side that included M. L. Jaisimha, Asif Iqbal and Abbas Ali Baig, and was selected for the Hyderabad state team in the Ranji Trophy. He made his first-class debut against Mysore at Mysore on 20–22 December 1958, opening the batting and scoring 5 and 14, and played twice more in the 1959–60 season, against Mysore at the Lal Bahadur Stadium, Hyderabad, in November 1959 and against Andhra in January 1960, when Hyderabad won by eight wickets. In the records of the period he appears as K. Shivaraj.

== Career ==
Singh returned to India as a lecturer at Osmania University (1961–63) and was then a senior scientist at the Indian Agricultural Research Institute, New Delhi (1964–66). From 1969 to 1972 he was agronomist and head of the rice research station of CIBA in Java, Indonesia.

In 1973 he joined the International Institute of Tropical Agriculture at Ibadan as a scientist in its Grain Legume Improvement Program, becoming assistant director in 1982 and Director of the program in 1985, a post he held until 1990. His research there concentrated on the insect pests of cowpea, in particular the legume pod-borer Maruca testulalis and the cowpea aphid, and on breeding for resistance to them; the cowpea variety VITA-5 was among the program's releases. With Helmut van Emden he wrote the Annual Review of Entomology survey of insect pests of grain legumes (1979). In 1979–80 he spent a year as a visiting professor at Cornell University in Ithaca, New York. Under his direction the program also expanded IITA's soybean breeding and utilisation work for African smallholders, which he reported with Kenton Dashiell and others in Soybean Research at IITA (1990).

In 1991 Singh moved to Washington, D.C., as a senior agriculturist with the World Bank. He continued to publish with former colleagues on cowpea aphid resistance into the 1990s, and was a co-author, listed as retired, of papers presented at the Entomological Society of America annual meeting in December 2009. He retired from the World Bank's senior staff in 1998, and continued to work for it as a consultant until 2006.

== Books ==
- Pests of Grain Legumes: Ecology and Control, edited with H. F. van Emden and T. Ajibola Taylor. London: Academic Press, 1978. ISBN 0-12-646350-6.
- Cowpea Pests and Diseases, with D. J. Allen. IITA Manual Series No. 2. Ibadan: IITA, 1979.
- Cowpea Research, Production and Utilization, edited with K. O. Rachie. Chichester: John Wiley, 1985.
- Soybeans for the Tropics: Research, Production and Utilization, edited with K. O. Rachie and K. E. Dashiell. Chichester: John Wiley, 1987.
- Insect Pests of Tropical Food Legumes, editor. Chichester: John Wiley, 1990. ISBN 0-471-92390-7.

== Personal life ==
His wife, writing as Manju Shivraj Singh and later as Manju Kumari Singh, is the author of several cookery books, including The Spice Box: A Vegetarian Indian Cookbook (1981), Royal Indian Cookery: A Taste of Palace Life (1982), Shaakaahaari: Indian Vegetarian Cookery (1997) and Vegetarian Indian Cooking.

== Death ==
Singh died on 13 December 2022, survived by his four daughters Shivina, Rupina, Shivika and Roshika.
