= Plant perception =

Plant perception may refer to:

- Plant perception (physiology), the study of the physiologic mechanisms of plant perception and response to the environment
- Plant perception (paranormal), the study of emotion, polysomnography and paranormal phenomenon as applies to plants
