= Statolith =

Statolith may refer to:

- A structure in the statocyst, which allows certain invertebrates to sense gravity and balance
- A structure in the statocyte, cells which allow plants to sense gravity
- Otolith: a structure in the inner ear, which allows vertebrates to sense gravity and balance.
