= Columella (botany) =

Axis of sterile tissue

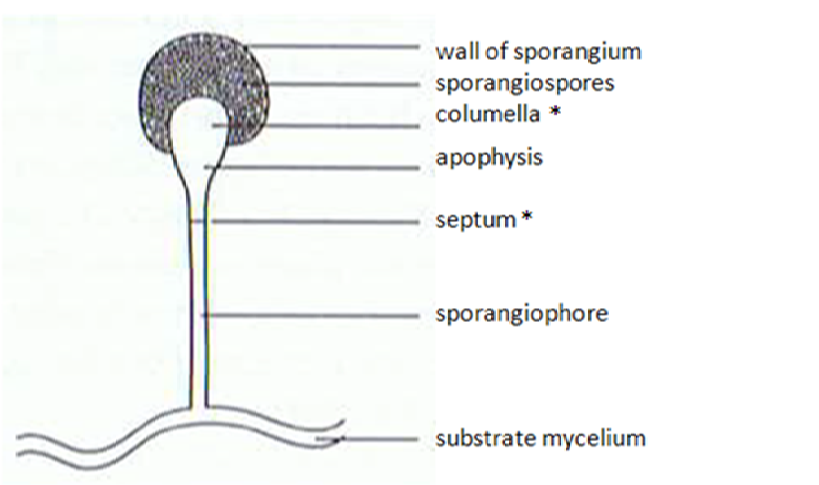
Zygote fungus sporangium, with columella labelled

Columella (in plants) is an axis of sterile tissue which passes through the center of the spore-case of mosses. In fungi, it refers to a centrally vacuolated part of a hypha, bearing spores. The word finds analogous usage in myxomycetes.

The term columella is also used to refer to story 1 to story 4 (S1 – S4) cells in the root cap, located apically of the quiescent centre. In vascular plants, columella tissue helps the roots to perceive gravity. Within columella cells, the amyloplasts and Golgi apparatus organelles tend to fall to the bottom third of the cell.
