= Prolonged sine =

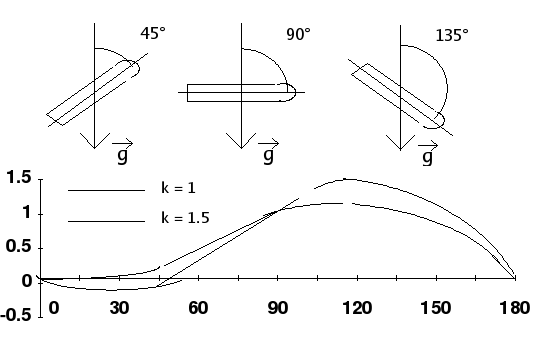
The two typical dependencies of the bending speed from the reorientation angle (experimental data from Metzner, 1929).

The law of the prolonged sine was observed when measuring the strength of the reaction of the plant stems and roots in response to turning from their usual vertical orientation. Such organisms maintained their usual vertical growth, and, if turned, start bending back toward the vertical. The prolonged sine law was observed when measuring the dependence of the bending speed from the angle of reorientation.

== The observed law ==
It was observed that deviation from the desired growth direction by more than the 90 degrees causes further increase of the bending speed. After turning the 135 degrees the reoriented plant or fungi understands that it is placed "head down" and bends faster than turned by just 45 degrees. Poul Larsen in 1962 proposed, that the intensity of the gravitropic reaction (bending rate) is proportional to

$$g \times a\sin\alpha \times (1-b\cos\alpha)$$

where α is the angle of reorientation, g - gravity vector and constants a and b are determined experimentally.

== Significance ==
Following the popular hypothesis of the mechanism of the plant spatial orientation, the bending from the horizontal position is caused by some small heavy particles that after turning put pressure on the side cell (statocyte) wall, irritating some systems and activating the bending process. The pressure of such particle to the cell would be proportional to the sine of the reorientation angle, being maximal at 90° reorientation. It would be equal for the reorientations by both 45° and 135°. The prolonged sine law concludes that there are very significant deviations from such a predicted reaction.
