= Quiescent centre =

Group of cells in vascular plants

The quiescent centre is a group of cells, up to 1,000 in number, in the form of a hemisphere, with the flat face toward the root tip of vascular plants. It is a region in the apical meristem of a root where cell division proceeds very slowly or not at all, but the cells are capable of resuming meristematic activity when the tissue surrounding them is damaged. Cells of root apical meristems do not all divide at the same rate. Determinations of relative rates of DNA synthesis show that primary roots of Zea, Vicia and Allium have quiescent centres to the meristems, in which the cells divide rarely or never in the course of normal root growth (Clowes, 1958). Such a quiescent centre includes the cells at the apices of the histogens of both stele and cortex. Its presence can be deduced from the anatomy of the apex in Zea (Clowes, 1958), but not in the other species which lack discrete histogens.

== History ==
In 1953, during the course of analysing the organization and function of the root apices, Frederick Albert Lionel Clowes (born 10 September 1921), at the School of Botany (now Department of Plant Sciences), University of Oxford, proposed the term ‘cytogenerative centre’ to denote ‘the region of an apical meristem from which all future cells are derived’. This term had been suggested to him by Mr Harold K. Pusey, a lecturer in embryology at the Department of Zoology and Comparative Anatomy at the same university. The 1953 paper of Clowes reported results of his experiments on Fagus sylvatica and Vicia faba, in which small oblique and wedge-shaped excisions were made at the tip of the primary root, at the most distal level of the root body, near the boundary with the root cap. The results of these experiments were striking and showed that: the root which grew on following the excision was normal at the undamaged meristem side; the nonexcised meristem portion contributed to the regeneration of the excised portion; the regenerated part of the root had abnormal patterning and ‘remained so for a time considered sufficiently long for the complete replacement of all the derivatives of the initials’. The main conclusion from these experiments was that the root tissues originated from a promeristem which was considered to be ‘cytogenerative centre’, also called ‘cytogenetic centre’, ‘ontogenetic centre’, and ‘constructional centre’. Clowes indicated that the cytogenerative centre was a property of roots with broad columellas (i.e. of roots having an ‘open’ type of apical meristem, as was the case in the roots of the two species studied). He then wished to know whether the same property applied to thinner roots with narrow columellas (i.e. roots with a ‘closed’ type of meristem). Using roots of Zea mays and Triticum vulgare, this indeed turned out to be the case, and he was then able to state that ‘the cytogenerative centre is conceived as the part of the apical meristem from which all future tissues are derived’. We may infer that Clowes regarded the cytogenerative centre as a universal feature of roots because he used the term also with respect to the structure and function of the root meristem of conifers.

== Sources ==
- FAL Clowes, 1921–2016: a Memoir
