= Plant tolerance to herbivory =

Tolerance is the ability of plants to mitigate the negative fitness effects caused by herbivory. It is one of the general plant defense strategies against herbivores, the other being resistance, which is the ability of plants to prevent damage (Strauss and Agrawal 1999). Plant defense strategies play important roles in the survival of plants as they are fed upon by many different types of herbivores, especially insects, which may impose negative fitness effects (Strauss and Zangerl 2002). Damage can occur in almost any part of the plants, including the roots, stems, leaves, flowers and seeds (Strauss and Zergerl 2002). In response to herbivory, plants have evolved a wide variety of defense mechanisms and although relatively less studied than resistance strategies, tolerance traits play a major role in plant defense (Strauss and Zergerl 2002, Rosenthal and Kotanen 1995).

Traits that confer tolerance are controlled genetically and therefore are heritable traits under selection (Strauss and Agrawal 1999). Many factors intrinsic to the plants, such as growth rate, storage capacity, photosynthetic rates and nutrient allocation and uptake, can affect the extent to which plants can tolerate damage (Rosenthal and Kotanen 1994). Extrinsic factors such as soil nutrition, carbon dioxide levels, light levels, water availability and competition also have an effect on tolerance (Rosenthal and Kotanen 1994).

== History of the study of plant tolerance ==
Studies of tolerance to herbivory has historically been the focus of agricultural scientists (Painter 1958; Bardner and Fletcher 1974). Tolerance was actually initially classified as a form of resistance (Painter 1958). Agricultural studies on tolerance, however, are mainly concerned with the compensatory effect on the plants' yield and not its fitness, since it is of economical interest to reduce crop losses due to herbivory by pests (Trumble 1993; Bardner and Fletcher 1974). One surprising discovery made about plant tolerance was that plants can overcompensate for the damaged caused by herbivory, causing controversy whether herbivores and plants can actually form a mutualistic relationship (Belsky 1986).

It was soon recognized that many factors involved in plants tolerance, such as photosynthetic rates and nutrient allocation, were also traits intrinsic to plant growth and so resource availability may play an important role (Hilbert et al. 1981; Maschinski and Whitham 1989). The growth rate model proposed by Hilbert et al. (1981) predicts plants have higher tolerance in environments that does not allow them to grow at maximum capacity, while the compensatory continuum hypothesis by Maschinski and Whitham (1989) predicts higher tolerance in resource rich environments. Although it was the latter that received higher acceptance, 20 years later, the limiting resource model was proposed to explain the lack of agreement between empirical data and existing models (Wise and Abrahamson 2007). Currently, the limiting resource model is able to explain much more of the empirical data on plant tolerance relative to either of the previous models (Wise and Abrahamson 2008a).

It was only recently that the assumption that tolerance and resistance must be negatively associated has been rejected (Nunez-Farfan et al. 2007). The classical assumption that tolerance traits confer no negative fitness consequences on herbivores has also been questioned (Stinchcombe 2002). Further studies using techniques in quantitative genetics have also provided evidence that tolerance to herbivory is heritable (Fornoni 2011). Studies of plant tolerance have only received increased attention recently, unlike resistance traits which were much more heavily studied (Fornoni 2011). Many aspects of plant tolerance such as its geographic variation, its macroevolutionary implications and its coevolutionary effects on herbivores are still relatively unknown (Fornoni 2011).

== Mechanisms of tolerance ==
Plants utilize many mechanisms to recover fitness from damage. Such traits include increased photosynthetic activity, compensatory growth, phenological changes, utilizing stored reserves, reallocating resources, increase in nutrients uptake, and plant architecture (Rosenthal and Kotanen 1994; Strauss and Agrawal 1999; Tiffin 2000).

=== Photosynthetic rates ===
An increase in photosynthetic rate in undamaged tissues is commonly cited as a mechanism for plants to achieve tolerance (Trumble et al. 1993; Strauss and Agrawal 1999). This is possible since leaves often function at below their maximum capacity (Trumble et al. 1993). Several different pathways may lead to increases in photosynthesis, including higher levels of the Rubisco enzyme and delays in leaf senescence (Stowe et al. 2000). However, detecting an increase in environment does not mean plants are tolerant to damage. The resources gained from these mechanisms can be used to increase resistance instead of tolerance, such as for the production secondary compounds in the plant (Tiffin 2000). Also, whether the increase in photosynthetic rate is able to compensate for the damage is still not well studied (Trumble et al. 1993; Stowe et al. 2000).

=== Compensatory growth ===
Biomass regrowth following herbivory is often reported as an indicator of tolerance and plant response after apical meristem damage (AMD) is one of the most heavily studied mechanisms of tolerance (Tiffin 2000; Suwa and Maherali 2008; Wise and Abrahamson 2008). Meristems are sites of rapid cell divisions and so have higher nutrition than most other tissues on the plants . Damage to apical meristems of plants may release it from apical dominance, activating the growth of axillary meristems which increases branching (Trumble et al. 1993; Wise and Abrahamson 2008). Studies have found branching after AMD to undercompensate, fully compensate and overcompensate for the damage received (Marquis 1996, Haukioja and Koricheva 2000, Wise and Abrahamson 2008). The variation in the extent of growth following herbivory may depend on the number and distribution of meristems, the pattern in which they are activated and the number of new meristems (Stowe et al. 2000). The wide occurrence of overcompensation after AMD has also brought up a controversial idea that there may be a meristem relationship between plants and their herbivores (Belsky 1986; Agrawal 2000; Edwards 2009). As will be further discussed below, herbivores may actually be mutualists of plants, such as Ipomopsis aggregata, which overcompensate for herbivory (Edwards 2009). Although there are many examples showing biomass regrowth following herbivory, it has been criticized as a useful predictor of fitness since the resources used for regrowth may translate to fewer resources allocated to reproduction (Suwa and Maherali 2008).

=== Phenological change ===
Studies have shown herbivory can cause delays in plant growth, flowering and fruit production (Tiffin 2000). How plants respond to these phenological delays is likely a tolerance mechanism that will depend highly on their life history and other ecological factors such as, the abundance of pollinators at different times during the season (Tiffin 2000). If the growing season is short, plants that are able to shorten the delay of seed production caused by herbivory are more tolerant than those that cannot shorten this phenological change (Tiffin 2000). These faster recovering plant will be selectively favored over those that cannot as they will pass on more of their offspring to the next generation. In longer growing seasons, however, there may be enough time for most plants to produce seeds before the season ends regardless of damage. In this case, plants that can shorten the phenological delay are not any more tolerant than those that cannot as all plants can reproduce before the season ends (Tiffin 2000).

=== Stored reserves and resource reallocation ===
Resource allocation following herbivory is commonly studied in agricultural systems (Trumble et al. 1993). Resources are most often allocated to reproductive structures after damage, as shown by Irwin et al. (2008) in which Polemonium viscosum and Ipomopsis aggregata increased flower production after flower larceny. When these reproductive structures are not present, resources are allocated to other tissues, such as leaves and shoots as seen in juvenile Plantago lanceolata (Trumble et al. 1993; Barton 2008). Utilizing stored reserves may be an important tolerance mechanism for plants which have abundant time to collect and store resources, such as perennial plants (Tiffin 2000; Erb et al. 2009). Resources are often stored in leaves and specialized storage organs such as tubers and roots, and studies have shown evidence that these resources are allocated for regrowth following herbivory (Trumble et al. 1993; Tiffin 2000; Erb et al. 2009). However, the importance of this mechanism to tolerance is not well studied and it is unknown how much it contributes to tolerance since stored reserves mostly consist of carbon resources, whereas tissue damage causes a loss of carbon, nitrogen and other nutrients (Tiffin 2000).

=== Plant architecture ===
This form of tolerance relies on constitutive mechanisms, such as morphology, at the time of damage, unlike the induced mechanisms mentioned above. plant architecture includes roots to shoots ratios, stem number, stem rigidity and plant vasculature (Marquis 1996, Tiffin 2000). A high roots to shoots ratio will allow plants to better absorb nutrients following herbivory and rigid stems will prevent collapse after sustaining damage, increasing plant tolerance (Tiffin 2000). Since plants have a meristemic construction, how resources are restricted among different regions of the plants, referred to as sectoriality, will affect the ability to transfer resources from undamaged areas to damaged areas (Marquis 1996). Although plant vasculature may play important roles in tolerance, it is not well studied due to the difficulties in identifying the flow of resources (Marquis 1996). Increasing a plant's vasculature would seem advantageous since it increases the flow of resources to all sites of damage but it may also increase its susceptibility to herbivores, such as phloem suckers (Marquis 1996, Stowe et al. 2000).

== Measuring tolerance ==
Tolerance is operationally defined as the slope of the regression between fitness and level of damage (Stinchcombe 2002). Since an individual plant can only sustain one level of damage, it is necessary to measure fitness using a group of related individuals, preferably full-sibs or clones to minimize other factors that may influence tolerance, after sustaining different levels of damage (Stinchcombe 2002). Tolerance is often presented as a reaction norm, where slopes larger than, equal to and less than zero reflect overcompensation, full compensation and undercompensation, respectively (Strauss and Agrawal 1999).

=== Scales of measurement ===
Both fitness and herbivory can be measured or analyzed using an absolute (additive) scale or a relative (multiplicative) scale (Wise and Carr 2008b). The absolute scale may refer to number of fruits produced or total area of leaf eaten, while the relative scale may refer to proportion of fruits damaged or proportion of leaves eaten. Wise and Carr (2008b) suggested that it is best to keep the measure of fitness and the measure of damage on the same scale when analyzing tolerance since having them on different scales may result is misleading outcomes. Even if the data were measured using different scales, data on the absolute scale can be log-transformed to be more similar to data on a relative (multiplicative) scale (Wise and Carr 2008b).

=== Simulated vs natural herbivory ===
A majority of studies use simulated or manipulated herbivory, such as clipping leaves or herbivore exclusions, due to the difficulty in controlling damage levels under natural conditions (Tiffin and Inouye 2000). The advantage of using natural herbivory is that plants will experience the pattern of damage that selection has favored tolerance for, but there may be biases resulting from unmeasured environmental variables that may affect both plant and herbivores. Using simulated herbivory allows for the control of environmental variables, but replicating natural herbivory is difficult, causing plants to respond differently from imposed and natural herbivory (Tiffin and Inouye 2000). Growing plants in the control environment of the greenhouse may also affect their response as it is still a novel environment to the plants. Even if the plots are grown in natural settings, the methods of excluding or including herbivores, such as using cages or pesticides, may also affect plant tolerance (Tiffin and Inouye 2000). Lastly, models have predicted that manipulated herbivory may actually result in less precise estimates of tolerance relative to that from natural herbivory (Tiffin and Inoue 2000).

=== Fitness traits ===
Many studies have shown that using different measurements of fitness may give varying outcomes of tolerance (Strauss and Agrawal 1999; Suwa and Maherali 2008; Banta et al. 2010). Banta et al. (2010) found that their measure of tolerance will differ depending on whether fruit production or total viable seed production was used to reflect fitness in Arabdopsis thaliana. Careful considerations must be made to choose traits that are linked to fitness as closely as possible when measuring tolerance.

== Tolerance-resistance trade-off ==
It is classically assumed that there is a negative correlation between the levels of tolerance and resistance in plants (Stowe et al. 2000; Nunez-Farfan et al. 2007). For this trade-off to exist, it requires that tolerance and resistance be redundant defense strategies with similar costs to the plant (Nunez-Farfan et al. 2007). If this is the case, then plants that are able to tolerate damage will suffer little decrease in fitness and so resistance would not be selectively favored. For highly resistant plants, allocating resources to tolerance would not be selectively favored as the plant received minimal damage in the first place.

There is now increasing evidence that many plants allocate resources to both types of defense strategies (Nunez-Farfan et al. 2007). There is also evidence that there may not be a trade-off between tolerance and resistance at all and that they may evolve independently (Leimu and Koricheva 2006; Nunez-Farfan et al. 2007; Muola et al. 2010). Models have shown that intermediate levels of resistance and tolerance are evolutionary stable as long as the benefits of having both traits are more than additive (Nunez-Farfan et al. 2007). Tolerance and resistance may not be redundant strategies since tolerance could be necessary for damage from large mammalian herbivores or specialist herbivores which have the ability to circumvent resistance traits of the plant (Nunez-Farfan et al. 2007; Muola et al. 2010). Also, as traits that confer tolerance are usually basic characteristics of plants, the result of photosynthetic on growth and not herbivory may also affect tolerance (Rosenthal and Kotanen 1994).

=== Ontogenetic shifts ===
It has been suggested that the trade-off between resistance and tolerance may change throughout the development of the plants. It is often assumed that seedlings and juveniles are less tolerant of herbivory since they did not develop the structures required for resource acquisition and so will rely more on traits that confer resistance (Boege et al. 2007; Barton 2008, Barton and Koricheva 2010; Tucker and Avila-Sakar 2010). Although many studies find lower tolerance in seedlings, this is not always the case, as seen in juveniles of Plant ago lanceolata which can fully compensate for 50% defoliation (Barton 2008). There is also the added complexity of shifts in herbivore communities as the plant develops and so may favor tolerance or resistance at different life stages (Barton and Koricheva 2010).

== Effects of resource levels on tolerance ==
The response of plants to herbivory is often plastic and varies according to the conditions it is experiencing (Wise and Abrahamson 2005). The major resources that affect plant growth and also tolerance are water, light, carbon dioxide and soil nutrients. Water and light levels are generally assumed to be positively associated with tolerance (Strauss and Agrawal 1999). However, there are exceptions such as evidence of decreased tolerance in Madia sativa with increased water availability (Wise and Abrahamson 2007, Gonzales et al. 2008). Many studies have found CO_{2} levels to decrease tolerance in plants (Lau and Tiffin 2009). Increased nutrient levels are also commonly found to be negatively associated with tolerance (Wise and Abrahamson 2007).

There are currently three prominent models that predict how resource levels may alter a plants 's tolerance to herbivory.

=== Growth rate model (GRM) ===
The GRM proposes that the growth rate of the plant at the time of damage is important in determining its response (Hilbert et al. 1981). Plants that are growing in stressful conditions, such as low resource levels or high competition, are growing below their maximum growth rate and so may have a higher capacity for regrowth after receiving damage (Hilbert et al. 1981). In contrast, plants in relatively benign conditions are growing near their maximum growth rate. These plants are less able to recover from damage since they are already near their innate maximum growth rate (Hilbert et al. 1981).

=== Compensatory continuum hypothesis (CCH) ===
The CCH suggests that there is a continuum of responses to herbivory (Maschinski and Whitham 1989). It predicts that plants growing in less stressful environment conditions, such as high resource or low competition, are better able to tolerate herbivory since they have abundant resources to replace lost tissues and recover from the damage. Plants growing in stressful environments are then predicted to have lower tolerance (Maschinski and Whitham 1989).

=== Limiting resource model (LRM) ===
This recently proposed model takes into account the resource that is limiting plant fitness, the resource affected by herbivory and how the acquisition of resources is affected by herbivory (Wise and Abrahamson 2005). Unlike the GRM and CCH, it is able to incorporate the type of damage received since different modes of herbivory may cause different resources to be affected by herbivory. The LRM encompasses every possible outcome of tolerance (i.e. equal tolerance in both environments, higher tolerance in low stress environments and lower tolerance in low stress environments) and allows multiple pathways to reach these outcome.

Currently, the LRM seems to be most useful in predicting the effects that varying resources levels may have on tolerance (Wise and Abrahamson 2007). Meta-analyses by Hawkes and Sullivan (2001) and Wise and Abrahamson (2007, 2008a) found that the CCH and GRM were insufficient in predicting the diversity of plant tolerance to herbivory. Banta et al. (2010), however, suggested that the LRM should be represented as a set of seven models, instead of one, since each individual part of the LRM requires different assumptions.

== Selection on herbivores ==
It is classically assumed that tolerance traits do not impose selection on herbivore fitness (Strauss and Agrawal 1999). This is in contrast to traits that confer resistance, which are likely to affect herbivore fitness and lead to a co-evolutionary arms race (Stinchcombe 2002; Espinosa and Fornoni 2006). However, there are possible mechanisms in which tolerance may affect herbivore fitness .

One mechanism requires a genetic association between loci that confers resistance and tolerance either through tight linkage or pleiotropy (Stinchcombe 2002). photosynthetic for either trait will then also affect the other. If there is a positive correlation between the two traits, then selection for increased tolerance will also increase resistance in the plants. If there is a negative correlation between the two traits then selection for increased tolerance will decrease resistance. How common this association exists, however, is uncertain as there are many studies which find no correlation between tolerance and resistance and others which find significant correlations between them (Leimu and Koricheva 2006; Nunez-Farfan et al. 2007; Muola et al. 2010).

If the traits that allow for tolerance affects the plant tissue's quality, quantity or availability, tolerance may also impose selection on herbivores. Consider a case where tolerance is achieved through activation of dormant meristems in the plants . These new plant tissues may be of lower quality than what was previously eaten by herbivores. herbivores which have higher rates of consumption or can more efficiently use this new resource may be selectively favored over those that cannot (Stinchcombe 2002).

Espinosa and Fornoni (2006) was one study which directly investigated whether tolerance may impose selection on herbivores. As suggested by Stinchcombe (2002), they used plants which had similar resistance but differed in tolerance to more easily differentiate the effects of each trait. As expected, they found evidence that resistance in plants affected herbivore fitness, but they were unable to find any effects of tolerance on herbivore fitness .

A recent model by Restif and Koella (2003) found that plant tolerance can directly impose selection on pathogens. Assuming that investment in tolerance will reduce plant fecundity, infection by pathogens will decrease the number of uninfected hosts. There may then be selection for decreased virulence in the pathogens, so that their plant host will survive long enough to produce enough offspring for future pathogens to infect (Restif and Koelle 2003). However, this may only have limited application to herbivores.

== Species interactions ==
=== Plant communities ===
Herbivory can have large effects on the succession and diversity of plants communities (Anderson and Briske 1995; Stowe et al. 2000; Pejman et al. 2009). Thus, plant defense strategies are important in determining temporal and spatial variation of plant species as it may change the competitive abilities of plants following herbivory. (Anderson and Briske 1995; Stowe et al. 2000).

Past studies have suggested plant resistance to play the major role in species diversity within communities, but tolerance may also be an important factor (Stowe et al. 2000; Pejman et al. 2009). Herbivory may allow less competitive, but tolerant plants to survive in communities dominated by highly competitive but intolerant plant species, thereby increasing diversity (Mariotte et al. 2013). Pejman et al. (2009) found support for this idea in an experimental study on grassland species. In low resource environments, highly competitive (dominant) plants species had lower tolerance than the less competitive (subordinate) species. They also found that the addition of fertilizers offset the negative effects of herbivory on dominant plants. It has also been suggested that the observation of species that occur late in ecological succession (late-seral) being replaced by species that occur in the middle of ecological succession (mid-seral) after high herbivory is due to differences in tolerance between them (Anderson and Briske 1995; Off and Ritchie 1998). However, tolerance between these two groups of species do not always differ and other factors, such as selective herbivory on late-seral species, may contribute to these observations (Anderson and Briske 1995).

=== Mutualisms ===
The large number of studies indicating overcompensation in plants following herbivory, especially after apical meristem damage, has led some authors to suggest that there may be meristem relationships between plants and herbivores (Belsky 1986; Agrawal 2000; Edwards 2009). If herbivores provide some benefit for the plant despite causing damage, the plant may evolve tolerance to minimize the damage imposed by the herbivore to shift the relationship more towards mutualism (Edwards 2009). Such benefits include the release from apical dominance, inducing resistance traits to temporally separate herbivores, providing information of future attacks and pollination (Agrawal 2000).

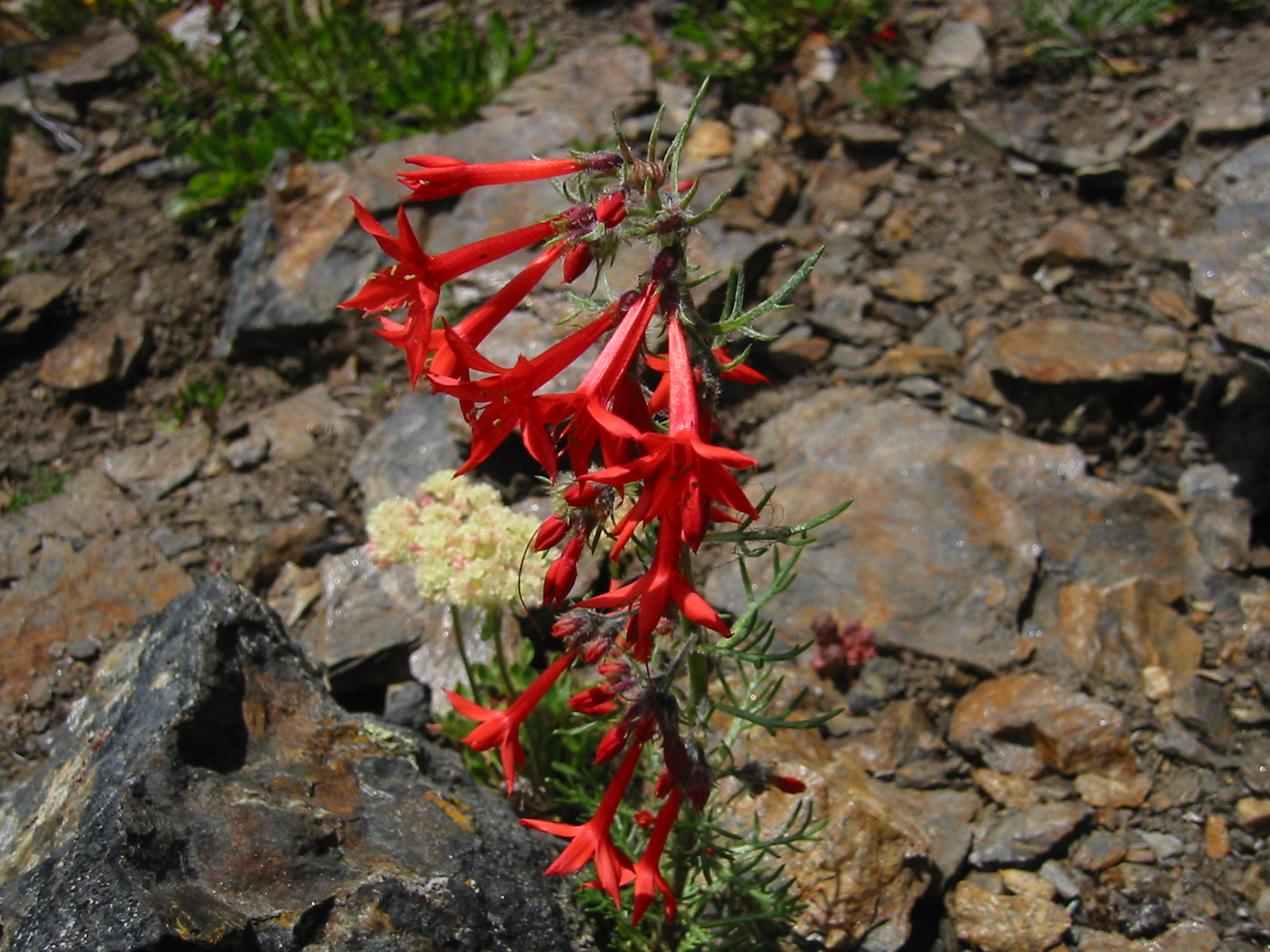
Ipomopsis aggregata

One of the best examples occurs in Ipomopsis aggregata where there is increased seed production and seed siring in damaged plants compared to undamaged plants (Figure 4; Edwards 2009). The probability of attack after the first bout of herbivory is low in the environment inhabited by I. aggregata. Due to the predictability of attacks, these plants have evolved to overcompensate for the damage and produce the majority of their seeds after the initial bout of herbivory (Edwards 2009). Another example involves endophytic fungi, such as Neophtodium, which parasitize plants and produce spores that destroy host inflorescences (Edwards 2009). The fungi also produce alkaloids which protect the plant from herbivores and so the plant may have evolved tolerance to flower damage to acquire this benefit (Edwards 2009). Tolerance may also be involved in the mutualism between the myremecophyte, Cordia nodosa, and its ant symbiont Allomerus octoarticulatus (Edwards and Yu, 2008). The plant provides the ant with shelter and food bodies in return for protection against herbivory, but the ants also sterilize the plant by removing flower buds. C. nodosa is able to compensate for this by reallocating resources to produce flowers on branches not occupied by castrating ants (Edwards and Yu, 2008).

A similar type of meristem involves plants and mycorrhizal fungi (Bennett and Bever 2007). Mycorrhizal fungi inhabit plant roots and increase nutrient uptake for the plant in exchange for food resources. These fungi are also able to alter the tolerance of plants to herbivory and may cause undercompesation, full compensation and overcompensation depending on the species of fungi involved (Bennett and Bever 2007).

== Agriculture ==
Modern agriculture has focuses on using genetically modified crops which possess toxic compounds to reduce damage by pests (Nunez-Farfan et al. 2007). However, the effectiveness of resistance traits may decrease as herbivores fungi counter adaptations to the toxic compound, especially since most farmers are reluctant to assign a proportion of their land to contain susceptible crops (Nunez-Farfan et al. 2007). Another method to increase crop yield is to use lines that are tolerant to herbivory and can compensate or even overcompensate for the damage inflicted (Nunez-Farfan et al. 2007; Poveda et al. 2010).

Alterations in resource allocation due to herbivory is studied heavily in agricultural systems (Trumble et al. 1993). Domestication of plants by selecting for higher yield have undoubtedly also caused changes in various plant growth traits, such as decreased resource allocation to non-yield tissues (Welter and Steggall 1993). Alterations in growth traits is likely to affect plant tolerance since the mechanisms overlap. That domesticated tomato plants have lower tolerance to folivory than their wild progenitors suggests this as well (Welter and Steggall 1993). Most agricultural studies however, are more focused on comparing tolerance between damaged and undamaged crops, not between crops and their wild counterparts. Many have found crops, such as cucumbers, cabbages and cauliflowers, can fully compensate and overcompensate for the damaged received (Trumble et al. 1993). A recent study by Poveda et al. (2010) also found evidence of overcompensation in potato plants in response to tuber damage by the potato tuber moth, Phthorimaea operculella. Unlike previous examples, the potato plant does not reallocate resources, but actually increases overall productivity to increase mass of tubers and aboveground tissues (Poveda et al. 2010).

== See also ==
- Inducible plant defenses against herbivory
- Plant defense against herbivory
- Plant perception (physiology)
