= Hydrotropism =

Growth of a plant in response to a water stimulus

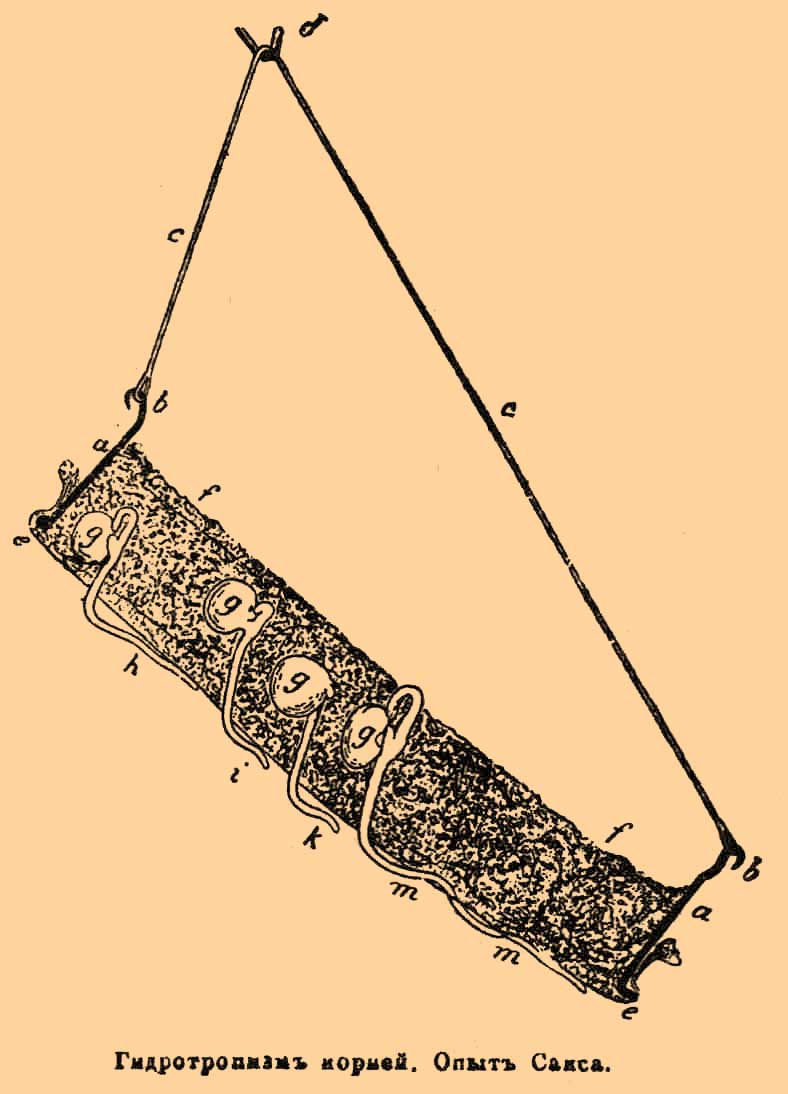
Hydrotropism

Hydrotropism (hydro- "water"; tropism "involuntary orientation by an organism, that involves turning or curving as a positive or negative response to a stimulus") is a plant's growth response in which the direction of growth is determined by a stimulus or gradient in water concentration. A common example is a plant root growing in humid air bending toward a higher relative humidity level.

This is of biological significance as it helps to increase efficiency of the plant in its ecosystem.

The process of hydrotropism is started by the root cap sensing water and sending a signal to the elongating part of the root. Hydrotropism is difficult to observe in underground roots, since the roots are not readily observable, and root gravitropism is usually more influential than root hydrotropism. Water readily moves in soil and soil water content is constantly changing so any gradients in soil moisture are not stable.

Root hydrotropism research has mainly been a laboratory phenomenon for roots grown in humid air rather than soil. Its ecological significance in soil-grown roots is unclear because so little hydrotropism research has examined soil-grown roots. Recent identification of a mutant plant that lacks a hydrotropic response may help to elucidate its role in nature. Hydrotropism may have importance for plants grown in space, where it may allow roots to orient themselves in a microgravity environment.

This behavior is thought to have been developed millions of years ago when plants began their journey onto dry land. While this migration led to much easier consumption of CO_{2}, it greatly reduced the amount of water readily available to the plants. Thus, strong evolutionary pressure was put on the ability to find more water.

== Mechanism ==
Plants recognize water in their environment in order to absorb it for metabolic purposes. The universally used molecules must be sensed and absorbed in order to be used by these organisms. In plants, water can be sensed and is mainly absorbed through the roots, chiefly through young fine roots as compared to mother roots or older fine roots as shown with maize in Varney and Canny's research. The direction and rate of growth of these roots towards water are of interest because these affect the efficiency of water acquisition.

Scientists have known that the roots’ receptors for most stimulus are housed in cells of the root cap since Darwin's 1880 publication of “The power of movement of plants” in which he described his gravitropism experiments. Darwin's experiments studied Vicia faba seedlings. Seedlings were secured in place with pins, the root caps were cauterized, and their growth was observed. Darwin noted that the cauterized root caps did not grow towards any stimulus.

However until very recently, only within the last decade, have scientists found a likely receptor in root caps for signals of water potential gradients. Receptor-like kinases (RLKs) appear to be responsible for this sensing of water potential gradients because of their apt location in the cell membranes of root caps as well as their interactions and effect on a type of aquaporin water channel known as plasma membrane intrinsic protein (PIP). PIPs are also found in the cell membrane and appear to be involved in root hydraulic conductivity. Dietrich hypothesizes that a signal of lower water potential likely affects the interaction between the PIPs and RLKs resulting in differential cell elongation and growth due to fluxes in abscisic acid (ABA) and its following pathways. ABA is a biosynthesized phytohormone that is known to be active in many physiological plant cell development pathways. Support for ABA pathways resulting in hydrotropic responses comes from mutant strains of Arabidopsis thaliana that could not biosynthesize/produce ABA. The mutants were found to have decreased hydrotropic responses such that their root growth towards higher water potentials was not significant. After application of ABA, however, heightened responses of root growth towards higher water potentials were observed.

Furthermore, we have gathered that cytokinins also play a crucial role. Asymmetrical distribution of cytokinin in Arabidopsis roots has reportedly led to higher cell production, and thus increased root growth, in response to lower water potential. This is interesting because cytokinin works antagonistically with auxin, which is a significant part of the gravitropic response pathway. The cytokinins cause the degradation of the auxin transporting PIN1 proteins, which prevents auxin from accumulating in the desired areas for gravitropic bending. This leads us to believe that hydrotropic response can counteract the gravitropic desire to move toward the center of the Earth and allows root systems to spread toward higher water potentials.

This mechanism is supported strongly by the observation of growth patterns of the Arabidopsis abscisic acid mutants (aba_{1-1} and abi_{2-1}) and no hydrotropic response mutant (nhr1). Abscisic acid mutants were unable to produce abscisic acid, and haphazardly were unable to show any significant response to water pressure gradients. It was not until ABA was artificially added to the mutant that it was able to display any hydrotropic response. Equally interesting, the nhr1 mutant shows increased growth rates of roots in response to gravity, and no response to hydrotropic cues. This may be due to the root system being able to freely respond to gravity, without the antagonistic hydrotropic response. The nhr1 plants would begin to show hydrotropic response only in the presence of kinetin, which is a type of cytokinin. This clearly supports the idea that cytokinins play a big role in hydrotropic response. Despite the great support this mutant provides, the genes responsible for these mutants are unknown.

The mechanism of hydrotropism can also be explained by plant ‘hearing’. An experimental study discovered that the roots of the plant detect the location of water by sensing the vibrations produced by water movement. The resulting data supports that plants will grow towards these water-produced vibrations. However, it is also seen that plants grow toward other sources of sound in cases where there is no water actually present. These findings also raised the question of how plants distinguish the vibrations produced by water in comparison to other environmental factors, such as insects or wind. When exposed to varying sounds, there were statistically significant results that showed an attractive response (roots grow toward) to water or sounds mimicking water, and an avoidance response (roots grow away from source) (p-value<0.002). In summary, this research showed that pea plants do, in fact, respond to acoustic frequencies.

The signal for root growth, in this case, is varying water potential in a plant's soil environment; the response is differential growth towards higher water potentials. Plants sense water potential gradients in their root cap and bend in the midsection of the root towards that signal. In this way, plants can identify where to go in order to get water. Other stimuli such as gravity, pressure, and vibrations also help plants choreograph root growth towards water acquisition to adapt to varying amounts of water in a plant's soil environment for use in metabolism. For this reason, it would be beneficial for future research to be conducted on agravitropic mutant plants, such as the ageotropum mutant. Thus, far, these interactions between signals have not been studied in great depth, leaving potential for future research.

== Recent Research ==
Recent research has found significant involvement of auxin, cytokinin, ABA, and MIZ1 in hydrotropic processes. ABA treatment, in addition to blue light irradiation, and stressful environment conditions, increase MIZ1 expression in plants. Arabidopsis plants are dependent on MZ1 for displaying hydrotropic behavior in response to water gradients. The originating environment of a plant dictates the degree of hydrotropic behavior that they display; in dry regions plants exhibit more hydrotropic activity, and in wet regions they display less. The importance of auxin transport for pea plant hydrotropism and gravitropism was proven in experiments that used a multitude of auxin inhibitors. It has been hypothesized that ABA modulated by hydrotropism has an effect on auxin. ABA helps dictate which side of the root grows at a faster rate, and thus which direction the root will grow. In gravitropism, the gradient between cytosolic and apoplastic calcium levels plays a large role in initiating a physiological response in other tropisms, and it is hypothesized that a similar process occurs in hydrotropism. Calcium, auxin and ABA are all proposed signals for the initiation of hydrotropic root growth behavior.

== Misconceptions ==
- The greater growth of roots in moist soil zones than in dry soil zones is not usually a result of hydrotropism. Hydrotropism requires a root to bend from a drier to a wetter soil zone. Roots require water to grow so roots that happen to be in moist soil will grow and branch much more than those in dry soil.
- Roots cannot sense water inside intact pipes via hydrotropism and break the pipes to obtain the water.
- Roots cannot sense water several feet away via hydrotropism and grow toward it. At best hydrotropism probably operates over distances of a couple millimeters″
