= Root cap =

Tissue at the tip of a plant root

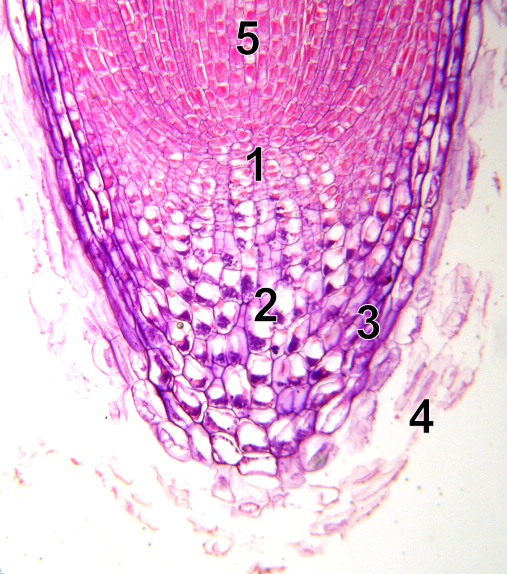
Root tip magnified 100×. 1. Meristem 2. Columellae (statocytes with statolithes) 3. Lateral part of the tip 4. Dead cells 5. Elongation zone

The root cap (also called the calyptra) is a small but multitasking organ that covers the very tip of every growing plant root. It shields the delicate apical meristem from mechanical damage, lubricates the root's passage through soil, and houses specialised gravity-sensing cells that guide the root's overall direction of growth.

== Structure and function ==
Root caps contain statocytes (gravity-sensing cells) whose dense statoliths settle in response to gravity; if the cap is carefully removed a root loses its orientation and grows at random. The cap also secretes a layer of mucilage that reduces friction and may foster signalling with the surrounding soil microbiota. Because of its sensor cells, the organ underpins gravitropism (sometimes called geoperception), helping the root grow downwards with gravity or reorient upwards against it.

== Development and turnover ==
The root cap is renewed continuously. Stem-cell files on its inner face divide to generate successive layers of columella and lateral root-cap cells; as the root advances, the oldest outer layers are sloughed off so the organ maintains a steady size. In cereals and many legumes these discarded layers separate as long-lived "border cells", whereas in Arabidopsis thaliana most surface cells undergo rapid, developmentally-programmed cell death before shedding.

== Sensory roles and variation ==
Beyond sensing gravity, the cap acts as a broader signalling hub. Asymmetric redistribution of the plant hormone auxin in its statolith-bearing cells initiates curvature that restores the root to the gravity vector; related pathways also mediate water-seeking (hydrotropism) and help position future lateral roots, shaping overall root-system architecture.

A true root cap is absent in some parasitic plants and several aquatic plants, which instead form a thin, sac-like root pocket that performs a reduced protective role.
