= Reginald Henry Painter =

American entomologist

Reginald Henry Painter (12 September 1901 – 23 December 1968) was an American entomologist and agronomist who was a specialist on plant adaptations against insects and their use for agriculture. He outlined these ideas in the landmark textbook Insect Resistance in Crop Plants (1951), in which he identified three distinct mechanisms and popularized the idea of host-plant resistance in integrated pest management.

Painter was born in Brownwood, Texas and studied at Howard Payne College followed by the University of Texas from which he received his BS in 1922 and a MA in 1924. He then went to Ohio State University and received a Ph.D. in 1926. His research work was on the resistance of plants to insect attack and he pursued the idea of incorporating traits that increased host plant resistance to pest attack in the breeding of crop varieties. His landmark text on plant resistance to insects was Insect Resistance in Crop Plants (1951). In this book he identified three ways in which plants avoided insect damage by not being preferred, through anti-biosis (e.g. through toxicity to the insect) and by tolerating the damage caused by insects. Painter also introduced the phrase host-plant resistance which he defined as "characters that enable a plant to avoid, tolerate or recover from attacks of insects under conditions that would cause greater injury to other plants of the same species."

At Kansas State University, Painter helped breed wheat cultivars that were resistant to Hessian fly, stem borers, and aphids. Painter's technique was to scan heavily infested fields and select individual plants that appeared to stand up and select seeds from these for further breeding. Resistance for multiple pests has however always been a challenge to incorporate into a single variety.
