= Statocyte =

Gravity-sensing cells in higher plants

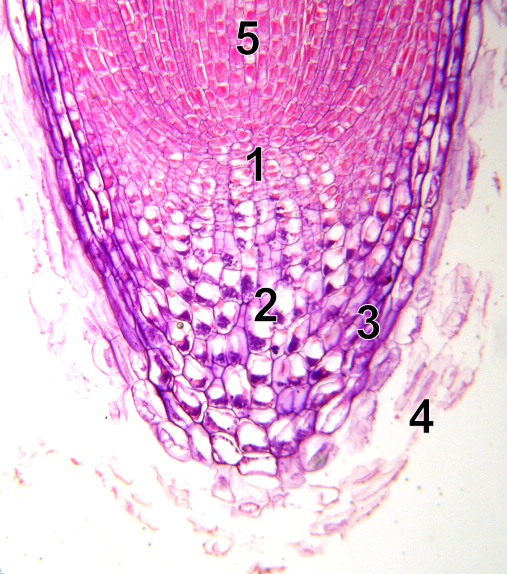
Root tip: 1. meristem 2. columella (statocytes with statoliths at the bottom of the cell) 3. side of the root cap 4. dead cells 5. cell elongation zone. Optical microscope 100x

Statocyte: 1.cell wall 2.endoplasmic reticulum 3.plasmodesma 4.cell nucleus 5.mitochondrion 6.cytoplasm 7.statolith 8.root 9.columella 10.statocyte

Statocytes are gravity-sensing (gravitropic) cells in higher plants. They contain amyloplasts-statoliths – starch-filled amyloplastic organelles – which are sediment at the lowest part of the cells. In the roots, sedimentation of the statoliths towards the lower part of the statocytes constitutes a signal for the production and redistribution of auxin. When stems or roots are not exactly aligned with the gravity, statoliths move and adjust to gravity. This is followed by a triggering of an asymmetrical distribution of auxin that causes the curvature and growth of stems against gravity, as well as growth of roots along the gravity vector. Statocytes are present in the elongating region of coleoptiles, shoots and inflorescence stems. In roots, the root cap is the only place where sedimentation is observed, and only the central columella cells of the root cap serve as gravity-sensing statocytes. They can initiate differential growth patterns, bending the root towards the vertical axis.

With optical microscopy and the right fixation technique, it is possible to observe the cells in the root tip, where statocytes containing statoliths are situated in the root cap. The statoliths have sunk to the lowest part of the cell where they make contact with the plasma membrane. It is this contact that might be responsible for triggering the release or redistribution of auxin, although the exact molecular mechanisms by which the accumulation of statoliths at the bottom of the cell regulates the distribution of auxin are not yet fully understood. A uniform concentration of auxin causes the root to grow straight down. This is a form of positive gravitropism where the root grows along the gravity vector. Should the root lie horizontally, then the statoliths will displace sideways to the cell membrane and induce a change in auxin distribution that triggers the root to bend and grow straight down.

== See also ==
- Prolonged sine
