= Inducible plant defenses against herbivory =

Plant defense mechanism activated as required

Plants have evolved many defense mechanisms against insect herbivory in the 350 million years in which they have co-evolved. Such defenses can be broadly classified into two categories: (1) permanent, constitutive defenses, and (2) temporary, inducible defenses. These differ in that constitutive defenses are present before an herbivore attacks, while induced defenses are activated only when attacks occur. In addition to constitutive defenses, initiation of specific defense responses to herbivory is an important strategy for plant persistence and survival.

== Benefits of induced defences ==
Inducible defenses allow plants to be phenotypically plastic. This may confer an advantage over constitutive defenses for multiple reasons. First, it may reduce the chance that attacking insects adapt to plant defenses. Simply, inducible defenses cause variations in the defense constituents of a plant, thereby making the plant a more unpredictable environment for insect herbivores. This variability has an important effect on the fitness and behaviour of herbivores. For example, the study of herbivory on radish (Raphanus sativus) by the cabbage looper caterpillar (Trichoplusia ni) demonstrated that the variation of defensive chemicals (glucosinolates) in R. sativus, due to induction, resulted in a significant decrease in the pupation rates of T. ni. In essence, defensive chemicals can be viewed as having a particular dosage-dependent effect on herbivores: it has little detrimental effect on herbivores when present at a low or moderate dose, but has dramatic effects at higher concentrations. Hence, a plant which produces variable levels of defensive chemicals is better defended than one that always produces the mean level of toxin.

Second, synthesizing a continually high level of defensive chemicals renders a cost to the plant. This is particularly the case where the presence of herbivorous insects is not always predictable. For example, the production of nicotine in cultivated tobacco (Nicotiana tabacum) has a function in plant defence. N. tabacum plants with a higher constitutive level of nicotine are less susceptible to insect herbivory. However, N. tabacum plants that produce a continually high level of nicotine flower significantly later than plants with lower levels of nicotine.

In addition to chemical defenses, herbivory can induce physical defenses, such as longer thorns, or indirect defenses, such as rewards for symbiotic ants.

== Cost of induced defences ==
Central to the concept of induced defences is the cost involved when stimulating such defences in the absence of insect herbivores. After all, in the absence of cost, selection is expected to favour the most defended genotype. Accordingly, individual plants will only do so when there is a need to. The cost of induced defences to a plant can be quantified as the resource-based trade-off between resistance and fitness (allocation cost) or as the reduced fitness resulting from the interactions with other species or the environment (ecological cost).

Allocation cost is related to the channelling of a large quantity fitness-limited resources to form resistance traits in plants. Such resources might not be quickly recycled and thus, are unavailable for fitness-relevant process such as growth and reproduction. For instance, herbivory on the broadleaf dock (Rumex obtusifolius) by the green dock beetle (Gastrophysa viridula) induces an increased activity in cell wall-bound peroxidase. The allocation of resources to this increased activity results in reduced leaf growth and expansion in R. obtusifolius. In the absence of herbivory, inducing such a defence would be ultimately costly to the plant in terms of development.

Ecological cost results from the disruption of the many symbiotic relationships that a plant has with the environment. For example, jasmonic acid can be used to simulate an herbivore attack on plants and thus, induce plant defences. The use of jasmonic acid on tomato (Lycopersicon esculentum) resulted in plants with fewer but larger fruits, longer ripening time, delayed fruit-set, fewer seeds per plant and fewer seeds per unit of fruit weight. All these features play a critical role in attracting seed dispersers. Due to the consequences of induced defences on fruit characteristics, L. esculentum are less able to attract seed dispersers and this ultimately results in a reduced fitness.

== Sensing herbivory attack ==
Induced defences require plant sensing the nature of injury, such as wounding from herbivore attack as opposed to wounding from mechanical damage. Plants therefore use a variety of cues, including the sense of touch, and salivary enzymes of the attacking herbivore. For example, in a study to test whether plants can distinguish mechanical damage from insect herbivory attack, Korth and Dixon (1997) discovered that the accumulation of induce defence transcription products occurred more rapidly in potato (Solanum tuberosum L.) leaves chewed on by caterpillars than in leaves damaged mechanically. Distinct signal transduction pathway are activated in response either to insect damage or mechanical damage in plants. While chemicals released in wounding responses are the same in both cases, the pathway in which they accumulate are separate. Not all herbivore attack begins with feeding, but with insects laying eggs on the plant. The adults of butterflies and moths (order Lepidoptera), for example, do not feed on plants directly, but lay eggs on plants which are suitable food for their larva. In such cases, plants have been demonstrated to induce defences upon contact from the ovipositing of insects.

== A mechanism of defence induction: changes in gene transcription rates ==
Systemically induced defences are at least in some cases the result of changes in the transcription rates of genes in a plant. Genes involved in this process may differ between species, but common to all plants is that systemically induced defences occur as a result of changes in gene expression. The changes in transcription can involve genes which either do not encode products involved in insect resistance, or are involved in general response to stress. In cultivated tobacco (Nicotiana tobacum) photosynthetic genes are down-regulated, while genes directly involved in defences are up-regulated in response to insect attack. This allows more resources to be allocated to producing proteins directly involved in the resistance response. A similar response was reported in Arabidopsis plants where there is an up-regulation of all genes that are involved in defence. Such changes in the transcription rates are essential in inducing a change in the level of defence upon herbivory attack.

=== Classification of induced genes ===
Not all up-regulated genes in induced defences are directly involved in the production of toxins. The genes encoding newly synthesised proteins after a herbivory attack can be categorised based on the function of their transcriptional products. There are three broad classification categories: defence genes, signalling pathway genes and rerouting genes. The transcription of defensive gene produces either proteins that are directly involved in plant defence such as proteinase inhibitors or are enzymes that are essential for the production of such proteins. Signalling pathway genes are involved in transmitting the stimulus from the wounded regions to organs where defence genes are transcribed. These genes are essential in plants due to the constraints in the vascular systems of the plants. Finally, rerouting genes are responsible in allocating resources for metabolism from primary metabolites involved in photosynthesis and survival to defence genes.

== See also ==
- Plant tolerance to herbivory
