= Plant defense against herbivory =

Evolutionary mechanism

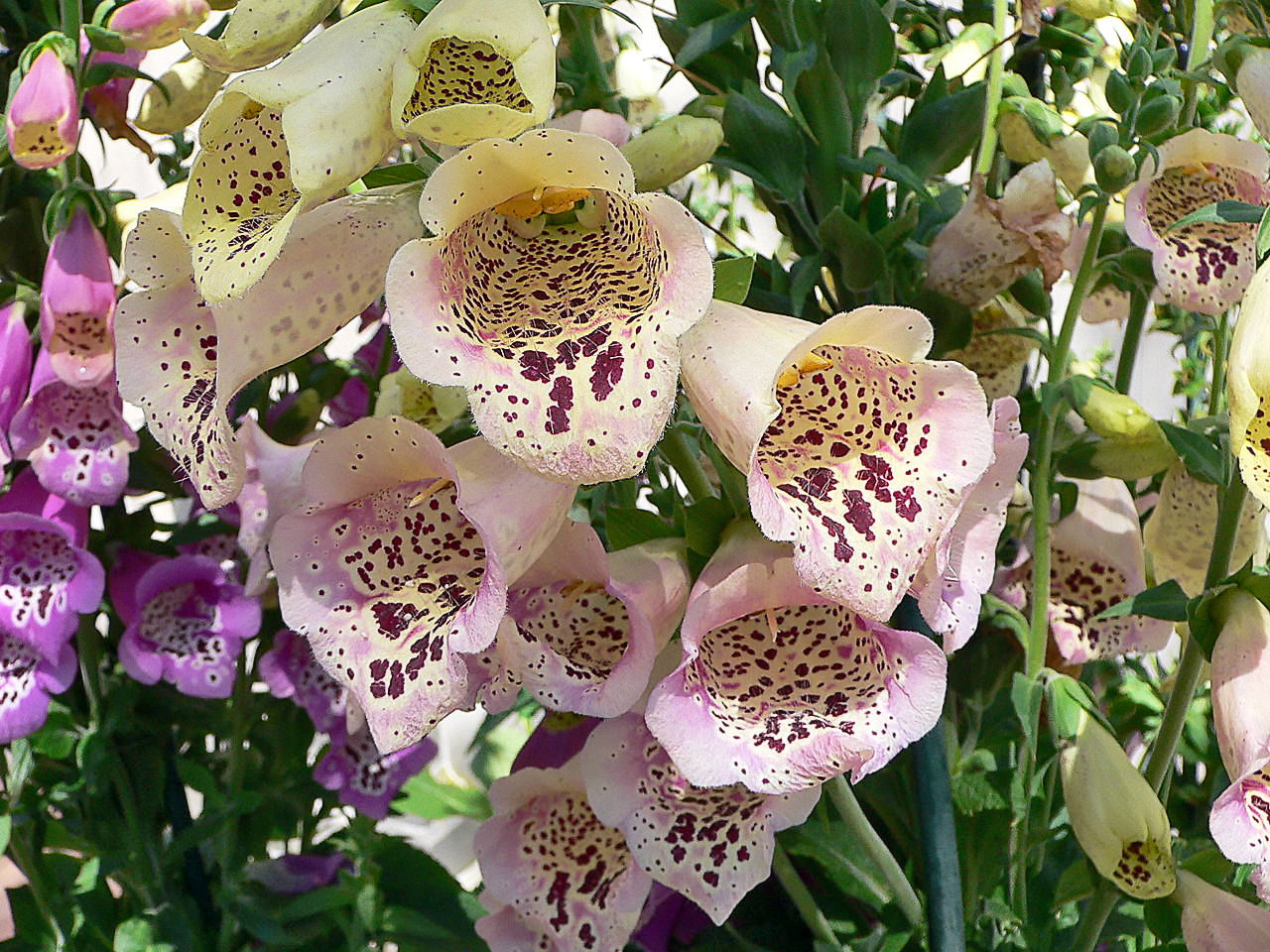
Foxgloves produce toxic chemicals such as digoxin in order to deter herbivory.

Plant defense against herbivory or host-plant resistance is a range of adaptations evolved by plants which improve their survival and reproduction by reducing the impact of herbivores. Many plants produce secondary metabolites, known as allelochemicals, that influence the behavior, growth, or survival of herbivores. These chemical defenses can act as repellents or toxins to herbivores or reduce plant digestibility. Another defensive strategy of plants is changing their attractiveness. Plants can sense being touched, and they can respond with strategies to defend against herbivores. Plants alter their appearance by changing their size or quality in a way that prevents overconsumption by large herbivores, reducing the rate at which they are consumed.

Other defensive strategies used by plants include escaping or avoiding herbivores at any time in any place – for example, by growing in a location where plants are not easily found or accessed by herbivores or by changing seasonal growth patterns. Another approach diverts herbivores toward eating non-essential parts or enhances the ability of a plant to recover from the damage caused by herbivory. Some plants support the presence of natural enemies of herbivores, which protect the plant. Each type of defense can be either constitutive (always present in the plant) or induced (produced in reaction to damage or stress caused by herbivores).

Historically, insects have been the most significant herbivores, and the evolution of land plants is closely associated with the evolution of insects. While most plant defenses are directed against insects, other defenses have evolved that are aimed at vertebrate herbivores, such as birds and mammals. The study of plant defenses against herbivory is important from an evolutionary viewpoint; for the direct impact that these defenses have on agriculture, including human and livestock food sources; as beneficial 'biological control agents' in biological pest control programs; and in the search for plants of medical importance.

== Evolution of defensive traits ==
Timeline of plant evolution and the beginnings of different modes of insect herbivory

=== Land plants ===
The earliest land plants evolved from aquatic plants around 450 million years ago (Ma) in the Ordovician period. Many plants have adapted to an iodine-deficient terrestrial environment by removing iodine from their metabolism; in fact, iodine is essential only for animal cells. An important antiparasitic action is caused by the blockage in the transport of iodide of animal cells, inhibiting sodium-iodide symporter (NIS). Many plant pesticides are glycosides (such as cardiac digitoxin) and cyanogenic glycosides that liberate cyanide, which, by blocking cytochrome c oxidase and NIS, is poisonous only for a large part of parasites and herbivores and not for the plant cells, in which it seems useful in the seed dormancy phase. Iodide is not itself a pesticide, but is oxidized by vegetable peroxidase to iodine, which is a strong oxidant able to kill bacteria, fungi, and protozoa.

The Cretaceous period saw the appearance of more plant defense mechanisms. The diversification of flowering plants (angiosperms) at that time is associated with the sudden burst of speciation in insects. This diversification of insects represented a major selective force in plant evolution and led to the selection of plants that had defensive adaptations. Early insect herbivores were mandibulate and bit or chewed vegetation, but the evolution of vascular plants led to the co-evolution of other forms of herbivory, such as sap-sucking, leaf mining, gall forming, and nectar-feeding.

The relative abundance of different species of plants in ecological communities including forests and grasslands may be determined in part by the level of defensive compounds in the different species. Since the cost of replacing damaged leaves is higher in conditions where resources are scarce, it may be that plants growing in areas where water and nutrients are scarce invest more resources into anti-herbivore defenses, resulting in slower plant growth.

=== Records of herbivores ===
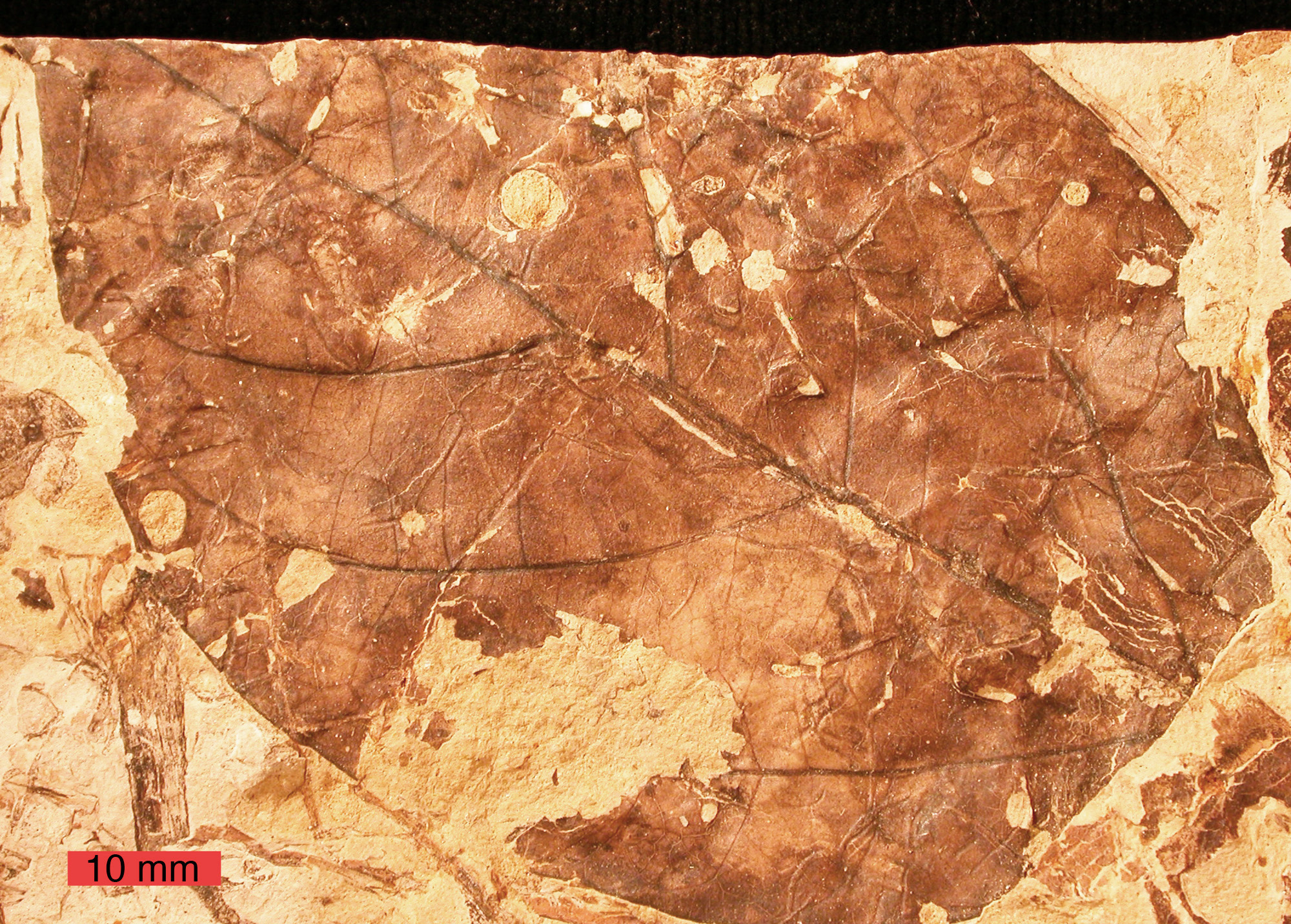
Viburnum lesquereuxii leaf with insect damage; Dakota Sandstone (Cretaceous) of Ellsworth County, Kansas. Scale bar is 10 mm.

Knowledge of herbivory in geological time comes from three sources: fossilized plants, which may preserve evidence of defense (such as spines) or herbivory-related damage; the observation of plant debris in fossilised animal feces; and the structure of herbivore mouthparts.

Long thought to be a Mesozoic phenomenon, evidence for herbivory is found almost as soon as fossils can show it. As previously discussed, the first land plants emerged around 450 million years ago; however, herbivory, and therefore the need for plant defenses, undoubtedly evolved among aquatic organisms in ancient lakes and oceans. Within 20 million years of the first fossils of sporangia and stems towards the close of the Silurian, around 420 million years ago, there is evidence that plants were being consumed. Animals fed on the spores of early Devonian plants, and the Rhynie chert provides evidence that organisms fed on plants using a "pierce and suck" technique.

During the ensuing 75 million years, plants evolved a range of more complex organs, from roots to seeds. There was a gap of 50 to 100 million years between each organ's evolution and its being eaten. Hole feeding and skeletonization are recorded in the early Permian, with surface fluid feeding evolving by the end of that period.

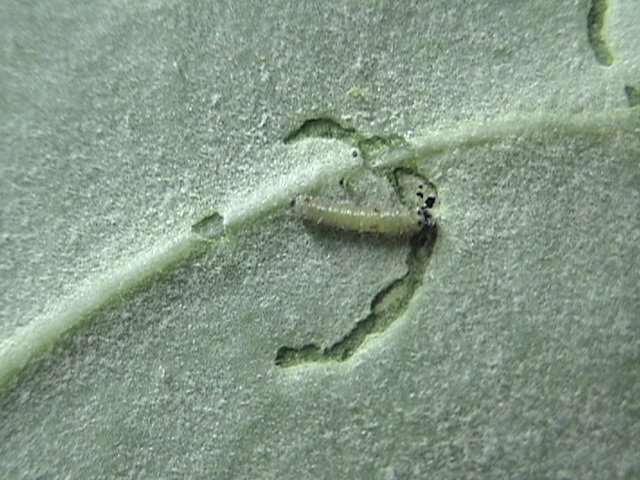
A plain tiger Danaus chrysippus caterpillar making a moat to block defensive chemicals of Calotropis before feeding

=== Co-evolution ===
Herbivores are dependent on plants for food and have evolved mechanisms to obtain this food despite the evolution of a diverse arsenal of plant defenses. Herbivore adaptations to plant defense have been likened to offensive traits and consist of adaptations that allow increased feeding and use of a host plant. Relationships between herbivores and their host plants often result in reciprocal evolutionary change, called co-evolution. When an herbivore eats a plant, it selects for plants that can mount a defensive response. In cases where this relationship demonstrates specificity (the evolution of each trait is due to the other) and reciprocity (both traits must evolve), the species are thought to have co-evolved.

The "escape and radiation" mechanism for co-evolution presents the idea that adaptations in herbivores and their host plants have been the driving force behind speciation and have played a role in the radiation of insect species during the age of angiosperms. Some herbivores have evolved ways to hijack plant defenses to their own benefit by sequestering these chemicals and using them to protect themselves from predators. Plant defenses against herbivores are generally not complete, so plants tend to evolve some tolerance to herbivory.

== Types ==
=== Constitutive and induced defenses ===
Plant defenses can be classified as constitutive or induced. Constitutive defenses are always present, while induced defenses are produced or mobilized to the site where a plant is injured. There is wide variation in the composition and concentration of constitutive defenses; these range from mechanical defenses to digestibility reducers and toxins. Many external mechanical defenses and quantitative defenses are constitutive, as they require large amounts of resources to produce and are costly to mobilize. A variety of molecular and biochemical approaches are used to determine the mechanisms of constitutive and induced defensive responses.

Induced defenses include secondary metabolites and morphological and physiological changes. An advantage of inducible, as opposed to constitutive defenses, is that they are only produced when needed, and are therefore potentially less costly, especially when herbivory is variable. Modes of induced defence include systemic acquired resistance and plant-induced systemic resistance.

=== Chemical defenses ===
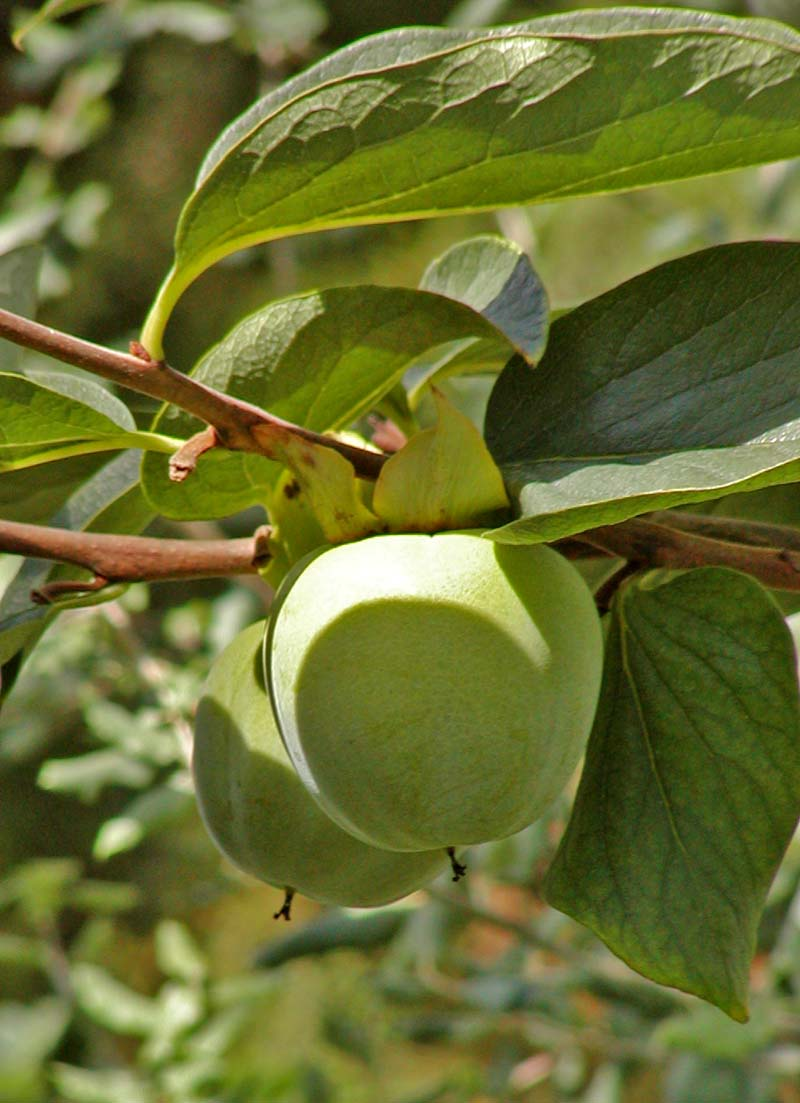
Persimmon, genus Diospyros, has a high tannin content which gives immature fruit, seen above, an astringent and bitter flavor.

The evolution of chemical defenses in plants is linked to the emergence of chemical substances that are not involved in the essential photosynthetic and metabolic activities. These substances, secondary metabolites, are organic compounds that are not directly involved in the normal growth, development or reproduction of organisms, and often produced as by-products during the synthesis of primary metabolic products. Examples of these byproducts include phenolics, flavonoids, and tannins. Although these secondary metabolites have been thought to play a major role in defenses against herbivores, a meta-analysis of recent relevant studies has suggested that they have either a more minimal (when compared to other non-secondary metabolites, such as primary chemistry and physiology) or more complex involvement in defense.

Plants can communicate through the air. Pheromone release and other scents can be detected by leaves and regulate plant immune response. In other words, plants produce volatile organic compounds (VOC) to warn other plants of danger and change their behavioral state to better respond to threats and survival. These warning signals produced by infected neighboring trees allow the undamaged trees to activate the necessary defense mechanisms. Within the plant itself, it transmits warning, nonvolatile signals as well as airborne signals to surrounding undamaged trees to strengthen their defense/immune system. For instance, poplar and sugar maple trees demonstrated that they received tannins from nearby damaged trees. In sagebrush, damaged plants send out airborne compounds, such as methyl jasmonate, to undamaged plants to increase proteinase inhibitor production and resistance to herbivory.

The release of unique VOCs and extrafloral nectar (EFN) allow plants to protect themselves against herbivores by attracting animals from the third trophic level. For example, caterpillar-damaged plants guide parasitic wasps to prey on victims through the release of chemical signals. The sources of these compounds are most likely from glands in the leaves which are ruptured upon the chewing of an herbivore. The injury by herbivores induces the release of linolenic acid and other enzymatic reactions in an octadecanoid cascade, leading to the synthesis of jasmonic acid, a hormone which plays a central role in regulating immune responses. Jasmonic acid induces the release of VOCs and EFN which attract parasitic wasps and predatory mites to detect and feed on herbivores. These volatile organic compounds can also be released to other nearby plants to be prepared for the potential threats. The volatile compounds emitted by plants are easily detected by third trophic level organisms as these signals are unique to herbivore damage. An experiment conducted to measure the VOCs from growing plants shows that signals are released instantaneously upon the herbivory damage and slowly dropped after the damage stopped. It was also observed that plants release the strongest signals during the time of day which animals tend to forage.

Since trees are sessile, they have established unique internal defense systems. For instance, when some trees experience herbivory, they release compounds that make their vegetation less palatable. The herbivore saliva left on the leaves of the tree sends a chemical signal to the tree's cells. The tree cells respond by increasing the concentration of salicylic acid (hormone) production. Salicylic acid is a phytohormone that is one of the essential hormones for regulating plants' immune systems. This hormone then signals to increase the production of tree chemicals called tannins within its leaves.

==== Antiherbivory compounds ====
Plants have evolved many secondary metabolites involved in plant defense, which are collectively known as antiherbivory compounds and can be classified into three sub-groups: nitrogen compounds (including alkaloids, cyanogenic glycosides, glucosinolates and benzoxazinoids), terpenoids, and phenolics.

Alkaloids are derived from various amino acids. Over 3,000 alkaloids are known, including nicotine, caffeine, morphine, cocaine, colchicine, ergolines, strychnine, and quinine. Alkaloids have pharmacological effects on humans and other animals. Some alkaloids can inhibit or activate enzymes, or alter carbohydrate and fat storage by inhibiting the formation phosphodiester bonds involved in their breakdown. Certain alkaloids bind to nucleic acids and can inhibit synthesis of proteins and affect DNA repair mechanisms. Alkaloids can also affect cell membrane and cytoskeletal structure causing the cells to weaken, collapse, or leak, and can affect nerve transmission. Although alkaloids act on a diversity of metabolic systems in humans and other animals, they almost uniformly invoke an aversively bitter taste.

Cyanogenic glycosides are stored in inactive forms in plant vacuoles. They become toxic when herbivores eat the plant and break cell membranes allowing the glycosides to come into contact with enzymes in the cytoplasm releasing hydrogen cyanide which blocks cellular respiration. Glucosinolates are activated in much the same way as cyanogenic glucosides, and the products can cause gastroenteritis, salivation, diarrhea, and irritation of the mouth. Benzoxazinoids, such as DIMBOA, are secondary defence metabolites characteristic of certain grasses (Poaceae). Like cyanogenic glycosides, they are stored as inactive glucosides in the plant vacuole. Upon tissue disruption they get into contact with β-glucosidases from the chloroplasts, which enzymatically release the toxic aglucones. Whereas some benzoxazinoids are constitutively present, others are only synthesized following herbivore infestation, and thus, considered inducible plant defenses against herbivory.

The terpenoids, sometimes referred to as isoprenoids, are organic chemicals similar to terpenes, derived from five-carbon isoprene units. There are over 10,000 known types of terpenoids. Most are multicyclic structures which differ from one another in both functional groups, and in basic carbon skeletons. Monoterpenoids, containing 2 isoprene units, are volatile essential oils such as citronella, limonene, menthol, camphor, and pinene. Diterpenoids, 4 isoprene units, are widely distributed in latex and resins, and can be quite toxic. Diterpenes are responsible for making Rhododendron leaves poisonous. Plant steroids and sterols are also produced from terpenoid precursors, including vitamin D, glycosides (such as digitalis) and saponins (which lyse red blood cells of herbivores).

Phenolics, sometimes called phenols, consist of an aromatic 6-carbon ring bonded to a hydroxy group. Some phenols have antiseptic properties, while others disrupt endocrine activity. Phenolics range from simple tannins to the more complex flavonoids that give plants much of their red, blue, yellow, and white pigments. Complex phenolics called polyphenols are capable of producing many different types of effects on humans, including antioxidant properties. Some examples of phenolics used for defense in plants are: lignin, silymarin and cannabinoids. Condensed tannins, polymers composed of 2 to 50 (or more) flavonoid molecules, inhibit herbivore digestion by binding to consumed plant proteins and making them more difficult for animals to digest, and by interfering with protein absorption and digestive enzymes.

In addition, some plants use fatty acid derivatives, amino acids and even peptides as defenses. The cholinergic toxin cicutoxin of water hemlock is a polyyne derived from the fatty acid metabolism. Oxalyldiaminopropionic acid is a neurotoxic amino acid produced as a defensive metabolite in the grass pea (Lathyrus sativus). The synthesis of fluoroacetate in several plants is an example of the use of small molecules to disrupt the metabolism of herbivores, in this case the citric acid cycle.

Plants interact by producing allelochemicals which interfere with the growth of other plants (allelopathy). These have a role in plant defense and may be used to suppress competitors such as weeds of crops. A result may be larger plants better able to survive damage by herbivores.

==== Enzymes ====
Premier examples are substances activated by the enzyme myrosinase. This enzyme converts glucosinolates to various compounds that are toxic to herbivorous insects. One product of this enzyme is allyl isothiocyanate, the pungent ingredient in horseradish sauces.

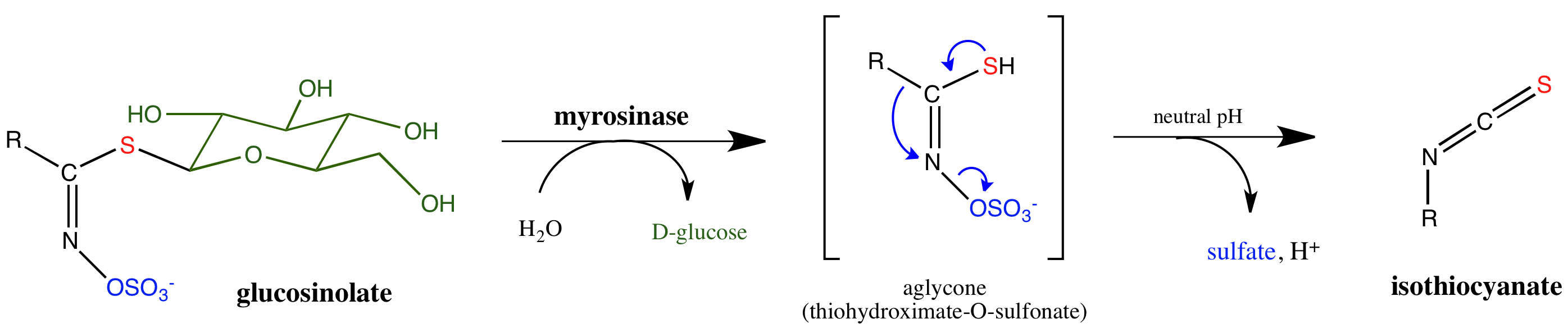
Biosynthesis of antifeedants by the action of myrosinase.

The myrosinase is released only upon crushing the flesh of horseradish. Since allyl isothiocyanate is harmful to the plant as well as the insect, it is stored in the harmless form of the glucosinolate, separate from the myrosinase enzyme.

=== Mechanical defenses ===
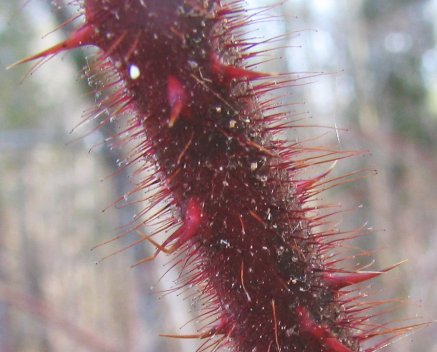
The prickles on the stem of this raspberry plant serve as a mechanical defense against herbivory.

See the review of mechanical defenses by Lucas et al., 2000, which remains relevant and well regarded in the subject as of 2018. Many plants have external structural defenses that discourage herbivory. Structural defenses can be described as morphological or physical traits that give the plant a fitness advantage by deterring herbivores from feeding. Depending on the herbivore's physical characteristics (i.e. size and defensive armor), plant structural defenses on stems and leaves can deter, injure, or kill the grazer. Some defensive compounds are produced internally but are released onto the plant's surface; for example, resins, lignins, silica, and wax cover the epidermis of terrestrial plants and alter the texture of the plant tissue. The leaves of holly plants, for instance, are very smooth and slippery making feeding difficult. Some plants produce gummosis or sap that traps insects.

==== Spines and thorns ====
A plant's leaves and stem may be covered with sharp prickles, spines, thorns or trichomes- hairs on the leaf often with barbs, sometimes containing irritants or poisons. Plant structural features such as spines, thorns and awns reduce feeding by large ungulate herbivores (e.g. kudu, impala, and goats) by restricting the herbivores' feeding rate, or by wearing down the molars. Trichomes are frequently associated with lower rates of plant tissue digestion by insect herbivores. Raphides are sharp needles of calcium oxalate or calcium carbonate in plant tissues, making ingestion painful, damaging a herbivore's mouth and gullet and causing more efficient delivery of the plant's toxins. The structure of a plant, its branching and leaf arrangement may also be evolved to reduce herbivore impact. The shrubs of New Zealand have evolved special wide-branching adaptations believed to be a response to browsing birds such as moas. Similarly, African Acacia trees have long spines low in the canopy, but very short spines in the high canopy, which is comparatively safe from herbivores such as giraffes.

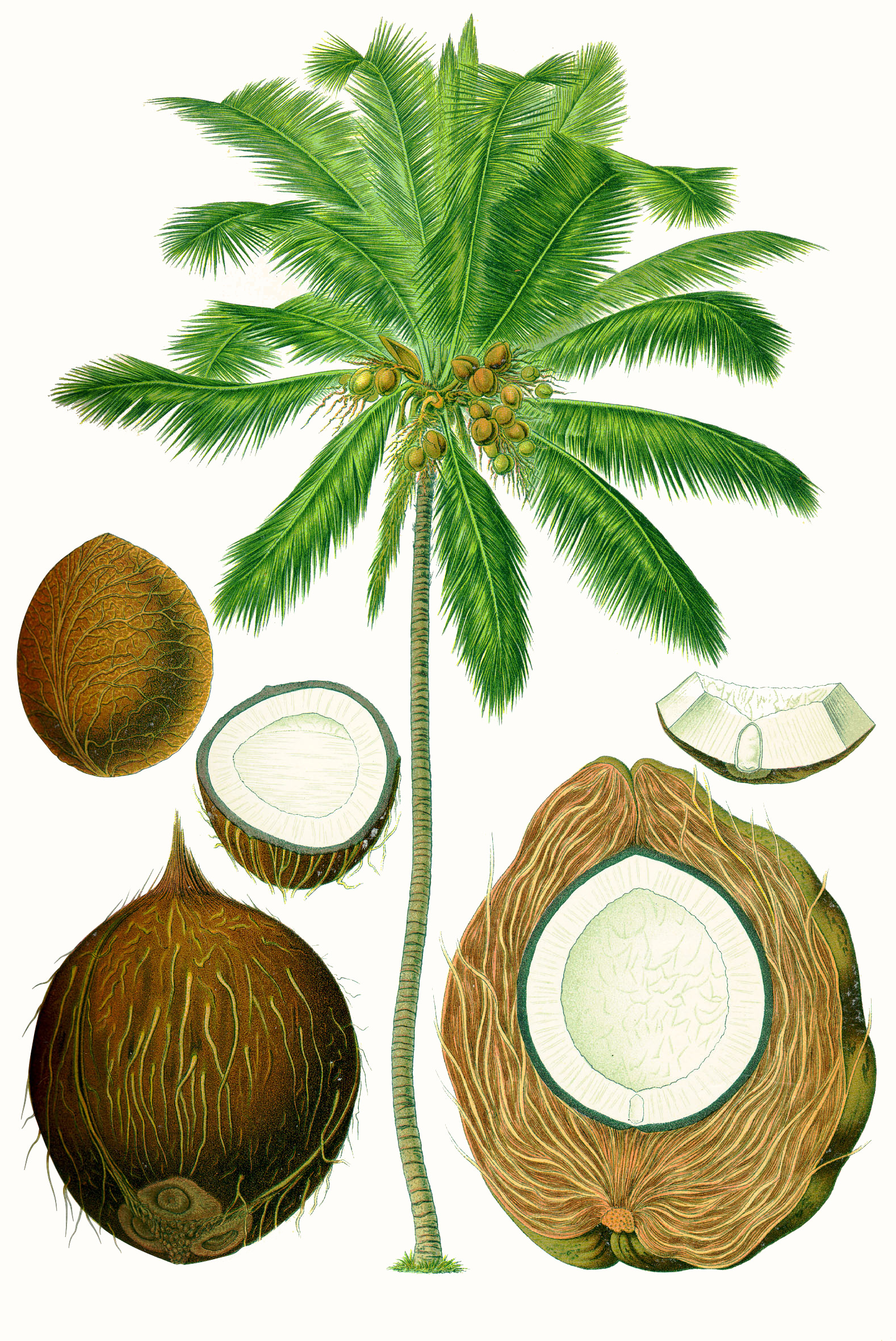
Coconut palms protect their fruit by surrounding it with multiple layers of armor.

Trees such as palms protect their fruit by multiple layers of armor, needing efficient tools to break through to the seed contents. Some plants, notably the grasses, use indigestible silica (and many plants use other relatively indigestible materials such as lignin) to defend themselves against vertebrate and invertebrate herbivores. Plants take up silicon from the soil and deposit it in their tissues in the form of solid silica phytoliths. These mechanically reduce the digestibility of plant tissue, causing rapid wear to vertebrate teeth and to insect mandibles, and are effective against herbivores above and below ground. The mechanism may offer future sustainable pest-control strategies.

==== Thigmonastic movements ====
Thigmonastic movements, those that occur in response to touch, are used as a defense in some plants. The leaves of the sensitive plant, Mimosa pudica, close up rapidly in response to direct touch, vibration, or even electrical and thermal stimuli. The proximate cause of this mechanical response is an abrupt change in the turgor pressure in the pulvini at the base of leaves resulting from osmotic phenomena. This is then spread via both electrical and chemical means through the plant; only a single leaflet need be disturbed. This response lowers the surface area available to herbivores, which are presented with the underside of each leaflet, and results in a wilted appearance. It may also physically dislodge small herbivores, such as insects.

=== Carnivorous plants ===
Carnivory in plants has evolved at least six times independently. Some examples include the Venus flytrap, pitcher plant, and butterwort. Many of these plants have evolved in nutrient-poor soil, and must procure nutrients from other sources. They use insects and small birds as a way to gain the minerals they need through carnivory. Carnivorous plants do not use carnivory as defense, but to get the nutrients they need.

=== Mimicry and camouflage ===
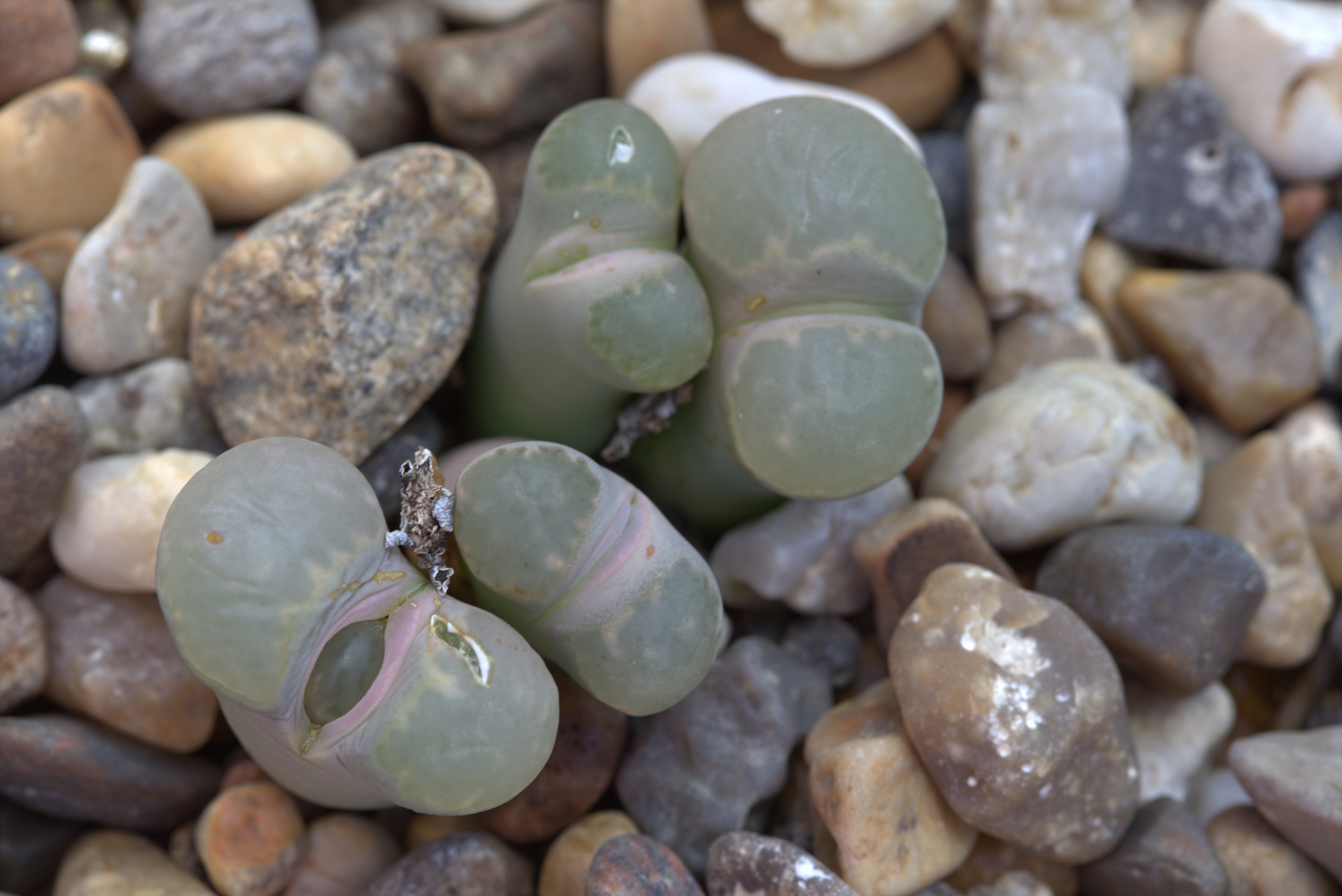
The cryptic Lithops salicola, a pebble plant, camouflaged as small stones, reducing the chance that it will be seen by herbivores

Some plants make use of various forms of mimicry to reduce herbivory. One mechanism is to mimic the presence of insect eggs on their leaves, dissuading insect species from laying their eggs there. Because female butterflies are less likely to lay their eggs on plants that already have butterfly eggs, some species of neotropical vines of the genus Passiflora (passion flowers) make use of Gilbertian mimicry: they possess physical structures resembling the yellow eggs of Heliconius butterflies on their leaves, which discourage oviposition by butterflies. Other plants make use of Batesian mimicry, with structures that imitate thorns or other objects to dissuade herbivores directly. A further approach is camouflage; the vine Boquila trifoliolata mimics the leaves of its host plant, while the pebble plant Lithops makes itself hard to spot among the stones of the Southern African environment.

=== Indirect defenses ===
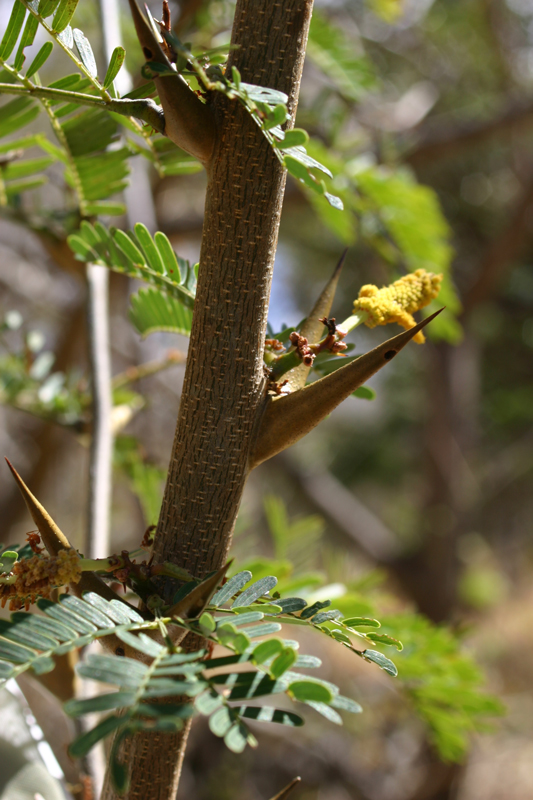
The large and directly defensive thornlike stipules of Vachellia collinsii are hollow and offer shelter for ants, which indirectly protect the plant against herbivores.

Another category of plant defenses are those features that indirectly protect the plant by enhancing the probability of attracting the natural enemies of herbivores. Such an arrangement is mutualistic, in this case of the "enemy of my enemy" variety. One such feature is the use of semiochemicals given off by plants. Semiochemicals are a group of volatile organic compounds involved in interactions between organisms. One group of semiochemicals are allelochemicals; consisting of allomones, which play a defensive role in interspecies communication, and kairomones, which are used by members of higher trophic levels to locate food sources. When a plant is attacked it releases allelochemics containing an abnormal ratio of these herbivore-induced plant volatiles (HIPVs). Predators sense these volatiles as food cues, attracting them to the damaged plant, and to feeding herbivores. The subsequent reduction in the number of herbivores confers a fitness benefit to the plant and demonstrates the indirect defensive capabilities of semiochemicals. Induced volatiles have drawbacks, however; some studies suggest that these volatiles attract herbivores. Crop domestication has increased yields, sometimes at the expense of HIPV production. Orre Gordon et al 2013 tests several methods of artificially restoring the plant-predator partnership, by combining companion planting and synthetic predator attractants. They describe several strategies which work and several which do not.

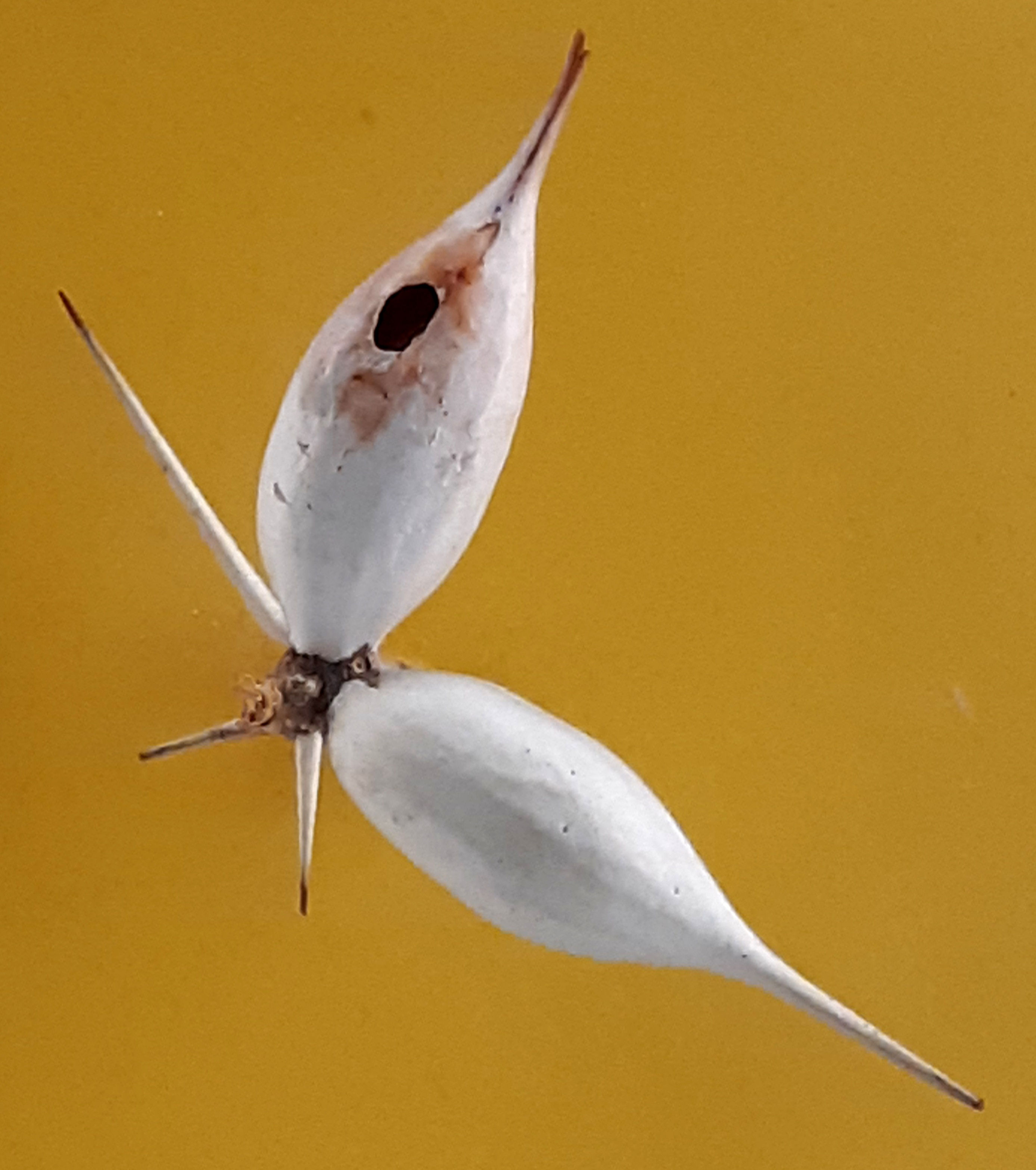
Domatia for symbiotic ants in swollen hollow spines of Vachellia seyal acacia

Plants sometimes provide housing and food items for natural enemies of herbivores, known as "biotic" defense mechanisms, to maintain their presence. For example, trees from the genus Macaranga have adapted their thin stem walls to create domatia, ideal housing for ants (genus Crematogaster), which, in turn, protect the plant from herbivores. In addition to providing housing, the plant also provides the ant with its exclusive food source; from the food bodies produced by the plant. Similarly, several Acacia tree species have developed stipular spines (direct defenses) that are swollen at the base, forming a hollow structure that provides housing for protective ants. These Acacia trees also produce nectar in extrafloral nectaries on their leaves as food for the ants.

Plant use of endophytic fungi in defense is common. Most plants have endophytes, microbial organisms that live within them. While some cause disease, others protect plants from herbivores and pathogenic microbes. Endophytes can help the plant by producing toxins harmful to other organisms that would attack the plant, such as alkaloid producing fungi which are common in grasses such as tall fescue (Festuca arundinacea), which is infected by Neotyphodium coenophialum.

Trees of the same species form alliances with other tree species to improve their survival rate. They communicate and have dependent relationships through connections below the soil called underground mycorrhiza networks, which allows them to share water/nutrients and various signals for predatory attacks while also protecting the immune system. Within a forest of trees, the ones getting attacked send communication distress signals that alerts neighboring trees to alter their behavior (defense). Trees and fungi have a symbiotic relationship: fungi, intertwined with the trees' roots, support communication between trees to locate nutrients; in return, the fungi receive some of the sugar that trees photosynthesize. Trees send out several forms of communication including chemical, hormonal, and slow pulsing electric signals. Farmers investigated the electrical signals between trees, using a voltage-based signal system, similar to an animal's nervous system, where a tree faces distress and releases a warning signal to surrounding trees.

=== Leaf shedding and color ===
There have been suggestions that leaf shedding may be a response that provides protection against diseases and certain kinds of pests such as leaf miners and gall forming insects. Other responses such as the change of leaf colors prior to fall have also been suggested as adaptations that may help undermine the camouflage of herbivores. Autumn leaf color has also been suggested to act as an honest warning signal of defensive commitment towards insect pests that migrate to the trees in autumn.

== Costs and benefits ==
Defensive structures and chemicals are costly as they require resources that could otherwise be used by plants to maximize growth and reproduction. In some situations, plant growth slows down when most of the nutrients are being used for the generation of toxins or regeneration of plant parts. Many models have been proposed to explore how and why some plants make this investment in defenses against herbivores.

=== Optimal defense hypothesis ===
The optimal defense hypothesis attempts to explain how the kinds of defenses a particular plant might use reflect the threats each individual plant faces. This model considers three main factors: risk of attack, value of the plant part, and the cost of defense.

The first factor determining optimal defense is risk: how likely is it that a plant or certain plant parts will be attacked? This is also related to the plant apparency hypothesis, which states that a plant will invest heavily in broadly effective defenses when the plant is easily found by herbivores. Examples of apparent plants that produce generalized protections include long-living trees, shrubs, and perennial grasses. Unapparent plants, such as short-lived plants of early successional stages, on the other hand, preferentially invest in small amounts of qualitative toxins that are effective against all but the most specialized herbivores.

The second factor is the value of protection: would the plant be less able to survive and reproduce after removal of part of its structure by a herbivore? Not all plant parts are of equal evolutionary value, thus valuable parts contain more defenses. A plant's stage of development at the time of feeding also affects the resulting change in fitness. Experimentally, the fitness value of a plant structure is determined by removing that part of the plant and observing the effect. In general, reproductive parts are not as easily replaced as vegetative parts, terminal leaves have greater value than basal leaves, and the loss of plant parts mid-season has a greater negative effect on fitness than removal at the beginning or end of the season. Seeds in particular tend to be very well protected. For example, the seeds of many edible fruits and nuts contain cyanogenic glycosides such as amygdalin. This results from the need to balance the effort needed to make the fruit attractive to animal dispersers while ensuring that the seeds are not destroyed by the animal.

The final consideration is cost: how much will a particular defensive strategy cost a plant in energy and materials? This is particularly important, as energy spent on defense cannot be used for other functions, such as reproduction and growth. The optimal defense hypothesis predicts that plants will allocate more energy towards defense when the benefits of protection outweigh the costs, specifically in situations where there is high herbivore pressure.

=== Carbon:nutrient balance hypothesis ===
The carbon:nutrient balance hypothesis, also known as the environmental constraint hypothesis or Carbon Nutrient Balance Model, states that the various types of plant defenses are responses to variations in the levels of nutrients in the environment. This hypothesis predicts the Carbon/Nitrogen ratio in plants determines which secondary metabolites will be synthesized. For example, plants growing in nitrogen-poor soils will use carbon-based defenses (mostly digestibility reducers), while those growing in low-carbon environments (such as shady conditions) are more likely to produce nitrogen-based toxins. The hypothesis further predicts that plants can change their defenses in response to changes in nutrients. For example, if plants are grown in low-nitrogen conditions, then these plants will implement a defensive strategy composed of constitutive carbon-based defenses. If nutrient levels subsequently increase, by for example the addition of fertilizers, these carbon-based defenses will decrease.

=== Growth rate hypothesis ===
The growth rate hypothesis, also known as the resource availability hypothesis, states that defense strategies are determined by the inherent growth rate of the plant, which is in turn determined by the resources available to the plant. A major assumption is that available resources are the limiting factor in determining the maximum growth rate of a plant species. This model predicts that the level of defense investment will increase as the potential of growth decreases. Additionally, plants in resource-poor areas, with inherently slow-growth rates, tend to have long-lived leaves and twigs, and the loss of plant appendages may result in a loss of scarce and valuable nutrients.

One test of this model involved a reciprocal transplants of seedlings of 20 species of trees between clay soils (nutrient rich) and white sand (nutrient poor) to determine whether trade-offs between growth rate and defenses restrict species to one habitat. When planted in white sand and protected from herbivores, seedlings originating from clay outgrew those originating from the nutrient-poor sand, but in the presence of herbivores the seedlings originating from white sand performed better, likely due to their higher levels of constitutive carbon-based defenses. These finding suggest that defensive strategies limit the habitats of some plants.

=== Growth-differentiation balance hypothesis ===
The growth-differentiation balance hypothesis states that plant defenses are a result of a tradeoff between "growth-related processes" and "differentiation-related processes" in different environments. Differentiation-related processes are defined as "processes that enhance the structure or function of existing cells (i.e. maturation and specialization)." A plant will produce chemical defenses only when energy is available from photosynthesis, and plants with the highest concentrations of secondary metabolites are the ones with an intermediate level of available resources.

=== Synthesis tradeoffs ===
The vast majority of plant resistances to herbivores are either unrelated to each other, or are positively correlated. However there are some negative correlations: In Pastinaca sativa's resistances to various biotypes of Depressaria pastinacella, because the secondary metabolites involved are negatively correlated with each other; and in the resistances of Diplacus aurantiacus.

In Brassica rapa, resistance to Peronospora parasitica and growth rate are negatively correlated.

=== Mutualism and overcompensation of plants ===
Many plants do not have secondary metabolites, chemical processes, or mechanical defenses to help them fend off herbivores. Instead, these plants rely on overcompensation (which is regarded as a form of mutualism) when they are attacked by herbivores. Overcompensation is defined as having higher fitness when attacked by a herbivore. This a mutual relationship; the herbivore is satisfied with a meal, while the plant starts growing the missing part quickly. These plants have a higher chance of reproducing, and their fitness is increased.

== Importance to humans ==
=== Agriculture ===
Crop plants can be bred for their ability to resist herbivory, thus protecting themselves from damage with reduced use of pesticides. In addition, biological pest control sometimes makes use of plant defenses to reduce crop damage by herbivores. Techniques include polyculture, the planting together of two or more species such as a primary crop and a secondary plant. This can allow the secondary plant's defensive chemicals to protect the crop planted with it.

The variation of plant susceptibility to pests was probably known even in the early stages of agriculture in humans. In historic times, the observation of such variations in susceptibility have provided solutions for major socio-economic problems. The hemipteran pest insect phylloxera was introduced from North America to France in 1860 and in 25 years it destroyed nearly a third (100,000 km^{2}) of French vineyards. Charles Valentine Riley noted that the American species Vitis labrusca was resistant to Phylloxera. Riley, with J. E. Planchon, helped save the French wine industry by suggesting the grafting of the susceptible but high quality grapes onto Vitis labrusca root stocks. The formal study of plant resistance to herbivory was first covered extensively in 1951 by Reginald Henry Painter, who is widely regarded as the founder of this area of research, in his book Plant Resistance to Insects. While this work pioneered further research in the US, the work of Chesnokov was the basis of further research in the USSR.

Fresh growth of grass is sometimes high in prussic acid content and can cause poisoning of grazing livestock. The production of cyanogenic chemicals in grasses is primarily a defense against herbivores.

The human innovation of cooking may have been particularly helpful in overcoming many of the defensive chemicals of plants. Many enzyme inhibitors in cereal grains and pulses, such as trypsin inhibitors prevalent in pulse crops, are denatured by cooking, making them digestible.

It has been known since the late 17th century that plants contain noxious chemicals which are avoided by insects. These chemicals have been used by man as early insecticides; in 1690 nicotine was extracted from tobacco and used as a contact insecticide. In 1773, insect infested plants were treated with nicotine fumigation by heating tobacco and blowing the smoke over the plants. The flowers of Chrysanthemum species contain pyrethrin which is a potent insecticide. In later years, the applications of plant resistance became an important area of research in agriculture and plant breeding, particularly because they can serve as a safe and low-cost alternative to the use of pesticides. The important role of secondary plant substances in plant defense was described in the late 1950s by Vincent Dethier and G.S. Fraenkel. The use of botanical pesticides is widespread, including azadirachtin from the neem (Azadirachta indica), d-Limonene from Citrus species, rotenone from Derris, capsaicin from chili pepper, and pyrethrum from Chrysanthemum.

The selective breeding of crop plants often involves selection against the plant's intrinsic resistance strategies. This makes crop plant varieties particularly susceptible to pests unlike their wild relatives. In breeding for host-plant resistance, it is often the wild relatives that provide the source of resistance genes. These genes are incorporated using conventional approaches to plant breeding, but have been augmented by recombinant techniques, which allow introduction of genes from completely unrelated organisms. The most famous transgenic approach is the introduction of genes from the bacterial species, Bacillus thuringiensis, into plants. The bacterium produces proteins that, when ingested, kill lepidopteran caterpillars. The gene encoding for these highly toxic proteins, when introduced into the host plant genome so that it produces the same toxic proteins, confers resistance against caterpillars. This approach is controversial, however, due to the possibility of ecological and toxicological side effects.

=== Pharmaceutical ===
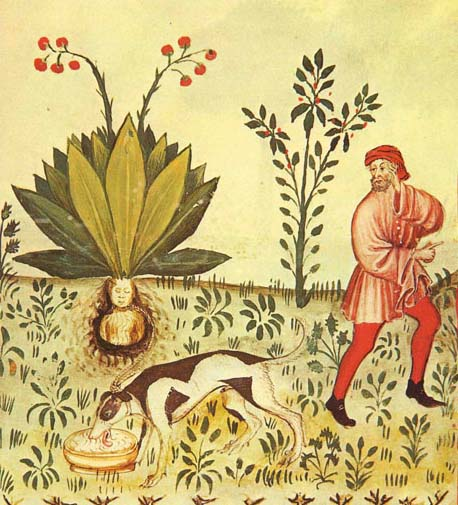
Illustration from the 15th-century manuscript Tacuinum Sanitatis detailing the beneficial and harmful properties of Mandrakes

Many currently available pharmaceuticals are derived from the secondary metabolites plants use to protect themselves from herbivores, including opium, aspirin, cocaine, and atropine. These chemicals have evolved to affect the biochemistry of insects in very specific ways. However, many of these biochemical pathways are conserved in vertebrates, including humans, and the chemicals act on human biochemistry in ways similar to that of insects. It has therefore been suggested that the study of plant-insect interactions may help in bioprospecting.

There is evidence that humans began using plant alkaloids in medical preparations as early as 3000 B.C. Although the active components of most medicinal plants have been isolated only relatively recently (beginning in the early 19th century) these substances have been used as drugs throughout the human history in potions, medicines, teas and as poisons. For example, to combat herbivory by the larvae of some Lepidoptera species, Cinchona trees produce a variety of alkaloids, the most familiar of which is quinine, which is extremely bitter, making the bark of the tree quite unpalatable.

Throughout history mandrakes (Mandragora officinarum) have been highly sought after for their reputed aphrodisiac properties. However, the roots of the mandrake plant also contain large quantities of the alkaloid scopolamine, which, at high doses, acts as a central nervous system depressant, and makes the plant highly toxic to herbivores. Scopolamine was later found to be medicinally used for pain management prior to and during labor; in smaller doses it is used to prevent motion sickness. One of the best-known medicinally valuable terpenes is an anticancer drug, taxol, isolated from the bark of the Pacific yew, Taxus brevifolia, in the early 1960s.

== See also ==
- Anti-predator adaptation
- Biopesticide
- Chemical ecology
- List of beneficial weeds
- List of companion plants
- List of pest-repelling plants
- Phytosemiotics
- Plant disease resistance
- Plant secondary metabolism
- Plant tolerance to herbivory
- Plant communication
- Tritrophic interactions in plant defense
