= SS Wairuna =

German cargo steamship launched in 1913

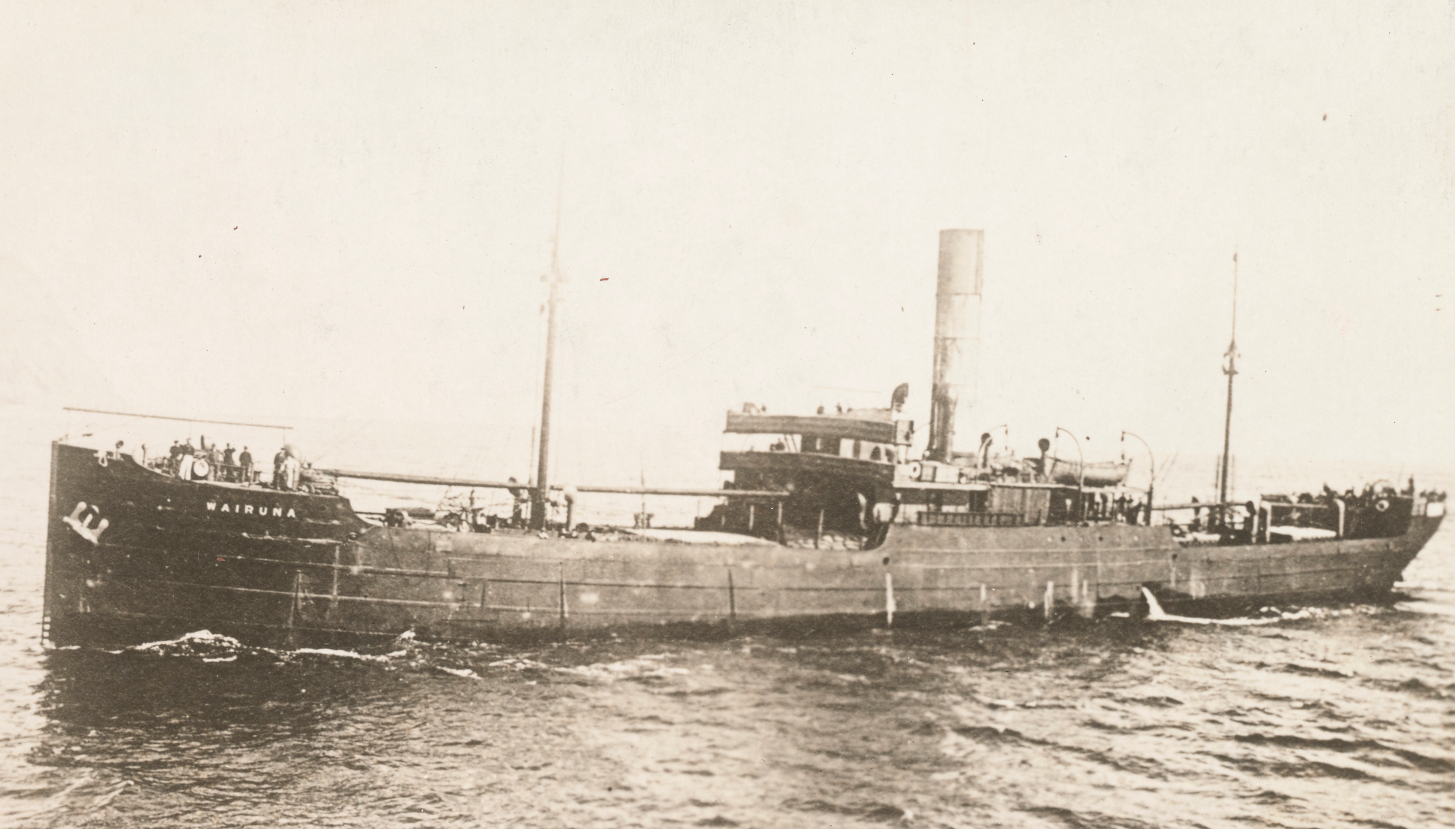
- The "Wairuna" during World War 1

History
- Name: D/S Schneefels (1914); SS Gibraltar (1914–16); SS Polescar (1916–19); SS Wairuna (1919–45)
- Namesake: the British territory of Gibraltar (1914–16); Wairuna in the Otago region of South Island, New Zealand (1919–45)
- Owner: DDG Hansa (1914); UK Government (1914–19); British-India Steam Navigation Co; Union Steam Ship Co (1919–45); MoWT (1945)
- Operator: DDG Hansa (1914); Houlder, Middleton & Co (1916–17); G Heyn & Sons (1917–19); Union Steam Ship Co (1919–45); J&J Denholm (1945)
- Port of registry: (Germany) Bremen (1914); (United Kingdom) (1914–19); (United Kingdom) London (1919–45)
- Builder: Flensburger Schiffbau-Gesellschaft
- Yard number: 334
- Launched: 13 November 1913
- Completed: 1 January 1914
- Out of service: 30 October 1945
- Identification: signal code QKJS (1914): UK Official Number 132926 (1919–45); signal code TQVF (1919–45): signal code GNXR (1945):
- Fate: scuttled

General characteristics
- Type: Cargo ship
- Tonnage: 5,832 GRT; tonnage under deck 5,478; 3,642 NRT; 8,875 DWT
- Length: 420 ft (130 m)
- Beam: 56.2 ft (17.1 m)
- Draught: 25.9 ft (7.9 m)
- Depth: 29.6 ft (9.0 m)
- Installed power: 530 NHP; 2,300 ihp
- Propulsion: 3-cylinder triple expansion steam engine; single screw
- Speed: 11.5 knots (21.3 km/h); or 12 knots (22 km/h)
- Crew: 72

SS Wairuna, originally called D/S Schneefels, then SS Gibraltar and SS Polescar, was a cargo steamship that was launched in Germany in 1913. She had a varied career spanning three decades under successive German, British and New Zealand owners before being scuttled in the North Atlantic in 1945.

DDG Hansa house flag

== Building ==
The ship was built by Flensburger Schiffbau-Gesellschaft of Flensburg, Schleswig-Holstein. She was launched on 13 November 1913 and completed on 1 January 1914. She had nine corrugated furnaces with a combined grate area of 148 square feet (14 m^{2}) that heated three 185 lb_{f}/in^{2} single-ended boilers with a combined heating surface of 6,956 square feet (646 m^{2}).

The ship was launched as D/S Schneefels for the Deutsche Dampfschiffahrts-Gesellschaft Hansa (DDG Hansa). D/S stands for Dampfschiff, just as "SS" stands for "Steamship" in English. DDG Hansa gave many of its ships names ending in -fels ("rock"), (e.g. D/S Freienfels, D/S Uhenfels, D/S Wachtfels), so that collectively they became known as the "Fels ships".

== First World War ==
On 5 August 1914, a week after the outbreak of the First World War, Schneefels was in the Mediterranean a mile off Europa Point when the Royal Navy captured her and took her to Gibraltar. She was judged to be a prize ship and was renamed Gibraltar. She was posted to Moudros in the Aegean Sea where she served as a store ship until 1915. From then until 1916 she served as a water carrier in the eastern Mediterranean.

In August 1916 the ship was returned to general cargo duties. She remained in UK Government ownership but was placed under the management of Houlder, Middleton and Company and renamed Polescar. In 1917 her management was transferred to G Heyn and Sons of Belfast. On 14 March 1917 she was northwest of Ireland when an enemy submarine on the surface chased her, but she outran it. On 25 September 1917 she was unloading at Dunkirk, France when she was caught in an air raid. A German bomb hit her and killed two people. On 5 August 1918 she was in the English Channel en route from Montreal to Le Havre. About 30 miles (48 km) southwest of St Catherine's Point she was damaged by a torpedo fired by the German submarine SM UC-71, but Polescar's crew managed to beach the ship to prevent her from sinking.

== Between the wars ==
The British-India Steam Navigation Company bought her in January 1919 but sold her the next month for £146,000 to the Union Steam Ship Company of New Zealand. The Union Line renamed her Wairuna, which had been the name of a cargo ship sunk by the German auxiliary cruiser SMS Wolf in 1917.

In 1921 the Union Company had her converted to carry oil cargo in her double bottoms. On 5 August 1925 en route from San Francisco to New Zealand Wairuna ran out of coal 550 miles (890 km) north of Auckland. She had radioed distress messages and was rescued by another Union Company ship, the Waihemo.

On 4 February 1933, a day after leaving Newcastle, New South Wales, Wairuna lost a blade from her propeller. She completed her voyage to Auckland on its remaining blades. On 2 March 1936 she collided with Glasgow Wharf at Napier, New Zealand. Wharf piles were damaged but the ship was unharmed. On 8 February 1937 she was in San Francisco when fire broke out in her cargo of copra. The ship was extensively damaged, with some buckling of her plates.

== Second World War and after ==
During the Second World War Wairuna continued in merchant service in the Pacific. In 1945 the Union Company sold her to the UK MoWT. The MoWT appointed J&J Denholm to manage her, and she served as a store ship on the River Clyde. On 5 August 1945 she was at Greenock when a fire destroyed much of her upperworks.

In October 1945 Wairuna's hulk was loaded with 8,432 tons of unused chemical ammunition and on 30 October she was scuttled in the North Atlantic beyond the continental shelf, 120 nautical miles (140 mi; 220 km) northwest of Ireland. Her wreck is at 55°30′N 11°00′W in 8,200 feet (2,500 m) of water.

Wairuna was one of four redundant cargo ships that the Admiralty used to dispose of chemical ammunition in the same area of the North Atlantic in 1945. The others were SS Empire Simba on 11 September, SS Empire Cormorant on 1 October, and SS Lambridge on 30 December.

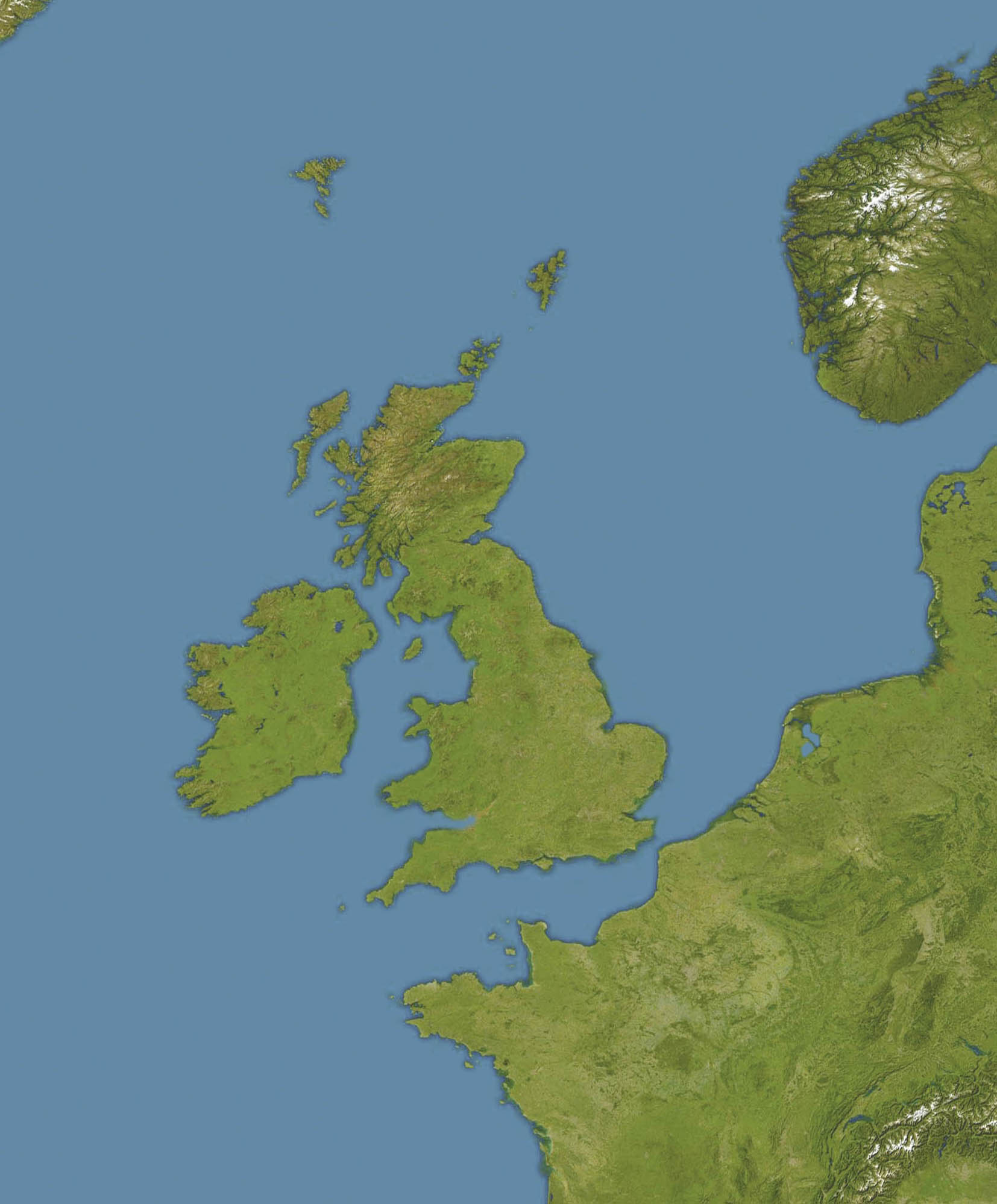
Approximate position of Wairuna's wreck

== Relic ==
The ship's bell has been preserved. It is cast brass and bears her original name Schneefels.
