= Operation Pacer =

Operation Pacer may refer to one of two different operations involving Agent Orange

- Operation Pacer HO, 1977 operation that incinerated the Agent Orange stored at Johnston Atoll
- Operation Pacer IVY, 1972 operation that removed Agent Orange from South Vietnam and stored it on Johnston Atoll
