= SS Fangturm =

A number of steamships have been named Fangturm, including :-

- SS Fangturm (1908), a Deutsche Hansa Linie cargo ship in service 1908-21
- SS Fangturm (1943), a Deutsche Hansa Linie cargo ship in service 1956-61
- SS Fangturm (1944), a Deutsche Hansa Linie cargo ship in service 1944-45
