= SS Kattenturm =

Two ships of the Deutsche Dampfschiffahrts-Gesellschaft Hansa were named Kattenturm:

- SS Kattenturm (1906), seized by Italy in 1916
- SS Kattenturm (1944), seized by the United Kingdom in 1944
