= Olsztyn (disambiguation) =

Olsztyn is a city in north-eastern Poland.

Olsztyn may also refer to:

- Olsztyn Voivodeship, a former administrative unit in Poland
- Olsztyn, Silesian Voivodeship, a town in southern Poland with ruins of a 14th-century castle
- SS Olsztyn, a Hansa A Type cargo ship in service 1947-72
