= SS Hadiotis =

A number of steamships were named Hadiotis, including –

- SS Hadiotis (1910), a Greek cargo ship in service 1925–29
- SS Hadiotis (1929), a Greek cargo ship in service 1929–41
- SS Hadiotis (1945), a Greek liberty ship in service 1947–65
