= SS Imkenturm =

A number of steamships have been named Imkenturm, including:-

- SS Imkenturm (1909), a cargo ship in service 1909-19
- SS Imkenturm (1944), a Hansa A Type cargo ship in service in 1945
- SS Inkenturm (1938), a cargo ship in service 1956-61
