= SS Euripides =

A number of ships have been named Euripides, including –

- SS Euripides (1883), wrecked in the Sea of Marmara
- SS Euripides (1914), An ocean liner built by Harland & Wolff for the Aberdeen Line
- SS Euripides (1944), a Panamanian cargo ship in service 1967–69
