= SS Adamsturm =

A number of steamships were named Adamsturm, including:

- SS Adamsturm (1909), a cargo ship in service 1909–1917
- SS Adamsturm (1944), a Hansa A Type cargo ship in service 1944–1945
