= SS Baltonia =

A number of steamships have been named Baltonia, including:-

- SS Baltonia (1902), a United Baltic Corporation cargo ship in service 1926-36
- SS Baltonia (1925), a United Baltic Corporation cargo ship in service 1936-43
- SS Baltonia (1944), a United Baltic Corporation cargo ship in service 1947-52
