= Good Logistics =

Freight forwarder and shipping company

- Company type: Private
- Industry: Logistics and supply chain
- Founded: 1833
- Founder: John Good
- Headquarters: Kingston upon Hull, United Kingdom
- Number of locations: Hull, Liverpool, Manchester, Felixstowe, London, Istanbul, Izmir, Shanghai, USA,
- Area served: Worldwide
- Products: Logistics
- Services: Haulage; Warehouse; Shipping agency; Customs clearance; Fourth-party logistics; Freight consolidation; Freight forwarder; Project forwarding; Third-party logistics
- Number of employees: 250+
- Website: goodlogisticsgroup.com

Good Logistics is a freight forwarder and shipping agency based in Kingston upon Hull, England. It offers a range of sea and air freight services, with strong port connections in Grimsby, Immingham, Hull, Felixstowe and overseas. Founded by John Good in 1833, the agency is a family-run business that is in its sixth generation.

As Ship Chandlers, Agents and Brokers, John Good used his connections he had gained through Finnish and Baltic ship owners to start-up John Good & Co, which later became known as John Good & Sons.

== Timeline ==
In 1883, John Good & Sons acquired its first regular liner agency, where passenger and cargo services were available between Finland and Hull.

In 1965, John Good & Sons opened an office in Ipswich.

In 2011, the Joint Managing Director Matthew Good died whilst taking part in a charity run. In his honour, the Matthew Good Foundation was founded to focus on research and education surrounding illness and deaths during endurance sporting events.

The company has featured in the Insider Growth Top 100 Awards 2014 with a 58.5% rise in turnover.

In 2020, John Good Logistics Limited became the new trading name for John Good Shipping, Connaught Air Services, Felixstowe Warehousing, FOCS Logistics, TEPS Felixstowe and Rewico. In the same year, the company opened its first US office in Saddle Brook, New Jersey. John Good Logistics, Inc. a wholly owned subsidiary of John Good Logistics Limited. John Good Logistics, Inc., a Delaware corporation doing business as a Foreign Corporation in the state of New Jersey.

In 2022, Good Logistics was acquired by Denholm Group. Prior to the acquisition, it had been part of the John Good Group, since it was founded in 1833.
