= MT Vulcanus =

Cargo ship

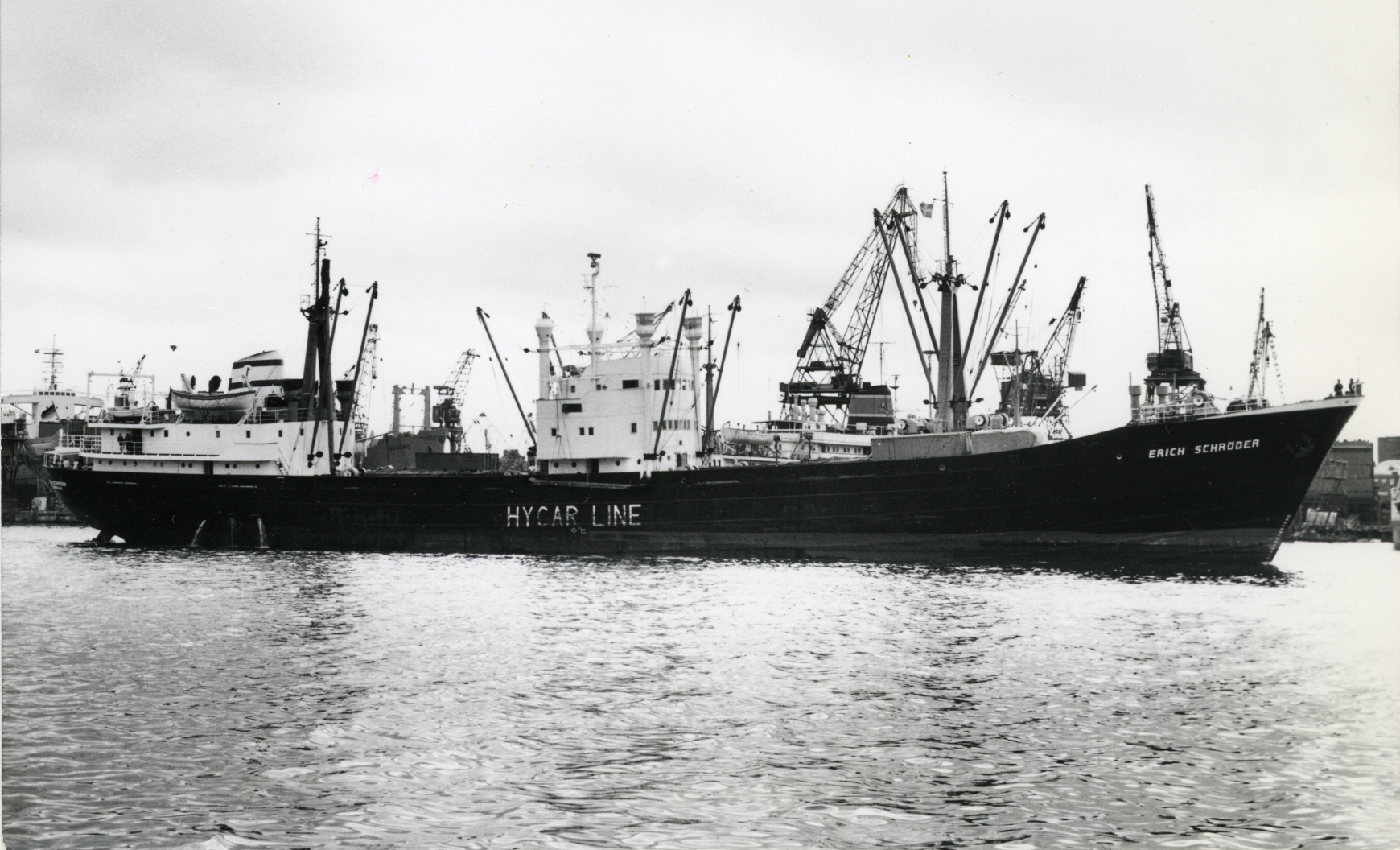
- Erich Schröder in 1969

History
- Name: Erich Schröder
- Owner: Reederei Richard Schröder, Hamburg, Germany
- Builder: Norderwerft Köser & Meyer, Hamburg, Germany
- Yard number: 818
- Launched: 10 November 1955
- Commissioned: 17 January 1956
- Identification: IMO number: 5105295; Call sign DGKU
- Fate: Sold February 1972

General characteristics
- Type: Cargo ship
- Tonnage: 2,144 GRT; 1,001 NRT; 3,820 tonnes deadweight (DWT)
- Displacement: 979 metric tons
- Length: 101.95 m (334 ft 6 in) Loa; 97.13 m (318 ft 8 in) LBP
- Beam: 14.45 m (47 ft 5 in)
- Height: 8.80 m (28 ft 10 in)
- Draft: 6.07 m (19 ft 11 in) max
- Propulsion: 2 8-cylinder 4-stroke diesel motors Type MAu 582 A; 2,800 PS (2,059 kW)
- Speed: 14 knots (26 km/h; 16 mph)
- Crew: 31
- Name: Vulcanus
- Owner: Ocean Combustion Service N. V., Rotterdam, Netherlands (division of DDG Hansa, Bremen, Germany)
- Operator: Vulcanus Shipping Pte. Ltd., Singapore
- Renamed: 1983 Vulcanus I
- Reclassified: 1972 Incinerator ship
- Refit: February 11–15 September 1972, K. A. van Brink N. V., Rotterdam; 1983 Jurong Shipyard, Singapore
- Identification: Call sign 9V2266; 1983 9VUR
- Fate: Sold 1990
- Notes: DDG Hansa bankrupt in 1980. Ship sold to Waste Management, Inc., Oak Brook, Illinois, United States

General characteristics
- Type: Incinerator ship
- Tonnage: 3,098 GT, 1,698 NT; 1983 2,972 GT, 1,419 NT; 1983 4,004 t DWT
- Displacement: 979 metric tons
- Length: 101.96 m (334 ft 6 in) Loa, 91.95 m (301 ft 8 in) LBP; 1983 97.08 m (318 ft 6 in) Loa, 92.16 m (302 ft 4 in) LBP
- Beam: 16.03 m (52 ft 7 in)
- Height: 7.40 m (24 ft 3 in)
- Draft: 6.06 m (19 ft 11 in) max
- Speed: 12 knots (22 km/h; 14 mph)
- Name: Oragreen
- Owner: Rederiet M.H. Simonsen A.p.S., Svendborg, Denmark
- Operator: Simonsen Tankers Ltd., Nassau, Bahamas
- Reclassified: 1990
- Refit: 1990
- Identification: Call sign C6IN5
- Fate: Sold 3 May 2004
- Name: Kotrando
- Owner: Kotram Nigeria Ltd., Apapa, Nigeria
- Identification: Call sign C6IN5
- Fate: Lost 2012

General characteristics
- Type: Bunkering tanker
- Tonnage: 3,033 GT; Summer 4,004 t DWT; Winter 3,846 t DWT
- Length: 97.08 m (318 ft 6 in) Loa
- Beam: 16.00 m (52 ft 6 in)
- Draft: 6.06 m (19 ft 11 in) max
- Speed: 14.5 knots (26.9 km/h)

MT Vulcanus, also known as Vulcanus I, Oragreen, Kotrando, and Erich Schröder, is a cargo ship first placed in service in 1956 that was used from 1972 to 1990 as an incinerator ship and later as a tanker.

== History ==
=== Launch and use as a freighter ===
In 1955 the Richard Schröder shipping company of Hamburg ordered construction of a dry cargo freighter from Norderwerft Köser & Meyer, also of Hamburg. Built as hull number 818, the ship was launched on 10 November 1955 as the Erich Schröder. After sea trials that began on 29 December 1955, the ship was delivered to the owners on 17 January 1956. It was built as a triple-superstructure ship with the machine room aft and the bridge amidships. It was equipped with three cargo hatches and loading equipment consisting of one 25-metric ton derrick and ten 5-metric ton derricks. In August 1962, the ship was transferred to the Richard Schröder K.G. shipping company, and in February 1972 sold to Ocean Combustion Service N. V. in Rotterdam.

=== Use as an incinerator ship ===
Beginning on 11 February 1972, the new owner had the ship converted into a waste incinerator ship at the K. A. van Brink shipyard in Rotterdam. Tanks for transportation of the waste were added, plus two incinerators located aft, in which the waste would be combusted at temperatures between 1,300 and 1,400 °C (2,370 and 2,550 °F). On 15 September 1972, the shipyard delivered the completed ship to Vulcanus Shipping Pte. Ltd. in Singapore, which placed it in service as the Vulcanus. Management of the ship remained with Ocean Combustion Service; it was operated by Hansa Steamship Company of Bremen (Ocean Combustion Service and Vulcanus Shipping both being subsidiaries of Hansa). It was capable of incinerating 400–500 metric tons of waste a day, or approximately 100,000 metric tons a year. The ship primarily operated in the North Sea out of Rotterdam; in 1980 it and other incinerator ships were burning an estimated 80,000 metric tons of wastes including TCDD in the North Sea; but was also used on other routes. For example, in 1974, Shell Oil contracted to have liquid chlorinated hydrocarbon wastes from its Shell Chemical subsidiary incinerated in the Gulf of Mexico, and in 1977 in the South Pacific, Vulcanus disposed of more than 8 million liters of Agent Orange left over from the Vietnam War, in the U.S. Air Force Operation Pacer HO.

Following Hansa's declaration of bankruptcy on 18 August 1980, the Vulcanus continued to operate until 1983, when it was overhauled at the Jurong shipyard in Singapore and equipped with a totally new forecastle equipping it to transport chemical waste. On 4 May 1983 the old forecastle was scrapped at Lien Ho Hsing Steel Enterprise Company in Kaohsiung, Taiwan. The rebuilt ship was again placed in service as an incinerator vessel, now under the name Vulcanus I. At the beginning of 1988, Waste Management, Inc., which had bought Vulcanus I and was then operating it and another incinerator ship named Vulcanus II, withdrew a longstanding application to provide offshore incineration of toxic wastes to the US market. Growing protests by environmental groups led to a decision by the Third International Conference on the Protection of the North Sea in 1990 to ban waste incineration in the North Sea from 31 December 1991. The decision was ratified on 23 June 1990 by the OSPAR Commission. Vulcanus I was then sold that year to the Danish shipping company M.H. Simonsen A.p.S. in Svendborg.

=== Later career ===
In 1990, Simonsen registered the ship with Simonsen Tankers Ltd. of Nassau, Bahamas, as the Oragreen, and had it converted into a bunkering tanker. It remained with Simonsen until 3 May 2004, when it was transferred, in Dakar, Senegal, to the Nigerian shipping company Kotram Nigeria Ltd. of Apapa. In 2009, the ship remained registered with Kotram as the Kotrando. She was lost in 2012.
