= SS Empire Simba =

British steam-powered cargo ship

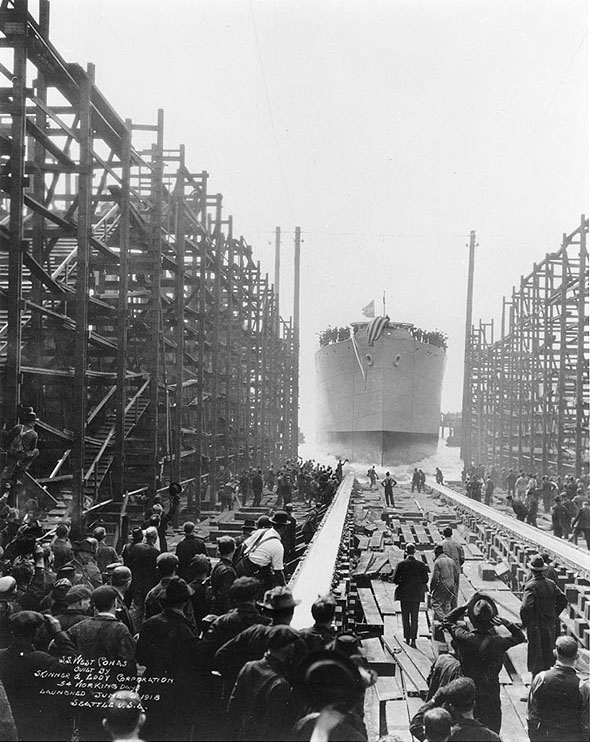
- West Cohas slides down the ways at her launching on 4 June 1918

History

United States
- Name: USS West Cohas (ID-3253)
- Builder: Skinner & Eddy; Seattle, Washington
- Yard number: 24
- Laid down: 2 April 1918
- Launched: 4 June 1918
- Completed: 29 June 1918
- Commissioned: 29 June 1918
- Decommissioned: 9 May 1919
- Fate: Returned to USSB

History
- Name: West Cohas
- Owner: 1919–33: United States Shipping Board; 1933–40: Lykes Brothers Steamship Company; 1940–45: Ministry of War Transport
- Route: 1926: Galveston – London
- Identification: 1919–40: US official number 216549; Signal code LMCP; ; 1940–45: UK official number 168015; Signal code GLNN
- Fate: Scuttled 11 September 1945

General characteristics
- Type: Cargo ship
- Tonnage: 5,647 GRT; tonnage under deck 5,173; 3,465 NRT
- Displacement: 12,225 t
- Length: 409.6 ft (124.8 m) (LPP); 423 ft 9 in (129.16 m) (overall)
- Beam: 54.2 ft (16.5 m)
- Draught: 24 ft 2 in (7.37 m) (mean) or 27.1 ft (8.3 m)
- Depth: 29 ft 9 in (9.07 m)
- Installed power: 2,700 bhp (2,000 kW)
- Propulsion: General Electric double reduction-geared steam turbine
- Speed: 10.5 knots (19.4 km/h) (1918)
- Capacity: 56 passengers (1919)
- Complement: 73
- Armament: 1 × 4-inch (100 mm) gun; 1 × 3-inch (76 mm) gun (1918)

SS Empire Simba was a British steam-powered cargo ship. She was originally an American ship, launched in 1918 as SS West Cohas. During a stint in the United States Navy from 1918 to 1919, she was called USS West Cohas (ID-3253).

West Cohas was built in 1918 for the United States Shipping Board (USSB) as part of the West boats, a series of steel-hulled cargo ships built on the West Coast of the United States for the World War I war effort. She was the 24th ship built by Skinner & Eddy of Seattle, Washington, and was completed in 88 calendar days. She was commissioned into the Naval Overseas Transportation Service (NOTS) of the United States Navy as USS West Cohas (ID-3253) in June 1918. After several overseas trips for the Navy, she was decommissioned in May 1919 and returned to the USSB.

West Cohas ran aground off Sable Island in 1925 while trying to assist a vessel in distress, but otherwise had a relatively uneventful merchant career for the USSB. In 1933, she was sold to the Lykes Brothers Steamship Company. In 1939, she collided with the Irish passenger ship Munster, which damaged both vessels. In June 1940, West Cohas was sold to British interests and renamed Empire Simba.

During convoy service in World War II, Empire Simba initially sailed between the United Kingdom and North America carrying cargos of scrap iron from the United States. She was bombed by a German aircraft on 1 March and abandoned. She was towed to port for repairs but was struck by a German land mine dropped in a bombing raid. After six months of repairs, she began sailing roundtrips to Freetown, Sierra Leone. On one return voyage to the UK in July 1944, she collided with another ship in the convoy. After splitting the rest of the war between voyages to North America and Africa, Empire Simba was loaded with chemical weapons in August 1945 and scuttled west of Ireland.

== Design and construction ==
The West ships were cargo ships of similar size and design built by several shipyards on the West Coast of the United States for the USSB for emergency use during World War I. All were given names that began with the word "West", like West Cohas, one of some 24 West ships built by Skinner & Eddy of Seattle, Washington. (Note: Skinner & Eddy was an emergency shipyard that operated only from 1916 until about 1920.)

West Cohas (Skinner & Eddy No. 24, USSB No. 1177) was launched on 4 May 1918 and delivered to the United States Navy upon completion later in the month. West Cohas was built in a total of 73 working days, 88 calendar days, and was listed in seventh place on a list of the ten fastest-built ocean-going vessels compiled in 1920. (Note: Hurley, however, reports West Cohas's construction time as 85 calendar days. Skinner & Eddy's number of 89 days would put West Cohas at number nine on the list.) Skinner & Eddy received a $64,000 bonus for completing the ship early.

The ship was 409.6 ft (124.8 m) long between perpendiculars and 423 ft 9 in (129.16 m) overall, and had a beam of 54.2 ft (16.5 m). Her draught was 24 feet 2 inches (7.37 m) (mean) or 27.1 ft (8.3 m) and her depth of hold was 29 ft 9 in (9.07 m). Her tonnages were 5,647 GRT, 5,173 tons under deck; 3,465 NRT 8,554 DWT 12,225 displacement.

The ship had a double reduction-geared steam turbine that drove her single screw propeller, giving her a speed of 10.5 knots (19.4 km/h). By 1930 her equipment included submarine signalling and radio.

== Military career ==
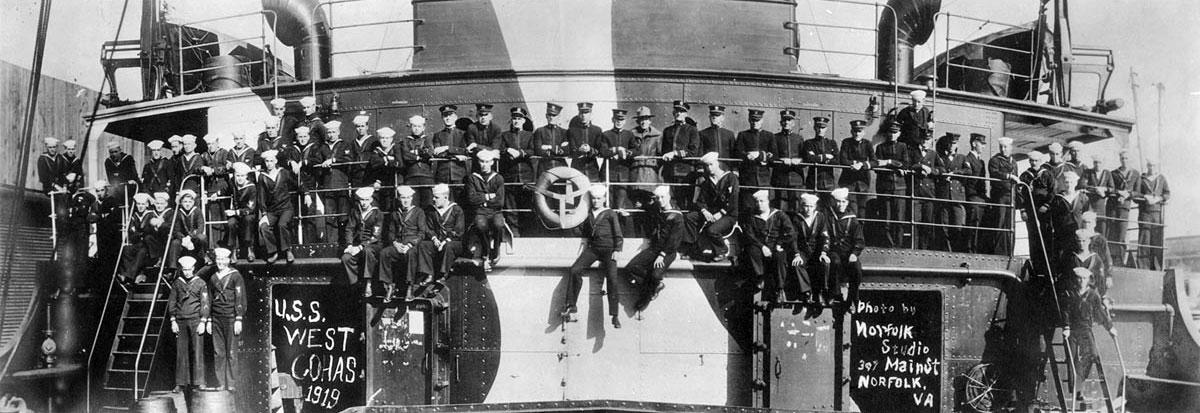
USS West Cohas's officers and men pose on her superstructure in 1919.

USS West Cohas (ID-3253) was commissioned into the NOTS on 4 June. After successfully completing sea trials, West Cohas sailed for Arica, Chile, to carry a cargo of nitrates to the United States. Sailing from Arica on 29 July, West Cohas transited the Panama Canal and arrived at Charleston, South Carolina, where she unloaded the cargo. She sailed up the East Coast to Norfolk, Virginia, where she arrived on 25 September. After taking on a full load of matériel for the American Expeditionary Force in France, she sailed on 9 October for Brest, France, where she arrived on 28 October. While in port discharging her cargo, the Armistice was signed on 11 November, ending the fighting. She sailed for the United States ten days later.

After her return, West Cohas made two post-war more voyages to La Pallice, France. She was employed as a transport during her return trips to the United States. Though specific information about the number of troops West Cohas carried (or was capable of carrying) is unknown, SS West Arrow, a Skinner & Eddy-constructed sister ship, carried 23 men on at least one voyage. She returned to Norfolk on 5 May at the conclusion of her second voyage where she was decommissioned 4 days later and returned to the USSB.

== Civilian career ==
After her return to the USSB, West Cohas sailed on a France – Southampton – New York route through 1920. In September 1919, West Grama carried 56 passengers from Bassens to New York.

Little is known about West Cohas's subsequent civilian career until 1925. On 20 July, The Washington Post carried a news report that West Cohas had run aground on shoals off Sable Island. The French fishing trawler Labrador had run aground on the shoals on the morning of 19 July and had issued a distress call. The nearby West Cohas steamed to her aid, but became stranded on the rocks nearby and issued her own distress call. Lifesaving crews had been dispatched but could reach neither ship because of fog and waves. At press time the Canadian government buoy tender and several tugs were reported on their way to aid both ships. There were no follow up reports to indicate how much damage West Cohas sustained, but she escaped the fate of the 399 GRT Labrador, which was a total loss. West Cohas had been repaired and was back in service by November 1926, when The Wall Street Journal reported that she was to begin service carrying grain from Galveston, Texas, to London.

In 1933, West Cohas was sold to the Lykes Brothers Steamship Company, which assigned her to its Ripley Steamship Company subsidiary. During the 1930s, Lykes Brothers primarily operated cargo ships between Gulf Coast and Caribbean ports, and, though there is little specific information available regarding West Cohas's movements, it is likely that she called at Gulf coast and Caribbean ports for portions of her Lykes Brothers career. In July 1938, she was sailing from New Orleans to Liverpool when she rammed the Irish motor vessel Munster 15 nautical miles (28 km) north of Dublin. Munster, with 200 passengers aboard, was damaged on her starboard side, while West Cohas's bow was twisted from the impact. Both vessels made it to Liverpool without loss of life.

== World War II ==
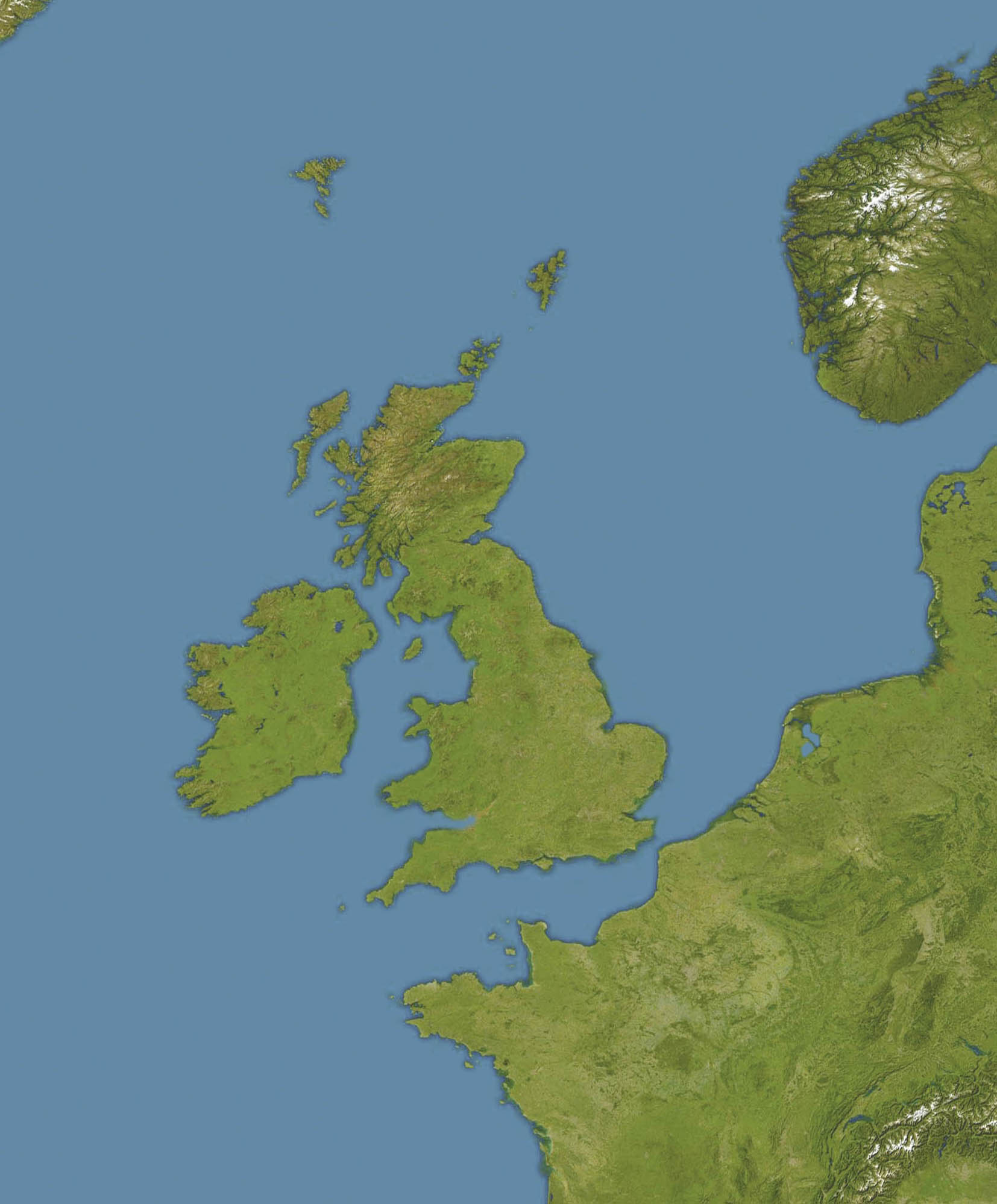
Approximate position of Empire Simba's wreck

On 21 June 1940, Lykes Brothers sold West Cohas to British interests for transfer to British registry. The crew for the newly British ship was shipped from Liverpool on the Cunard Line ocean liner Scythia to New York via Halifax and bussed to Galveston, Texas, to take possession of the ship. Sailing from that port, they took on a load of scrap iron and headed for Bermuda. At Bermuda, West Cohas joined a convoy to Halifax and then on to Liverpool. At about 1030 hrs on 19 August West Cohas lost track of the convoy but continued on independently, arriving at Liverpool on 23 August. West Cohas sailed for Methil five days later and arrived on 1 September.

The ship was transferred to the Ministry of War Transport, which renamed her Empire Simba and assigned Andrew Weir & Co. of London to manage her. After spending six weeks at Methil, where she had an advanced ship degaussing system installed among other repairs, Empire Simba proceeded to Oban via Lyness in mid November. She set out for North America in Convoy OB 253 on 2 December. Four days out, heavy weather dispersed the convoy, and Empire Simba proceeded independently. The ship continued to take a beating from heavy seas which opened the number one cargo hold to the ocean. Because the water was coming in faster than the bilge pumps in the hold number one could pump, the crew cut through the bulkheads into cargo hold number two to double the pumping capacity and were able to keep the ship under control long enough to arrive in Bermuda on 26 December. After temporary repairs were made there, Empire Simba sailed on 6 January 1942 first to Halifax and then to Baltimore for more permanent repairs.

After two weeks in Baltimore, Empire Simba headed to Hampton Roads, Virginia, to take on another load of scrap iron for the UK. After making her way to Halifax by early February, she sailed on 9 February as a part of Convoy HX 108, but dropped out and joined up with Convoy SC 22, a slower convoy that had left Halifax a day earlier. Off the Northern Ireland coast, the convoy escorts broke off and Empire Simba and three other ships sailed into the Irish Sea. Headed to her destination of Port Talbot, Empire Simba was at the back of the line of the four ships. At 1300 hrs on 1 March, a Heinkel He 111 bomber of Kampfgeschwader 27, Luftwaffe attacked the column, and had a near miss on Empire Simba. The force of the explosion shattered the main water injection pipe in the engine room, flooding her engine room and leaving the ship dead in the water. The German bomber, with smoke trailing from it after being hit by bullets from one of Empire Simba's two Hotchkiss Mark I machine guns, headed off for Ireland. There were no towing vessels immediately available for Empire Simba, so as darkness approached, Empire Simba's crew abandoned the ship for the escorting trawler. Taking the ship's two machine guns, the chronometer, and some personal belongings, the crew were landed at Milford Haven. Empire Simba was saved and towed into Birkenhead, where the officers rejoined with their erstwhile ship. During an overnight bombing raid on the night of 12/13 March, German bombers parachuted land mines on Birkenhead. One landed on Empire Simba and exploded, causing significant damage to the ship.

By mid-August 1941, Empire Simba, with a completely new crew, had been repaired enough to set out in a Liverpool – Freetown convoy, but evidently returned to Liverpool the same day. After making her way to Oban on 9 September, she began the first of seven roundtrips to Freetown over the next 18 months, including convoy SL 125. Twice, when setting out with convoys, Empire Simba had to return to port with unspecified problems. In a third convoy sailing, a problem with her steering gear caused her to collide with another convoy ship, Empire Scott, and on 1 August Empire Simba straggled and dropped out of the convoy.

In February and March 1944, Empire Simba made an extended round trip from the United Kingdom to Gibraltar. During this time, she called in neutral Spain at Valencia on 15 March and Burriana on 18 March. Between April 1944 and June 1945 she made four transatlantic crossings, interrupted by another trip to Freetown in December 1944.

=== Scuttling ===
By August 1945, Empire Simba was at anchor in the harbour of Cairn Ryan in the west of Scotland. There she was loaded with 8,000 tons of chemical weapons that had been stockpiled for use if the Germans had used chemical weapons first. On 11 September Empire Simba was scuttled in the North Atlantic beyond the continental shelf, 120 nautical miles (140 mi; 220 km) northwest of Ireland. Her wreck is at 55°30′N 11°00′W in 8,200 feet (2,500 m) of water.

Empire Simba was one of four redundant cargo ships that the Admiralty used to dispose of chemical ammunition at the same site in the North Atlantic in 1945. The others were SS Empire Cormorant on 1 October, SS Wairuna on 30 October, and SS Lambridge on 30 December.

== Bibliography ==
- Crowell, Benedict; Wilson, Robert Forrest (1921). The Road to France: The Transportation of Troops and Military Supplies, 1917–1918. How America Went to War: An Account From Official Sources of the Nation's War Activities, 1917–1920. New Haven: Yale University Press. OCLC 18696066.
- Hurley, Edward Nash (1920). The New Merchant Marine. New York: Century. OCLC 751444.
- Hutson, Harry C. (2006) [1997]. Arctic Interlude (Third Merriam ed.). Bennington, Vermont: Merriam Press. ISBN 978-1-57638-059-8.
- Naval Historical Center. "West Cohas". Dictionary of American Naval Fighting Ships. Navy Department, Naval History & Heritage Command.
- United States House of Representatives, Select Committee on U. S. Shipping Board Operations (1920). Shipping Board Operations. Washington, D.C.: Government Printing Office. OCLC 64558341.
