= SS Freienfels =

Two steamships of DDG Hansa were named Freienfels.

- SS Freienfels (1910), seized in 1914 by the United Kingdom
- SS Freienfels (1929), struck a mine off Livorno, Italy in 1941 and sank
