= SS Lambridge =

Cargo ship

History

United Kingdom
- Name: Glennevis
- Namesake: Glen Nevis, Scotland
- Owner: Western Steam Ship Co, Glasgow
- Operator: James Gardiner & Co
- Port of registry: (United Kingdom) Glasgow
- Builder: Ayrshire Dockyard Company Ltd, Irvine
- Yard number: 445
- Launched: 2 March 1917
- Completed: May 1917
- Out of service: 1922
- Fate: Sold
- Name: African Prince
- Owner: Rio Cape Line, Ltd.
- Operator: Furness Withy
- Port of registry: (United Kingdom) Newcastle upon Tyne
- Acquired: 1922
- Out of service: 1936
- Identification: code letters JPRN (until 1933); UK official number 137842
- Fate: Sold
- Name: Pentridge Hill
- Namesake: Pentridge Hill, Dorset
- Owner: Dorset Steam Ship Company
- Operator: Counties Ship Management
- Port of registry: (United Kingdom) London
- Acquired: 1936
- Out of service: 1939
- Identification: Call sign GQTZ (from 1934); UK Official Number 137842
- Fate: Sold
- Name: Botlea
- Owner: Ministry of War Transport (1939)
- Operator: Sir Wm. Reardon Smith & Sons (1939–43 or 44?); Weidner, Hopkins & Co (?–1945)
- Port of registry: (United Kingdom) London
- Acquired: 1939
- Out of service: 1939
- Identification: Call sign GQTZ (from 1934); UK Official Number 137842
- Name: HMS Lambridge (X15)
- Owner: Admiralty
- Operator: Royal Navy
- Acquired: 1939
- In service: 1939
- Out of service: 1941
- Name: Lambridge
- Owner: Admiralty
- Port of registry: (United Kingdom)
- In service: 1941
- Out of service: 1945
- Fate: Scuttled

General characteristics
- Type: Cargo ship
- Tonnage: 5,119 GRT; tonnage under deck 4,800; 3,245 NRT
- Length: 400.7 feet (122.1 m) p/p
- Beam: 53.4 feet (16.3 m)
- Draught: 24 feet 1 inch (7.34 m)
- Depth: 27.4 feet (8.4 m)
- Installed power: 510 NHP
- Propulsion: 3-cylinder triple expansion steam engine; single screw
- Speed: 10.5 knots (19.4 km/h)

SS Lambridge was a 5,119 GRT UK cargo ship that was built in 1917, gave 28 years of service and was scuttled in 1945. She was launched as Glennevis but changed owners and names a number of times, successively becoming African Prince, Pentridge Hill, Botlea, HMS Lambridge and Lambridge. She was scuttled as part of a programme to dispose of UK stocks of chemical weapons.

== Building ==
The Ayrshire Dockyard Company Ltd. built the ship to the UK Shipping Controller's standard "B" type cargo ship design. She had nine corrugated furnaces with a combined grate area of 119 square feet (11 m^{2}) heating three 180 lb_{f}/in^{2} single-ended boilers with a combined heating surface of 7,647 square feet (710 m^{2}). The boilers fed a Dunsmuir and Jackson three-cylinder 510 NHP triple expansion steam engine that drove a single screw propeller.

== Names and owners ==
The ship was launched in 1917 as Glennevis for the Western Steam Ship Company of Glasgow. In 1922 she was sold to Furness Withy who renamed her African Prince. In 1936 she was sold to the Dorset Steamship Company, which renamed her Pentridge Hill. Dorset SS Co was a London-based company controlled by Counties Ship Management.

In 1939 she was sold to Sir Wm. Reardon Smith & Sons, Ltd, who renamed her Botlea. In September and October 1939 she became one of nine merchant ships that the Admiralty acquired to convert into Q-ships. Botlea was commissioned into the Royal Navy as HMS Lambridge with the pennant number X15. The Q-ships were not successful and from February 1941 she served as the armed merchant cruiser Lambridge.

== Scuttling ==
After the Second World War the Admiralty used her to dispose of redundant chemical ammunition. On 30 December 1945 she was scuttled in the North Atlantic beyond the continental shelf, 120 miles (190 km) northwest of Ireland. Her wreck is at 55°30′N 11°00′W in 8,200 feet (2,500 m) of water.

Lambridge was one of four redundant cargo ships that the Admiralty used to dispose of chemical ammunition at the same site in the North Atlantic. The others were Empire Simba on 11 September, Empire Cormorant on 1 October and Wairuna on 30 October.

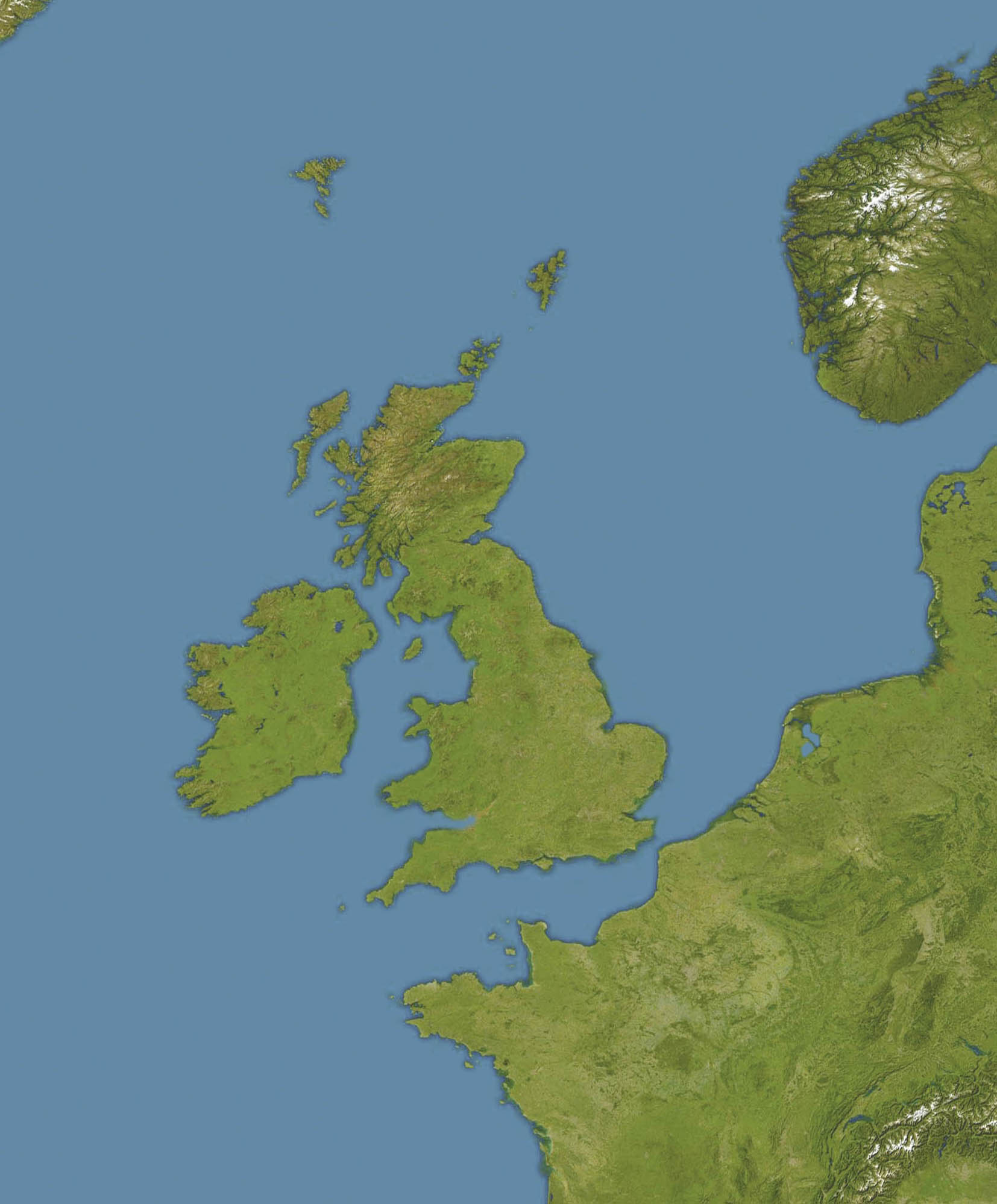
Approximate position of Lambridge's wreck
