= SS Western Maid =

American-built cargo ship

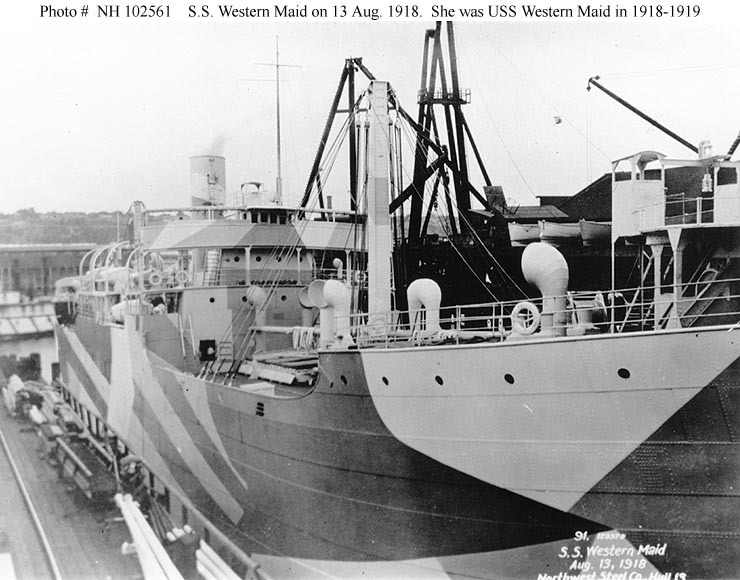
- Western Maid, 13 August 1918

History
- Name: Western Maid (1918); USS Western Maid (1918-19); Western Maid (1919-41); Empire Cormorant (1941-45)
- Owner: United States Shipping Board (1918); United States Navy (1918-19); United States Shipping Board (1919-37); United States Maritime Commission (1937-40); Ministry of Shipping (1940-41); Ministry of War Transport (1941-45)
- Operator: United States Shipping Board (1918); Naval Overseas Transportation Service (1918-19); United States War Department (1919); United States Shipping Board (1919-37); United States Maritime Commission (1937-40); R Chapman & Son (1940-45)
- Port of registry: Portland, United States (1918-40); (United Kingdom) London (1940-45)
- Builder: Northwest Steel Co
- Yard number: 13
- Launched: 8 July 1918
- Completed: August 1918
- Commissioned: 17 August 1918
- Decommissioned: 20 March 1919
- Maiden voyage: 21 August 1918
- In service: 21 August 1918
- Out of service: 1 October 1945
- Identification: US Official Number 120372 (1918); Pennant Number ID-3703 (1918–19); US Official Number 120372 (1919–); US Official Number 216754 (1930–40); UK Official Number 168086 (1940-45); Code Letters LMKT (1930–40); Code Letters GNFF (1940-45)
- Fate: Scuttled

General characteristics
- Type: Cargo ship
- Tonnage: 5,760 GRT; tonnage under deck 5,139; 3,503 NRT; 12,185 DWT
- Length: 409.8 feet (124.9 m) between perpendiculars; 423 ft 9 in (129.16 m) overall
- Beam: 54.2 ft (16.5 m)
- Draught: 24 feet 0½ inch (7.33 m)
- Depth: 27.2 ft (8.3 m) or 29 ft 9 in (9.07 m)
- Installed power: 594 NHP
- Propulsion: DeLaval double reduction-geared steam turbine; single screw
- Speed: 15 knots (28 km/h)
- Complement: 70

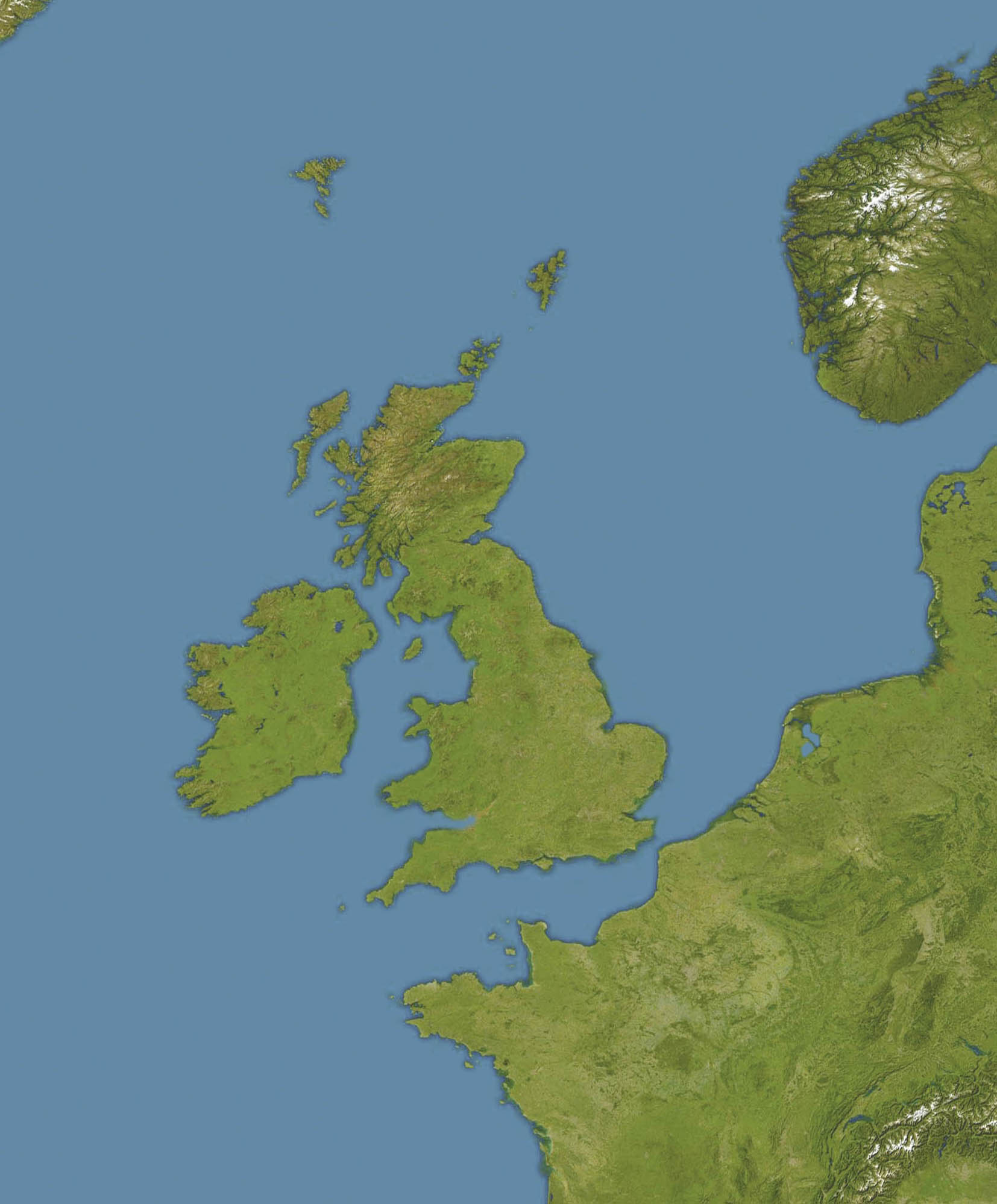
Position of the scuttling of Empire Cormorant.

Western Maid was a 5,760 GRT cargo ship that was built in 1918 by the Northwest Steel Company, Portland, Oregon, USA. She was built for the United States Shipping Board (USSB), but was commissioned into the United States Navy on completion as USS Western Maid, with the pennant number ID-3703. In 1919 she was decommissioned and returned to the USSB. In 1937 she was passed to the United States Maritime Commission. In 1940 she was transferred to the British Ministry of Shipping and renamed Empire Cormorant, passing to the Ministry of War Transport (MoWT) in 1941. In 1945 she was scuttled in the North Atlantic with a cargo of obsolete war matériel.

== Description ==
The ship was built in 1918 by Northwest Steel Co, Portland, Oregon. Yard number 13, she was launched in August 1918, and completed that month.

She had a depth of 27.2 ft (8.3 m) or 29 ft 9 in (9.07 m) and a draught of 24 feet 1/2 inch (7.33 m). Her tonnages were 5,760 GRT, 5,139 tons under deck; 3,503 NRT 12,185 DWT.

Her engine was a steam turbine made by the De Laval Steam Turbine Co of Trenton, New Jersey. It was rated at 594 NHP and drove her single screw propeller via double reduction gearing. This made her a comparatively fast freighter for her day, capable of up to 15 knots (28 km/h).

== History ==
Originally laid down as Aisne for the Compagnie Générale Transatlantique, she was taken over by the USSB and launched as Western Maid. On completion, the ship was passed to the United States Navy and commissioned on 17 August 1918 as USS Western Maid, with the pennant number ID-3703. She was operated by the Naval Overseas Transportation Service. The Official Number 120372 was allocated.

Western Maid started her maiden voyage on 21 August 1918, transporting a cargo of flour from Portland to Arica, Chile, and a cargo of nitrates from Arica to New Orleans, Louisiana via the Panama Canal, arriving on 23 October. Western Maid departed New Orleans on 11 November, taking 6,082 tons of general cargo to New York, where she arrived on 17 November. On 10 January 1919 Western Maid was allocated to the War Department for use as a transport. That day, Western Maid was involved in a collision in New York Harbor. The owners of the other vessel attempted to sue the USSB for damages, but the case was dismissed as it was held that Western Maid was "engaged in public service". She departed New York with a cargo of grain for Falmouth, Cornwall, United Kingdom for delivery to the Food Administration Grain Corporation or resale to Allied governments. Engine trouble forced a return to New York, and she resumed the voyage on 14 January. Western Maid called at Falmouth and Plymouth and then sailed to Rotterdam, Netherlands before returning to the United States, arriving at Baltimore, Maryland on 12 March 1919.

Western Maid was decommissioned on 20 March 1919 and returned to the USSB. By 1930 she had been allocated the United States Official Number 216754 and the Code Letters LKMT. In 1937, she was transferred to the United States Maritime Commission. In 1940, Western Maid was transferred to the British Ministry of Shipping and renamed Empire Cormorant. She was placed under the management of R Chapman & Son, Newcastle upon Tyne. Her port of registry was London and she bore the UK Official Number 168086 and Code Letters GNFF. In 1941 Empire Cormorant was transferred to the MoWT, remaining under the management of Chapman.

Empire Cormorant was a member of Convoy HS 36, which departed Halifax, Nova Scotia on 29 July 1942 and arrived at Sydney on 31 July. Empire Cormorant then joined Convoy SC 97, which departed Halifax on 22 August and arrived at Liverpool, United Kingdom on 7 September. She was carrying general cargo bound for Cardiff, Wales. On 29 September 1943, Spitfire Vb aircraft BM177 was loaded on board Empire Cormorant. It was delivered to Portugal on 19 October. Empire Cormorant was a member of Convoy MKS 31, which departed Gibraltar on 23 November and arrived at Liverpool on 7 December. She was on a voyage from Casablanca, Morocco to the River Mersey with a cargo of phosphates. On 3 January 1944, cargo loaded on board Empire Cormorant included Spitfire Vb aircraft W3648 and BM176. They were delivered to Portugal on 17 February.

=== Scuttling ===
In 1945 Empire Cormorant was loaded with a cargo of obsolete chemical ammunition and on 1 October she was scuttled in the North Atlantic beyond the continental shelf, 120 nautical miles (138 miles; 222 km) northwest of Ireland. Her wreck is at 55°30′N 11°00′W in 8,200 feet (2,500 m) of water.

Empire Cormorant was one of four redundant cargo ships that the Admiralty used to dispose of chemical ammunition in the same area of the North Atlantic in 1945. The others were SS Empire Simba on 11 September, SS Wairuna on 30 October, and SS Lambridge on 30 December.
