= SS Lichtenfels =

Coordinates: 15.6108°N 39.4744°E

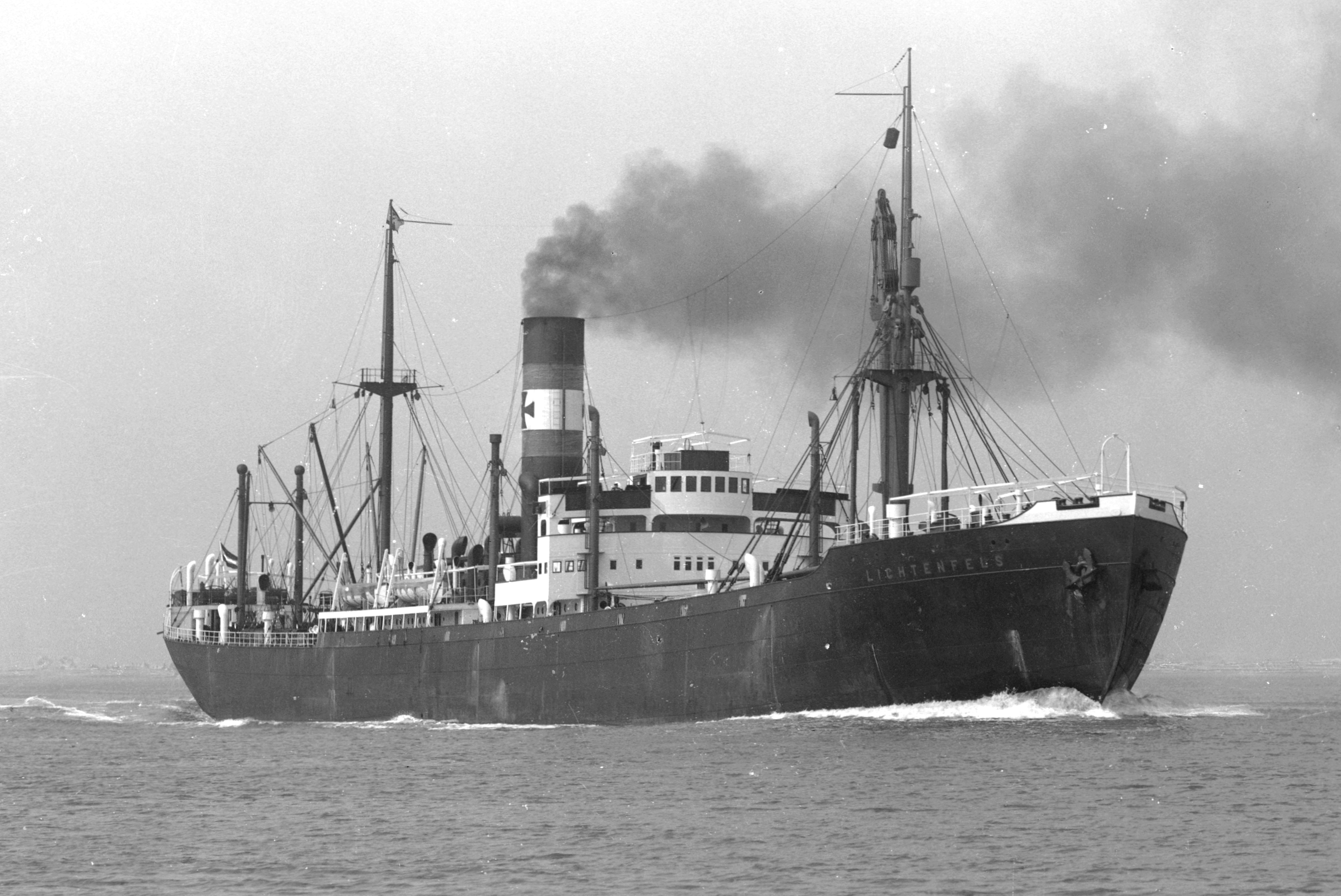
- Lichtenfels on the river Scheldt

History
- Name: Lichtenfels
- Owner: DDG Hansa
- Operator: DDG Hansa
- Port of registry: Bremen
- Builder: Deschimag, Bremen
- Yard number: 878
- Launched: 12 June 1929
- In service: 1929–41
- Identification: Code letters QMKB (1929–33); Call sign DOFY (1934–41)
- Fate: Scuttled 4 April 1941; Wreck raised and scrapped 1950

General characteristics
- Type: heavy-lift ship
- Tonnage: 7,457 GRT, 4,521 NRT
- Length: 160.45 m (526.4 ft)
- Beam: 18.94 m (62.1 ft)
- Draught: 8.49 m (27.9 ft)
- Installed power: 785 NHP
- Propulsion: 3-cylinder triple-expansion engine; plus exhaust steam turbine
- Speed: 13.7 knots (25.4 km/h)
- Capacity: 12 passengers
- Crew: 64
- Notes: sister ships: Freienfels, Geierfels, Uhenfels

SS Lichtenfels was an early example of a modern heavy-lift ship. She was launched in 1929 in Germany for DDG Hansa. She was equipped with a 120 t (118 long tons; 132 short tons) boom crane capable of lifting fully assembled railway locomotives, which were shipped to India.

In 1941 Lichtenfels was scuttled in the Red Sea as a blockship. In 1950 her wreck was raised and scrapped.

== Building ==
After the First World War a Norwegian company, Skibs A/S Christen Smiths Rederi, developed heavy-lift ships to carry locomotives from Great Britain to Belgium. The company began by having existing ships adapted, but in 1924 Armstrong Whitworth completed the first purpose-built heavy-lift ship for Christen Smith. By the end of 1926 Christen Smith had a fleet of several heavy-lift ships.

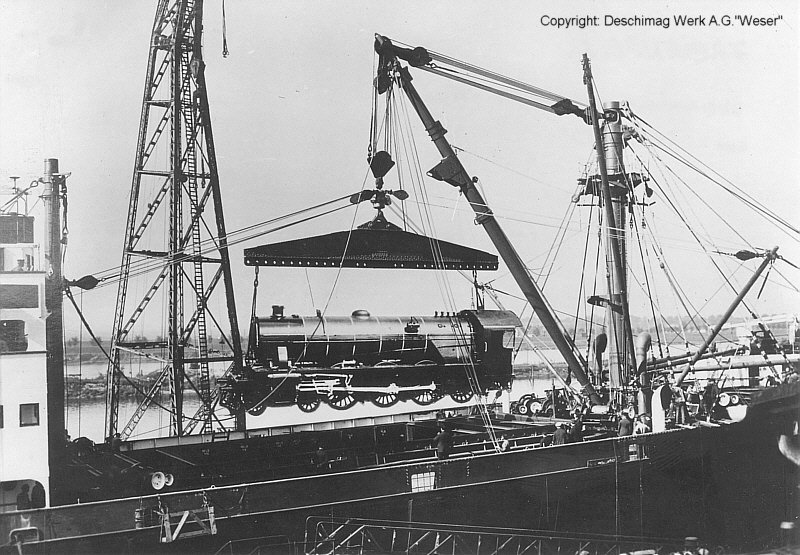
Lichtenfels' boom crane lifting a locomotive

With Lichtenfels DDG Hansa began to compete in the heavy-lift market to take fully-assembled locomotives to India. Deschimag built Lichtenfels at its "Weser" yard in Bremen.

Lichtenfels was built with a Maierform bow with a convex profile, which was meant to improve both her speed and her handling. She had a three-cylinder triple-expansion engine plus a Bauer-Wach low-pressure exhaust steam turbine. Exhaust steam from the low-pressure cylinder of the triple-expansion engine powered the turbine. The turbine drove the same shaft as the piston engine by double-reduction gearing and a Föttinger fluid coupling. The combined power of her piston engine and turbine was 785 NHP.

As demand for locomotives from India continued, DDG Hansa ordered three sister ships from Deschimag: Freienfels launched in 1929, Geierfels launched in 1930 and Uhenfels launched in 1931.

== Identification ==
Lichtenfels' code letters were QMKB until 1933. In 1934 they were superseded by the call sign DOFY.

== Scuttling ==
On 25 October 1939, while off the Port Sudan Lichtenfels was ordered to Massawa in Italian Eritrea. During the East African campaign she stayed here for 18 months with nine other German merchant ships: Bertram Rickmers, Coburg, Crefeld, Frauenfels, Gera, Liebenfels, Oder, Oliva and Wartenfels.

On 4 April 1941 Lichtenfels and other German and Italian merchant ships were scuttled in an attempt to blockade the harbour. Her wreck was raised and scrapped in 1950.
