= SS Aghia Thalassini =

History
- Name: Brünhilde (1943-45); Empire Game (1945-47); Canford (1947-56); Fangturm (1956-61); Panaghia Lourion (1961-67); Aghia Thalassini (1967-73)
- Owner: Hamburg-Südamerikanische Dampfschifffahrts-Gesellschaft, (1944-45); Ministry of War Transport (1945-46); Ministry of Transport (1946-47); Mundus Export & Shipping Co. Ltd (1947-56); Partenreederei D. "Fangturm" (1956-59); Deutsche Dampfschifffarts-Gesellschaft Hansa (1959-61); Rio Pardo (1961-67); Tamara Compagnia Naviera (1967-70); Aldebaran Shipping Co (1970-73)
- Operator: Hamburg-Südamerikanische Dampfschifffahrts-Gesellschaft, (1944-45); Mundus Export & Shipping Co. Ltd (1945-56); Partenreederei D. "Fangturm" (1956-59); Deutsche Dampfschifffarts-Gesellschaft Hansa (1959-61); Rio Pardo (1961-67); Tamara Compagnia Naviera (1967-70); Aldebaran Shipping Co (1970-73)
- Port of registry: (Nazi Germany) Hamburg, Germany (1944-45); London, United Kingdom (1945-56); Bremen, West Germany (1956-61); Beirut, Lebanon (1961-67); Piraeus, Greece (1967-70); Famagusta, Cyprus (1970-73)
- Builder: C. Van der Giessen & Zonen's Scheepswerfen NV
- Yard number: 726
- Laid down: 17 April 1943
- Launched: 20 October 1943
- Completed: 31 May 1944
- Out of service: 1973
- Identification: Code Letters DKKS (1943-45); Code Letters GTJN (1945-56); Code Letters DLCG (1956-61); Code Letters ODHH (1961-67); Code Letters SXMI (1957-70); Code Letters 5BMX (1970-73); IMO number: 5269522 ( –1974)
- Fate: Scrapped 1974

General characteristics
- Class & type: Hansa A type Cargo ship
- Tonnage: 1,925 GRT, 935 NRT, 3,120 DWT (1944-56); 2,742 GRT, 1,511 NRT, 3,582 DWT (1956-74)
- Length: 85.30 m (279 ft 10 in)
- Beam: 13.60 m (44 ft 7 in)
- Draught: 6.08 m (19 ft 11 in)
- Depth: 4.84 m (15 ft 11 in)
- Installed power: Compound steam engine, 1,200IHP
- Propulsion: Single screw propeller
- Speed: 10.5 knots (19.4 km/h)
- Crew: 37

Aghia Thallassini was a Hansa A Type cargo ship which was built as Brünhilde in 1943 by C. Van der Giessen & Zonen's Scheepswerfen NV, Krimpen aan den IJssel, Netherlands for Hamburg-Südamerikanische Dampfschifffahrts-Gesellschaft, Hamburg, Germany. She was seized as a prize of war in 1945, passing to the Ministry of War Transport and renamed Empire Game. She was sold in 1947 and was renamed Canford. Sold to West Germany in 1956, she was rebuilt and renamed Fangturm. She was sold to the Lebanon in 1961 and was renamed Panaghia Lourion. She was sold in 1967 to Greece and was renamed Aghia Thassalini. Sold to Cyprus in 1970, she served until 1973, when she was scrapped.

== Description ==
The ship was 85.30 m (279 ft 10 in) long, with a beam of 13.60 m (44 ft 7 in). She had a depth of 4.84 m (15 ft 11 in), and a draught of 6.08 m (19 ft 11 in). She was assessed as 1,925 GRT, 965 NRT, 3,120 DWT.

The ship was propelled by a compound steam engine. The engine was built by werkspoor, Amsterdam, Netherlands. Rated at 1,200IHP, it drove a single screw propeller and could propel the ship at 10.5 knots (19.4 km/h).

The ship had a complement of 37. She was equipped with 1×30-tonne, 1×10-tonne and 10×5-tonne cranes.

== History ==
Brünhilde was a Hansa A Type cargo ship built in 1943 as yard number 726 by C. Van der Giessen & Zonen's Scheepswerfen NV, Krimpen aan den IJssel, Netherlands for Hamburg-Südamerikanische Dampfschifffahrts-Gesellschaft, Hamburg, Germany. Her keel was laid on 17 April, She was launched on 20 October and completed on 31 May 1944. Her port of registry was Hamburg, and the Code Letters DKKS were allocated.

On 18 March 1945, Brünhilde was severely damaged by the explosion of two mines off Warnemünde. In May 1945, Brünhilde was seized as a prize of war at Kiel, Germany. She was passed to the Ministry of War Transport and was renamed Empire Game. The Code Letters GTJN were allocated. Her port of registry was London and she was operated under the management of Mundus Export & Shipping Co. Ltd. In December 1946, the Ministry of Transport offered Empire Game for sale.

On 5 March 1947, Empire Game was sold to Mundus Export & Shipping Co. Ltd. and was renamed Canford.

On 16 March 1956, Canford was sold to Partenreederei D. "Fangturm"Bremen, West Germany, which was 95% owned by Bohlen & Behn, Hamburg and 5% owned by the Deutsche Dampfschifffarts-Gesellschaft Hansa, Hamburg. She was rebuilt and renamed Fangturm. She was assessed at 2,742 GRT, 1,511 NRT, 3,582 DWT. Her port of registry was Bremen and the Code Letters DLCG were allocated. In May 1959, she was sold to Deutsche Dampfschifffarts-Gesellschaft Hansa.

on 23 November 1961, Fangturm was sold to Rio Pardo Naviera SA, Beirut, Lebanon and was renamed Panaghia Lourion. The Code Letterf ODHH were allocated. With their introduction in the 1960s, Panaghia Lourion was allocated the IMO Number 5269522.

In 1967, Panaghia Lourion was sold to Tamara Compagnia Naviera, Piraeus, Greece and was renamed Aghia Thalassini. The Code Letters SXMI were allocated. She was sold in 1970 to Aldebaran Shipping Co., Famagusta, Cyprus. The Code Letters 5BMX were allocated. She arrived at Perama, Greece on 15 June 1973 for scrapping by I. Katimertzoglou. Aghia Thalassini was scrapped in May 1974.
