= Operation Pacer IVY =

1972 U.S. Air Force operation

Operation Pacer IVY was a 1972 operation of the U.S. Air Force that removed Agent Orange from South Vietnam and stored it on Johnston Atoll. IVY was presumably selected as an abbreviation of InVentorY. Operation Pacer HO refers to an associated program of the United States Department of Defense (DoD), dealing with the disposition of Agent Orange from Vietnam.

== Purpose ==
On 15 April 1970, the Assistant Secretary of Defense suspended the use of Herbicide Orange (HO), a defoliant spray mixture during the Vietnam War. The suspension lasted from April 15, 1970, to September 13, 1971. On September 13, 1971, the Secretary directed the Chairman of the Joint Chiefs of Staff that “all stocks of Herbicide Orange in Vietnam will be returned to the Continental United States as quickly as practicable for disposition. A joint State Department and Defense Department message has been prepared requesting the U.S. Embassy negotiate with the Government of Republic of Vietnam for the return to U.S. control of all stocks of Herbicide Orange in Vietnam.” Based on this directive, the 7th Air Force in Vietnam initiated Operation PACER IVY, the removal of all Herbicide Orange in Vietnam to Johnston Island.

== Public opposition ==
Another problem arose with the movement and storage of Herbicide Orange from Vietnam. In 1971, Congress passed The Foreign Military Sales Act Amendment (Public Law 91-672) to prohibit the transportation of chemical weapons from the Island of Okinawa to Umatilla Chemical Depot during Operation Red Hat. In addition, the law prohibited the transfer of nerve agent, mustard agent, Agent Orange and other chemical munitions located in other countries into all 50 U.S. states.

Public Law 91-672 further directed the U.S. Department of Defense to destroy these chemical weapons outside the United States. As a result of Congressional and citizen interest in disposal problems, the DoD decided to move the 1.37 million gallons (25,266 55-gallon drums) to Johnston Atoll for storage to await a means of future sales, salvage, or disposal.

== Operation ==
The cargo ship, the M/T TransPacific, arrived at Da Nang on March 10, 1972, departing on March 15 to Cam Ranh Bay to load drums from Tuy Hoa Air Base where it then sailed to Saigon to load stocks of herbicides collected there. On April 18, 1972, the M/T TransPacific, arrived at Johnston Island, Central Pacific Ocean, and off-loaded 25,200 55-gallon drums (1,386,000 gallons) of Herbicide Orange. From mid-April 1972 until mid-July when Operation PACER HO commenced, the inventory required continual maintenance because of the deteriorating condition of the drums.

When the Herbicide Orange (HO) stocks arrived at Johnston Island, the entire inventory was placed in the northwest corner of the Atoll adjacent to weapon storage area for the chemical weapons returned during Operation Red Hat and immediately fenced off. The Red Hat and inventory storage area were identified as an area “off limits” to military and civilian employees. The location of the storage area was important because it was located in an area where the prevailing winds would blow any vapors and odor away from the Island and away from where temporary personnel and semi-permanent residents were quartered and messed.

== Arrival ==
In April 1972, 25,266 55-gallon drums of Agent Orange were received and placed in storage on Johnston Atoll. Of the total drums received, 8,990 developed leaks. Of those leakers, 4,050 had the remaining contents transferred to new drums, 4,668 had been repaired without transfer of the contents, and 14 remained to be "reworked" which decreased the total number of stored drums of herbicide by 258. 4,804 contaminated empty drums were also stored to await disposition. These were drums that were leaking when originally received (not counted above), drums redrummed while in storage, and new drums which showed leaks during transfer. Therefore, it wasn’t possible to reconcile the above numbers with the total number of contamination drums.

With the arrival of HO, there were numerous visits to the island by the USAF, the U.S. Environmental Protection Agency (EPA), and contractor personnel concerned with HO disposal operations. A total of 24,795 drums of Herbicide Orange were processed between 27 July and 23 August 1977.
