= SS Auriga (1944) =

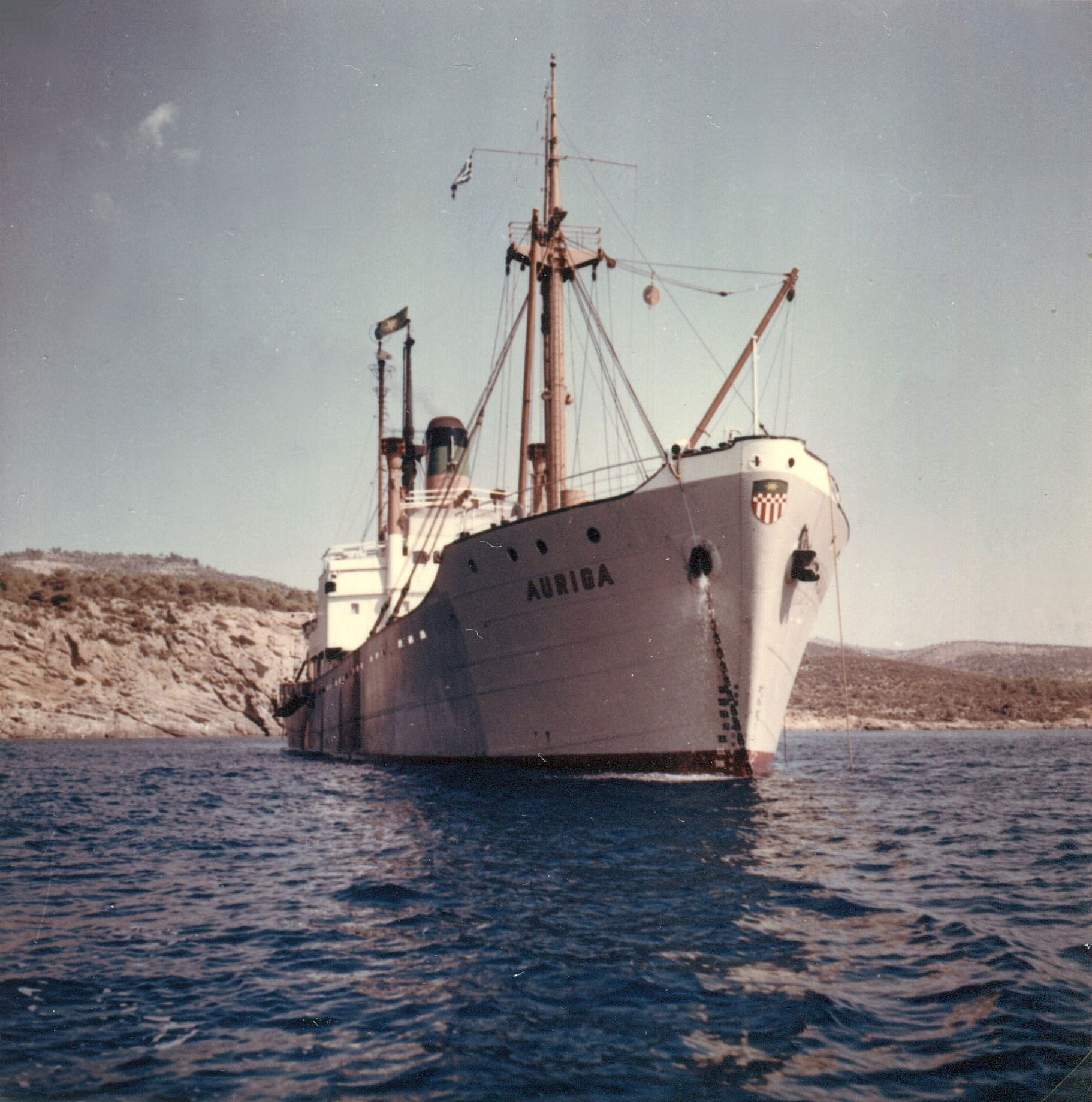

History
- Name: Adamsturm (1944-45); Empire Ganymede (1945-47); Baltanglia (1947-52); Baltic Pine (1952-54); Germania (1954-55); Auriga (1955-65)
- Owner: Deutsche Dampfschifffarts-Gesellschaft Hansa (1944-45); Ministry of War Transport (1945-46); Ministry of Transport (1946-47); United Baltic Corporation (1947-54); Hellenic Lines (1954-55); Crainer Kinsley Freight Co. Ltd (1955-56); Partrederi Auriga ved Adler & Söhne (1956-65)
- Operator: Deutsche Dampfschifffarts-Gesellschaft Hansa (1944-45); Glen & Co Ltd (1945-47); United Baltic Corporation (1947-54); Hellenic Lines (1954-55); Argo Line (1956-65)
- Port of registry: (Nazi Germany) Bremen, Germany (1944-45); London, United Kingdom (1945-54); Piraeus, Greece (1954-56); Bremen, West Germany (1956-65)
- Builder: Deutsche Werft
- Yard number: 433
- Laid down: 16 March 1944
- Launched: 16 June 1944
- Completed: 29 August 1944
- Out of service: 1965
- Identification: Code Letters DOYS (1944-45); United Kingdom Official Number 180612 (1945-55); Code Letters GKWX (1945-54); Code Letters DLCM (1955-65); IMO number: 5503090 ( –1965)
- Fate: Scrapped

General characteristics
- Class & type: Hansa A type Cargo ship
- Tonnage: 1,923 GRT, 935 NRT, 3,000 DWT
- Length: 85.22 m (279 ft 7 in)
- Beam: 13.51 m (44 ft 4 in)
- Depth: 4.80 m (15 ft 9 in)
- Installed power: Compound steam engine, 1,200IHP
- Propulsion: Single screw propeller
- Speed: 10.5 knots (19.4 km/h)
- Crew: 25, plus 8-10 gunners (during wartime)

Auriga was a Hansa A Type cargo ship which was built as Adamsturm in 1944 by Deutsche Werft, Hamburg, Germany for Deutsche Dampfschifffarts-Gesellschaft Hansa, Bremen Germany. She was seized as a prize of war in 1945, passing to the Ministry of War Transport and renamed Empire Gantry. She was sold in 1947 and was renamed Baltanglia. She was renamed Baltic Pine in 1952. Sold to Greece in 1954, and renamed Germania, she was declared a constructive total loss following a collision in 1955. Sold to Germany, she was repaired and renamed Auriga. She served until 1965, when she was scrapped.

== Description ==
The ship was 85.22 m (279 ft 7 in) long, with a beam of 13.51 m (44 ft 4 in). She had a depth of 4.80 m (15 ft 9 in). She was assessed as 1,925 GRT, 935 NRT, 3,000 DWT.

The ship was propelled by a compound steam engine, which had two cylinders of 42 cm (16 9/16 in) and two cylinders of 90 cm (35 7/16 in) diameter by 90 cm (35 7/16 in) inches stroke. The engine was built by Ottensener Eisenwerk AG, Hamburg, Germany. Rated at 1,200IHP, it drove a single screw propeller and could propel the ship at 10.5 knots (19.4 km/h).

The ship had a complement of 25, plus 8-10 gunners during wartime. She was equipped with 1×30-tonne, 1×10-tonne and 10×5-tonne cranes.

== History ==
Adamsturm was a Hansa A Type cargo ship built in 1944 as yard number 433 by Deutsche Werft, Hamburg, Germany for Deutsche Dampfschifffarts-Gesellschaft Hansa, Bremen, Germany. Her keel was laid on 16 March 1945. She was launched on 16 June 1944 and completed on 29 August. Her port of registry was Bremen, and the Code Letters DOYS were allocated. She was damaged on 23 October 1944 at Kirkenes, Norway in an attack by Soviet aircraft. Adamsturm was also damaged on 1 January 1945 in the Skaggerak and on 4 April at Hamburg in attacks by Allied aircraft. On 9 May 1945, Adamsturm was seized as a prize of war at Hamburg. She was passed to the Ministry of War Transport and was renamed Empire Ganymede. She was delivered to Methil on 11 July. The Code Letters GKWX and United Kingdom Official Number 180612 were allocated. Her port of registry was London and she was operated under the management of Glen & Co, Ltd., Glasgow.

In 1947, Empire Ganymede was sold to the United Baltic Corporation and was renamed Baltanglia. She was renamed Baltic Pine in 1952.

On 20 April 1954, Baltic Pine was sold to Hellenic Lines, Greece and was renamed Germania. Her port of registry was Piraeus. On 26 April 1955, she collided with the Panamanian steamship Maro 4 nautical miles (7.4 km) off Beachy Head, Sussex, United Kingdom in fog and then ran aground near the Beachy Head Lighthouse and broke in two. Twenty-three of her 26 crew were taken off by the Eastbourne Lifeboat Beryl Tollemache; three remaining on board to safely release steam from her boilers. The coxwain of the Eastbourne Lifeboat was awarded the Maud Smith Award for his part in the rescue. On 6 May, men employed in the salvage of Germania had to be rescued from the ship when they became trapped by a gale. The Eastbourne and Newhaven Lifeboats and helicopters from RNAS Ford were involved in the rescue.

Although declared a constructive total loss, she was sold to Crainer Kinsley Freight Co. Ltd. Salvage was undertaken by Mylchcreest Noble Ltd. Each half was refloated on 30 November and beached at Pevensey Bay, Sussex.

Germania was sold in February 1956 to Partrederi Auriga ved Adler & Söhne, Bremen. She was towed to Bremen on 16 February by the tug Vanquisher. She was repaired by Adler Werft. Photographs show that her bridge and funnel were altered. Repairs were completed on 30 June. She was renamed Auriga. Her port of registry was Bremen and the Code Letters DLCM were allocated. She was operated under the management of Argo Line, Bremen. With their introduction in the 1960s, Auriga was allocated the IMO Number 5503090. She served until 1965, arriving at Bremerhaven on 24 January for scrapping by Eisen und Metall.
