= Operation Pacer HO =

1977 military operation

Operation Pacer HO was a 1977 operation of the U.S. Air Force that incinerated the Agent Orange stored at Johnston Atoll aboard the Dutch-owned ship M/T Vulcanus in 1977. "HO" was an abbreviation of Herbicide Orange (HO). Operation Pacer IVY (InVentorY) was an associated United States Department of Defense mission to inventory, collect, consolidate, re-drum, remove from the Southeast Asian theater, and store Agent Orange.

== Pre-disposal Study ==
Disposal of the Herbicide Orange under Operation Pacer HO was to begin in the fall of 1974, but because of various delays by the United States Environmental Protection Agency (EPA) and Air Force budget limitation, disposal was postponed until the fall of 1976. Work was then completed on the drum crusher and work area at Johnston Atoll for the transfer of HO from 55 U.S. gal (210 L; 46 imp gal) drums to an R-5 refueler truck, and later for transfer to the incinerator ship. The redrumming activity began on September 30, 1974. As a part of the effort to dispose of the HO stored at Johnston Atoll and Gulfport, Mississippi, an attempt was made to filter out the 2,3,7,8-Tetrachlorodibenzodioxin (TCDD), using filters of coconut charcoal so that the Agents could be re-used or re-sold. The twelve cylindrical filters used at Gulfport, Mississippi, contained approximately 13 g (0.46 oz) of the contaminant TCDD. They were transferred to Johnston Atoll on December 8, 1976, and were stored in Bunker 785 while awaiting final disposition. While the TCDD was successfully removed, the resultant filters created a disposal problem beyond current technology.

== Disposal ==
On April 26, 1977, the EPA issued a research permit to burn the 15,000 55-gallon drums (825,000 U.S. gal (3,120,000 L; 687,000 imp gal)) of HO from Gulfport, Mississippi, during July 1977. Modification of the redrumming facility, installation of needed utilities and communications, and requisitioning/positioning of logistics support (i.e., R-5 refuelers, forklifts, personnel protective equipment) were accomplished in May and June in preparation for the re-drumming operation.

From May to June 1977, Air Force personnel from the five Combat Logistics Support Squadrons (CLSS) on Temporary Duty at the U.S. Naval Construction Battalion (Seabee) Base at Gulfport, Mississippi transferred 800,000 U.S. gal (3,000,000 L; 670,000 imp gal) of Herbicide Orange from the stored drums to rail tank cars, which were subsequently transferred to the Vulcanus at the dock.

The Vulcanus, with its crew of 18 foreign nationals and the load of HO from Gulfport, Mississippi, arrived at Johnston Atoll on July 10, 1977. The monitoring equipment that had been airlifted to Johnston Atoll from the TRW Corporation at Redondo Beach, California, was immediately installed. Food, fresh water, and 30,985 U.S. gal (117,290 L; 25,800 imp gal) of diesel fuel were loaded from Johnston Atoll stocks. The Vulcanus sailed for the burn site (15°45'-17°45' N longitude, 171°30'-173°30' W latitude) with seven monitors and one EPA representative as passengers. Incineration began at 0030Z (Zulu time) July 15, 1977.

A special airlift mission was flown on July 21, 1977 in support of the operation. It flew from Hickam AFB to Johnston Atoll with a special seat configuration for 80 passengers and brought 61 new employees to perform the de-drumming. Additionally, 29 personnel who were already on Johnston Atoll under contract were used for the de-drumming phase of the operation. The Vulcanus finished incinerating the Gulfport, Mississippi, HO on July 24, 1977, and docked at Johnston Atoll at 0130Z July 26, 1977. A second special airlift mission departed Johnston Atoll 1615Z July 26, 1977, with the exhaust samples taken from the first burn. Its destination was Wright Patterson AFB, Ohio, where Wright State University analyzed the samples to determine the efficiency of the destruction of the TCDD in the HO.

In the interim and following two days of debriefings, EPA representatives granted permission on July 27, 1977, to proceed with the de-drumming of the HO stored at Johnston Atoll. This authorization specified that only half of the capacity of the Vulcanus could be loaded without a formal go-ahead from the EPA, because if the data from the first burn did not meet EPA specifications, the second half of the ship would have to be loaded with diesel fuel and a burn of 50 percent HO and 50 percent diesel would have to be conducted. During the first burn, the incinerator was extinguished by an unknown liquid at which time a cloud of exhaust plume engulfed the ship. To ensure no harm occurred to the crew or monitors, complete physicals were given to 26 people at the Johnston Atoll dispensary while the ship was being loaded for the second burn.

Based on the analysis of the exhaust samples from the first burn, a permit was issued on August 4, 1977, authorizing incineration of the remaining HO at Johnston Atoll. Loading of the second half of the HO on the Vulcanus was completed and it sailed at 1830Z August 6, 1977, with the second burn beginning at 0900Z August 7, 1977. A total of 30,875 U.S. gal (116,870 L; 25,709 imp gal) of diesel was loaded for this trip. When the second burn was completed, the Vulcanus returned to Johnston Atoll at 1830Z August 17, 1977.

The loading of the final drums of herbicide was completed on 1920Z August 23, 1977, a total of 24,795 drums had been loaded by that time. The Vulcanus sailed for the third burn with final incineration beginning at 1800Z August 24, 1977. A total of 24,170 U.S. gal (91,500 L; 20,130 imp gal) of diesel fuel was provided by Johnston Atoll. The third burn was completed at 2150Z September 3, 1977, and the Vulcanus returned to Johnston Atoll the next day.

The Vulcanus sailed out one more time from September 6–8, 1977, to burn the diesel fuel which had been used to rinse any residual HO from its holding tanks and to discharge the sea water which had also been used to rinse the tanks. A total of 11,716 U.S. gal (44,350 L; 9,756 imp gal) of diesel was provided for this voyage. The cleanup of the storage area and disposal of the dunnage on which the drums had been stored was completed on September 12, 1977.
