= SS Uhenfels =

German naval ship

History

Germany
- Name: Uhenfels (1931–40); Empire Ability (1940–41)
- Owner: DDG Hansa (1931–39); Ministry of Shipping (1939–41)
- Operator: DDG Hansa (1931–39); Elder Dempster Lines Ltd (1939-41)
- Port of registry: Bremen (1931–39); Liverpool (1939–41)
- Builder: Deschimag, Bremen
- Yard number: 886
- Launched: January 1931
- Completed: March 1931
- Identification: Code letters QMLD (1931–33); Call sign DOKS (1934–39); Call sign GQJY (1939–41); UK official number 167423 (1939–41)
- Captured: by HMS Hereward, 5 November 1939
- Fate: Sunk, 27 June 1941

General characteristics
- Type: heavy-lift ship
- Tonnage: 7,603 GRT, 4,570 NRT
- Length: 503.9 ft (153.6 m)
- Beam: 62.2 ft (19.0 m)
- Draught: 27.7 ft (8.4 m)
- Installed power: 672 NHP
- Propulsion: 3-cylinder triple-expansion engine; plus exhaust steam turbine
- Speed: 13.7 knots (25.4 km/h)
- Capacity: 12 passengers
- Crew: 64
- Notes: sister ships: Lichtenfels, Freienfels, Geierfels

SS Uhenfels was a German-built heavy-lift ship that was launched in 1931 for DDG Hansa. She was captured by the Royal Navy in 1939, two months after the start of the Second World War. The UK Ministry of Shipping renamed her Empire Ability and contracted Elder Dempster Lines to operate her. In 1941 a German U-boat sank her by torpedo.

== Building ==
Deschimag built Lichtenfels at its "Weser" yard in Bremen. She was launched in January 1931 and completed in March. She was the last of four heavy-lift sister ships that Deschimag built for DDG Hansa. The others were Lichtenfels and Freienfels launched in 1929 and Geierfels launched in 1930. She carried heavy cargo such as railway locomotives.

Uhenfels was built with a Maierform bow with a convex profile, which was meant to improve both her speed and her handling. She had a three-cylinder triple-expansion engine plus a Bauer-Wach low-pressure exhaust steam turbine. Exhaust steam from the low-pressure cylinder of the triple-expansion engine powered the turbine. The turbine drove the same shaft as the piston engine by double-reduction gearing and a Föttinger fluid coupling. The combined power of her piston engine and turbine was 672 NHP.

== Capture ==
When the Second World War began in September 1939 Uhenfels was in the Indian Ocean. She made a number of attempts to return home. On her third attempt she left Lourenço Marques in Portuguese East Africa disguised as the Dutch merchant Aagtekerk. Her cargo included opium worth £250,000, plus cotton and hides.

Three of her crew deserted before she left Lourenço Marques. They made their way to Zululand, where police arrested them and took them to Maritzburg. After being fined, they were interned in South Africa for the duration of the war.

Uhenfels reached the Atlantic, but there she ran into the Royal Navy's Force K, which had been deployed in search of the German cruiser Admiral Graf Spee. The force included the aircraft carrier HMS Ark Royal, whose aircraft had spotted another German merchant the previous month, the German tanker Altmark. But Altmark had been disguised as the US tanker Delmar, and so had escaped unmolested.

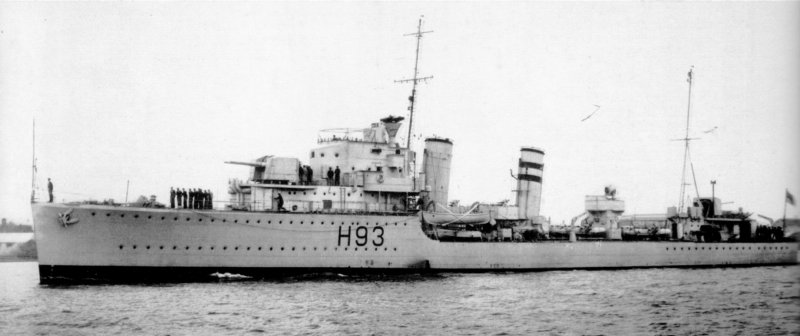
HMS Hereward, which captured Uhenfels in November 1940

On 5 November, two aircraft reported Uhenfels, and the destroyer HMS Hereward was sent to intercept her. Uhenfels' crew tried to scuttle her but a boarding party from Hereward prevented them. The Royal Navy brought her to Freetown the next day. The 61 crew were marched to an internment camp ashore, defiantly singing Nazi songs.

By the time she had been captured the Uhenfels was running short of food. Uhenfels was then taken to Gibraltar for dry docking and inspection, arriving on 18 March. She reached London on 5 April 1940, the first captured German vessel to arrive in port in the Second World War. Her cargo comprised maize, palm kernels and other food from the West Indies. She was also carrying 122 tanned sheepskins, which were offered for sale by public tender "in prize".

== Empire Ability ==
In April 1940, the UK Ministry of Shipping renamed the ship as Empire Ability and contracted Elder Dempster Lines to operate her.

On 23 October 1940, she was among the ships bombed and damaged by German aircraft while waiting in Gare Loch for a convoy to assemble. In December 1940 Empire Ability left the Firth of Clyde for Egypt via Freetown and Durban, reaching Suez in February 1941.

On 27 February 1941, the Italian submarine Michele Bianchi attacked Convoy OB 290 in the North Atlantic and claimed to have scored a probable hit on the Empire Ability. In fact she was not there, and was in the Red Sea at the time.

Empire Ability returned via Port Louis, Durban, Cape Town and Freetown, where she waited for a fortnight for a convoy to Liverpool. She was carrying a cargo of 7,725 tons of sugar, 238 tons of rum, 400 tons of palm kernels and 35 tons of fibre, and her Master was Herbert Flowerdew.

Position of the sinking of Empire Ability

On 18 June 1941, Empire Ability left Freetown with Convoy SL 78. On 27 June the German submarine U-69 attacked the convoy 200 miles southeast of the Azores. U-69's commander, Jost Metzler, made several attacks, sinking River Lugar at 0149 hours and hitting Empire Ability at 0237 hours with a single torpedo. Empire Ability caught fire and was abandoned, sinking at 23°50′N 21°10′W 21 minutes after having been hit.

Two people were killed. A total of 107 crew, DEMS gunners, military personnel and passengers successfully abandoned ship. The steamship Amerika rescued survivors and transferred them to the corvette HMS Burdock. They were later landed at Milford Haven. Those lost on Empire Ability are commemorated at the Tower Hill Memorial, London.

== Identification ==
Uhenfels' code letters were QMLD until 1933. In 1934, they were superseded by the call sign DOKS.

When the UK Ministry of shipping renamed the ship Empire Ability, she was given the UK official number 167423 and her call sign was changed to GQJY.

== Bibliography ==
- Jameson, William (2004) [1957]. Ark Royal: the life of an aircraft carrier at war 1939-41 (2nd ed.). Reading: Periscope Publishing. ISBN 1-904381-27-8.
- Rossiter, Mike (2007) [2006]. Ark Royal: the life, death and rediscovery of the legendary Second World War aircraft carrier (2nd ed.). London: Corgi Books. ISBN 978-0-552-15369-0. OCLC 81453068.
