= Denholm Group =

- Type: Private company
- Industry: Maritime, Shipping, Logistics, Industrial Services
- Founded: 1866
- Headquarters: Glasgow, Scotland, UK Other locations in Manchester, Liverpool, Felixstowe, London
- Key people: Ben MacLehose, CEO Simon Preston, COO
- Revenue: £429m
- Operating income: £24m
- Net income: £17m
- Number of employees: 1,594
- Subsidiaries: Shipping, Logistics, Seafoods, Industrial Services
- Website: www.denholm-group.co.uk

Denholm Group is a British shipping, maritime and logistics company based in Glasgow, United Kingdom. It was founded by John Denholm of Greenock in 1866 and in 2023 had an annual turnover of £429 million. It employs over 1,500 people around the world.

== Services ==
Shipping: The Group owns and operate handysize bulk carriers. This business is supported by a small shipbroking business. They also have an 11% investment in Hadley Shipping, operate a number of ships, and has a 26.17% stake in Anglo-Eastern Univan Group Limited, which is one of the largest managers of ships in the world and has offices around the globe.

Logistics: Compromises a number of companies undertaking port and liner agency, stevedoring, freight forwarding, short sea shipping, warehousing and distribution. The business is predominately based in various locations across the UK and Ireland.

Seafoods: The Group owns a factory in Peterhead which is a primary processor of pelagic fish, sourcing fish locally. The processed product is predominantly exported to Europe, Africa, and the Far East. They carry our Fishing related activities in Scotland and Northern Ireland. Its activities are in support of the fishing industry and its local communities: selling fish catches, providing operational support to fishing companies, the supply of chandlery products and fuel, and investing in fishing boats and quota to benefit wider fishing operations.

Industrial Services: Provides industrial painting, access solutions and surface preparation services in the UK. Key markets are UK dockyards, infrastructure assets, the house building industry and local authorities.

== Acquisitions ==
In 2021, Denholm Group acquired Good Logistics.

In February 2023 the Group acquired MV Keila, her fishing licence and her quota for f9.4m. Then in May they sold Keila to Norlan BF362 LLP for £3.9m, retaining the quota, and acquired a 21.49% interest in Norlan BF362 LLP for a consideration of £0.9m.

In October 2023, the Group completed the acquisition of Inter-Ways Ltd, a freight forwarding business specialising in European road haulage business, for a net consideration of £1.1m.

In November 2023, the Group established a joint venture freight forwarding company to represent it and its partners interest in China and purchased a 58% interest in Denholm Universal Limited (formerly Universal Coatings & Services Ltd), an industrial painting business based on Teesside, for a performance based consideration of up to £0.9m

In December 2023, the Group completed the acquisition of a package of fishing quota for a consideration of £1.8m and entered into a £13m contract with Harland & Wolff to undertake the painting and scaffolding on the FPSO Sea Rose in early 2024.

== Marine Services ==
Marine Services is a joint venture between Denholm Group and Serco to provide to support the United Kingdom's Naval Service. Marine Services is responsible for fleet support at the three main UK naval bases, HMNB Portsmouth, HMNB Devonport and HMNB Clyde.
