= SS Palmyra (1944) =

History
- Name: Fangturm (1944–45); Empire Gallop (1945–47); Baltonia (1947–53); Baltic Oak (1953–57); Palmyra (1957–62)
- Owner: DDG Hansa (1944–45); Ministry of War Transport (1945–46); Ministry of Transport (1946); United Baltic Corporation (1946–57); Bock, Godeffroy & Co (1957–62)
- Operator: DDG Hansa (1944–45); PD Hendry & Sons (1945–46); United Baltic Corporation (1946–57); Deutsche Levant Linie (1957–62)
- Port of registry: (Nazi Germany) Bremen (1944–45); (United Kingdom) London (1945–57); (West Germany) Hamburg (1957-62)
- Builder: Deutsche Werft
- Yard number: 448
- Launched: 23 October 1944
- Completed: 29 December 1944
- Out of service: 1962
- Identification: call sign DOYT (1944–45); UK official number 180674 (1945–57); call sign GJKM (1945–57); call sign DIQF (1957–62)
- Fate: Sunk in a collision

General characteristics
- Class & type: Hansa A type cargo ship
- Tonnage: 1,944 GRT, 985 NRT, 3,200 DWT
- Length: 87.68 m (287 ft 8 in)
- Beam: 13.51 m (44 ft 4 in)
- Draught: 5.59 m (18 ft 4 in)
- Depth: 4.80 m (15 ft 9 in)
- Installed power: Compound steam engine, 1,200IHP
- Propulsion: Single screw propeller
- Speed: 10.5 knots (19.4 km/h)

Palmyra was a Hansa A Type cargo ship which was built as Fangturm in 1944 by Deutsche Werft, Hamburg, Germany for Hansa Line, Bremen, Germany. She was seized as a prize of war in 1945, passing to the Ministry of War Transport and renamed Empire Gallop. She was sold in 1947 and renamed Baltonia, the Baltic Oak in 1953. She was sold to West Germany in 1957 and renamed Palmyra. She served until 1962, when she was sunk in a collision with another ship.

== Description ==
The ship was 87.68 m (287 ft 8 in) long, with a beam of 13.51 m (44 ft 4 in). She had a depth of 4.80 m (15 ft 9 in), and a draught of 5.59 m (18 ft 4 in). She was assessed as 1,944 GRT, 965 NRT, 3,200 DWT.

The ship was propelled by a compound steam engine, which had two cylinders of 42 cm (16 9/16 inches) and two cylinders of 90 cm (35 7/16 inches) diameter by 90 cm (35 7/16 inches) stroke. The engine was built by Deutsche Werft. Rated at 1,200IHP, it drove a single screw propeller and could propel the ship at 10.5 knots (19.4 km/h).

== History ==
Fangturm was a Hansa A Type cargo ship built in 1944 as yard number 448 by Deutsche Werft, Hamburg, Germany for Hansa Line, Bremen, Germany. She was launched on 23 October 1944 and completed on 29 December. Her port of registry was Bremen, and the Code Letters DOYT were allocated.

In May 1945, Fangturm was seized as a prize of war at Kiel. She was passed to the Ministry of War Transport and renamed Empire Gallop. Her United Kingdom official number was 180674 and her call sign was GJKM. She was registered in London and managed by PD Hendry & Sons.

on 26 November 1946, Empire Gallop was sold to the United Baltic Corporation, London. She was renamed Baltonia in 1947. Her port of registry was London. She was renamed Baltic Oak in 1953.

Baltic Oak was sold to Bock, Godeffroy & Co, Hamburg, West Germany in 1957 and was renamed Palmyra. Her port of registry was Hamburg and the Code Letters DIQF were allocated. She was operated under the management of the Deutsche Levant Linie. On 27 March 1962, she collided with the British merchant ship British Mariner and sank 18 nautical miles (33 km) west of Ouessant, Finistère, France. Palmyra was on a voyage from Hamburg to Istanbul, Turkey with a cargo of vehicles, steel and general cargo. British Mariner put in to the River Tyne for inspection. She was deemed a constructive total loss and was scrapped.
