= DDG Hansa =

German shipping company

Deutsche Dampfschiffahrts-Gesellschaft Hansa (DDG Hansa)
- DDG Hansa house flag
- Type: Shipping
- Industry: sea and coastal freight water transport (NACE 50.2) water transport
- Founded: 3 December 1881
- Defunct: 1980

DDG Hansa, short for Deutsche Dampfschiffahrts-Gesellschaft Hansa (German Steamship Company Hansa; in modern orthography, Deutsche Dampfschifffahrts-Gesellschaft Hansa) was a major German shipping company specialising in heavy freight and scheduled traffic between Europe and the Far East. Founded in Bremen in 1881, the company declared bankruptcy in 1980.

== History ==
=== Foundation and early years ===
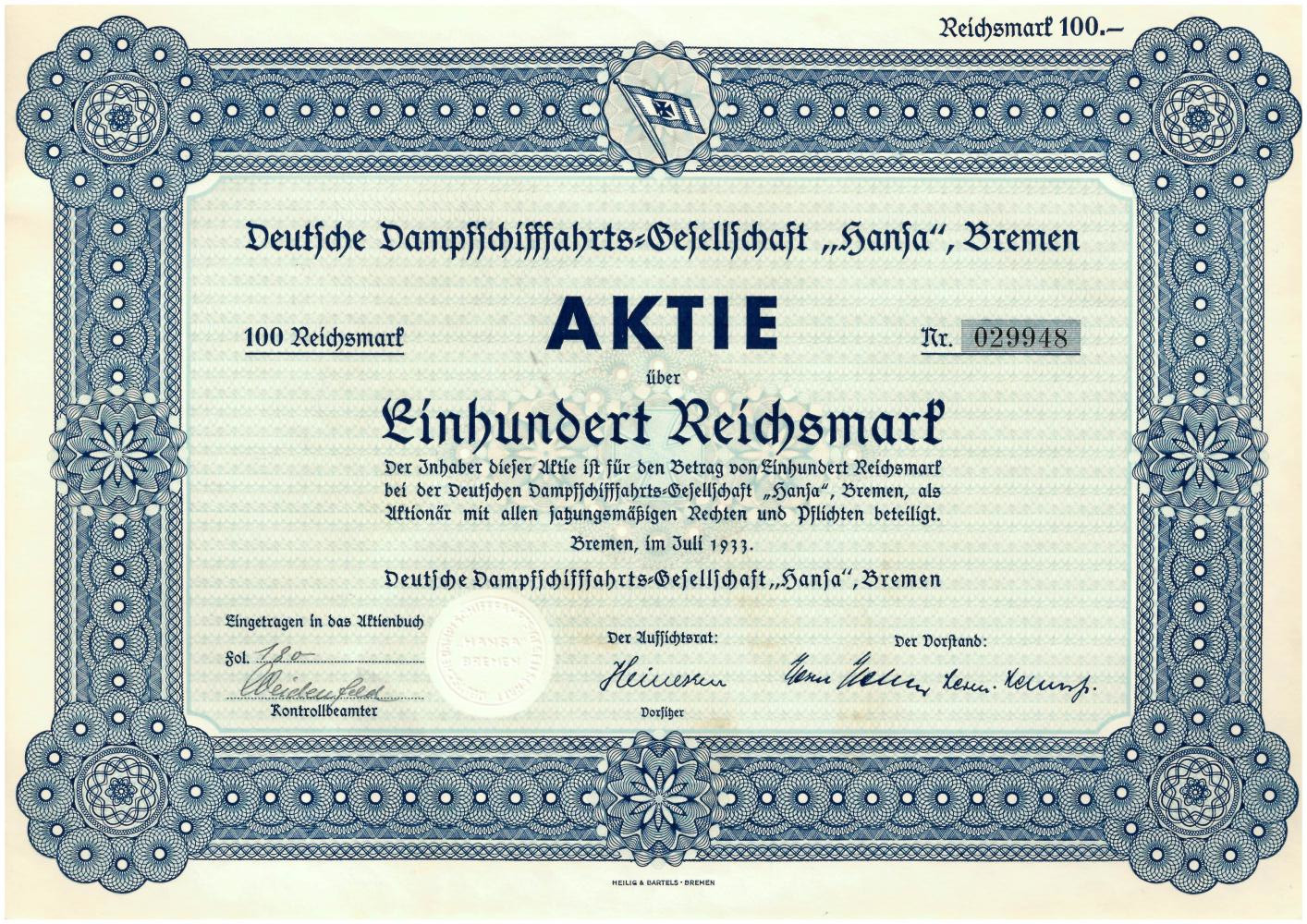
Share of the DDG Hansa, issued July 1933

DDG Hansa was founded on 3 December 1881 at the "constituent general assembly" in Bremen by a consortium of 17 Bremen and 2 Bremerhaven companies, to provide steamship connections for trade with Asia, the Baltic, and the Mediterranean. The first voyage was by Stolzenfels from Newcastle to Singapore in February 1882. Regular service began in 1882 with seven ships. Under its first head, Oltmann Johann Dietrich Ahlers, the company withdrew from the Baltic and limited its Mediterranean activities to the Iberian Peninsula, but its affiliate the Asiatische Linie was able to compete well in trade with India by concentrating on the less well served East Coast ports, and the fleet was expanded with newer ships. The two companies merged in 1894 and by 1899 the company had 40 ships. The routes were also expanded, for example to South America in the 1890s. In 1910 Ahlers was succeeded as Chairman of the Board by Hermann Helms (1868–1942). In 1912, diesel power was introduced; in 1914, the line had 66 steamships and one motor-powered ship, and with a total gross register tonnage of 437,789, was the world's largest freight shipping company and the third largest shipping company in Germany.

=== World Wars ===
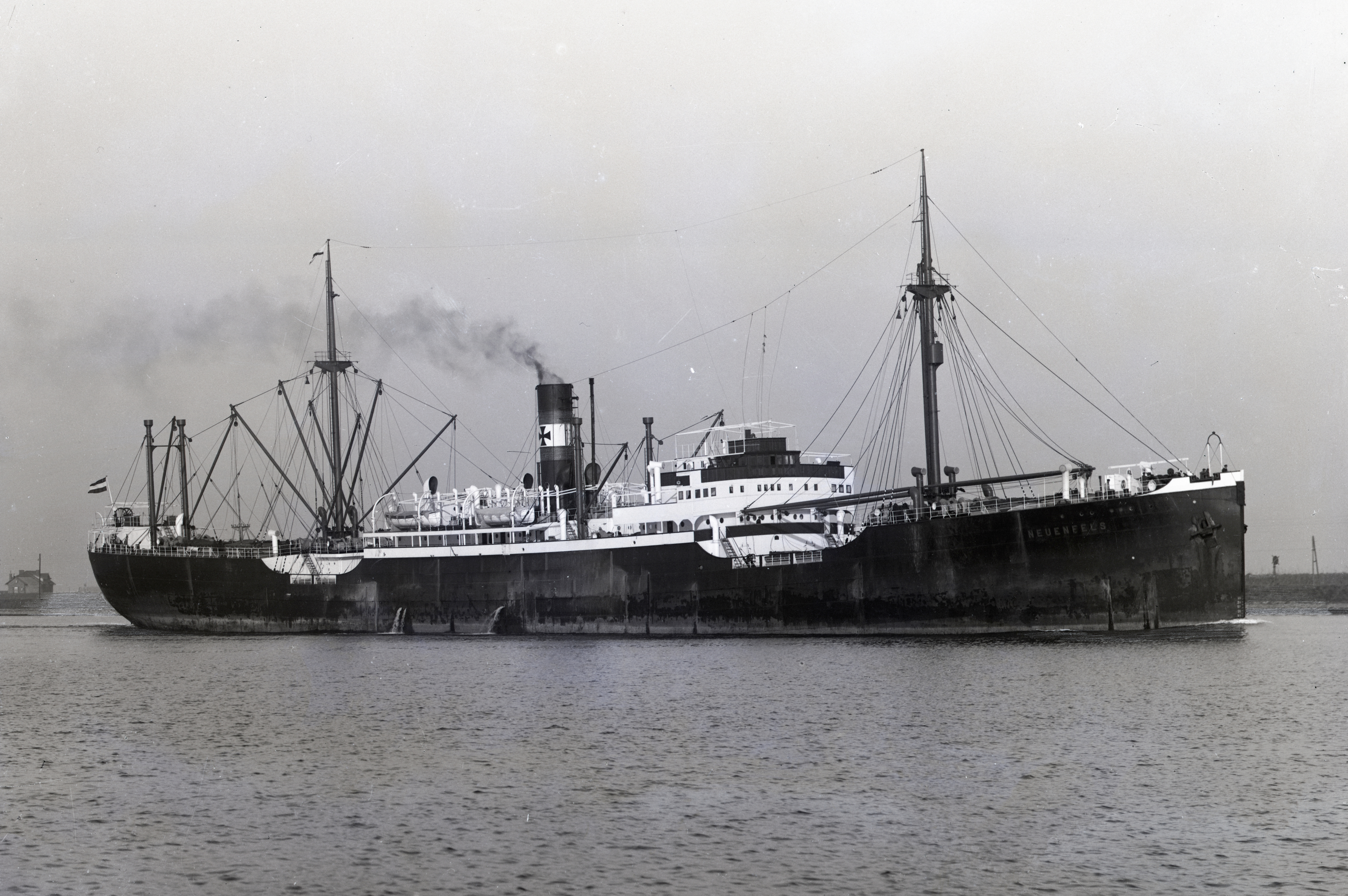
General cargo ship Neuenfels (1925)

In World War I the company lost 81 vessels, a total of 437,489 GRT, all but one ship, the Soneck, with which service to Spain resumed in August 1919. Helms, who remained head of the company until 1940, rebuilt the fleet. Service to India resumed in 1920. With a view to meeting the demand for delivery of railway locomotives to British India, Hansa took delivery in 1929 of SS Lichtenfels, the first modern heavy lift ship, with a crane capable of lifting 120 tonnes. Beginning in 1922, the company also began doing increasing business with Persia and the Arab states around the Persian Gulf. 19 ships had to be laid up during the Great Depression of the early 1930s, but after that DDG Hansa expanded once more, to become the largest heavy freight shipping line in the world. At the start of World War II in 1939, the company were operating several lines to India, a monthly service between the US and the Persian Gulf, and a bimonthly service between the US and southern and East Africa.

=== Postwar ===
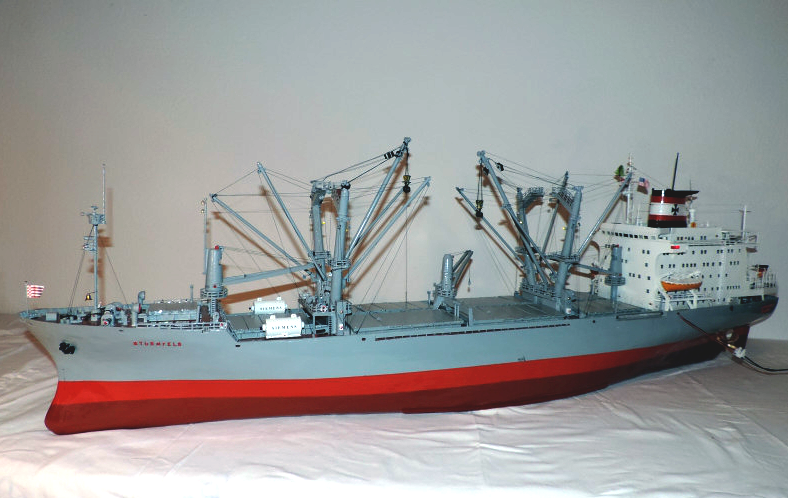
Model of the DDG Hansa training and heavy lift ship Sturmfels (1972)

After World War II, DDG Hansa had lost all their ships to bombing and seizure by the Allies, and the headquarters building was demolished. From 1943 to 1969, the chairman was Hermann Helms (1898–1983), son of the previous chairman; he was succeeded in turn by his son, also Hermann Helms. In 1948, the company restarted, at first in shipwreck recovery and towing using barges, and then in 1950 resuming freight service to India and Persia with three secondhand ships. In 1956, the company had a fleet of 44 ships, mostly second-hand and new heavy freighters, sailing between Bremen, India, Pakistan, Ceylon, Burma, and the Persian Gulf. The company continued to have a reputation for innovation. The Lichtenfels-series of heavy freighters, beginning in 1954 with MT Lichtenfels, were the first heavy lift ships equipped with the Stülcken derrick. They also had an unusual deck configuration, with the wheelhouse in the bow and the other superstructure aft, leading to the nickname 'Picasso ships'.

Beginning in 1965, the company diversified into platform supply vessels, three years later making this a separate division, Offshore Supply Association (OSA), in partnership with VTG AG of Hamburg. The company also diversified into the container field, including experimentation with floating containers, and Roll-on/roll-off cargo haulage; Mariaeck and Brunneck, commissioned in 1968, could handle up to 800 tonnes of RoRo cargo, and in the 1970s DDG Hansa circumvented congestion problems at Persian Gulf and Red Sea ports by using large RoRo ships and its own terminals. Through subsidiaries, the company also owned and operated incinerator ships burning chemical waste, beginning with the MT Vulcanus. MT Stahleck, built in 1977, operated worldwide carrying especially large and heavy loads and was the model for the John Henry and the Paul Bunyan of American Heavy Lift Shipping Company of Pittsburgh, and Hansa employees trained and assisted their crews. It was the world's largest heavy lift shipping company.

=== Bankruptcy ===
In the second half of the 1970s, DDG Hansa invested large amounts of money updating the fleet and diversifying; a bad economic climate and the weakness of the U.S. dollar against the mark then led to financial difficulties. Attempts by the company to reduce high labour costs by "outflagging" ships to the Philippines flag were not sufficient to staunch losses, even though its foreign flag fleet was profitable. Deutsche Bank and two insurance companies came to own 80% of the company; in 1979, its financial assets were sold to Hapag Lloyd; and the loss of business in Iran as a result of the 1979 revolution finally caused the company to file for bankruptcy on 18 August 1980. The company ceased operations by 31 December that year. The ships were taken over by other companies, the lines and the container business by Hapag-Lloyd, the platform service business by VTG, and many of the heavy lift ships were sold to a Greek owner who used the name 'Hansa Heavy Lift' and changed the names of the ships to end in -bels. The brand name DDG Hansa was sold in 1984 to Project Carries and is now owned by Deutsche Seereederei of Rostock, operating as Interhansa AG (previously Reederei Hansa AG).

== Ships ==
DDG Hansa gave their ships names ending in -fels, -burg, -eck and -turm (rock, fort, crag, tower). The "-fels" ending was so common, e.g. Freienfels, Goldenfels, Schneefels, Uhenfels, Wachtfels, that they were collectively referred to as the "Fels ships". A harbour basin in Rotterdam was named Felshaven in honour of the line.

=== List of DDG Hansa ships ===
- SS Drachenfels (1882)
- SS Enrenfels (1882)
- SS Stolzenfels (1882)
- SS Borgfelds (1884)
- SS Trifels (1888)
- SS Wartburg (1888)
- SS Gutenfels (1889)
- SS Rheinfels (1889)
- SS Marcobrunner (1889)
- SS Rudesheimer (1889)
- SS Rauenthaler (1889)
- SS Hochheimer (1889)
- SS Heimburg (1889)
- SS Johannisberger (1890)
- SS Scharlachberger (1890)
- SS Schönburg (1890)
- SS Löwenburg (1891)
- SS Marxburg (1891)
- SS Braunfels (1891)
- SS Arensburg (1891)
- SS Stolzenfels (1893)
- SS Rothenfels (1893)
- SS Marienburg (1894)
- SS Harzburg (1894)
- SS Lindenfels (1894)
- SS Steinberger (1895)
- SS Ockenfels (1895)
- SS Goldenfels (1895)
- SS Minneburg (1895)
- SS Sonnenburg (1896)
- SS Rudelsburg (1896)
- SS Wolfsburg (1896)
- SS Neidenfels (1896)
- SS Tannenfels (1898)
- SS Hohenfels (1898)
- SS Ehrenfels (1898)
- SS Bärenfels (1898)
- SS Weissenfels (1899)
- SS Drachenfels (1900)
- SS Schwarzenfels (1900)
- SS Argenfels (1901)
- SS Wildenfels (1901)
- SS Neuenfels (1901)
- SS Scharzfels (1901)
- SS Marienfels (1901)
- SS Schönfels (1902)
- SS Soneck (1902)
- SS Stahleck (1902)
- SS Lichtenfels (1903)
- SS Liebenfels (1903)
- SS Werdenfels (1903)
- SS Ehrenfels (1903)
- SS Reichenfels (1903)
- SS Rabenfels (1903)
- SS Wartenfels (1903)
- SS Trifels (1904)
- SS Trautenfels (1904)
- SS Moltkefels(1904)
- SS Axenfels (1904)
- SS Crostafels (1904)
- SS Kybfels (1904)
- SS Marksburg (1905)
- SS Heimburg (1905)
- SS Ebernburg (1905)
- SS Rheinfels (1905)
- SS Arensburg (1905)
- SS Wartburg(1905)
- SS Gutenfels (1906)
- SS Stolzenfels (1906)
- SS Braunfels (1906)
- SS Rotenfels (1906)
- SS Lindenfels (1906)
- SS Rauenfels (1907)
- SS Uhenfels (1907)
- SS Harzburg (1907)
- SS Löwenburg (1907)
- SS Fangturm (1908)
- SS Warturm (1908)
- SS Adamsturm (1909)
- SS Imkenturm (1909)
- SS Minneburg (1909)
- SS Pagenturm (1909)
- SS Ockenfels (1910) (renamed Argenfels in 1923)
- SS Birkenfels (1910)
- SS Freienfels (1910)
- SS Goldenfels (1911)
- SS Arsterturm (1911)
- SS Schildturm (1911)
- SS Steinturm (1911) (renamed Axenfels in 1923)
- SS Sturmfels (1912)
- SS Kandelfels (1912)
- SS Huberfels (1913)
- SS Lauterfels (1913)
- SS Spitzfels (1913)
- SS Wachtfels (1913)
- SS Schneefels (1913)
- SS Frankenfels (1914)
- SS Lahneck (1914)
- SS Rolandseck (1914)
- SS Trostburg (1914)
- SS Aschenburg (1915)
- SS Wolfsburg (1916)
- SS Rudelsburg (1916)
- SS Altenfels (1916) (renamed Stolzenfels in 1926)
- SS Treuenfels (1917)
- SS Geierfels (1920)
- SS Frauenfels (1920)
- SS Bärenfels (1921)
- SS Marienfels (1921)
- SS Ockenfels (1921)
- SS Sturmfels (1921)
- SS Lauterfels (1921)
- SS Gutenfels (1921)
- SS Falkenfels (1921)
- SS Werdenfels (1921)
- SS Wartenfels (1921)
- SS Liebenfels (1922)
- SS Birkenfels (1922)
- SS Trifels (1922)
- SS Wildenfels (1922)
- SS Drachenfels (1922)
- SS Trautenfels (1922)
- SS Lahneck (1923)
- SS Stahleck (1923)
- MS Schwarzenfels (1925)
- MS Weissenfels(1925)
- MS Neuenfels (1925)
- MS Altenfels (1925)
- MS Braunfels (1927)
- MS Rotenfels (1927)
- SS Wachtfels (1928)
- SS Rauenfels (1928)
- SS Lindenfels (1928)
- SS Treuenfels (1928)
- SS Liebenfels (1929)
- SS Lichtenfels (1929)
- SS Freienfels (1929)
- SS Geierfels (1931)
- SS Uhenfels (1931)
- MS Ehrenfels (1936)
- MS Reichenfels (1936)
- MS Kandelfels (1937)
- MS Kybfels (1937)
- MS Goldenfels (1938)
- SS Rolandseck (1937)
- MS Hohenfels (1938)
- SS Soneck (1938)
- MS Tannenfels (1938)
- SS Schwaneck (1939)
- MS Neidenfels (1939)
- MS Moltkefels (1940)
- MS Finnland (1942)
- SS Kattenturm (1944)
- SS Adamsturm (1944)
- SS Arsterturm (1944)
- SS Fangturm (1944)
- SS Imkenturm (1945)
- SS Pagenturm (1945)
- SS Warturm (1947)
- SS Stahleck (1952) (renamed Kattenturm in 1956)
- MT Lichtenfels (1954)
- MT Vulcanus (1955)
- MT Schwarzenfels
- Stahleck (1977)
