= SS Lowland =

German cargo ship

History
- Name: Kattenturm (1944–46); Empire Eden (1946–47); Lowland (1947–59); Mary Enid (1959–63); Stelianos (1963–64); Marynik (1964–67); Euripides (1967–69)
- Owner: Deutsche Dampfschiffahrts-Gesellschaft Hansa (1944-45); Ministry of War Transport (1945); Ministry of Transport (1945–47); Currie Line Ltd (1947–59); Poseidon Shipping Co (1959–63); Delphic Shipping Co (1963–64); Marynik Compagnia Navigazione (1964–67); P D Marchessini (Far East) Ltd (1967–69)
- Operator: Deutsche Dampfschiffahrts-Gesellschaft Hansa (1944-45); China Navigation Co Ltd (1945); Currie Line Ltd (1945–59); Poseidon Shipping Co (1959–63); Delphic Shipping Co (1963–64); Marynik Compagnia Navigazione (1964–67); Euripides Shipping Co Ltd (1967–69)
- Port of registry: Bremen, Germany (1944–45); London, United Kingdom (1945-47); (United Kingdom) Leith (1947–63); Piraeus, Greece (1959-63); Monrovia, Liberia (1963–67); Panama City, Panama (1967-69)
- Builder: Deutsche Werft
- Laid down: 2 October 1943
- Launched: 18 January 1944
- In service: 16 March 1944
- Out of service: July 1969
- Identification: United Kingdom Official Number 180640 (1945-59); Code Letters DOXZ (1944-45); Code Letters GMJG (1945-63)
- Fate: Scrapped

General characteristics
- Type: Cargo ship
- Tonnage: 1,923 GRT; 935 NRT; 3,800 DWT
- Length: 91.85 m (301 ft 4 in)
- Beam: 13.56 m (44 ft 6 in)
- Draught: 6.18 m (20 ft 3 in)
- Depth: 8.20 m (26 ft 11 in)
- Propulsion: Compound steam engine, single screw propeller
- Speed: 10 knots (19 km/h)
- Crew: 25, plus 8 or 10 gunners (Kattenturm)
- Notes: 1 x 30-ton, 1 x 10-ton, 10 x 5-ton derricks

Lowland was a 1,923 GRT cargo ship that was built in 1944 as Kattenturm by Deutsche Werft, Hamburg, Germany for Deutsche Dampfschiffahrts-Gesellschaft Hansa, Bremen (DDG Hansa). She was seized as a prize of war in 1945, passed to the Ministry of War Transport (MoWT) and renamed Empire Eden. In 1947, she was sold into merchant service and renamed Lowland. A sale to a Bermudan owner in 1959 saw her renamed Mary Enid. She was sold to a Greek owner in 1963 and renamed Stelianos and then Marynik following another sale in 1964. In 1967, she was sold to Hong Kong and renamed Euphipides, serving until she was scrapped in 1969.

== Description ==
The ship was built in 1944 by Deutsche Werft, Hamburg.

The ship was 91.85 m (301 ft 4 in) long, with a beam of 13.56 m (44 ft 6 in). She had a depth of 8.20 m (26 ft 11 in) and a draught of 6.18 m (20 ft 3 in). She was assessed at 1,923 GRT, 935 NRT, 3,800 DWT.

The ship was propelled by a Type LES 9 compound steam engine. The engine was built by Rheinmetall-Borsig AG, Berlin. It drove a single screw propeller and could propel the ship at 10 knots (19 km/h). The ship was equipped with a 30-ton, a 10-ton and ten 5-ton derricks.

== History ==
Kattenturm's keel was laid down on 2 October 1943. She was launched on 18 January 1944 and delivered to DDG Hansa on 16 March. The Code Letters DOXZ were allocated. She carried a crew of 25, plus eight or ten gunners. On 1 May 1945, she was seized by British forces at Brunsbüttel, Germany as a prize of war, notification of which was given on 18 March 1946. She was passed to the MoWT, which later became the Ministry of Transport. On 5 June 1945, she was delivered to Methil, Fife. Kattenturm was initially operated under the management of the China Navigation Co Ltd. She was later placed under the management of Currie Line Ltd, Leith, East Lothian. In 1946, she was renamed Empire Eden. The United Kingdom Official Number 180640 and Code Letters GMJG were allocated. Her port of registry was London. On 8 December, Empire Eden ran aground at Spurn Head, Yorkshire in a gale, but was refloated. In 1947, Empire Eden was sold to her managers and was renamed Lowland.

In 1959, Lowland was sold to the Poseidon Shipping Co, Hamilton, Bermuda and was renamed Mary Enid, remaining under the British flag. In 1963, she was sold to the Delphic Shipping Co, Piraeus, Greece and renamed Stelianos. A sale in 1964 to Marynik Compagnia Navigazione, Monrovia, Liberia saw her renamed Marynik. In 1967, she was sold to P D Marchessini (Far East) Ltd, Hong Kong and renamed Euripides. She was operated under the management of the Euripides Shipping Co, Hong Kong. She served until July 1969, when she was scrapped arrived on 8 February at Hong Kong for scrapping by Ming, Kee & Co.
