= SS Olsztyn =

German-built Hansa A Type cargo ship

History
- Name: Imkenturm (1944–45); Empire Gantry (1945–46); Feodosia (1946–47); Olsztyn (1947–72)
- Owner: DDG Hansa (1944–45); Ministry of War Transport (1945–46); Soviet Government (1946–47); Gdynia America Lines (1947–51); Polska Żegluga Morska (1951–72)
- Operator: DDG Hansa (1945); Moss Hutchinson Line (1945–46); Soviet Government (1946–47); Gdynia America Lines (1947–51); Polska Żegluga Morska (1951–72)
- Port of registry: (Nazi Germany) Bremen (1945); (United Kingdom) London (1945–46); Soviet Union (1946–47); (Poland) Gdynia (1947–51); (Poland) Szczecin (1951–72)
- Builder: Werf de Noord / Flensberger
- Yard number: 604
- Laid down: 29 March 1943
- Launched: 2 March 1944
- Completed: 27 February 1945
- Out of service: 1972
- Identification: call sign DOIJ (1945); UK official number 180638 (1945–46); call sign GJLQ (1945–46); call sign SPAH (1946–72); IMO number: 5662782 ( –1972)
- Fate: Scrapped

General characteristics
- Class & type: Hansa A type cargo ship
- Tonnage: 1,925 GRT, 936 NRT, 3,196 DWT
- Length: 87.68 m (287 ft 8 in)
- Beam: 13.51 m (44 ft 4 in)
- Draught: 5.59 m (18 ft 4 in)
- Depth: 4.80 m (15 ft 9 in)
- Installed power: Compound steam engine, 1,200IHP
- Propulsion: Single screw propeller
- Speed: 10.5 knots (19.4 km/h)
- Crew: 25, plus 8–10 gunners (in wartime)

Olsztyn was a Hansa A Type cargo ship which was built as Imkenturm in 1944 by Werf de Noord, Alblasserdam, Netherlands for DDG Hansa, Bremen, Germany. She was seized as a prize of war in 1945, passing to the Ministry of War Transport and renamed Empire Gantry. She was allocated to the Soviet Union in 1946 and was renamed Feodosia (Russian: Феодосия). Transferred to Poland in 1947, she was renamed Olsztyn. She served until 1972, when she was scrapped.

== Description ==
The ship was 87.68 m (287 ft 8 in) long, with a beam of 13.51 m (44 ft 4 in). She had a depth of 4.80 m (15 ft 9 in), and a draught of 5.59 m (18 ft 4 in). She was assessed as 1,925 GRT, 936 NRT, 3,196 DWT.

The ship was propelled by a compound steam engine, which had two cylinders of 42 cm (16 9/16 in) and two cylinders of 90 cm (35 7/16 in) diameter by 90 cm (35 7/16 in) inches stroke. The engine was built by Rheinmetall-Börsig AG, Tegel, Germany. Rated at 1,200IHP, it drove a single screw propeller and could propel the ship at 10.5 knots (19.4 km/h).

The ship had a complement of 25, plus 8-10 gunners during wartime. She was equipped with 1×30-tonne, 1×10-tonne and 10×5-tonne cranes.

== History ==
Imkenturm was a Hansa A Type cargo ship built in 1944 as yard number 604 by Werf de Noord, Alblasserdam, Netherlands for Deutsche Dampfschifffarts-Gesellschaft Hansa, Bremen, Germany. Her keel was laid on 29 March 1943. She was launched on 2 March 1944 and completed by Flensburger Schiffbau-Gesellschaft, Flensburg, Germany on 27 February 1945. Her port of registry was Bremen, and the Code Letters DOIJ were allocated. She participated in the Evacuation of East Prussia and was damaged in an Allied air raid on Flensburg on 1 May 1945.

On 8 May 1945, Imkenturm was seized as a prize of war at Flensburg. She was passed to the Ministry of War Transport and was renamed Empire Gantry. Her UK official number was 180638 and her call sign was GJLQ. She was registered in London and Moss Hutchinson Line Ltd managed her.

In 1946 Empire Gantry was allocated to the Soviet Union and renamed Feodosia.

In 1947, Feodosia was transferred to Gdynia America Lines, Poland and was renamed Olsztyn. The Code Letters SPAH were allocated. In 1951, she was sold to Polska Żegluga Morska, Szczecin. With their introduction in the 1960s, Olsztyn was allocated the IMO Number 5662782. She served until 1972, arriving at Bruges, Belgium on 31 January for scrapping by Gebroeders Van Heygen.
