= Project AGILE =

1960s US asymmetric warfare project for Southeast Asia

Project Agile was an Advanced Research Projects Agency (ARPA) project in the 1960s that investigated means for engaging in remote, limited asymmetric warfare. The research was intended for use in providing U.S. support to countries engaged in fighting Communist insurgents, particularly in South Vietnam and Thailand.

== History ==
Project Agile was directed by the United States Department of Defense Advanced Research Projects Administration (ARPA) and ran from mid 1961 through 1974, when it was canceled. The project was charged with developing methods to use in the Vietnam War and also provided information for use by Thailand in counterinsurgency action against Communist insurgents.

== Coverage ==
Project Agile covered a wide range of topics related to warfare under various conditions present in the Far East, from electronic surveillance, used to interdict Communist convoys in the Ho Chi Minh trail, to sociological research on troops likely to be subverted by Communist rebels. It was broken down into a number of subprojects.

=== Subproject I, II, and VIII ===
Subprojects II and VIII were merged into Subproject I, and the resulting subproject covered weapons, individual equipment, and rations. Individual weapons included the M16 assault rifle, special purpose shotguns for use as insurgency weapons, flamethrowers, and rifle grenades. Crew served weapons included cupolas for armored personnel carriers, quad-mount machine guns, squeeze bore .50 to .30 in (12.7 to 7.6 mm) caliber guns, multiple shot grenade launchers, lightweight mortars, and the Stoner 63 weapons system.

=== Subproject III ===
Subproject III covered remote area mobility and logistics. Included were studies of air and land transport, amphibious and water transport, STOL aircraft, and remote airstrips.

=== Subproject IV ===
Subproject IV covered communications systems. Both technical and procedural aspects of radio communications were studied, as well as power supplies and antennas.

=== Subproject V ===
Subproject V covered combat surveillance and target acquisition. Included were studies of airborne systems, such as infrared, radar, light amplification and spectral zone photography. Also included were surface/land systems such as night vision, personal Doppler radar, target illumination, metal and cavity detectors, security and navigation systems.

=== Subproject VI ===
Subproject VI covered "individual and special projects", which included use of herbicides (such as Agent Orange), psychological warfare, and medical research and equipment. The use of herbicides was largely inspired by the British use of 2,4-D and 2,4,5-T (a mixture designated "Agent Orange" by the U.S.) to destroy jungle-grown crops during the Malayan Emergency in the 1950s.

==== OCONUS and CONUS Test Programs ====
Part of Project Agile was Subproject VI and Outside the Contiguous US (OCONUS). The Defoliation Test Program was sponsored by the Advanced Research Projects Agency (ARPA) under ARPA Order 423. One test program was conducted by the United States Army Biological Center, based at Fort Detrick, Maryland, in Thailand from 1964 to 1965 to determine the effectiveness of aerial applications of Purple, Orange, and other candidate chemical agents in defoliation of upland jungle vegetation representative of Southeast Asia. Data provided by these techniques were used in comparative evaluation of defoliant chemicals in relation to rate, volume, season of application, canopy penetration, and vegetation response.

There have been recurring allegations that similar tests have been conducted in Okinawa, Japan. The Japan Times and The Okinawa Times have both published accounts from an unnamed official claiming that The Pentagon had tested defoliants in the island’s northern jungles near Kunigami and Higashi village. Other corroborating evidence is that in 1962, the U.S. Army counterinsurgency school in Vietnam moved to Okinawa. The USNS Schuyler Otis Bland was known to have brought highly classified "agriculture products" under armed guard to Southeast Asia, Okinawa, and Panama. The ship's logbook was found by Michelle Gatz and shows the ship was carrying classified cargo that was offloaded under armed guard at White Beach, a U.S. Navy port on Okinawa's east coast, on April 25, 1962. After departing Okinawa in the Spring of 1962, the O.S. Bland sailed to the Panama Canal Zone where, the Panamanian government asserts, the U.S. tested herbicides in the early 1960s. In June 2013, the US Department of Defense (DoD) rejected the allegations that Agent Orange was present in Okinawa, saying it had no factual basis. For example, according to the DoD report, the S.O. Bland was loaded with Agent Pink and Agent Purple, which it off loaded to Vietnam on 16–18 January 1962 before it stopped at Okinawa on 31 January 1962 on its way back.

The late author Sheldon H. Harris in his book Factories of Death: Japanese Biological Warfare, 1932—1945, and the American Cover-up wrote that field tests for wheat rust and rice blast were conducted throughout 1961 in Okinawa and at "several sites in the midwest and south", although these were probably part of Project 112. Harris attributes the rapid expansion of the US defoliant programs to these early successes.

=== Subproject VII ===
Subproject VII covered technical planning and programming, including research into morbidity and casualties, environmental issues, and various tactical studies, both of Viet Cong operations and other instances of asymmetric warfare such as conflicts in Algeria and Latin America.
