= Agent Purple =

Herbicide and defoliant

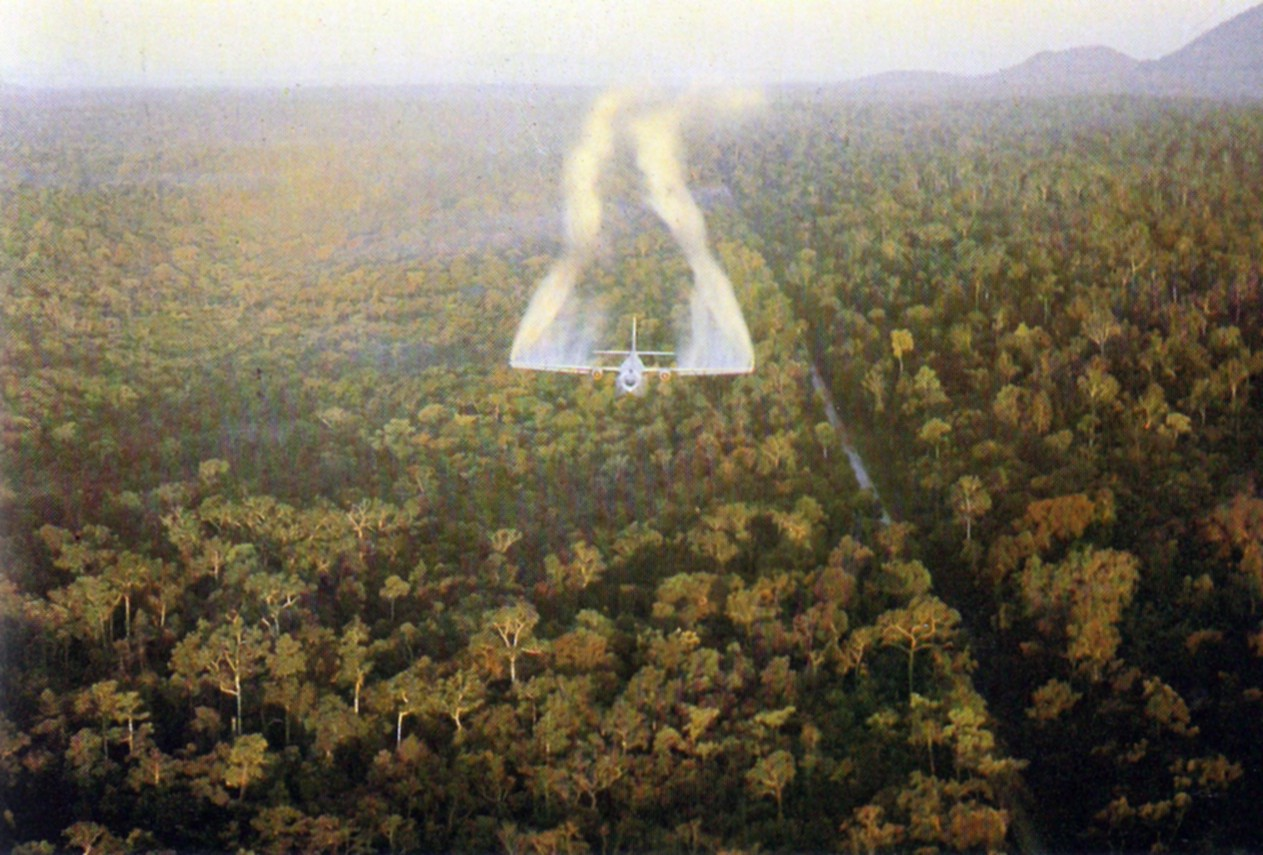
Ranch Hand UC-123B spraying defoliant in 1962

Agent Purple is the code name for a powerful herbicide and defoliant used by the U.S. military in their herbicidal warfare program during the Vietnam War. The name comes from the purple stripe painted on the barrels to identify the contents. Largely inspired by the British use of herbicides and defoliants during the Malayan Emergency, it was one of the so-called "Rainbow Herbicides" that included the more infamous Agent Orange. Agent Purple and Orange were also used to clear brush in Canada.

Agent Purple was chemically similar to the better-known Agent Orange, both of them were consisting of a mixture of the herbicides 2,4-D and 2,4,5-T and in both cases the 2,4-D and 2,4,5-T constituted equal shares of the Agent. The difference was in the form of 2,4,5-T. While all the 2,4,5-T in Agent Orange was as the n-butyl ester, the 2,4,5-T in Agent Purple was itself mixture of n-butyl and isobutyl ester forms (60%:40% respectively). The Agent Purple had then the following composition: 50% 2,4-D n-butyl ester, 30% 2,4,5-T n-butyl ester, and 20% 2,4,5-T isobutyl ester.

Chemical structures of Agent Purple components

2,4-D n-butyl ester

2,4,5-T n-butyl ester

2,4,5-T iso-butyl ester

Even prior to Operation Ranch Hand (1962-1971) it was known that 2,4,5-T, and thus Agent Purple, Agent Pink, Agent Green, and Agent Orange, were contaminated with tetrachlorodibenzodioxin (TCDD), an extremely toxic and persistent by-product formed during synthesis. Dioxin-levels varied considerably from batch to batch, and even within the same batch; generally, agents produced earlier, such as Agent Purple and Agent Pink suffered from higher levels of contamination. A 2003 Nature paper by Stellman et al., which re-apprised the average TCDD content of Agent Orange from the 3 ppm that USAF had reported to a level of 13 ppm, also estimated that Agent Purple may have had 32.8 ppm of TCDD on average. A sample of Agent Purple archived at Eglin Air Force Base had an even higher content of 45 ppm TCDD.

Agent Purple was used only in the earliest stages of the spraying program, between 1962 and 1965 as well as in earlier tests conducted by the US military outside of Vietnam. About 500,000 U.S. gal (1,900,000 L; 420,000 imp gal) were sprayed in Vietnam in total. When the need to clear brush around CFB Gagetown in Canada arose, quantities of Agent Purple and Agent Orange were also sprayed there in a testing program during 1966 and 1967.
