= Rainbow Herbicides =

Herbicides used by the US in the Vietnam War

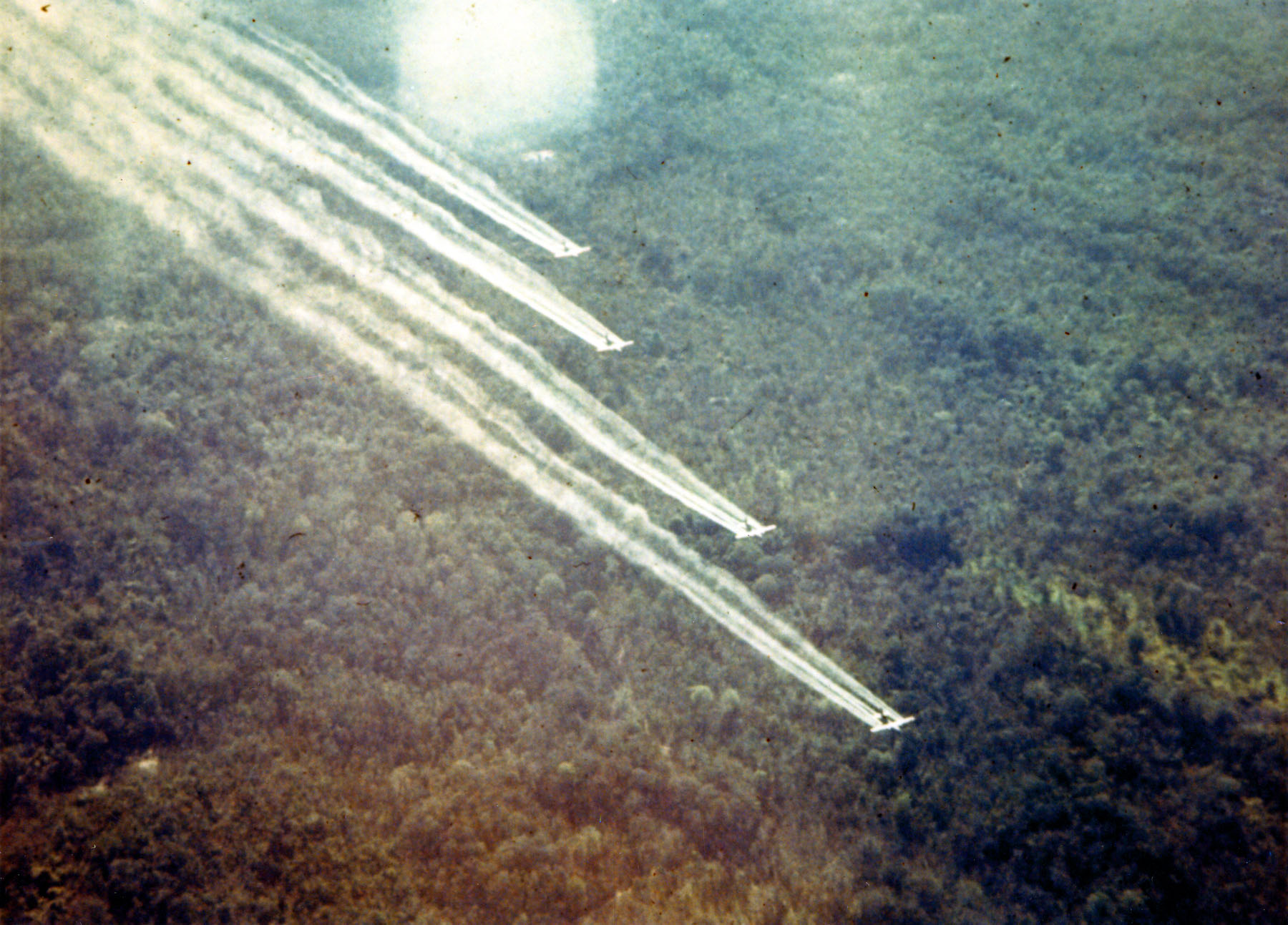
Four USAF C-123s spraying Rainbow Herbicide over South Vietnam as part of Operation Ranch Hand

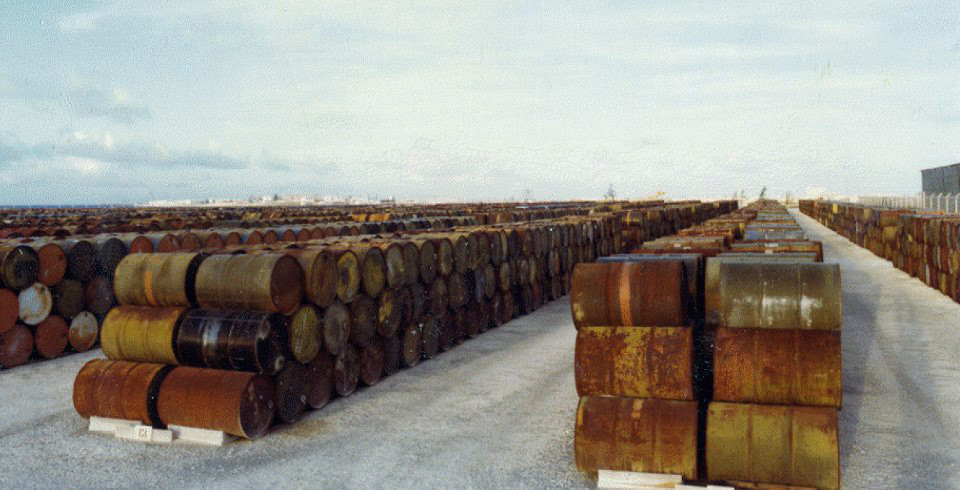
Agent Orange stored at Johnston Atoll in 1976, following the end of US involvement in Vietnam

The Rainbow Herbicides are a group of tactical-use herbicides used by the United States military in Southeast Asia during the Vietnam War. Success with Project AGILE field tests in 1961 with herbicides in South Vietnam was inspired by the British use of herbicides and defoliants during the Malayan Emergency in the 1950s, which led to the formal herbicidal program Trail Dust (see Operation Ranch Hand). Herbicidal warfare is the use of substances primarily designed to destroy the plant-based ecosystem of an agricultural food production area and/or to destroy dense foliage which provides the enemy with natural tactical cover. Under the Organisation for the Prohibition of Chemical Weapons (OPCW) definition, toxic agents such as rainbow herbicides are not considered chemical weapons as they are not used to cause intentional death or harm to humans through their toxic properties.

== Background ==
The United States discovered 2,4-dichlorophenoxyacetic acid (2,4-D) during World War II. It was recognized as toxic and was combined with large amounts of water or oil to function as a weed-killer. Army experiments with the chemical eventually led to the discovery that 2,4-D combined with 2,4,5-trichlorophenoxyacetic acid (2,4,5-T) yielded a more potent herbicide. Some batches of 2,4,5-T manufactured for Rainbow Herbicide use were later found to have been contaminated with synthesis-byproduct dioxins including 2,3,7,8-tetrachlorodibenzodioxin (TCDD). Work by researcher Alvin Lee Young identifies examples of Agent Pink and Agent Green containing as much as double the TCDD concentrations observed in Agent Purple or Agent Orange.

== Types ==
This is a list of the different types of agents used, their active ingredients, and the years they were being used during the Vietnam War as follows:

Name	Content	used
Agent Green	100% n-butyl ester 2,4,5-T	prior to 1963
Agent Pink	100% 2,4,5-T (60% n-butyl ester 2,4,5-T, and 40% iso-butyl ester of 2,4,5-T)	prior to 1964
Agent Purple	50% 2,4,5-T (30% n-butyl ester of 2,4,5-T, and 20% iso-butyl ester of 2,4,5-T) and 50% n-butyl ester of 2,4-D	1961–1965
Agent Blue (Phytar 560G)	65.6% organic arsenicical (cacodylic acid (Ansar 138) and its sodium salt sodium cacodylate)	1962–1971
Agent White (Tordon 101)	21.2% (acid weight basis) triisopropanolamine salts of 2,4-D and 5.7% picloram	1966–1971
Agent Orange Herbicide Orange (HO)	50% n-butyl ester 2,4-D and 50% n-butyl ester 2,4,5-T	1965–1970
Agent Orange II	50% n-butyl ester 2,4-D and 50% isooctyl ester 2,4,5-T	after 1968
Agent Orange III	66.6% n-butyl 2,4-D and 33.3% n-butyl ester 2,4,5-T.	
Enhanced Agent Orange, Orange Plus, Super Orange (SO), or Dow Herbicide M-3393	Standardized Agent Orange mixture of 2,4-D and 2,4,5-T combined with an oil-based mixture of picloram, a proprietary Dow Chemical Company product called Tordon 101, an ingredient of Agent White.	

== Use ==
In Vietnam, the early large-scale defoliation missions (1962–1964) used 8,208 U.S. gal (31,070 L; 6,835 imp gal) of Agent Green, 122,792 U.S. gal (464,820 L; 102,246 imp gal) of Agent Pink, and 14,500 U.S. gal (55,000 L; 12,100 imp gal) of Agent Purple. These were dwarfed by the 11,712,860 U.S. gal (44,338,000 L; 9,753,000 imp gal) of Agent Orange (both versions) used from 1965 to 1970. Agent White started to replace Orange in 1966; 145,239,853 U.S. gal (549,792,650 L; 120,937,476 imp gal) of White were used. The only agent used on a large scale in an anti-crop role was Agent Blue, with 142,166,656 U.S. gal (538,159,330 L; 118,378,504 imp gal) used. The bombardment occurred most heavily in the area of the Ho Chi Minh Trail.

The rainbow herbicides damaged the ecosystems and cultivated lands of Vietnam, and led to the buildup of dioxins in the regional food chain. About 4.8 million people were affected. The environmental destruction caused by this defoliation has been described by Swedish Prime Minister Olof Palme, lawyers, historians and other academics as an ecocide.

In addition to testing and using the herbicides in Vietnam, Laos, and Cambodia, the US military also tested the "Rainbow Herbicides" and many other chemical defoliants and herbicides in the United States, Canada, Puerto Rico, Korea, India, and Thailand from the mid-1940s to the late 1960s. Herbicide persistence studies of Agent Orange and Agent White were conducted in the Philippines. The Philippine herbicide test program was conducted in cooperation with the University of the Philippines College of Forestry, and was also described in a 1969 issue of The Philippine Collegian, the college's newspaper. Super or enhanced Agent Orange was tested by representatives from Fort Detrick and Dow Chemical in Texas, Puerto Rico, Hawaii, and later in Malaysia, in a cooperative project with the International Rubber Research Institute. Picloram in Agent White and Super-Orange was contaminated by hexachlorobenzene (HCB). The Canadian government also tested these herbicides and used them to clear vegetation for artillery training.

A 2003 study in Nature found that the military underreported its use of rainbow herbicides by 2,493,792 U.S. gal (9,440,030 L; 2,076,516 imp gal).

== Long-term effects ==
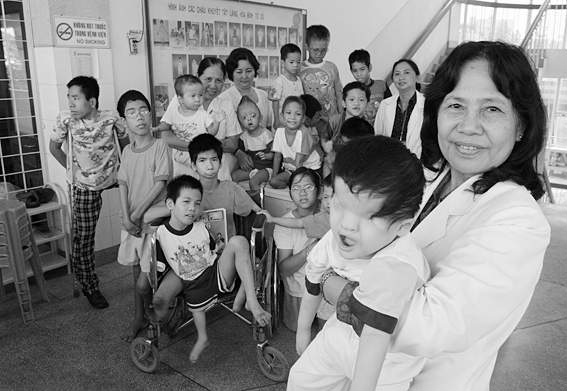
Professor Nguyen Thi Ngoc Phuong, at Từ Dũ Obstetrics and Gynecology Hospital is pictured with a group of disabled children in 2004.

Vietnam remains heavily contaminated by dioxin-like compounds, which are classified as persistent organic pollutants. These compounds remain in the water table and have built up in the tissues of local fauna. However, the contamination has begun to deteriorate, and the forest canopy has regrown somewhat since the Vietnam War.

Dioxins are endocrine disruptors and may have effects on the children of people who were exposed.

Rainbow herbicides and other dioxin-like compounds are endocrine disruptors, and evidence suggests that they continue to have long-term health consequences many years after exposure. Because they mimic, or interfere with, hormonal function, adverse effects can include problems with reproduction, growth and development, immune function, and metabolic function. As an example, dioxins and dioxin-like compounds influence the hormone dehydroepiandrosterone (DHEA), which has a role in the determination of male or female sex characteristics. There have been thousands of documented instances of health problems and birth defects associated with rainbow herbicide exposure in Vietnam, where tested levels remain high in the soil, water, and atmosphere, decades after initial exposure.

Soldiers exposed to Rainbow Herbicides in Southeast Asia reported long-term health effects, which led to several lawsuits against the U.S. government and the manufacturers of the chemical.

It's also important to note that these agents were used domestically and in other foreign locations for varius reasons, othe than just Southeast Asia. For example Fort Ord California, a US Army base that was closed down in a base realignment, was the subject of an EPS Superfund cleanup due to leaking storage and use of some of these agents. Once the base was determined to be used for private purpose, the toxins were discovered in ground water.

== See also ==
- U.S. Army Biological Warfare Laboratories
