= Operation Ranch Hand =

1962–1971 US herbicidal warfare operation in the Vietnam War

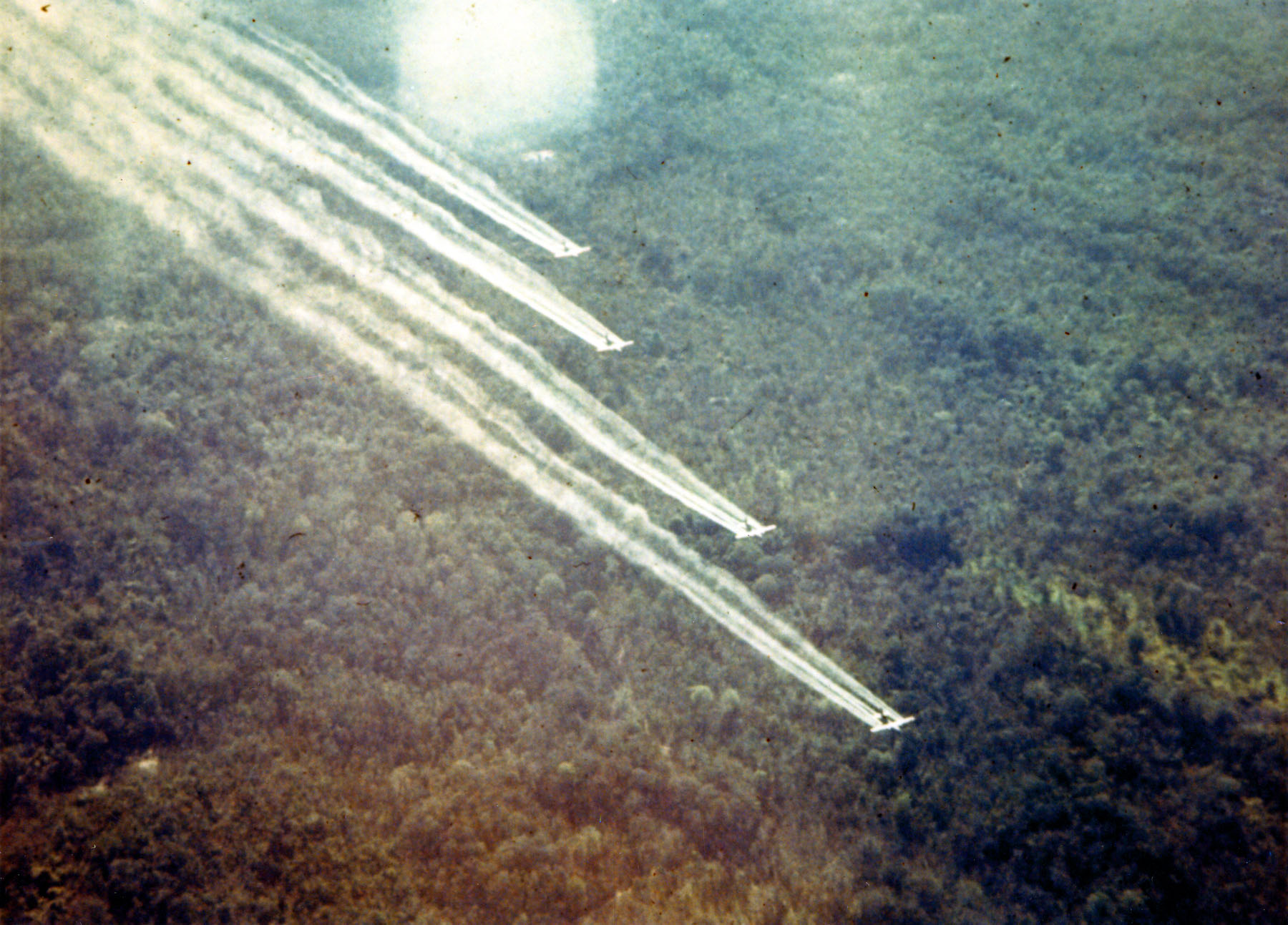
Four-plane defoliant run, part of Operation Ranch Hand

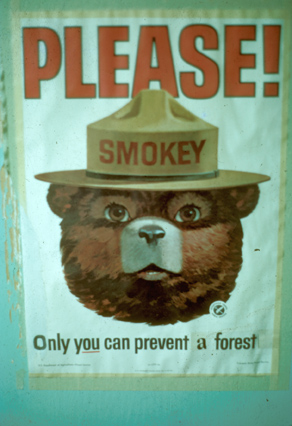
"Smokey Bear" parody

Operation Ranch Hand was a U.S. military operation during the Vietnam War, lasting from 1962 until 1971. Largely inspired by the British use of chemicals 2,4,5-T and 2,4-D (Agent Orange) during the Malayan Emergency in the 1950s, it was part of the overall herbicidal warfare program during the war called "Operation Trail Dust". Ranch Hand involved spraying an estimated 19 million U.S. gallons (72,000 m^{3}) of defoliants and herbicides over rural areas of South Vietnam in an attempt to deprive the Viet Cong of food and vegetation cover. Areas of Laos and Cambodia were also sprayed to a lesser extent. According to the Vietnamese government, the chemicals have killed or maimed 400,000 people. The United States government has described these figures as "unreliable".

Nearly 20,000 sorties were flown between 1961 and 1971. The "Ranch Handers" motto was "Only you can prevent a forest" – a take on the popular U.S. Forest Service poster slogan of Smokey Bear. During the ten years of spraying, over 5 million acres (20,000 km^{2}) of forest and 500,000 acres (2,000 km^{2}) of crops were heavily damaged or destroyed. Around 20% of the forests of South Vietnam were sprayed at least once.

The herbicides were sprayed by the U.S. Air Force flying C-123s using the call sign "Hades". The planes were fitted with specially developed spray tanks with a capacity of 1,000 U.S. gallons (4 m^{3}) of herbicides. A plane sprayed a swath of land that was 80 m (260 ft) wide and 16 km (9.9 mi) long in about 4½ minutes, at a rate of about 3 U.S. gallons per acre (3 m^{3}/km^{2}). Sorties usually consisted of three to five aircraft flying side by side. 95% of the herbicides and defoliants used in the war were sprayed by the U.S. Air Force as part of Operation Ranch Hand. The remaining 5% were sprayed by the U.S. Chemical Corps, other military branches, and the Republic of Vietnam using hand sprayers, spray trucks, helicopters and boats, primarily around U.S. military installations.

== Defoliants ==
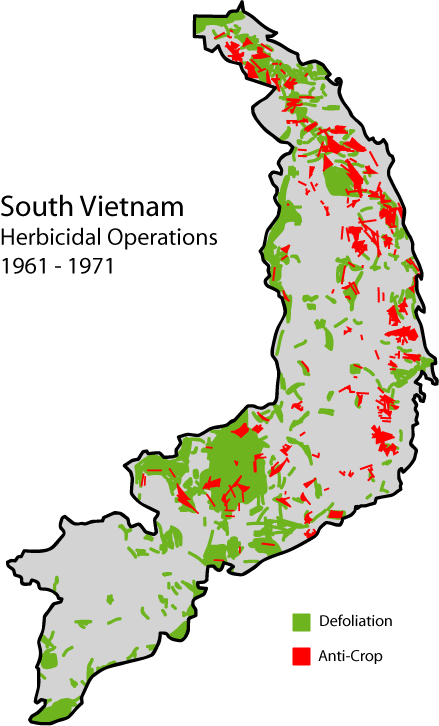
Map of herbicide usage during the Vietnam war.

The herbicides used were sprayed at up to 50 times the normal concentration for agricultural use. The most common herbicide used was Herbicide Orange, more commonly referred to as Agent Orange: a fifty-fifty mixture of two herbicides, 2,4-D (2,4-dichlorophenoxyacetic acid) and 2,4,5-T (2,4,5-trichlorophenoxyacetic acid), manufactured for the U.S. Department of Defense primarily by Monsanto Corporation and Dow Chemical. The other most common color-coded Ranch Hand herbicides were Agent Blue (cacodylic acid) that was primarily used against food crops, and Agent White which was often used when Agent Orange was not available.

The Agents used are known as the Rainbow Herbicides with their active ingredients, and the periods used were as follows:

- Agent Green: 100% n-butyl ester 2,4,5-T, used prior to 1966
- Agent Pink: 100% 2,4,5-T (60% n-butyl ester 2,4,5-T, and 40% iso-butyl ester of 2,4,5-T) used prior to 1966
- Agent Purple: 50% 2,4,5-T (30% n-butyl ester of 2,4,5-T, and 20% iso-butyl ester of 2,4,5-T) and 50% n-butyl ester of 2,4-D used 1961–1965
- Agent Blue (Phytar 560G): 65.6% organic Arsenicical (cacodylic acid (Ansar 138) and its sodium salt sodium cacodylate) used from 1962–1971 in powder and water solution
- Agent White (Tordon 101): 21.2% (acid weight basis) triisopropanolamine salts of 2,4-D and 5.7% picloram used 1966–1971
- Agent Orange or Herbicide Orange, (HO): 50% n-butyl ester 2,4-D and 50% n-butyl ester 2,4,5-T used 1965–1970
- Agent Orange II:50% n-butyl ester 2,4-D and 50% isooctyl ester 2,4,5-T used after 1968.
- Agent Orange III: 66.6% n-butyl 2,4-D and 33.3% n-butyl ester 2,4,5-T.
- Enhanced Agent Orange, Orange Plus, Super Orange (SO), or DOW Herbicide M-3393: standardized Agent Orange mixture of 2,4-D and 2,4,5-T combined with an oil-based mixture of picloram, a proprietary Dow Chemical product called Tordon 101, an ingredient of Agent White.

The herbicides were procured by the U.S. military from Dow Chemical Company (all but Agent Blue), Monsanto (Agent Orange, Agent Purple, and Agent Pink), Hercules Inc. (Agent Orange and Agent Purple), Thompson-Hayward Chemical Company (Agent Orange and Agent Pink), Diamond Alkali/Shamrock Company (Agent Orange, Agent Blue, Agent Purple, and Agent Pink), United States Rubber Company (Agent Orange), Thompson Chemicals Corporation (Agent Orange and Agent Pink), Agrisect Company (Agent Orange and Agent Purple), Hoffman-Taff Inc. (Agent Orange), and the Ansul Chemical Company (Agent Blue). In April 1967, the entire American domestic production of 2,4,5-T was confiscated by the military; foreign sources were also tapped into, including Imperial Chemical Industries (ICI).

Sixty-five percent of the herbicides used contained 2,4,5-trichlorophenoxyacetic acid that was contaminated with 2,3,7,8-tetrachlorodibenzodioxin, a "known human carcinogen... by several different routes of exposure, including oral, dermal, and intraperitoneal". About 12,000,000 U.S. gal (45,000,000 L; 10,000,000 imp gal) of dioxin-contaminated herbicides were sprayed over Southeast Asia (mainly in Vietnam, Cambodia, and Laos) during American combat operations in the Vietnam War.

In 2005, a New Zealand government minister was quoted and widely reported as saying that Agent Orange chemicals had been supplied from New Zealand to the United States military during the conflict. Shortly after, the same minister claimed to have been misquoted, although this point was less widely reported. From 1962 to 1987, 2,4,5-T herbicide had been manufactured at an Ivon Watkins-Dow plant in New Plymouth for domestic use, however it has not been proven that the herbicide had been exported for use by the U.S military in Vietnam.

== Operations ==
For most of the war, Operation Ranch Hand was based at Bien Hoa Air Base (1966–1970), for operations in the Mekong Delta region where U.S. Navy patrol boats were vulnerable to attack from areas of undergrowth along the water's edge. Storage, mixing, loading, and washing areas and a parking ramp were located just off the base's inside taxiway between the Hot Cargo Ramp and the control tower. For operations along the central coast and the Ho Chi Minh trail regions, Ranch Hand operated out of Da Nang Air Base (1964–1971). Other bases of operation included Phù Cát Air Base (1968–1970), Tan Son Nhut Air Base (1962–1966), Nha Trang Air Base (1968–69), Phan Rang Air Base (1970–1972), and Tuy Hoa Air Base (1971–1972). Other bases were also used as temporary staging areas for Ranch Hand. The Da Nang, Bien Hoa and Phu Cat Air bases are still heavily contaminated with dioxin from the herbicides, and have been placed on a priority list for containment and clean-up by the Vietnamese government.

The first aerial spraying of herbicides was a test run conducted on 10 August 1961 in a village north of Đắk Tô against foliage. Testing continued into the next year and even though there was doubt in the State Department, the Pentagon and the White House as to the efficacy of the herbicides, Operation Ranch Hand began in early 1962. Individual spray runs had to be approved by President John F. Kennedy until November 1962, when Kennedy gave the authority to approve most spray runs to the Military Assistance Command, Vietnam and the U.S. Ambassador to South Vietnam. Ranch Hand was given final approval to spray targets in eastern Laos in December 1965.

The issue of whether or not to allow crop destruction was under great debate due to its potential of violating the Geneva Protocol. However, American officials pointed out that the British had previously used 2,4,5-T and 2,4-D (virtually identical to America's use in Vietnam) on a large scale throughout the Malayan Emergency in the 1950s in order to destroy bushes, crops, and trees in an effort to deny communist insurgents the cover they needed to ambush passing convoys. Indeed, Secretary of State Dean Rusk told President Kennedy on 24 November 1961, that "[t]he use of defoliant does not violate any rule of international law concerning the conduct of chemical warfare and is an accepted tactic of war. Precedent has been established by the British during the emergency in Malaya in their use of aircraft for destroying crops by chemical spraying." The president of South Vietnam, Ngo Dinh Diem, began to push the U.S. Military Advisory Group in Vietnam and the White House to begin crop destruction in September 1961, but it was not until October 1962 when the White House gave approval for limited testing of Agent Blue against crops in an area believed to be controlled by the Viet Cong. Soon after, crop destruction became an integral part of the Ranch Hand program.

Targets for the spray runs were carefully selected to satisfy the strategic and psychological operations goals of the U.S. and South Vietnamese military. Spray runs were surveyed to pinpoint the target area and then placed on a priority list. Due to the low altitude (ideally 150 ft (46 m) required for spraying, the C-123s were escorted by fighter aircraft or helicopter gunships that would strafe or bomb the target area in order to draw out any ground fire if the area was believed to be 'hot'. Spray runs were planned to enable as straight a run as possible to limit the amount of time the planes flew at low altitude. Data on the spray runs, their targets, the herbicide used and amount used, weather conditions and other details were recorded and later put into a database called the Herbicide Reporting System (HERBS) tapes.

The effectiveness of the spraying was influenced by many factors including weather and terrain. Spray runs occurred during the early morning hours before temperatures rose above 85 °F (29 °C) and the winds picked up. Mangroves in the Delta region required only one spraying and did not survive once defoliated, whereas dense forests in the uplands required two or more spray runs. Within two to three weeks of spraying, the leaves would drop from the trees, which would remain bare until the next rainy season. In order to defoliate the lower stories of forest cover, one or more follow-up spray runs were needed. About 10 percent of the trees sprayed died from a single spray run. Multiple spraying resulted in increased mortality for the trees, as did following up the herbicide missions with napalm or bombing strikes.

== Scientific community reaction ==
The use of herbicides in the Vietnam War was controversial from the beginning, particularly for crop destruction. The scientific community began to protest the use of herbicides in Vietnam as early as 1964, when the Federation of American Scientists objected to the use of defoliants. The American Association for the Advancement of Science (AAAS) issued a resolution in 1966 calling for a field investigation of the herbicide program in Vietnam. In 1967, seventeen Nobel laureates and 5,000 other scientists signed a petition asking for the immediate end to the use of herbicides in Vietnam.

In 1970, AAAS sent a team of scientists—the Herbicide Assessment Commission (HAC), consisting of Matthew Meselson, Arthur Westing, John Constable, and Robert Cook—to conduct field tests of the ecological impacts of the herbicide program in Vietnam. A 1969 study by the Bionetics Research Laboratory found that 2,4,5-T could cause birth defects and stillbirths in mice. The U.S. government suspended the military use of 2,4,5-T in the U.S. in April 1970. Sporadic crop destruction sorties using Agent Blue and Agent White continued throughout 1970 until the final Ranch Hand run was flown on 7 January 1971.

== Human impact ==
The use of herbicides as a defoliant had long-term destructive effects on the people of Vietnam and their land and ecology, as well as on those who fled in the mass exodus from 1978 to the early 1990s. According to the Vietnamese government, the US program exposed approximately 4.8 million Vietnamese people to Agent Orange, resulting in 400,000 deaths or permanent injuries due to a range of cancers and other ailments.

Hindsight corrective studies indicate that previous estimates of Agent Orange exposure were biased by government intervention and under-guessing, such that current estimates for dioxin release are almost double those previously predicted. According to the Vietnamese Government, census data indicates that the United States military directly sprayed upon millions of Vietnamese during strategic Agent Orange use.

According to the Vietnamese government, the program caused three million Vietnamese health problems, with 150,000 children born with severe birth defects, and 24% of the area of Vietnam being defoliated. The Red Cross of Vietnam estimates that up to one million people were disabled or have health problems as a result of exposure to Agent Orange. The United States government has described these figures as "unreliable". According to the Department of Veteran Affairs, 2.6 million U.S. military personnel were exposed and hundreds of thousands of veterans are eligible for treatment for Agent Orange-related illnesses.

== See also ==
- Aerial herbicide application in the War on Drugs
- Environmental issues in Vietnam
- Impact of Agent Orange in Vietnam
- Operation Pacer HO, destruction of remaining stocks from Johnston Atoll in 1977
- Scorched earth
