= Agent Green =

Vietnam war-era herbicides

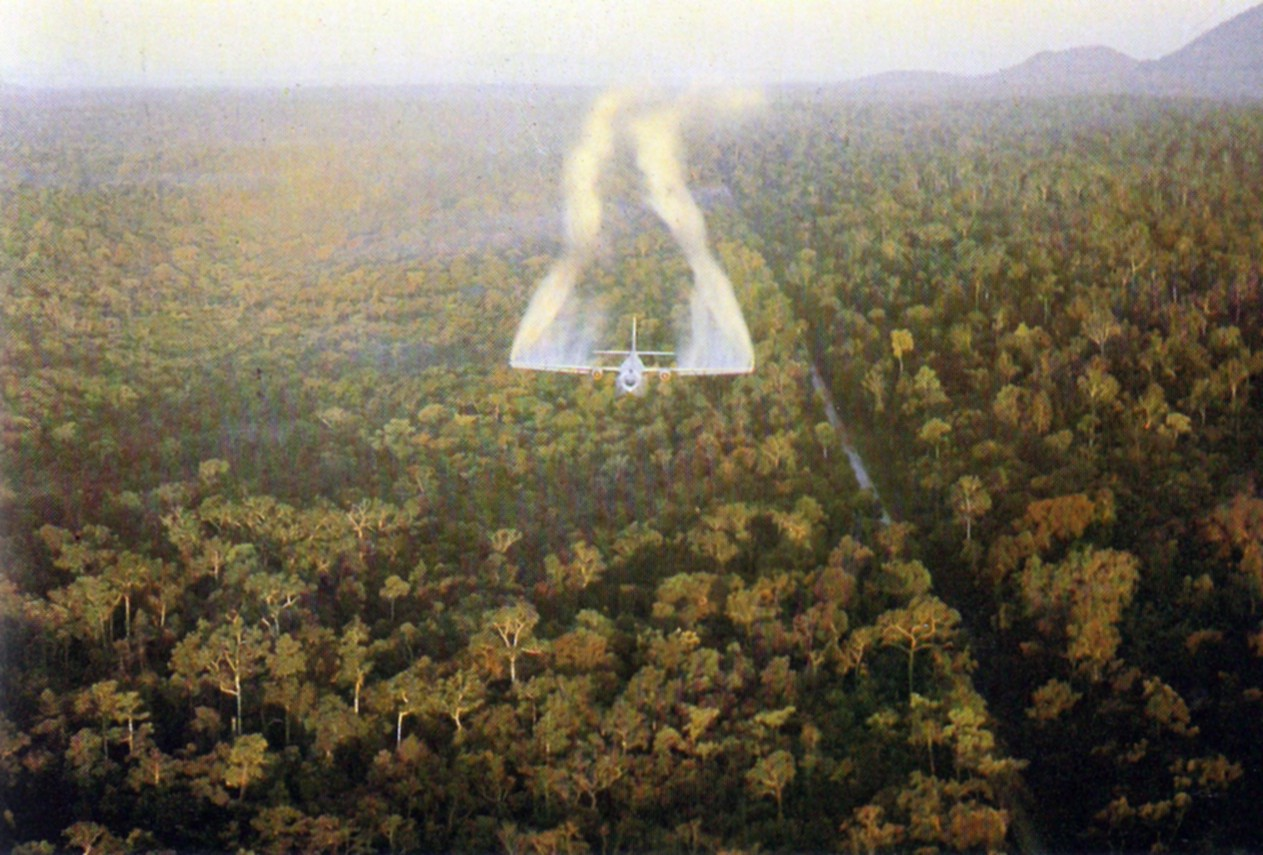
Ranch Hand UC-123B spraying defoliant in 1962

Agent Green is the code name for a powerful herbicide and defoliant used by the U.S. military in its herbicidal warfare program during the Vietnam War. The name comes from the green stripe painted on the barrels to identify the contents. Largely inspired by the British use of herbicides and defoliants during the Malayan Emergency, it was one of the so-called "Rainbow Herbicides". Agent Green was only used between 1962 and 1964, during the early "testing" stages of the spraying program.

Agent Green was mixed with Agent Pink and used for crop destruction. A total of 20,000 gallons of Agent Green were procured.

Agent Green's only active ingredient was 2,4,5-trichlorophenoxyacetic acid (2,4,5-T), one of the common phenoxy herbicides of the era. Even prior to Operation Ranch Hand (1962-1971) it was known that a dioxin, 2,3,7,8-tetrachlorodibenzo-para-dioxin (TCDD), is produced as a side product of the manufacture of 2,4,5-T, and was thus present in any of the herbicides that used it. Because Agent Green's only active ingredient was 2,4,5-T, along with the similar Agent Pink, and earlier-produced batches of 2,4,5-T having higher TCDD-levels, it contained many times the average level of dioxin found in Agent Orange.

During much of the fighting in the Vietnam War, chemical agents were used by the United States to defoliate the landscape. Although many different chemical agents were used, the most well known today is "Agent Orange," one of the "Rainbow Herbicides."
