= Gagetown (film) =

- Directed by: Daniel Feighery
- Produced by: Gregg de Domenico, Jillian Stricker
- Cinematography: Gregg de Domenico
- Edited by: Gerald Zecker, Jr.
- Music by: Zain Effendi
- Release date: September 2009
- Running time: 90 minutes
- Country: United States
- Language: English

Gagetown is a 2009 documentary film that looks into the massive defoliant spray program that was used at CFB Gagetown since 1956. The chemical herbicides used include 50/50 mixtures of 2,4-D/ 2,4,5-T, and Tordon 101, also known as Agent Orange and Agent White.

These chemicals have been known to produce extremely toxic byproducts, including dioxins and hexachlorobenzenes.

Exposure to these byproducts has been linked to increased cases in cancer and blood diseases, especially non-Hodgkin lymphoma and leukemia.

According to a Canadian Department of National Defence document acquired through the Access to Information Act, over 3.2 million liters and kilograms of chemical defoliants were used at the base between the years 1956 to 1984.

== Press ==
- Article by Shawn Berry, The Daily Gleaner, March 9, 2009
- Article by Benjamin Shingler, Telegraph Journal, March 28, 2009
- Article by Kate Horodyski, Capital News Online, April 3, 2009
