= Agent Blue =

Type of herbicide used in the Vietnam War

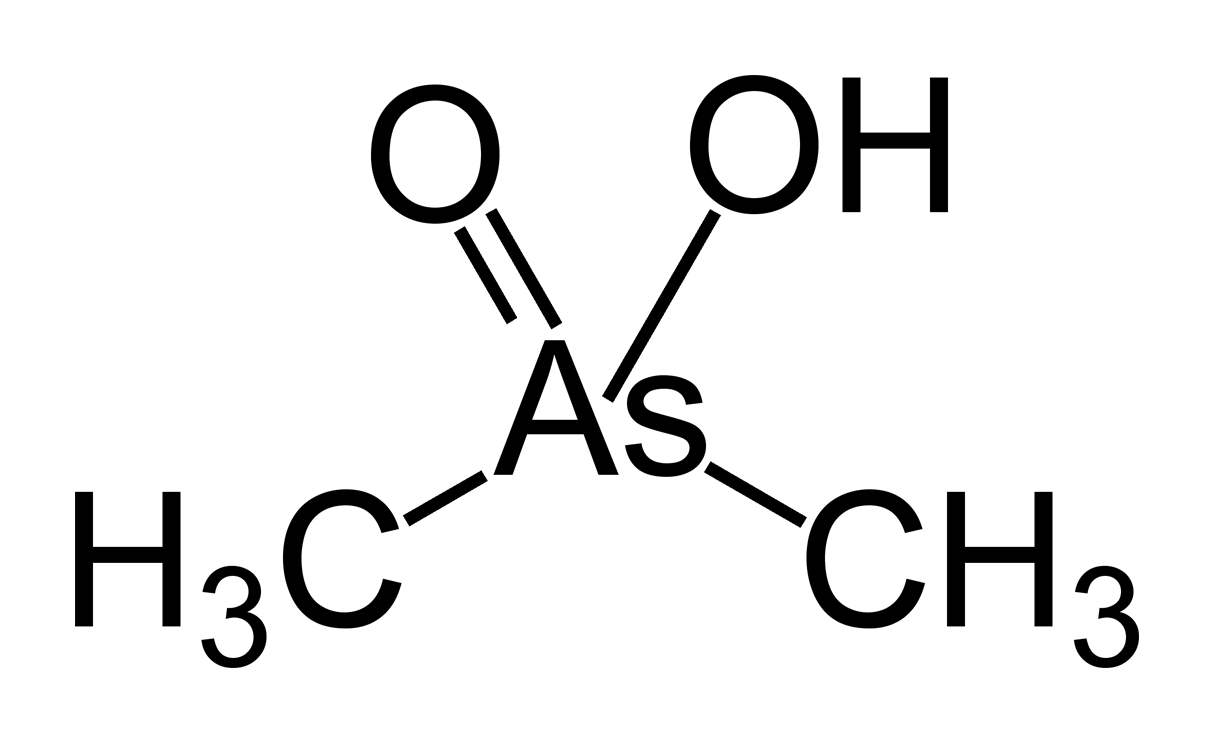
Cacodylic acid (and sodium cacodylate) are components of Agent Blue

Agent Blue is one of the "rainbow herbicides" that is known for use by the United States during the Vietnam War. It contained a mixture of dimethylarsinic acid (also known as cacodylic acid) and its related salt, sodium cacodylate, and water. In contrast to the better-known members like Agent Orange or Agent White, Agent Blue was mostly targeted at killing rice, a hardy crop that was highly resistant to the other rainbow herbicides. Unlike the other "rainbow herbicides", Agent Blue was not contaminated with dioxins.

== History ==
Largely inspired by the British use of herbicides and defoliants during the Malayan Emergency, killing rice was a military strategy from the very start of U.S. military involvement in Vietnam. At first, U.S. soldiers attempted to blow up rice paddies and rice stocks, using mortars and hand grenades. But grains of rice were far more durable than they understood, and were not easily destroyed. Every grain that survived was a seed to be collected and planted again. A 1967 report to the International War Crimes Tribunal stated that "The soldiers discovered that rice is one of the most maddeningly difficult substances to destroy; using thermite metal grenades it is almost impossible to make it burn and, even if one succeeds in scattering the rice, this does not stop it being harvested by patient men." The purpose of Agent Blue was to kill narrow-leafed plants and trees (grass, rice, bamboo, banana, etc.)

"Operation Ranch Hand" was military code for spraying of herbicides from U.S. Air Force aircraft in Southeast Asia from 1962 through 1971. The widespread use of herbicides in Southeast Asia during the Vietnam War was a unique military operation in that it was meant to kill the plants that provided cover. The continued use of Agent Blue and the other "Rainbow Herbicides" by the United States was primarily meant as an operation to take away the enemy's advantage on the terrain as well as deprive them of food.

Between 1962 and 1971, the U.S. used an estimated 20,000,000 U.S. gal (76,000,000 L; 17,000,000 imp gal) of herbicides as chemical weapons for "defoliation and crop destruction" which fell mostly on the forest of South Vietnam, but was eventually used in Laos as well to kill crops in order to deprive the communist Viet Cong and North Vietnamese troops of food. It was sprayed on rice paddies and other crops in an attempt to deprive the Viet Cong of the valuable crops the plants provided. Agent Blue is chemically unrelated to the more infamous Agent Orange and other herbicides used during the war.

Agent Blue, a herbicide containing cacodylic acid and sodium cacodylate, was used by the United States military during the Vietnam War to destroy plant life, particularly in rice paddies, which was a major food source for the Viet Cong and the North Vietnamese Army. The herbicide caused plants to dry out and become unsuitable for further planting. Agent Blue was also used in areas where the foliage was a hindrance to military operations. The Viet Cong were familiar with the abundant plant life in Vietnam, giving them an advantage in fighting on the battlefield. Approximately 4,000,000 U.S. gal (15,000,000 L; 3,300,000 imp gal) of Agent Blue were used in Vietnam during the war, with delivery of the herbicide primarily done by the Ansul Chemical Company. The US found themselves at a disadvantage and based on the precedent set by the British in Malaya, decided that the most vicious (best) retaliation would be to take the Vietcong's advantage away from them by removing their cover. Along roads, canals, railroads, and other transportation networks, Ranch Hand cleared several hundred yards using the herbicides to make ambushes more difficult for their enemies. In Laos, the herbicide removed the jungle canopy from the roads and trails used for infiltrating men and supplies, making them more vulnerable to attack from the air.

During the Vietnam War, about 4,000,000 U.S. gal (15,000,000 L; 3,300,000 imp gal) of Agent Blue, a herbicide containing 26.4% sodium cacodylate and 4.7% cacodylic acid in water, were used. The Ansul Chemical Company supplied the herbicide Phytar 560 with these chemical compounds from 1965 onwards.

Cacodylic acid is still used on crops throughout the United States. Arsenical herbicides containing cacodylic acid as an active ingredient are still used today as weed-killers. It sprayed on cotton fields, drying out the cotton plants before harvesting. In 2009, the MSMA uses on athletic fields, parks, residential lawns, forestry, non-bearing fruit and nut trees, and citrus orchards were also canceled.
