= Enlist Weed Control System =

Agricultural system

The Enlist Weed Control System is an agricultural system that includes seeds for genetically modified crops that are resistant to Enlist (a broadleaf herbicide with two active agents, 2,4-Dichlorophenoxyacetic acid (2,4-D) and glyphosate) and the Enlist herbicide; spraying the herbicide will kill weeds but not the resulting crop. The system was developed by Dow AgroSciences, part of Dow Chemical Company. In October 2014 the system was registered for restricted use in Illinois, Indiana, Iowa, Ohio, South Dakota and Wisconsin by the US Environmental Protection Agency. In 2013, the system was approved by Canada for the same uses.

The Enlist approach was developed to replace the "Roundup-Ready" system that was introduced in 1996 by Monsanto and which has become less useful with the rise of glyphosate-resistant weeds.

== Enlist Duo ==
Enlist Duo is an herbicide that contains the choline form of 2,4-Dichlorophenoxyacetic acid (2,4-D) and glyphosate plus an unknown number of unlisted ingredients. Dow added chemicals to the mixture in what it termed "Colex-D technology".

2,4-D is one of the most widely used herbicides in the world. 2,4-D is volatile and by EPA assessment is a hazardous air pollutant that is difficult to contain. According to Dow, the Colex-D formulation reduces drift and damage from evaporation. As of 2013 glyphosate was the world's largest-selling herbicide, with sales driven by glyphosate-resistant genetically modified crops.

Other countries assessing the system include Brazil, Argentina and various food importing countries.

== Enlist crops ==
As of April 2014 maize and soybeans resistant to 2,4-D and glyphosate had been approved in Canada, and in September 2014 the USDA approved the same two crops.

== Criticism ==
2,4-D was one of the main ingredients of Agent Orange, a defoliant used during the Vietnam War that was blamed for many health problems. According to a Reuters article the main health problems arose from TCDD contamination created in the synthesis of the other Agent Orange component, 2,4,5-T

The U.S. Environmental Protection Agency has moved to rescind its approval due to conflicting claims from the manufacturer about synergistic effects from mixing the two herbicides. Dow had told the EPA that the combination of the two herbicides did not enhance their toxicity to plants, but an earlier patent application from Dow claimed that it did.
