= Dichlorprop =

Names
- IUPAC name (R)-2-(2,4-dichlorophenoxy)propanoic acid
- Other names 2,4-DP

Identifiers
| CAS Number | 120-36-5 |
| 3D model (JSmol) | Interactive image |
| ChEBI | CHEBI:75375 |
| ChEMBL | ChEMBL573221 |
| ChemSpider | 8120 |
| ECHA InfoCard | 100.003.991 |
| EC Number | 204-390-5 |
| KEGG | C11020 |
| PubChem CID | 8427 |
| RTECS number | UF1050000 |
| UNII | J7YV2RKO6Q |
| UN number | 3077 2765 |
| CompTox Dashboard (EPA) | DTXSID0020440 |
- InChI: InChI=1S/C9H8Cl2O3/c1-5(9(12)13)14-8-3-2-6(10)4-7(8)11/h2-5H,1H3,(H,12,13) Key: MZHCENGPTKEIGP-UHFFFAOYSA-N; InChI=1/C9H8Cl2O3/c1-5(9(12)13)14-8-3-2-6(10)4-7(8)11/h2-5H,1H3,(H,12,13) Key: MZHCENGPTKEIGP-UHFFFAOYAD
- SMILES: Clc1cc(Cl)ccc1OC(C(=O)O)C

Properties
| Chemical formula | C_{9}H_{8}Cl_{2}O_{3} |
| Molar mass | 235.064 g/mol |
| Appearance | white solid |
| Melting point | 116 to 120 °C (241 to 248 °F; 389 to 393 K) R-isomer |
| Boiling point | 215 °C |
| Solubility in water | 720 mg/L at 20 °C (R-isomer) |

Hazards
- GHS labelling
| Pictograms | (GHS05: Corrosive) (GHS07: Exclamation mark) |
| Signal word | Danger |
| Hazard statements | H302, H312, H315, H318 |
| Precautionary statements | P264, P270, P280, P301+P312, P302+P352, P305+P351+P338, P310, P312, P321, P322, P330, P332+P313, P362, P363, P501 |
| Flash point | 204 °C (399 °F; 477 K) |

Related compounds
| Related compounds | 2,4-D |
- Except where otherwise noted, data are given for materials in their standard state (at 25 °C [77 °F], 100 kPa). verify (what is ?) Infobox references

Dichlorprop is a chlorophenoxy herbicide similar in structure to 2,4-D that is used to kill annual and perennial broadleaf weeds. It is a component of many common weedkillers. About 4 million pounds of dichlorprop are used annually in the United States.

== Chemistry ==
R-dichlorprop (dichlorprop-p)

Dichlorprop possesses a single asymmetric carbon and is therefore a chiral molecule, however only the R-isomer is active as an herbicide. When dichlorprop was first marketed in the 1960s, it was sold as racemic mixture of stereoisomers, but since then advances in asymmetric synthesis have made possible the production of the enantiopure compound. Today, only R-dichlorprop (also called dichlorprop-p or 2,4-DP-p) and its derivatives are sold as pesticides in the United States.

Dichlorprop is a carboxylic acid, and like related herbicides with free acid groups, it is often sold as a salt or ester. Currently, the 2-ethylhexyl ester is used commercially. The butoxyethyl and isooctyl esters were once popular, but are no longer approved for agricultural use. For the salts, the dimethylamine salt is still available, while the diethanolamine salt is no longer used.

== Mechanism of action in plants ==
According to the United States Environmental Protection Agency (EPA), "2,4-DP-p is thought to increase cell wall plasticity, biosynthesis of proteins, and the production of ethylene. The abnormal increase in these processes result in abnormal and excessive cell division and growth, damaging vascular tissue. The most susceptible tissues are those that are undergoing active cell division and growth."

== Health effects ==
The EPA rates the oral acute toxicity of dichlorprop as "slight" based on a rat LD_{50} of 537 mg/kg, and its derivatives are even less toxic. It is, however, considered to be a severe eye irritant. There has been concern that chlorophenoxy herbicides including dichlorprop may cause cancer, and in 1987 the International Agency for Research on Cancer (IARC) ranked this class of compounds as group 2B "possibly carcinogenic to humans". The EPA classifies the R-isomer as “Not Likely to be Carcinogenic to Humans.”
