= Chlorophenoxy herbicide =

Chemical structure of 2,4-D, the prototypical chlorophenoxy herbicide

Chlorophenoxy herbicides are a subclass of phenoxy herbicides which includes: MCPA, 2,4-D, 2,4,5-T and mecoprop. Large amounts have been produced since the 1950s for agriculture. Acute toxic effects after oral consumption are varied and may include: vomiting, abdominal pain, diarrhoea, gastrointestinal haemorrhage acutely followed by coma, hypertonia, hyperreflexia, ataxia, nystagmus, miosis, hallucinations and convulsions. Treatment with urinary alkalinization may be helpful but evidence to support this practice is limited.

== See also ==
- Health effects of pesticides
