= Agent White =

Code name of Chemical Agent used during Vietnam war by Americans

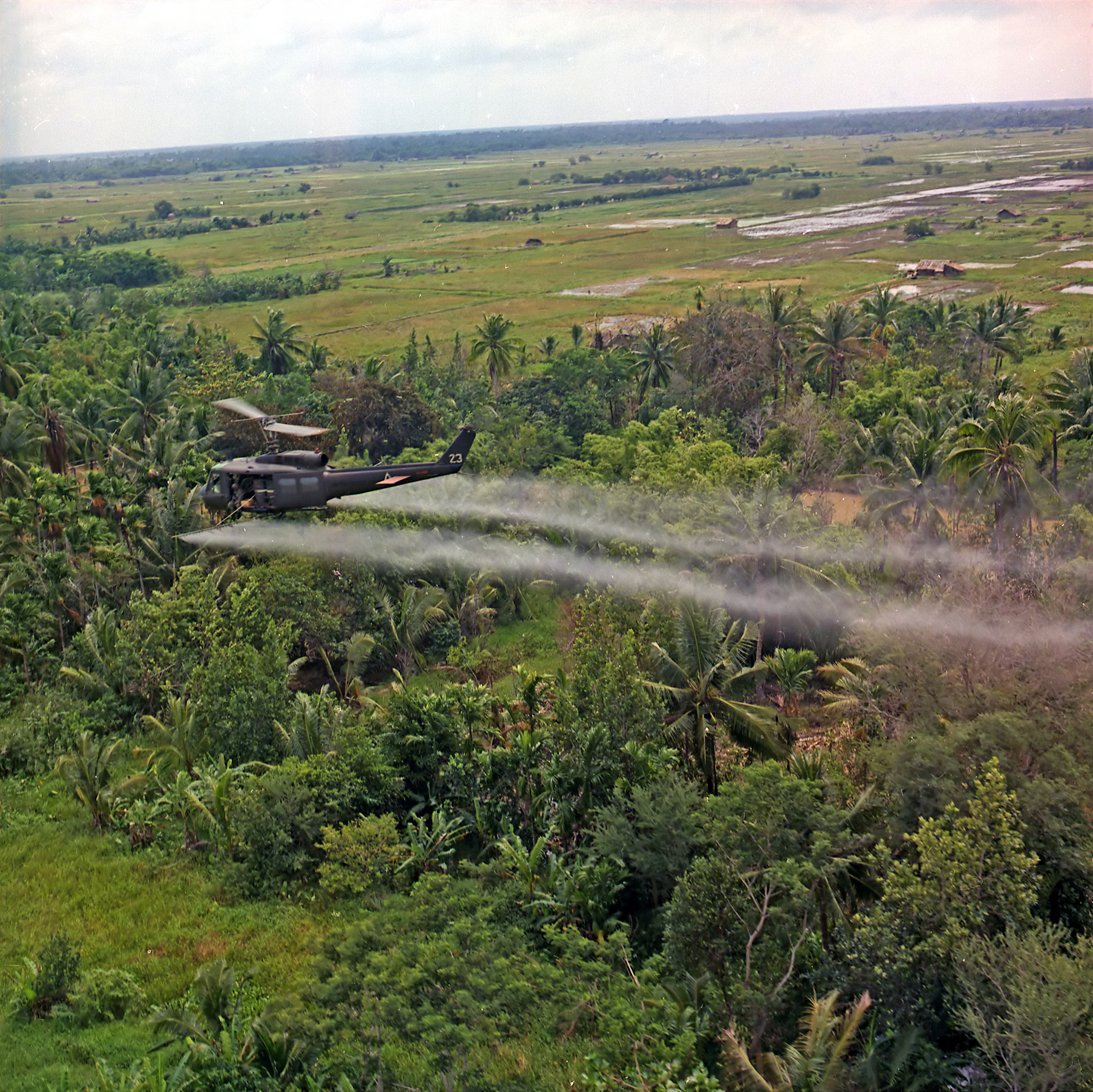
Defoliation agent spraying in Vietnam

Agent White is the code name for a herbicide used by the U.S. military in its herbicidal warfare program during the Vietnam War. The name comes from the regulatory requirements of identifying each container of the various herbicides through the addition of colored stripes. The colors used were orange, purple, pink, blue, and white by the manufacturers to ensure that the contents were easily identifiable during shipment and usage, as the colors were selected by the U.S. government. Largely inspired by the British use of herbicides and defoliants during the Malayan Emergency, it was one of the so-called "rainbow herbicides".

Agent White is a 4:1 mixture of 2,4-D and picloram. Agent White did not contain dioxin, which was a contaminant in some herbicide mixtures. Agent White was a proprietary product of the Dow Chemical Company.

Agent White was often used when Agent Orange was not available, including for several months after the use of Agent Orange was halted in April 1970. About 5,400,000 U.S. gal (20,000,000 L; 4,500,000 imp gal) of Agent White were used in Vietnam between 1966 and 1971. In addition, the US military tested Agent White, Tordon 101, and picloram in varying concentrations at test sites in the United States and Puerto Rico in the 1960s. Agent White was also tested at CFB Cold Lake in Alberta.

Under the brand name Tordon 101, Dow AgroSciences has commercialized a similar product containing a mixture of 2,4-D and picloram.
