= Gagetown =

Gagetown can refer to:

- Gagetown, New Brunswick, a historic community within the village of Arcadia.
  - CFB Gagetown, a Canadian military base located in southwestern New Brunswick
  - Gagetown (film), a feature-length documentary film about the chemical defoliant spray program that took place at CFB Gagetown from 1956 to 1984
- Gagetown Parish, New Brunswick
- Gagetown, Michigan, a village in the United States
