= Agent Pink =

Vietnam war-era herbicide

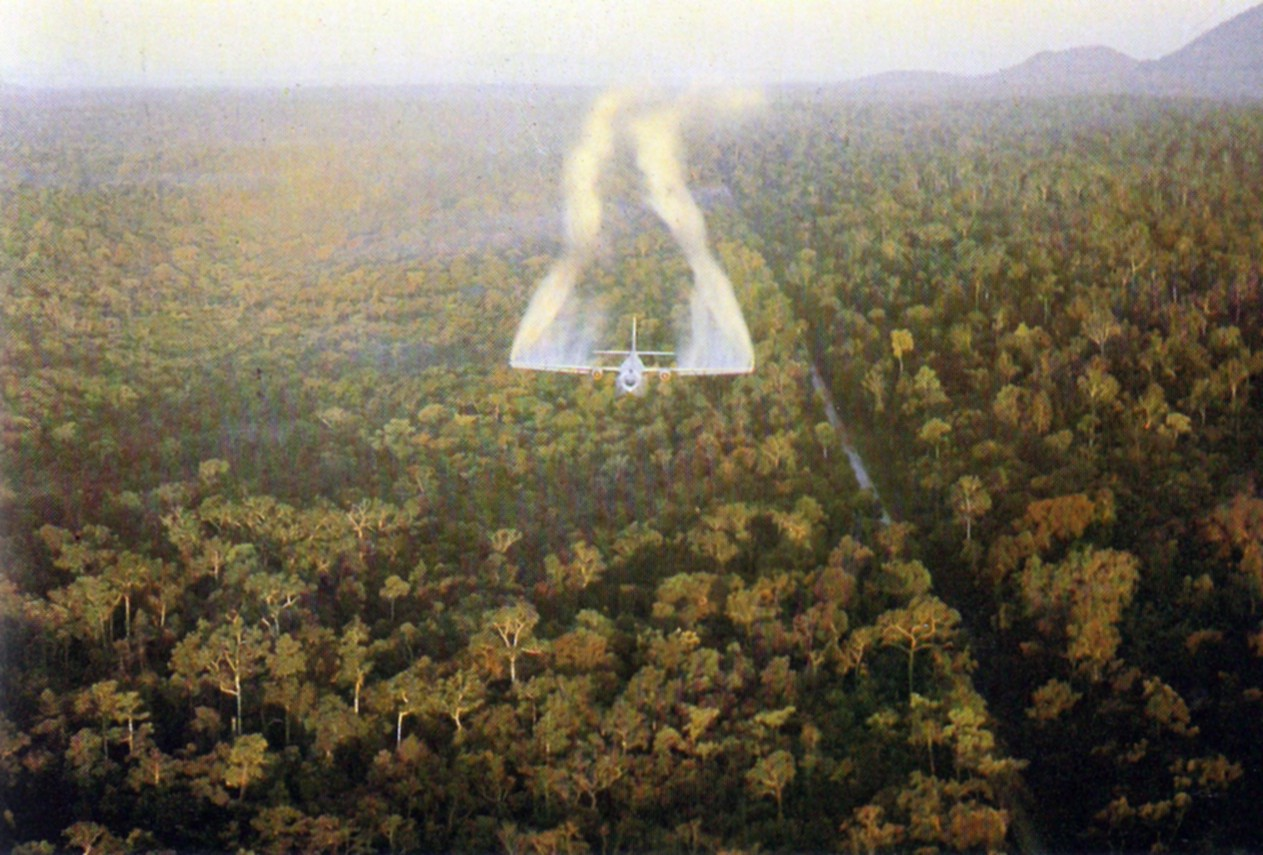
Ranch Hand UC-123B spraying defoliant in 1962

Agent Pink is the code name for a powerful herbicide and defoliant used by the U.S. military in its herbicidal warfare program during the Vietnam War. The name comes from the pink stripe painted on the barrels to identify the contents. Largely inspired by the British use of herbicides and defoliants during the Malayan Emergency, it was one of the rainbow herbicides that included the more infamous Agent Orange. Agent Pink was only used during the early "testing" stages of the spraying program before 1964.

Agent Pink's only active ingredient was 2,4,5-trichlorophenoxyacetic acid (2,4,5-T), one of the common phenoxy herbicides of the era. Agent Pink contained about 60%–40% of this active substance. Even prior to Operation Ranch Hand (1962–1971) it was known that a dioxin, 2,3,7,8-tetrachlorodibenzo-para-dioxin (TCDD), is produced as a byproduct of the manufacture of 2,4,5-T, and was present in any of the herbicides that used it, but to greater proportion in the earlier Agents, such as Pink.

A 2003 Nature paper by Stellman et al., which re-apprised the average TCDD content of Agent Orange from the 3 ppm that USAF had reported to a level of 13 ppm, also estimated that Agent Pink may have had 65.5 ppm of TCDD on average. The comparatively smaller amounts of Agent Pink and Agent Purple, with the spraying of 50,312 L (11,067 imp gal; 13,291 US gal) of Agent Pink is documented, but an additional 413,852 L (91,035 imp gal; 109,328 US gal) appear on procurement records, probably depositing a larger percentage of the total dioxin.
