= Mecoprop =

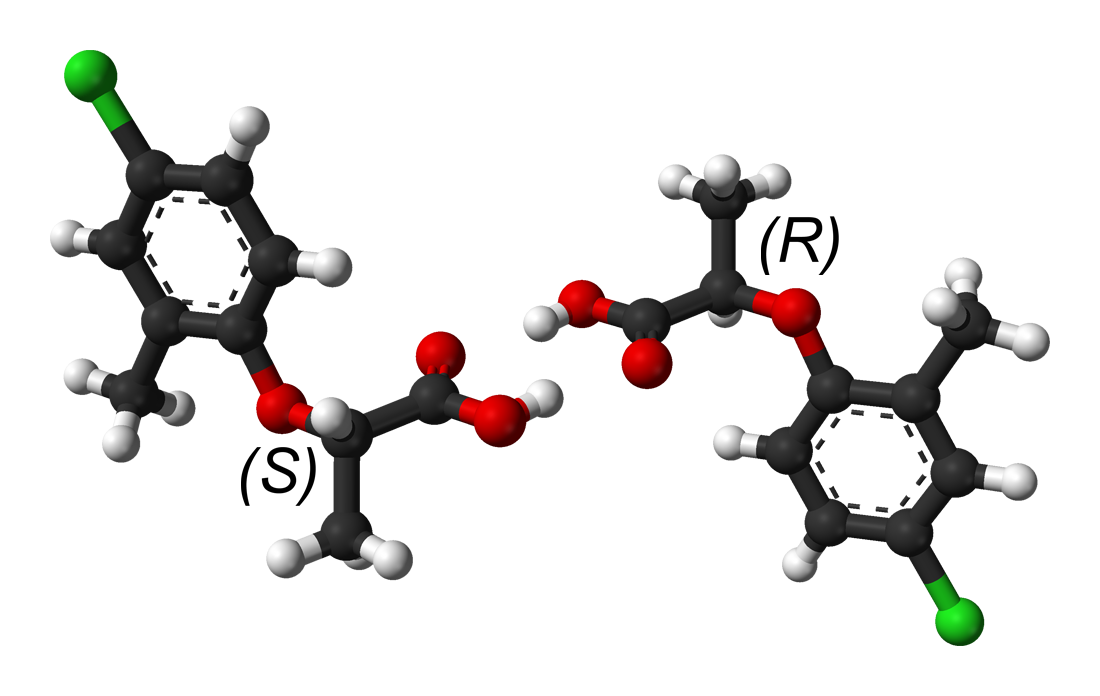

Names
- IUPAC name (RS)-2-(4-Chloro-2-methylphenoxy)propanoic acid

Identifiers
CAS Number	93-65-2
3D model (JSmol)	Interactive image
ChEBI	CHEBI:75704
ChEMBL	ChEMBL2145254
ChemSpider	6886
ECHA InfoCard	100.002.060
EC Number	230-386-8
KEGG	C18742
PubChem CID	7153
UNII	74N8TKR9P8
CompTox Dashboard (EPA)	DTXSID9024194
- InChI: InChI=1S/C10H11ClO3/c1-6-5-8(11)3-4-9(6)14-7(2)10(12)13/h3-5,7H,1-2H3,(H,12,13) Key: WNTGYJSOUMFZEP-UHFFFAOYSA-N; InChI=1/C10H11ClO3/c1-6-5-8(11)3-4-9(6)14-7(2)10(12)13/h3-5,7H,1-2H3,(H,12,13) Key: WNTGYJSOUMFZEP-UHFFFAOYAN
- SMILES: CC1=C(C=CC(=C1)Cl)OC(C)C(=O)O

Properties
Chemical formula	C_{10}H_{11}ClO_{3}
Molar mass	214.65 g·mol^{−1}
Appearance	Solid
Melting point	94 to 95 °C (201 to 203 °F; 367 to 368 K)
Boiling point	decomposes
Solubility in water	900 mg/L (20 °C)

Hazards
- Occupational safety and health (OHS/OSH)
Main hazards	Xn, N
- Except where otherwise noted, data are given for materials in their standard state (at 25 °C [77 °F], 100 kPa). Infobox references

Mecoprop (also known as methylchlorophenoxypropionic acid and MCPP) is a common general use herbicide found in many household weed killers and "weed-and-feed" type lawn fertilizers. It is primarily used to control broadleaf weeds. It is often used in combination with other chemically related herbicides such as 2,4-D, dicamba, and MCPA, which mimic the plant hormone IAA (auxin) and kill most broadleaf weeds by causing uncontrolled growth.

Mecoprop is a mixture of two stereoisomers, with the (R)-(+)-enantiomer ("Mecoprop-P", "Duplosan KV") possessing the herbicidal activity.

Structures of the two enantiomeric forms (S left, R right) of mecoprop

== Toxicology ==
The United States Environmental Protection Agency has classified mecoprop as toxicity class III - slightly toxic.

A 2023 review by the European Food Safety Authority stated that mecoprop‐P is a low risk to aquatic invertebrates, birds and soil macroorganisms. The EFSA highlighted critical data gaps regarding the herbicide's impact on honeybees.

== See also ==
- Clofibric acid
- Phenoxy herbicides
