= USNS Schuyler Otis Bland =

Military supplies transport vessel

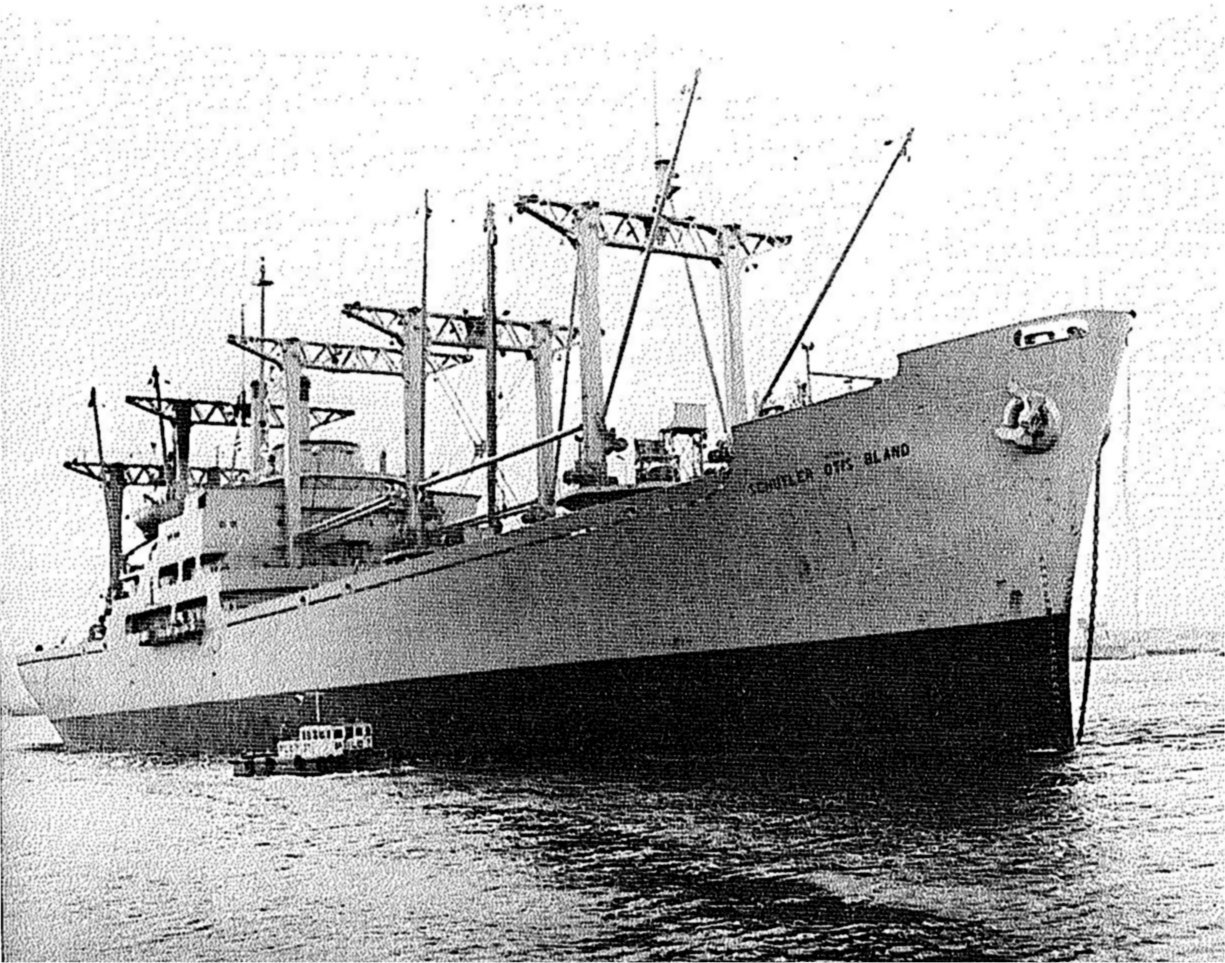

History

United States
- Name: Schuyler Otis Bland
- Builder: Ingalls Shipbuilding Corp
- Laid down: 9 May 1950
- Launched: 30 January 1951
- Acquired: by the US Navy 4 August 1961
- In service: 28 August 1961
- Out of service: 1979
- Fate: Sold for scrap 28 November 1979

General characteristics
- Type: Turbine Cargo Vessel
- Tonnage: 561,000 cu ft (15,900 m^{3})
- Displacement: 10,500 Tons light; 15,910 Tons loaded
- Length: 478 ft (145,70 m) overall; 454 ft (137,20 m) loaded waterline length
- Beam: 66 ft (20 m)
- Draft: 27 ft (8.2 m)
- Propulsion: Steam Turbine powered, 1 gearbox and 1 fixed pitch propeller
- Speed: 18.5 knots (34.3 km/h)
- Crew: 50

USNS Schuyler Otis Bland also known as SS Schuyler Otis Bland is the only ship of the series C3-S-DX1 (Freedom-class).

Schuyler Otis Bland was laid down, 9 May 1950, as a Maritime Commission type (C3-S-DX1), under Maritime Commission contract (MC hull 2918), at Ingalls Shipbuilding, Pascagoula, MS.

Schuyler Otis Bland was a prototype of the series C3-S-DX1 and what was to have been the "Bland class" of cargo ships, but Maritime Administration designers conceived of the even more modern "Mariner class" following her construction. Following the acquisition of MARCOM by United States Maritime Administration (MARAD) in 1950, the design was done as a C3-S-7. She was launched January 30, 1951, and delivered to the Maritime Commission July 25, 1951.

Schuyler Otis Bland was first assigned to the American President Lines under bareboat charter. She completed two round-the-world voyages before being transferred to the Waterman Steamship Corporation under a General Agency Agreement. On July 25, 1952, the C-3 cargo ship went into the National Defense Reserve Fleet at Mobile, Ala.

In 1957, Schuyler Otis Bland was acquired by the US Navy for operation by American Mail Lines. The American Mail Line had acquired her to replace the SS Washington Mail, which had foundered in a violent North Pacific storm. In October 1959, after more than two years with American Mail, she entered the National Defense Reserve Fleet at Olympia, Wash.

On August 4, 1961, USNS Schuyler Otis Bland was delivered to the Navy, and on August 28, assigned to the Military Sea Transport Service (MSTS) and placed in service as USNS Schuyler Otis Bland (T-AK-277). USNS Schuyler Otis Bland departed San Francisco on September 28, 1961, to carry cargo to Bangkok, Saigon, Manila, Kaohsiung, and other Pacific ports, beginning over a decade of service supplying military logistic requirements throughout the world.

She also delivered cargo in the mid 1970s for several consecutive Januaries to the USN and National Science Foundation operations at McMurdo Station, Antarctica. The Navy flew in a Port Handling Cargo Group for 30 days to off-load the ship via the man-made floating wharf (made of ice the previous winter and laced internally with steel cable as reinforcement)

== Disposition ==
On August 1, 1970, the Military Sea Transportation Service became Military Sealift Command. Schuyler Otis Bland was placed out of service in 1979 while at Guam. She was struck from the Naval Register, and transferred to MARAD for disposal. On November 28, 1979, she was sold for scrap to China Dismantled Vessel Trading Corporation, Kaohsiung, Taiwan for the price of $814,533.50

== Logbook and Okinawa controversy ==
The Bland was a civilian-owned ship regularly employed by the U.S. Navy to transport defoliants incognito and that was able to bypass customs inspections of military vessels entering foreign ports. The logbook of USNS Schuyler Otis Bland records that the ship was carrying classified cargo that was offloaded under armed guard at White Beach, a U.S. Navy port on Okinawa's east coast on April 25, 1962. Three months prior to its arrival at Okinawa, the Bland had traveled to South Vietnam to deliver one of the Pentagon's first shipments of defoliants. The account in the ship's logbook states the classified cargo was labeled "agriculture products." The ship's cargo was documented to include herbicide Agents Pink and Purple for covert tests in Southeast Asia.
