= Dow AgroSciences =

Wholly owned subsidiary of the Dow Chemical Company

Dow AgroSciences LLC
- Company type: Fully Owned Subsidiary
- Industry: Agricultural Supplies
- Founder: Eli Lilly and Company and Dow Chemical Company in 1989
- Successor: Corteva
- Headquarters: Zionsville, Indiana, United States
- Products: Insecticide, Herbicide, Fungicide, Fumigant and Seed Technologies
- Parent: Dow Chemical Company
- Website: www.dowagro.com

Dow AgroSciences LLC was a wholly owned subsidiary of the Dow Chemical Company specializing in not only agricultural chemicals such as pesticides, but also seeds and biotechnology solutions. The company was based in Indianapolis, Indiana, in the United States. On 31 January 2006, Dow AgroSciences announced that it had received regulatory approval for the world's first plant-cell-produced vaccine against Newcastle disease virus from USDA Center for Veterinary Biologics. Dow AgroSciences operates brand names such as Sentricon, Vikane, Mycogen®, SmartStax®, Enlist™, Pfister Seed®, PhytoGen®, Prairie Brand Seed®, Alforex Seeds®, Profume, Dairyland Seed®, and Brodbeck Seed®.

Dow AgroSciences also produces Omega-9 canola and sunflower oils.

In 2017, the Dow Chemical Company merged into DowDuPont and in April 2019, the company's parent, Dow Inc. was separated into a public company via a corporate spin-off. The Dow AgroSciences business unit remained with DowDuPont and was spun off into Corteva Inc, on June 3, 2019.

In October 2011, the U.S. Justice Department announced that a biotech specialist at Cargill had pleaded guilty to stealing information from Cargill and Dow AgroSciences. Kexue Huang, a Chinese national, was discovered to be passing information back to China from Dow for at least 3 years, from 2007 to 2010.

Dow AgroSciences unit was divested to be part of a new company Corteva.

== China ==
In 2014, Dow AgroSciences received the registration of Arylex's active ingredient (Halauxifen-methyl) from the Chinese Institute for the Control of Agrochemicals, Ministry of Agriculture (ICAMA). In the United States, Dow AgoSciences' Enlist Weed Control System was approved by the Department of Agriculture (USDA) and the Environmental Protection Agency (EPA) in 2014. Dow had submitted Enlist Corn for Chinese regulatory approval in 2011 and Enlist Soybean in 2012. As of 2017, even though 70 months have passed, approval is still being delayed by China's comparable regulatory agency, China's National Biosafety Committee (NBC). This has affected marketing, sales, and distribution of these products in the United States.

== See also ==
- Sylvia M. Stoesser Lecturer in Chemistry
