= 2,4-D =

Herbicide

2,4-Dichlorophenoxyacetic acid
- 2,4-dichlorophenoxyacetic acid

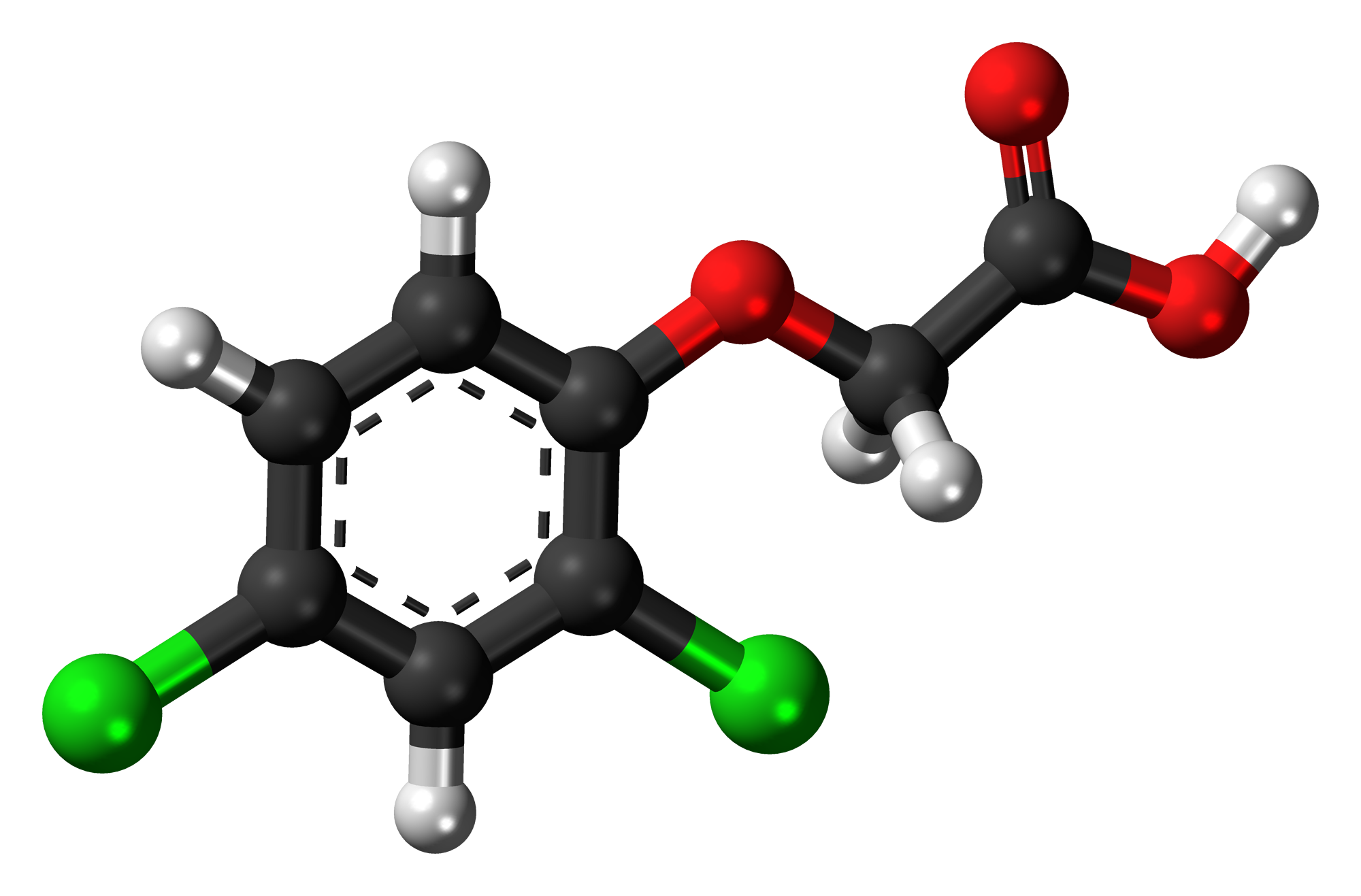

Names
- Preferred IUPAC name (2,4-Dichlorophenoxy)acetic acid
- Other names 2,4-D

Identifiers
CAS Number	94-75-7
3D model (JSmol)	Interactive image
ChEBI	CHEBI:28854
ChEMBL	ChEMBL367623
ChemSpider	1441
ECHA InfoCard	100.002.147
KEGG	C03664
PubChem CID	1486
UNII	2577AQ9262
CompTox Dashboard (EPA)	DTXSID0020442
- InChI: InChI=1S/C8H6Cl2O3/c9-5-1-2-7(6(10)3-5)13-4-8(11)12/h1-3H,4H2,(H,11,12) Key: OVSKIKFHRZPJSS-UHFFFAOYSA-N; InChI=1/C8H6Cl2O3/c9-5-1-2-7(6(10)3-5)13-4-8(11)12/h1-3H,4H2,(H,11,12) Key: OVSKIKFHRZPJSS-UHFFFAOYAM
- SMILES: Clc1cc(Cl)ccc1OCC(=O)O

Properties
Chemical formula	C_{8}H_{6}Cl_{2}O_{3}
Molar mass	221.04 g/mol
Appearance	white to yellow powder
Melting point	140.5 °C (284.9 °F; 413.6 K)
Boiling point	160 °C (320 °F; 433 K) 0.4 mm Hg
Solubility in water	900 mg/L

Hazards
- GHS labelling
Pictograms	(GHS07: Exclamation mark) (GHS05: Corrosive)
Hazard statements	H302, H317, H318, H335, H412
Precautionary statements	P261, P273, P280, P305+P351+P338
Flash point	nonflammable
- Lethal dose or concentration (LD, LC)
LD_{50} (median dose)	500 mg/kg (oral, hamster) 100 mg/kg (oral, dog); 347 mg/kg (oral, mouse); 699 mg/kg (oral, rat)
- NIOSH (US health exposure limits)
PEL (Permissible)	TWA 10 mg/m^{3}
REL (Recommended)	TWA 10 mg/m^{3}
IDLH (Immediate danger)	100 mg/m^{3}
Safety data sheet (SDS)	ICSC 0033

Related compounds
Related compounds	2,4,5-T, Dichlorprop
- Except where otherwise noted, data are given for materials in their standard state (at 25 °C [77 °F], 100 kPa). Infobox references

2,4-Dichlorophenoxyacetic acid is an organic compound with the chemical formula C_{8}H_{6}Cl_{2}O_{3}. It is usually referred to by its ISO common name 2,4-D. It is a systemic herbicide that kills most broadleaf weeds by causing uncontrolled growth, but most grasses such as cereals, lawn turf, and grassland are relatively unaffected.

2,4-D is one of the oldest and most widely available herbicides and defoliants in the world, having been commercially available since 1945, and is now produced by many chemical companies since the patent on it has long since expired. It can be found in numerous commercial lawn herbicide mixtures, and is widely used as a weedkiller on cereal crops, pastures, and orchards. Over 1,500 herbicide products contain 2,4-D as an active ingredient.

== History ==
William Templeman found that when indole-3-acetic acid (IAA), a naturally occurring auxin, was used at high concentrations, it could stop plant growth. In 1940, he published his finding that IAA killed broadleaf plants within a cereal field. MCPA was discovered at about that time by his ICI group.

In the United States, a similar search for an acid with a longer half life, i.e., a metabolically and environmentally more stable compound, led to 2,4-dichlorophenoxyacetic acid (2,4-D) and 2,4,5-trichlorophenoxyacetic acid (2,4,5-T), both phenoxy herbicides and analogs of IAA. Robert Pokorny, an industrial chemist for the C.B. Dolge Company in Westport, Connecticut, published their synthesis in 1941, with details of the biology reported in 1944 by Franklin D. Jones. The discovery of multiple similar phenoxy herbicides during World War II, is a case of multiple discovery. There were four groups working independently in the United Kingdom and the United States: William G. Templeman and associates at Imperial Chemical Industries (ICI) in the UK; Philip S. Nutman and associates at Rothamsted Research in the UK; Franklin D. Jones and associates at the American Chemical Paint Company; and Ezra Kraus, John W. Mitchell, and associates at the University of Chicago and the United States Department of Agriculture. All four groups were subject to wartime secrecy laws and did not follow the usual procedures of publication and patent disclosure. In December 1942, following a meeting at the Ministry of Agriculture the Rothamsted and ICI workers pooled resources and Nutman moved to Jealott's Hill to join the ICI effort. The first scientific publication describing the 2,4-D structure and plant growth regulating activity was by Percy Zimmerman and Albert Hitchcock at the Boyce Thompson Institute, who were not the original inventors. The precise sequence of early 2,4-D discovery events and publications has been discussed.

2,4-D was not used as a chemical warfare agent during World War II. The Allies of World War II were looking for a chemical to starve Nazi Germany and Japan into submission by killing their potato and rice crops, but 2,4-D was found to be ineffective for that purpose, because both crops tolerate it. Within a year after the war ended, 2,4-D was commercially released as an herbicide to control broadleaf weeds in grain crops such as rice and wheat, and in the 1950s it was registered in the United States to control size and enhance skin color in potatoes without affecting yields.

The first publication of 2,4-D's use as a selective herbicide came in 1944. The ability of 2,4-D to control broadleaf weeds in turf was documented soon thereafter, in 1944. Starting in 1945, the American Chemical Paint Company brought 2,4-D to market as an herbicide called "Weedone". It revolutionized weed control, as it was the first compound that, at low doses, could selectively control dicotyledons (broadleaf plants), but not most monocotyledons — narrowleaf crops, such as wheat, maize (corn), rice, and similar cereal grass crops. At a time when labor was scarce and the need for increased food production was large, it literally "replaced the hoe". Its effectiveness, together with its non-corrosive, non-explosive and seemingly non-irritating or poisonous qualities, led to it being considered the best all-around herbicide by 1946.

2,4-D is one of the ingredients in Agent Orange, an herbicide that was widely used during the Malayan Emergency and the Vietnam War. However, 2,3,7,8-tetrachlorodibenzodioxin (TCDD), a contaminant in the production of another ingredient in Agent Orange, 2,4,5-T, was the cause of the adverse health effects associated with Agent Orange.

In the 2000s, Dow AgroSciences developed a new choline salt version of 2,4-D (2,4-D choline) that Dow included in its "Enlist Duo" herbicide along with glyphosate and an agent that reduces drift; the choline salt form of 2,4-D is less volatile than 2,4-D.

== Manufacture ==
2,4-D is a member of the phenoxy family of herbicides. It is manufactured from chloroacetic acid and 2,4-dichlorophenol, which is itself produced by chlorination of phenol. Alternatively, it is produced by the chlorination of phenoxyacetic acid. The production processes may create several contaminants including di-, tri-, and tetrachlorodibenzo-p-dioxin isomers and N-nitrosamines, as well as monochlorophenol.

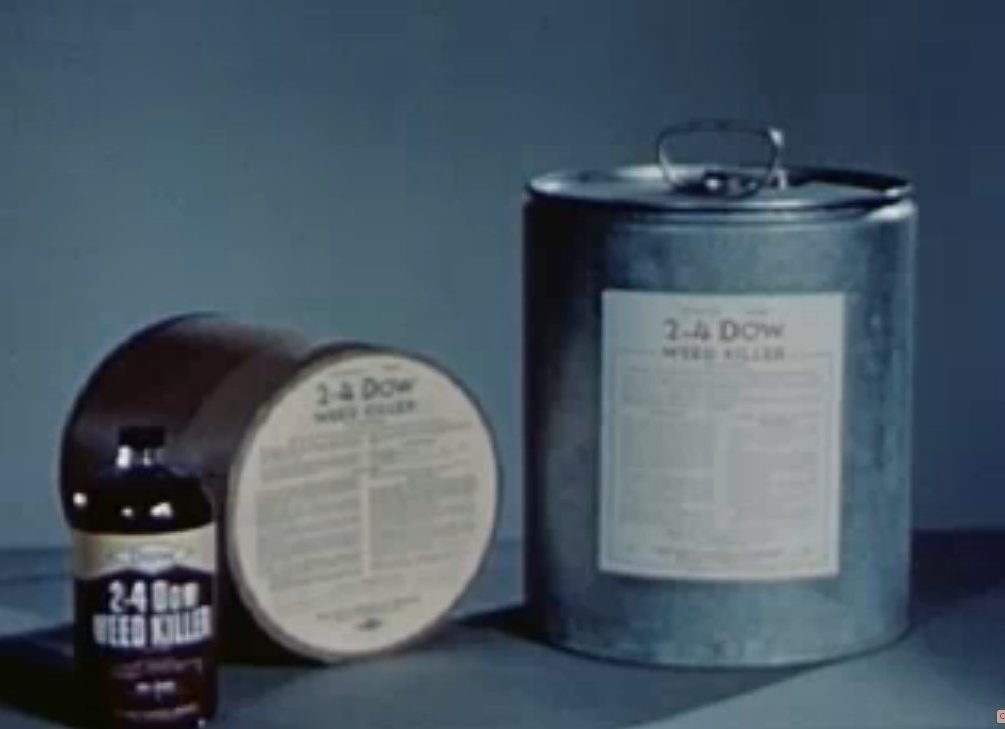
Containers of 2-4 D herbicide, ca. 1947

== Mode of action ==
2,4-D is a synthetic auxin that induces uncontrolled growth and eventually death in susceptible plants. It is absorbed through the leaves and is translocated to the meristems of the plant. Uncontrolled, unsustainable growth ensues, causing stem curl-over, leaf withering, and eventual plant death. 2,4-D is typically applied as an amine salt, but more potent ester versions exist, as well.

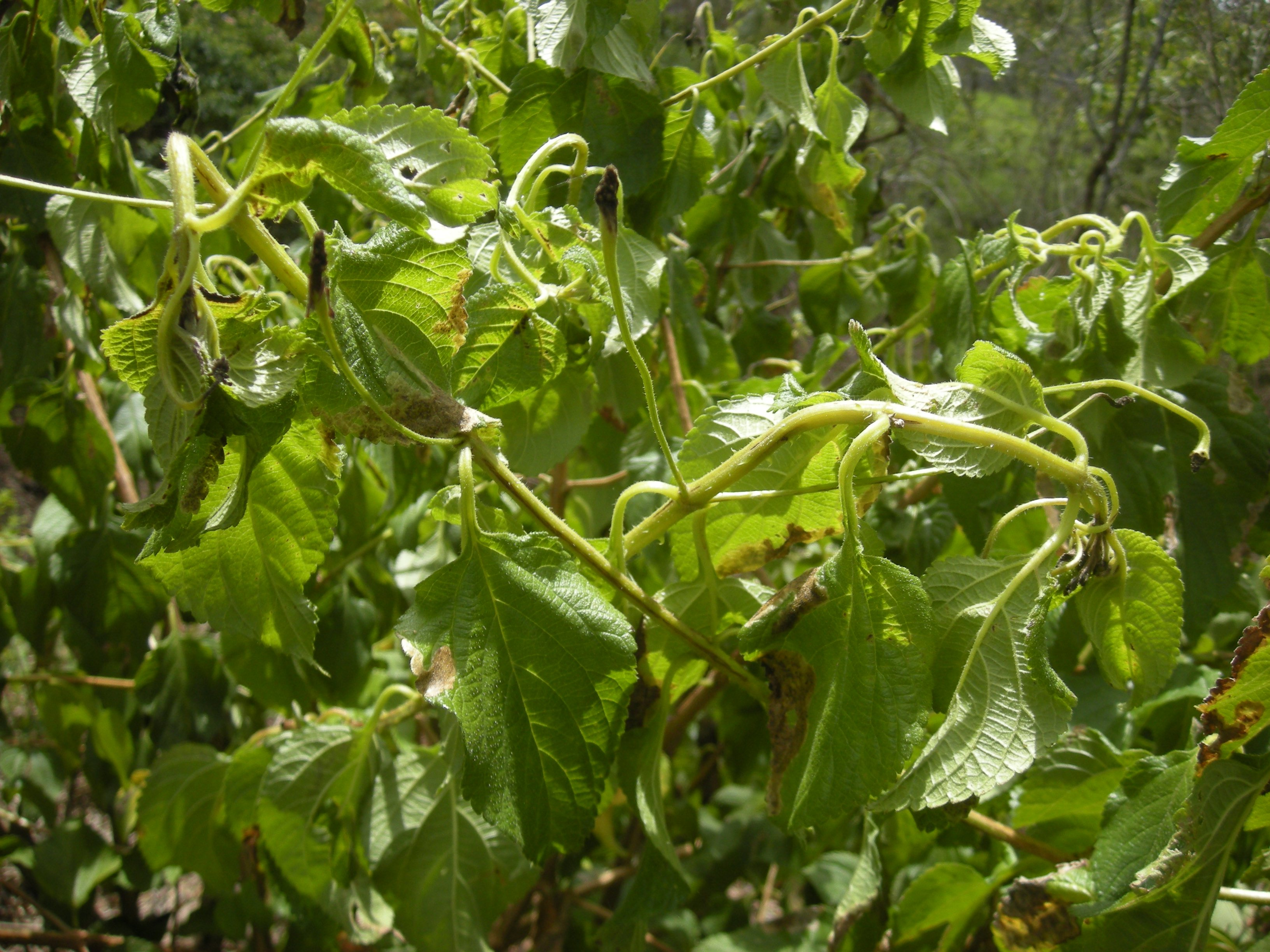
Effect of 2-4-D foliar application on Lantana

== Applications ==
2,4-D is primarily used as a selective herbicide that kills many terrestrial and aquatic broadleaf weeds, but not grasses. 2,4-D can be found in commercial lawn herbicide mixtures, which often contain other active ingredients including mecoprop and dicamba. Over 1,500 herbicide products contain 2,4-D as an active ingredient.

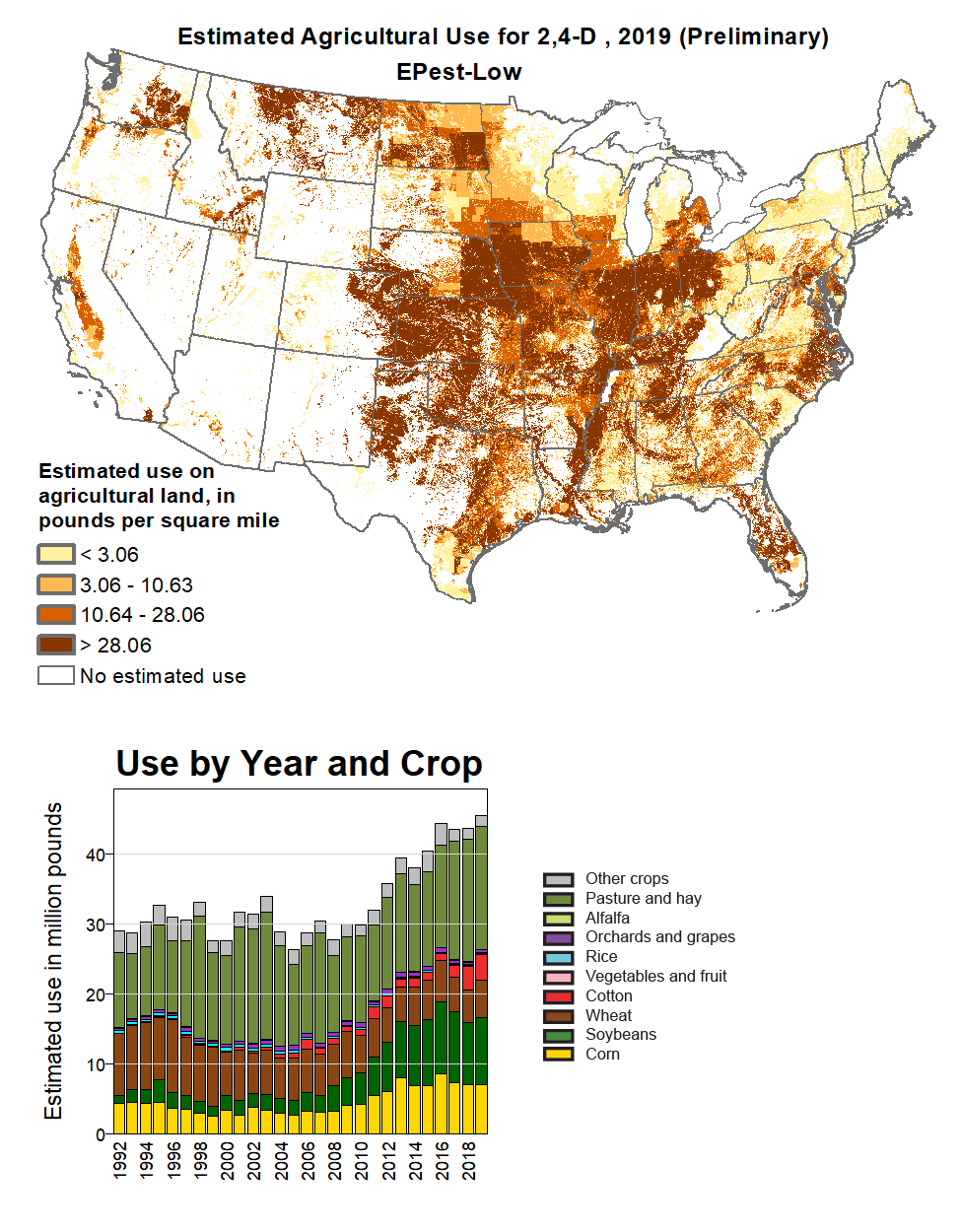
Estimated use of 2,4-D in the USA to 2019

A variety of sectors use products containing 2,4-D to kill weeds and unwanted vegetation. In agriculture, it was the first herbicide for selective killing of weeds but not crops. It has been used since 1945 to control broad-leafed weeds in pastures, orchards, and cereal crops such as corn, oats, rice, and wheat. Cereals, in particular, have excellent tolerance to 2,4-D when it is applied before planting. 2,4-D is the cheapest way for farmers to control winter annual weeds by spraying in the fall, often at the lowest recommended rate. This is particularly effective before planting beans, peas, lentils, and chickpeas. The estimated use of 2,4-D in US agriculture is mapped by the US Geological Survey. In 2019, the latest date for which figures are available, this reached 45,000,000 pounds (20,000,000 kg) annually.

In domestic lawn and garden maintenance, 2,4-D is commonly used. In forestry, it is used for stump treatment, trunk injection, and selective control of brush in conifer forests. Along roadways, railways, and power lines, it is used to control weeds and brush which might interfere with safe operation and damage equipment. Along waterways, it is used to control aquatic weeds that might interfere with boating, fishing, and swimming or clog irrigation and hydroelectric equipment. It is often used by government agencies to control the spread of invasive, noxious, and non-native weed species and prevent them from crowding out native species, and also to control many poisonous weeds such as poison ivy and poison oak.

A 2010 monitoring study conducted in the US and Canada found that "current exposures to 2,4-D are below applicable exposure guidance values."

2,4-D has been used in laboratories for plant research as a supplement in plant cell culture media such as MS medium since at least 1962. 2,4-D is used in plant cell cultures as a dedifferentiation (callus induction) hormone. It is classified as an auxin plant hormone derivative.

== Health effects ==
Men who work with 2,4-D are at risk for abnormally shaped sperm and thus fertility problems; the risk depends on the amount and duration of exposure and other personal factors.

=== Acute toxicity ===
According to the U.S. Environmental Protection Agency, "The toxicity of 2,4-D depends on its chemical forms, including salts, esters, and an acid form. 2,4-D generally has low toxicity for humans, except certain acid and salt forms can cause eye irritation. Swimming is restricted for 24 hours after application of certain 2,4-D products applied to control aquatic weeds to avoid eye irritation." As of 2005 the median lethal dose or LD_{50} determined in acute toxicity rat studies was 639 mg/kg.

Urinary alkalinisation has been used in acute poisoning, but evidence to support its use is poor.

=== Cancer risk ===
The International Agency for Research on Cancer classifies 2,4-D as a possible carcinogen to humans while the United States Environmental Protection Agency does not. The International Agency for Research on Cancer (IARC), said 2,4-D was classified as "possibly carcinogenic to humans (Group 2B), based on inadequate evidence in humans and limited evidence in experimental animals".

In June 2015 the World Health Organization's International Agency for Research on Cancer confirmed its 1987 classification of 2,4-D as a possible carcinogen.

On August 8, 2007, the EPA issued a ruling that existing data do not support a link between human cancer and 2,4-D exposure.

A 1995 panel of 13 scientists reviewing studies on the carcinogenicity of 2,4-D had divided opinions. None of the scientists thought the weight of the evidence indicated that 2,4-D was a "known" or "probable" cause of human cancer. The predominant opinion indicated that it is possible that 2,4-D can cause cancer in humans, although not all of the panelists believed the possibility was equally likely: one thought the possibility was strong, leaning toward probable, and five thought the possibility was remote, leaning toward unlikely. Two panelists believed it unlikely that 2,4-D can cause cancer in humans.

In a prior 1987 report the IARC classified some chlorphenoxy herbicides including 2,4-D, MCPA and 2,4,5-T as a group as class 2B carcinogens - "possibly carcinogenic to humans".

2,4-D has been linked to lymphoma and bladder cancer in dogs.

=== Contaminants ===
A July 2013 Four Corners investigation found elevated levels of dioxins in a generic version of 2,4-D, one of Australia's most widely used herbicides. Samples imported from China had "one of the highest dioxin readings for 2,4-D in the last 10 to 20 years, and could pose potential health risks."

== Metabolism ==
When radioactively labeled 2,4-D was fed to livestock, 90% or more of the total radioactive residue (TRR) was shed in urine unchanged or as conjugated forms of 2,4-D. A relatively small portion of 2,4-D was metabolized into dichlorophenol, dichloroanisole, 4-chlorophenoxyacetic acid (6.9% of the TRR in milk), and 2,4-dichlorophenol (5% of the TRR in milk; 7.3% of the TRR in eggs and 4% of the TRR in chicken liver). Residue levels in kidney were the highest.

== Environmental behavior ==
Owing to the longevity and extent of use, 2,4-D has been evaluated several times by regulators and review committees.

2,4-D amine salts and esters are not persistent under most environmental conditions. The degradation of 2,4-D is rapid (half life of 6.2 days) in aerobic mineral soils. 2,4-D is broken down by microbes in soil, in processes that involve hydroxylation, cleavage of the acid side-chain, decarboxylation, and ring opening. The ethyl hexyl form of the compound is rapidly hydrolyzed in soil and water to form the 2,4-D acid. 2,4-D has a low binding affinity in mineral soils and sediment, and in those conditions is considered intermediately to highly mobile, and therefore likely to leach if not degraded.

In aerobic aquatic environments, the half life is 15 days. In anaerobic aquatic environments 2,4-D is more persistent, with a half life of 41 to 333 days. 2,4-D has been detected in streams and shallow groundwater at low concentrations, in both rural and urban areas. Breakdown is pH dependent. Some ester forms are highly toxic to fish and other aquatic life.

"The ester forms of 2,4-D can be highly toxic to fish and other aquatic life. 2,4-D generally has moderate toxicity to birds and mammals, is slightly toxic to fish and aquatic invertebrates, and is practically nontoxic to honeybees" per EPA.

=== Microbial breakdown ===
A number of 2,4-D-degrading bacteria have been isolated and characterized from a variety of environmental habitats. Metabolic pathways for the compound's degradation have been available for many years, and genes encoding 2,4-D catabolism have been identified for several organisms. As a result of the extensive metadata on environmental behavior, physiology, and genetics, 2,4-D was the first herbicide for which the bacteria actively responsible for in situ degradation were demonstrated. This was accomplished using the technique of DNA-based stable isotope probing, which enables a microbial function (activity), such as degrading a chemical, to be linked with the organism's identity without the need to culture the organism involved.

== Regulation ==
Maximum residue limits were first set in the EU in 2002 and re-evaluated in 2011 by the European Food Safety Authority, which concluded that the codex maximum residue limits were "not expected to be of concern for European consumers". The total chronic exposure represented less than 10% of the acceptable daily intake (ADI). 2,4-D is currently not approved for use on lawns and gardens in Denmark, Norway, Kuwait, and the Canadian provinces of Québec and Ontario. 2,4-D use is severely restricted in the country of Belize. In 2008, Dow AgroScience, LLC, sued the Canadian government for allowing Quebec to ban 2,4-D, but settled in 2011.

In 2012, EPA denied the petition filed November 6, 2008, by the Natural Resources Defense Council to revoke all tolerances and to cancel all registrations of 2,4-D. EPA stated that new study and EPA's comprehensive review confirmed EPA's previous finding that the 2,4-D tolerances are safe at anticipated exposure. The estimated annual use of 2,4-D in US agriculture is mapped by the US Geological Service.

In October 2014, the US EPA registered Enlist Duo, an herbicide containing the less volatile 2,4-D choline salt, glyphosate, and an antidrift agent, for use in six states: Illinois, Indiana, Iowa, Ohio, South Dakota, and Wisconsin. In November 2015, the EPA attempted to withdraw its own approval of Enlist Duo, as a result of legal actions against both the agency and Dow by two U.S. groups. However, while it was implied that the approval was "gone" because of the action, in fact, Enlist Duo was still approved pending a decision by the courts. On January 25, 2016, the US Ninth Circuit Court of Appeals denied EPA's motion to vacate its Enlist Duo registration. Dow stated the product would be available in 15 US states and Canada for the 2016 crop season.

On August 21, 2013, the Australian Pesticides and Veterinary Medicines Authority (APVMA) banned selected 2,4-D high volatile ester (HVE) products due to their environmental hazards. HVE 2,4-D products had already been banned in Europe and North America for 20 years; low volatile ester products continue to be available in Australia and worldwide. In July 2013 APVMA published their report findings.

== Genetically modified crops ==
In 2010, Dow published that it had created genetically modified soybeans made resistant to 2,4-D by insertion of a bacterial aryloxyalkanoate dioxygenase gene, aad1. Dow intended it to be used as an alternative or complement to Roundup Ready crops due to the increasing prevalence of glyphosate-resistant weeds.

As of April 2014 genetically modified maize and soybeans resistant to 24-D and glyphosate have been approved in Canada. In September 2014 the USDA also approved Dow's maize and soybeans and in October the EPA registered the "Enlist Duo" herbicide containing 24-D and glyphosate.

== See also ==
- Genetically modified crops#Herbicide resistance
- Genetic pollution

== External links and further reading ==
- CDC - NIOSH Pocket Guide to Chemical Hazards
- Overview of the toxic effects of 2,4-D Sierra Club Canada January 2005
- "Review of 2,4-dichlorophenoxyacetic acid (2,4-D) biomonitoring and epidemiology" Review of the literature by Dow scientists Crit Rev Toxicol. Oct 2012
- PPDB Pesticides Properties database entry for 2,4-D
- 2,4-D on Pubchem
