= 2,4,5-Trichlorophenoxyacetic acid =

- 2,4,5-Trichlorophenoxyacetic acid

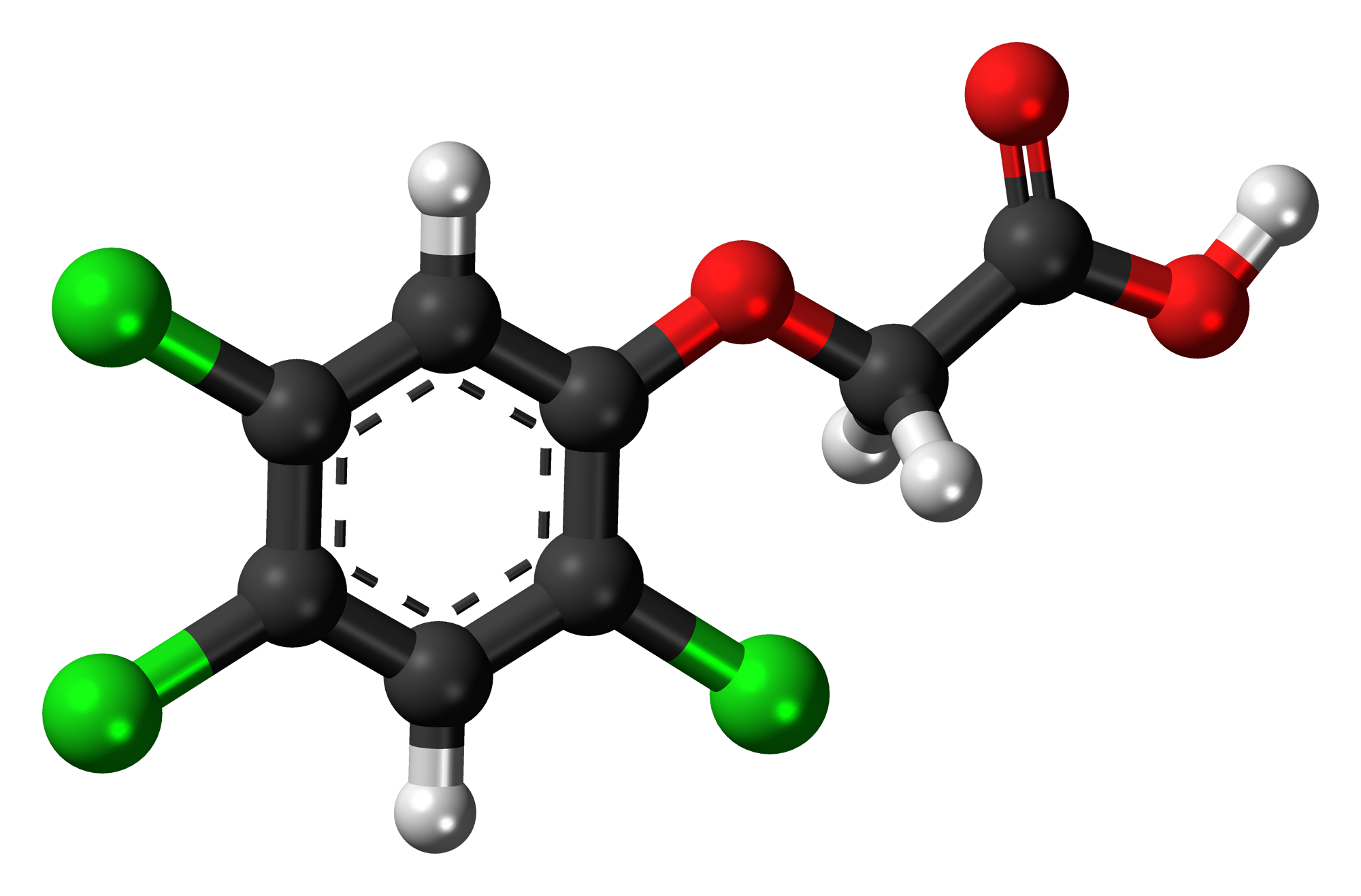

Names
- Preferred IUPAC name (2,4,5-Trichlorophenoxy)acetic acid
- Other names 2,4,5-Trichlorophenoxyacetic acid 2,4,5-T; Trioxone

Identifiers
| CAS Number | 93-76-5 |
| 3D model (JSmol) | Interactive image |
| Beilstein Reference | 2055620 |
| ChEBI | CHEBI:27903 |
| ChEMBL | ChEMBL194458 |
| ChemSpider | 1435 |
| ECHA InfoCard | 100.002.068 |
| EC Number | 202-273-3 |
| Gmelin Reference | 434052 |
| KEGG | C07100 |
| PubChem CID | 1480 |
| RTECS number | AJ8400000 |
| UNII | 9Q963S4YMX |
| UN number | 2811 3345 3348 2765 |
| CompTox Dashboard (EPA) | DTXSID5021388 |
- InChI: InChI=1S/C8H5Cl3O3/c9-4-1-6(11)7(2-5(4)10)14-3-8(12)13/h1-2H,3H2,(H,12,13) Key: SMYMJHWAQXWPDB-UHFFFAOYSA-N; InChI=1/C8H5Cl3O3/c9-4-1-6(11)7(2-5(4)10)14-3-8(12)13/h1-2H,3H2,(H,12,13) Key: SMYMJHWAQXWPDB-UHFFFAOYAR
- SMILES: Clc1cc(OCC(=O)O)c(Cl)cc1Cl

Properties
| Chemical formula | C_{8}H_{5}Cl_{3}O_{3} |
| Molar mass | 255.48 g/mol |
| Appearance | Off-white to yellow crystalline solid |
| Odor | odorless |
| Density | 1.80 g/cm^{3}, 20 °C |
| Melting point | 154 to 158 °C (309 to 316 °F; 427 to 431 K) |
| Boiling point | decomposes |
| Solubility in water | 238 mg/kg (30 °C) |
| Vapor pressure | 1×10^{−7} mmHg |

Hazards
- GHS labelling
| Pictograms | (GHS07: Exclamation mark) (GHS09: Environmental hazard) |
| Signal word | Warning |
| Hazard statements | H302, H315, H319, H335, H410 |
| Precautionary statements | P261, P264, P270, P271, P273, P280, P301+P312, P302+P352, P304+P340, P305+P351+P338, P312, P321, P330, P332+P313, P337+P313, P362, P391, P403+P233, P405, P501 |
- Lethal dose or concentration (LD, LC)
| LD_{50} (median dose) | 381 mg/kg (guinea pig, oral); 300 mg/kg (rat, oral); 425 mg/kg (hamster, oral); 242 mg/kg (mouse, oral) |
- NIOSH (US health exposure limits)
| PEL (Permissible) | TWA 10 mg/m^{3} |
| REL (Recommended) | TWA 10 mg/m^{3} |
| IDLH (Immediate danger) | 250 mg/m^{3} |

Related compounds
| Related compounds | 2,4-D auxin |
- Except where otherwise noted, data are given for materials in their standard state (at 25 °C [77 °F], 100 kPa). verify (what is ?) Infobox references

2,4,5-Trichlorophenoxyacetic acid (also known as 2,4,5-T), a synthetic auxin, is a chlorophenoxy acetic acid herbicide used to defoliate broad-leafed plants. It was developed in the late 1940s, synthesized by reaction of 2,4,5-trichlorophenol and chloroacetic acid. It was widely used in the agricultural industry until being phased out, starting in the late 1970s due to toxicity concerns, as it tends to become contaminated with dioxins. Agent Orange, a defoliant used by the British in the Malayan Emergency and the U.S. in the Vietnam War, was equal parts 2,4,5-T and 2,4-D (2,4-dichlorophenoxyacetic acid). 2,4,5-T itself is toxic with a NOAEL of 3 mg/kg/day and a LOAEL of 10 mg/kg/day. Agent Pink contained 100% 2,4,5-T (dioxin contaminates included). Additionally, the manufacturing process for 2,4,5-T contaminates this chemical with trace amounts of 2,3,7,8-tetrachlorodibenzo-p-dioxin (TCDD). TCDD is a carcinogenic persistent organic pollutant with long-term effects on the environment. With proper temperature control during production of 2,4,5-T, TCDD levels can be held to about 5 ppb. Before the TCDD risk was well understood, early production facilities lacked proper temperature controls and individual batches tested later were found to have as much as 60 ppm of TCDD.

In 1970, the United States Department of Agriculture halted the use of 2,4,5-T on all food crops except rice, and in 1985, the EPA terminated all remaining uses in the U.S. of this herbicide. In Canada, the use and sale of 2,4,5-T was prohibited after 1985. The international trade of 2,4,5-T is restricted by the Rotterdam Convention. 2,4,5-T has since largely been replaced by dicamba and triclopyr.

Human health effects from 2,4,5-T at low environmental doses or at biomonitored levels from low environmental exposures are unknown. Intentional overdoses and unintentional high dose occupational exposures to chlorophenoxy acid herbicides have resulted in weakness, headache, dizziness, nausea, abdominal pain, myotonia, hypotension, renal (kidney) and hepatic (liver) injury, and delayed neuropathy. Cometabolism of 2,4,5-T is possible to produce 3,5-dichlorocatechol, which, in turn, can be degraded by Pseudomonas bacteria. IARC considers the chlorophenoxyacetic acids group of chemicals as possibly carcinogenic to humans.

== Incidents ==
In 1963 a production vessel for 2,4,5-T exploded in the Philips-Duphar plant in the Netherlands. Six workers that cleaned up afterwards got seriously intoxicated and developed chloracne.
