= Defoliant =

Chemical sprayed or dusted on plants to cause its leaves to fall off

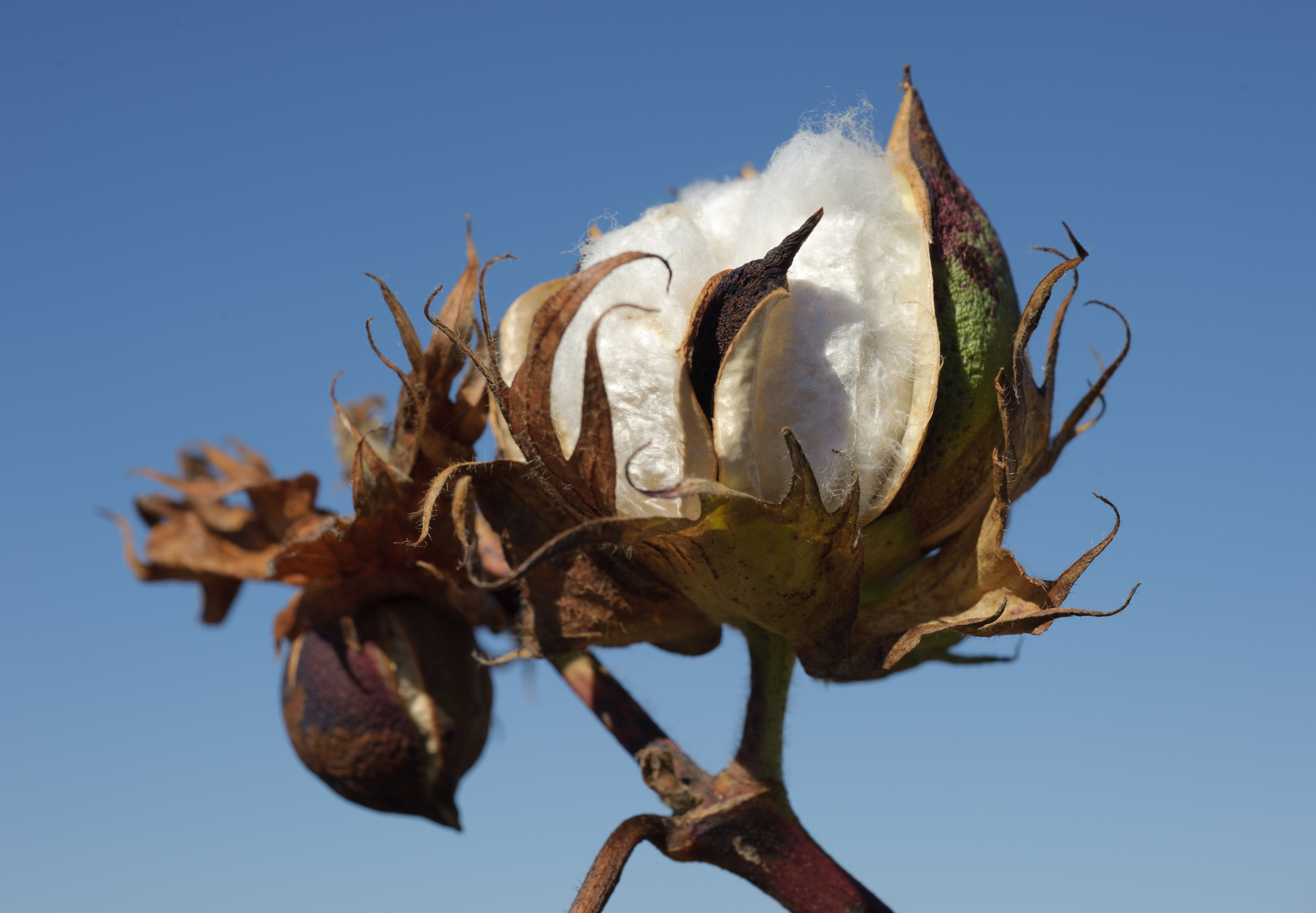
Defoliants are used as an aid in the harvesting of certain crops such as cotton.

2,4-D, one of the first chemical herbicides used as a defoliant.

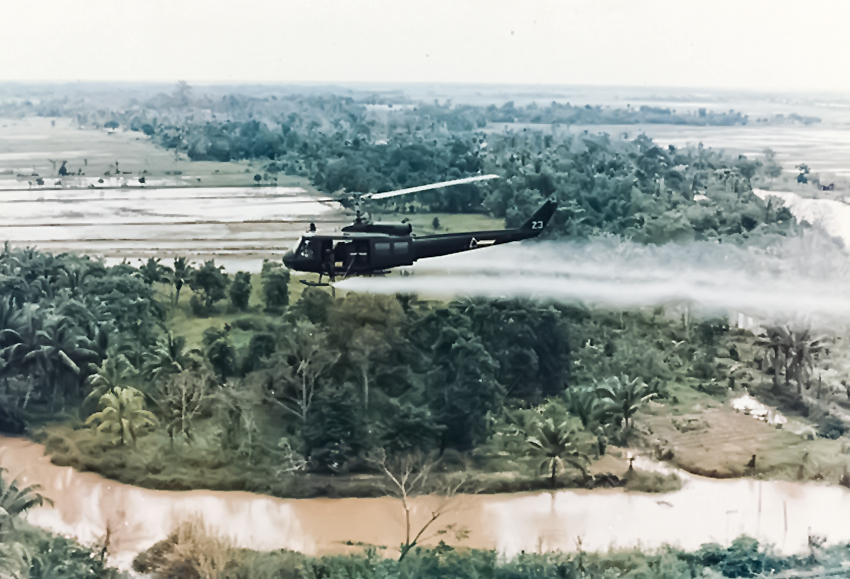
U.S. Army Huey helicopter spraying Agent Orange over agricultural land during the Vietnam War.

A defoliant is any herbicidal chemical sprayed or dusted on plants to cause their leaves to fall off. Defoliants are widely used for the selective removal of weeds in managing croplands and lawns. Worldwide use of defoliants, along with the development of other herbicides and pesticides, allowed for the Green Revolution, an increase in agricultural production in mid-20th century. Defoliants have also been used in warfare as a means to deprive an enemy of food crops and/or hiding cover, most notably by the United Kingdom during the Malayan Emergency and the United States in the Vietnam War. Defoliants were also used by Indonesian forces in various internal security operations.

== Use and application ==
A primary application of defoliants is the selective killing of plants. Two of the oldest chemical herbicides used as defoliants are 2,4-Dichlorophenoxyacetic acid (2,4-D) and 2,4,5-Trichlorophenoxyacetic acid (2,4,5-T). 2,4-D and 2,4,5-T are absorbed by broad-leafed plants, killing them by causing excessive hormonal growth. These phenoxy herbicides were designed to selectively kill weeds and unwanted plants in croplands. They were first introduced at the beginning of World War II and became widespread in use in agriculture following the end of the War.

Defoliants have a practical use in the harvesting of certain crops, particularly cotton, in the United States including a number of other cotton-producing countries. The use of defoliants aids in the efficient harvesting of cotton and finer lint quality. The effectiveness of defoliant use in cotton harvesting depends on the type of defoliant(s) used, the number of applications, the amount applied, and environmental variables. Common harvest-aiding chemical defoliants include tribufos, dimethipin, and thidiazuron. According to a 1998 report by the U.S. Department of Agriculture National Agricultural Statistics Service (NASS), tribufos and thidiazuron accounted for 60% of crop area that was treated by defoliants during that crop year.

== Examples of defoliants ==
In Southeast Asia during the Vietnam War, the Rainbow Herbicides were a group of tactical-use chemicals used by the United States military. The environmental destruction caused by this defoliation has been described by Swedish Prime Minister Olof Palme, lawyers, historians and other academics as an ecocide.

During the Vietnam War, a defoliant named Agent Orange was used during the war. Agent Orange was developed by the United States Department of Defense in conjunction with researchers from the University of Illinois, and the U.S. Army Biological Warfare Laboratories at Fort Detrick during the 1940s. The main purpose was to increase visibility during conflicts against units using guerrilla warfare.

Use of 2,4-D and 2,4,5-T (Trioxone) have also had combat applications during the Malayan Emergency.

== Health and environmental effects ==
In 1998, the U.S. Environmental Protection Agency (U.S. EPA) concluded that the use of agricultural defoliants led to increased risks of water contamination and dangers to freshwater and marine life. High doses of tribufos were labeled as a possible carcinogen and a toxin to freshwater and marine invertebrates. Dimethipin has also been labeled as a possible human carcinogen.

A published study in the Journal of Agricultural and Food Chemistry reported that through successive surface runoff events in defoliated cotton fields, defoliant concentrations decreased exponentially within the test area and could negatively affect marine life in the runoff zones.

Agent Orange, a defoliant used by the United Kingdom during the Malayan Emergency in the 1950s and the United States during the Vietnam War to defoliate regions of Vietnam from 1961 to 1971, has been linked to several long-term health issues. Agent Orange contains a mixture of 2,4-D and 2,4,5-T as well as dioxin contaminants. Members of the Air Force Ranch Hand and the Army Chemical Corps who served in the Vietnam War were occupationally exposed to Agent Orange have a higher incidence of diabetes, heart disease, hypertension, and chronic respiratory diseases.

Among other occupations, farmers are at a significantly higher risk of developing Alzheimer's disease due to a greater chance of defoliant exposure.

== See also ==
- Rainbow Herbicides
- Crop destruction
- Index of environmental articles
- Dragon drone, foliage removal via thermite
