= Deforestation in Vietnam =

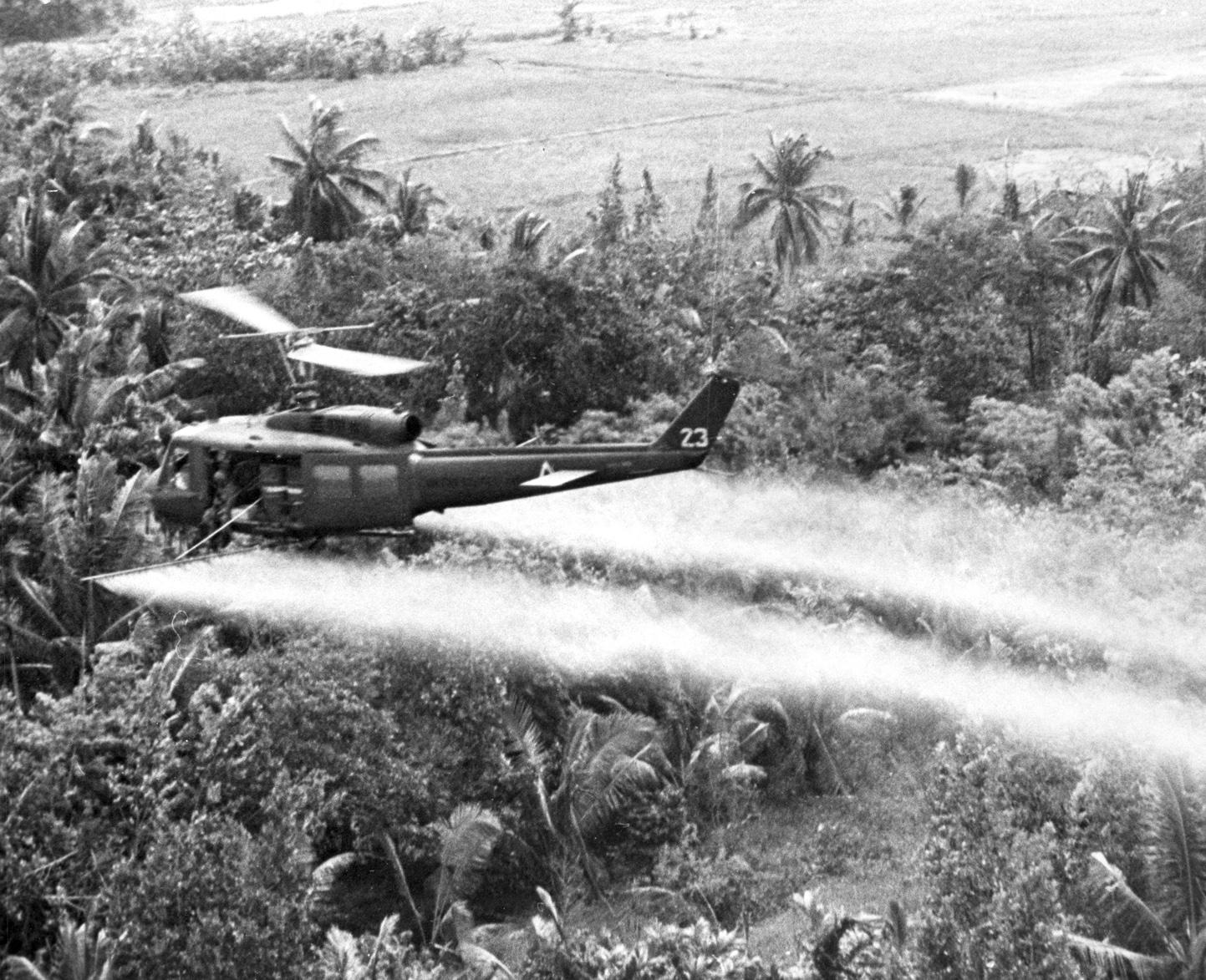
The use of Agent Orange caused significant deforestation during the Vietnam War.

According to a 2005 report conducted by the Food and Agriculture Organization of the United Nations (FAO), Vietnam has the second highest rate of deforestation of primary forests in the world, second only to Nigeria. The use of defoliants during the Vietnam War had a devastating and long-lasting impact on the country's forests and ecology, affecting 14-44% of total forest cover, with coastal mangrove forests being most affected.

The use of herbicides like Agent Orange during the war not only defoliated vast tracts of forest but also left behind long-term environmental damage, including soil contamination and disruptions to the natural regeneration of ecosystems. These effects are still felt today, particularly in areas where recovery has been slow or hindered by ongoing deforestation pressures. The war left a legacy of environmental degradation that affected not only the forests but also the communities that relied on them for resources such as food, timber, and fuel. Many communities, particularly in the central and southern regions, were displaced or forced into subsistence farming, further contributing to the degradation of the landscape. And which in present day continue to face environmental challenges.

== Shift towards forest restoration ==
However, regarding total forest cover, Vietnam has undergone a forest transition: its forest cover has increased since the early 1990s, after decades of deforestation. As of 2005, 12,931,000 hectares (the equivalent of 39.7% of Vietnam's land cover) was forested, although only 85,000 hectares (0.7% of the land cover) was primary forest, the most biodiverse form of forest.

Vietnam’s forest recovery is a notable success story, with forest cover increasing in recent decades after a period of extreme deforestation. The majority of the recovered forest is not primary, biodiverse forest but rather plantation forest, which lacks the complex ecological characteristics of natural forests. This shift from primary forest to monoculture plantations although beneficial for soil stabilization and carbon sequestration has not fully restored the environmental richness that existed before large-scale deforestation. But it has been a great towards regrowing the forest lost.

A response to the urgent need for climate change mitigation, Vietnam has chosen to adopt various strategies, including the REDD+ program, which aims to reduce emissions from deforestation and forest degradation, foster conservation, manage forests sustainably, and enhance forest carbon stocks. This program, supported by the United Nations Framework Convention on Climate Change (UNFCCC), Which is part of a broader global effort to try and tackle land use change, which contributes significantly to greenhouse gas emissions. Despite these efforts, however, forest loss and degradation persist, particularly in the north-central, northeast, and central highland regions, where forest clearing for agriculture, infrastructure development, and logging remain major concerns. The current policies in Vietnam provide a platform for the development of REDD+, and the program happens to hold great potential in reducing deforestation and forest degradation. However, the success of REDD+ in Vietnam is hindered by challenges such as limited data on the extent of forest loss and degradation, unclear drivers of deforestation, and insufficient local governance. Studies show that between 2000 and 2010, approximately 1.77 million hectares of forest were lost, while another 0.65 million hectares were degraded. These losses are often driven by a combination of economic and demographic factors, such as rising agricultural demand, population growth, poverty, and insufficient enforcement of land-use policies. A better understanding of these drivers, combined with stronger governance, is critical for ensuring the effectiveness of policies like REDD+.

== Tree cover extent and loss ==
Global Forest Watch publishes annual estimates of tree cover loss and 2000 tree cover extent derived from time-series analysis of Landsat satellite imagery in the Global Forest Change dataset. In this framework, tree cover refers to vegetation taller than 5 m (including natural forests and tree plantations), and tree cover loss is defined as the complete removal of tree cover canopy for a given year, regardless of cause.

For Vietnam, country statistics report cumulative tree cover loss of 3,687,321 ha (36,873.21 km^{2}) from 2001 to 2024 (about 22.3% of its 2000 tree cover area). For tree cover density greater than 30%, country statistics report a 2000 tree cover extent of 16,550,836 ha (165,508.36 km^{2}). The charts and table below display this data. In simple terms, the annual loss number is the area where tree cover disappeared in that year, and the extent number shows what remains of the 2000 tree cover baseline after subtracting cumulative loss. Forest regrowth is not included in the dataset.

Annual tree cover loss in Vietnam, 2001–2024. View chart definition.
Tree cover extent in 2000 minus cumulative tree cover loss in Vietnam, 2001–2024 (loss-only residual; does not account for gain). View chart definition.

Annual tree cover extent and loss
Year	Tree cover extent (km2) (Note: This residual measure does not include forest regrowth.)	Annual tree cover loss (km2)
2001	165,033.79	474.57
2002	164,537.54	496.25
2003	164,107.49	430.05
2004	163,368.66	738.83
2005	162,346.53	1,022.13
2006	161,558.71	787.82
2007	160,756.42	802.29
2008	159,673.38	1,083.04
2009	158,295.76	1,377.62
2010	156,552.93	1,742.83
2011	155,244.82	1,308.11
2012	153,432.06	1,812.76
2013	152,107.81	1,324.25
2014	149,934.55	2,173.26
2015	147,755.72	2,178.83
2016	144,221.42	3,534.30
2017	141,351.43	2,869.99
2018	139,099.66	2,251.77
2019	136,931.89	2,167.77
2020	134,855.42	2,076.47
2021	132,924.47	1,930.95
2022	131,272.97	1,651.50
2023	129,919.76	1,353.21
2024	128,635.15	1,284.61

== REDD+ forest reference level and monitoring ==
Vietnam has submitted a national forest reference emission level (FREL) and forest reference level (FRL) under the UNFCCC REDD+ framework, which underwent a UNFCCC technical assessment. On the UNFCCC REDD+ Web Platform, Vietnam’s reference level is listed as “assessed”, and the other elements of the Warsaw Framework—a national strategy/action plan, safeguards information, and a national forest monitoring system—are listed as reported.

In the modified submission used in the technical assessment, Vietnam defined forest as land with a minimum 10% tree cover, trees at least 5 metres tall, and a minimum area of 0.5 hectares (with separate thresholds for young plantations). The assessed benchmarks (average annual historical emissions and removals for the reference period 1995–2010, aligned with national forest inventory cycles) were 59,960,827 t CO2 eq per year for emissions from deforestation and forest degradation (FREL) and −39,602,735 t CO2 eq per year for removals from enhancement of forest carbon stocks (FRL). The technical assessment notes that the FRL included an adjustment reflecting the annualized effect of a national reforestation, restoration and protection programme implemented during 1998–2010.

The FREL/FRL included the above-ground and below-ground biomass pools and CO2 only, while excluding soil organic carbon and dead organic matter; non-CO2 emissions from forest fires were considered small (reported as less than 0.1% of total national emissions). Vietnam derived activity data from harmonized forest-cover maps for 1995, 2000, 2005 and 2010 (re-interpreted to apply the current forest definition) and derived emission/removal factors from plot measurements under the National Forest Inventory, Monitoring and Assessment Programme (NFIMAP).

== See also ==
- Environmental issues in Vietnam
- Environmental impact of the Vietnam War
- Impact of Agent Orange in Vietnam
- Deforestation in Laos
- Deforestation in Cambodia
