= Lighter than Orange – The Legacy of Dioxin in Vietnam =

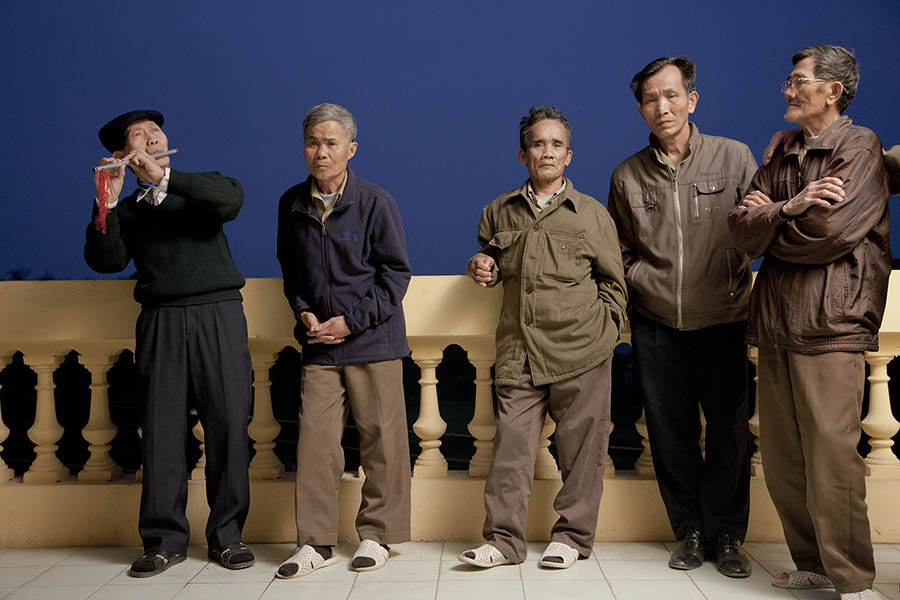
Vietnamese Veterans in the Vietnam Friendship Village, 2012

Lighter than Orange-The Legacy of Dioxin in Vietnam is a documentary by the Berlin filmmaker Matthias Leupold about the long-term consequences of American warfare in Vietnam. The film was shot in Vietnam in 2012 and has been subtitled in English, German, French, Spanish, Italian, Vietnamese and Russian. The film documents stories of Vietnamese veterans and their families who are affected by the gene damage caused by the defoliant Agent Orange. It contained 2,3,7,8-tetrachlorodibenzodioxin.

== Content ==
Many films critically report on the time of the American war in Vietnam. The biographies of the Vietnamese veterans who survived the war, but who still suffer from the consequences of the use of Agent Orange, have so far mostly been left out. The film presents the fates of former Vietnamese soldiers and lets those affected have their say who have so far received little public attention. They exemplify more than three million Agent Orange victims about their experiences and the cruel consequences for their families - consequences of political failure. Ms. Nguyễn Thị Ngọc Hạnh (volunteer in the Vietnamese Association of Agent Orange Victims in the province of Nng Nai) reports in this documentary about current new illnesses near Ho Chi Minh City / Saigon in Biên Hòa, a hot spot A place where the concentration of dioxin in the soil and waters is still particularly high today.

Aesthetically, the film corresponds to its content orientation: it lives from the reserved images of humble Vietnamese veterans and popular songs sung. The title “Lighter than Orange” is a reference to the changes in the genome brought back from the war zones by the returnees, which, unlike actual war trophies, had no weight.

A large part of the film was shot in March 2012 in the Vietnam Friendship Village, on the western outskirts of Hanoi in the formerly rural Hoài Đức district. The project was financed with private funds from Leupold Film Production Berlin and from the Stiftung Umverteilen (Stiftung für eine solidarische Welt) and the Hamburg Foundation Asienbrücke, as well as from the Technical University of Applied Sciences in Berlin. It goes back to records that Felix Klickermann made in the Village of Friendship in 2009. The Vietnamese Germanist Nhung Lương Tuyết accompanied the recording work in 2012 and took over the extensive translation work in the following years. The German-American artist and translator Julia Metzger-Traber worked on the project on a voluntary basis from 2013 to 2017. The Vietnamese title is ĐIỂM LẶNG, which means in English: ″Quiet point″.

== Selection of festival participations ==
Lighter than Orange received the Grand Prize Documentary Feature Award of SR - Socially Relevant Film Festival New York in 2015 at the Maysles Documentary Center.

Other festival participations:

- New York Independent Film Festival
- Hollywood Film Festival
- DocPoint Helsinki Documentary Film Festival
- Finow Film Festival
- Cambodia International Film Festival
- Human Rights Film Festival of Barcelona
- Justice Film Festival, Chicago
- Best Feature Documentary Los Angeles CineFest
- Filmmakers World Festival GOLD AWARD WINNER, Jakarta, Indonesia
- FilmArtFestival Mecklenburg-Pomerania
- KLECO Film Fest, Kuala Lumpur, Malaysia
- Berlin International Uranium Film Festival

== TV broadcasts ==
2015, via Deutsche Welle, worldwide: German, English, Spanish and Arabic.

== Film ==
Youtube Link to the ful film: "Lighter than Orange - The Legacy of Dioxin in Vietnam", English Subtitles, 72 min
