= Environmental issues in Vietnam =

Environmental issues in Vietnam include climate change, habitat loss and degradation, water pollution, and air pollution. Heavy pesticide use and military activities during the Vietnam War have contributed to lingering environmental damage. Vietnam's rapid industrialization following economic reforms in 1986, known as Đổi Mới, has also contributed to habitat degradation and pollution. Government action has been partially successful in addressing certain issues such as deforestation. Though environmental activism has increased since the Đổi Mới reforms, it has had more limited success.

== History ==
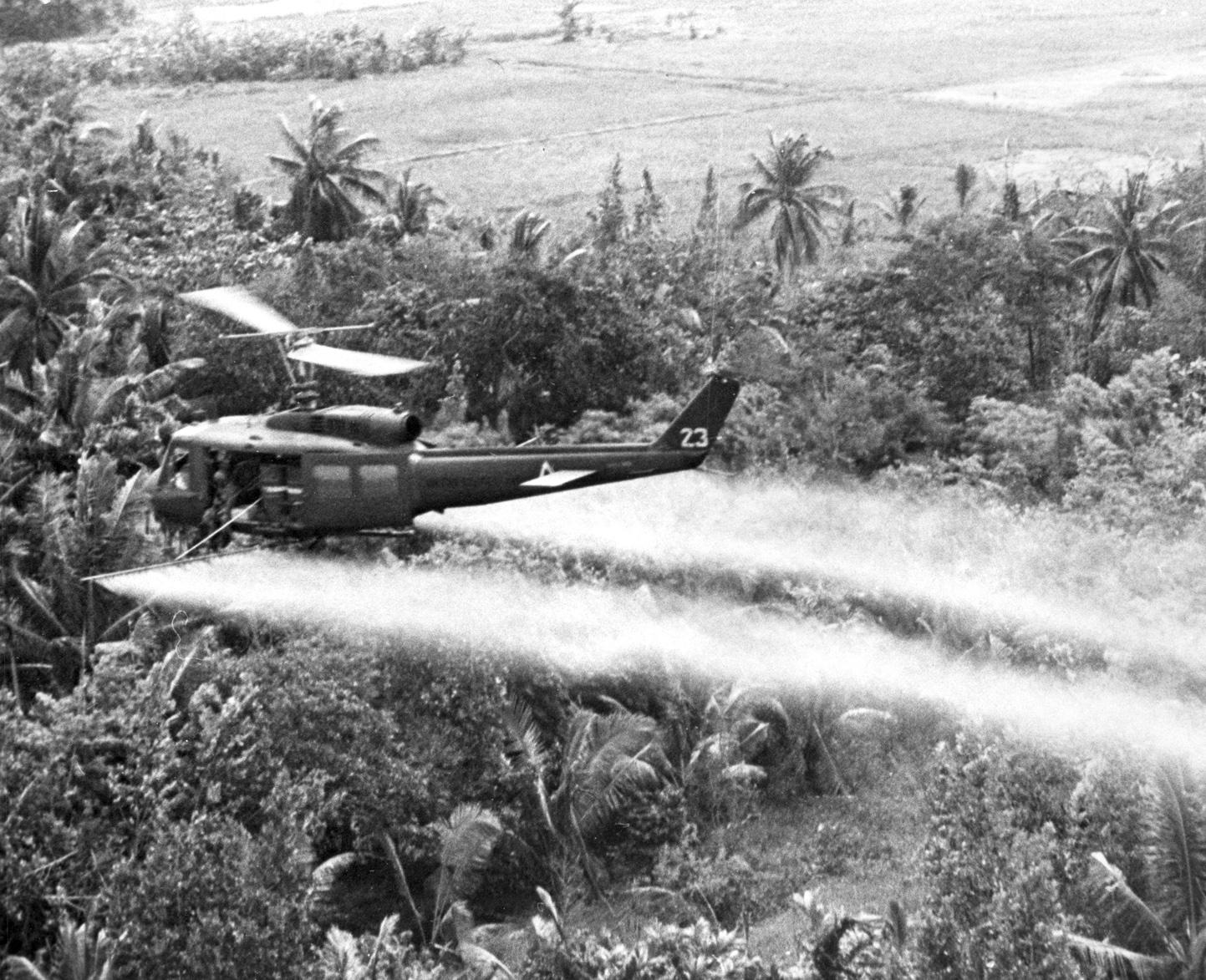
Agent Orange being sprayed in Mekong Delta during Vietnam War.

Between 1962 and 1971 during the Vietnam War, U.S. military forces dispersed more than 19 million gallons of herbicidal agents over Vietnam, including more than 11 million gallons of the dioxin-contaminant commonly known as Agent Orange. 17.8% or 3.1 million hectares (31,000 km^{2}; 12,000 sq mi) of Vietnam's total forested area was sprayed, and many of these contaminants remained in the environment for years after the war. The spraying of herbicides directly affected an estimated 2.1 million to 4.8 million people present in the region. In addition to the impact of herbicide use, the effects of the war on Vietnam's physical landscape continue to influence land-use politics today.

Industrial and economic activity in Vietnam has contributed to environmental degradation and pollution as early as the 1950s. Starting in 1986, the Đổi Mới reforms to business and agriculture significantly accelerated economic growth in Vietnam but simultaneously increased pressure on natural resources and contributed to increased pollution. A 2003 publication jointly produced by the Ministry of Agriculture and Rural Development (MONRE) and the Ministry of Fisheries found that increased demands for land development and planning frequently conflicted with area conservation plans. Additionally, the sharp increase in urban populations after Đổi Mới decreased the effectiveness of urban drainage systems, leading to heavily polluted water. Concentrations of major air pollutants like PM2.5 and NO_{2} have also increased across Vietnam since 2001, particularly in major cities like Hanoi and Hai Phong.

== Climate change ==
Vietnam has been consistently ranked as one of the countries most affected by climate change. Its long coastline, low-lying river delta areas, and position near the South China Sea make it especially vulnerable to consequences of climate change like rising sea levels and extreme weather events such as typhoons. Rising sea levels and more extreme weather may contribute to increased river and coastal flooding in heavily populated areas. In 2025, Vietnam experienced extensive flooding and heavy rainfall that experts attributed in part to climate change. A 2020 estimate by the World Bank and the Asian Development Bank suggested an additional 3 to 10 million people in Vietnam could be affected by intensified river flooding due to climate change between 2035 and 2040. The estimate also suggested 6 to 12 million people could be affected annually by coastal flooding between 2070 and 2100 due to continued greenhouse gas emissions.

An additional consequence of climate change is increased temperatures. Since 1960, Vietnam's average annual temperature has increased by an estimated 0.5 to 0.7 °C, a rate faster than the global rate of increase. The average annual temperature is projected to increase such that by 2080, it will be 1 to 3.4 °C above the baseline temperature from 1985 to 2005. Given Vietnam's already high baseline temperatures, further increases could lead to chronic heat stress especially in urban areas like Hanoi and Ho Chi Minh City. Studies suggest that rising temperatures in Vietnam are linked to increased hospitalizations and all-cause mortality. Warmer temperatures are also correlated with increased incidence of diseases like dengue or malaria.

== Habitat loss ==
All three of Vietnam's major ecosystems—forest, wetlands, and marine ecosystems—have degraded in size and/or quality in the past few decades. Ecosystem decline has frequently been linked to anthropogenic pressures such as urbanization, pollution, population growth, expansion of agriculture and aquaculture, and overexploitation of natural resources.

Deforestation occurred rapidly in the latter part of the 20th century due to widespread use of Agent Orange, a defoliating agent, on Vietnam's southern forests during the Vietnam War, in addition to domestic forest degradation as the country rebuilt after the war. Forest cover decreased from about 43% in the early 1940s to 17% by the end of the 1970s, with some foreign analysts estimating forest cover was as low as 10% by 1999. However, in the 21st century, Vietnam has shifted towards net reforestation, achieving 42% forest cover by 2020. Despite the increase in forest cover, however, the quality of forests remains low. A 2018 survey of global forest landscape integrity ranked Vietnam 104th out of 172 countries, with a mean forest landscape integrity index of 5.35/10. Additionally, the increase in forest cover is mainly driven by plantation forests rather than natural forests, which is not as beneficial for preserving biodiversity and protecting watersheds. Deforestation and forest degradation are still continuing despite reforestation efforts, as well; between 2001 and 2024, Vietnam lost 3.7 million hectares of forest cover according to estimates from the Global Forest Watch.

Key wetland ecosystems, mangrove forests, decreased in area by 80% from 408,500 hectares to 83,288 hectares between 1943 and 2003, though the downward trend has since been reversed due to successful restoration policies. By 2017, mangrove forest cover had increased to a little over 160,000 hectares.

The number of lakes around Hanoi has decreased significantly since the beginning of the 19th century. Inland wetlands like lakes, reservoirs, rivers, and estuarine areas have also experienced decreases in biodiversity due to rapid urbanization and industrialization—including the construction of dams, canals, or dykes—as well as pollution from untreated domestic and industrial wastewater.

In the past two decades, Vietnam's overall coastal seagrass area has decreased by 45.4%, with certain seagrass beds decreasing by 60% in size since 1999. Vietnam's coral reefs, which are closely intertwined with seagrass habitats, are also at risk. In 2008, fewer than 1% of Vietnam's coral reefs had a live coral coverage of over 75%, while 31% of reefs had less 25% live coral coverage. More recent assessments also suggest that the majority of Vietnam's coral reefs are in a degraded condition. Even though the government has established 27 marine protected areas to preserve reefs, substantial coral loss has been observed. Between 2002 and 2024, 191 hectares of coral reefs were lost in the Nha Trang Bay marine protected area. Key causes of reef and seagrass degradation include climate change; pollution from aquaculture or other urban, industrial, or agricultural sources; coastal development; destructive fishing; and for coral reefs specifically, outbreaks of disease or predators such as starfish.

== Water pollution ==
Vietnam is ranked as the fourth in the world for waste mismanagement and generates approximately 280,000 to 730,000 metric tons of plastic leakage annually. Mangrove ecosystems, dunes, and subsoil have become sinks for coastal plastic litter. Seagrass meadows and deep oceans have become basins of marine plastic debris.

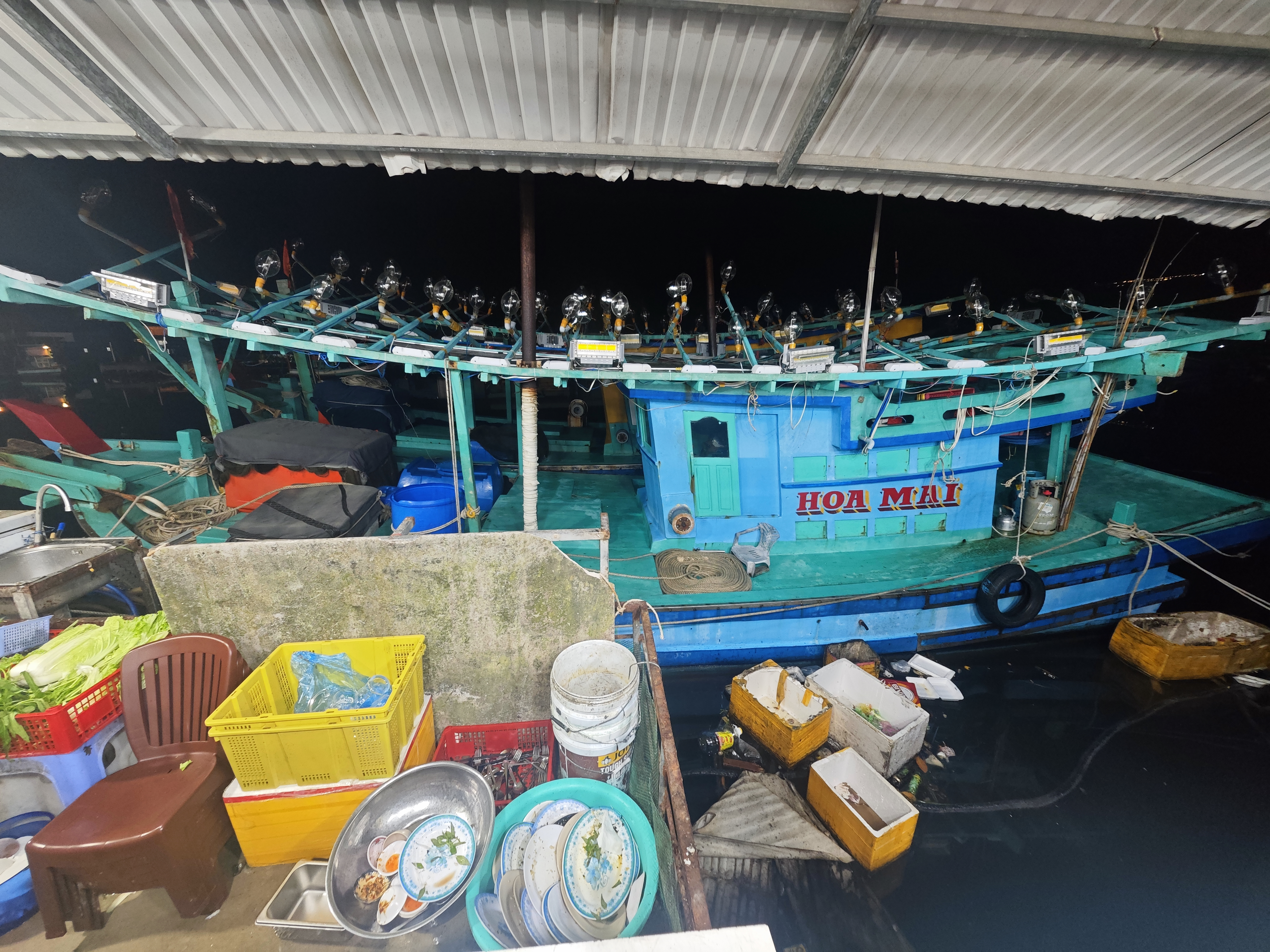
Floating rubbish next to a boat

In addition to plastic, waste water also pollutes waters. Every year, Vietnam generates approximately 13 million tons of waste. The country's primary form of urban waste management is through landfill. Yet, only a small portion of the country has landfills with hygienic construction. Even so, the hygienic construction still doesn't meet standards to prevent water pollution. In addition, waste water is released into drainage systems and rivers without being treated, furthering pollution. This is due to urban sewage systems lacking centralized wastewater treatment facilities.

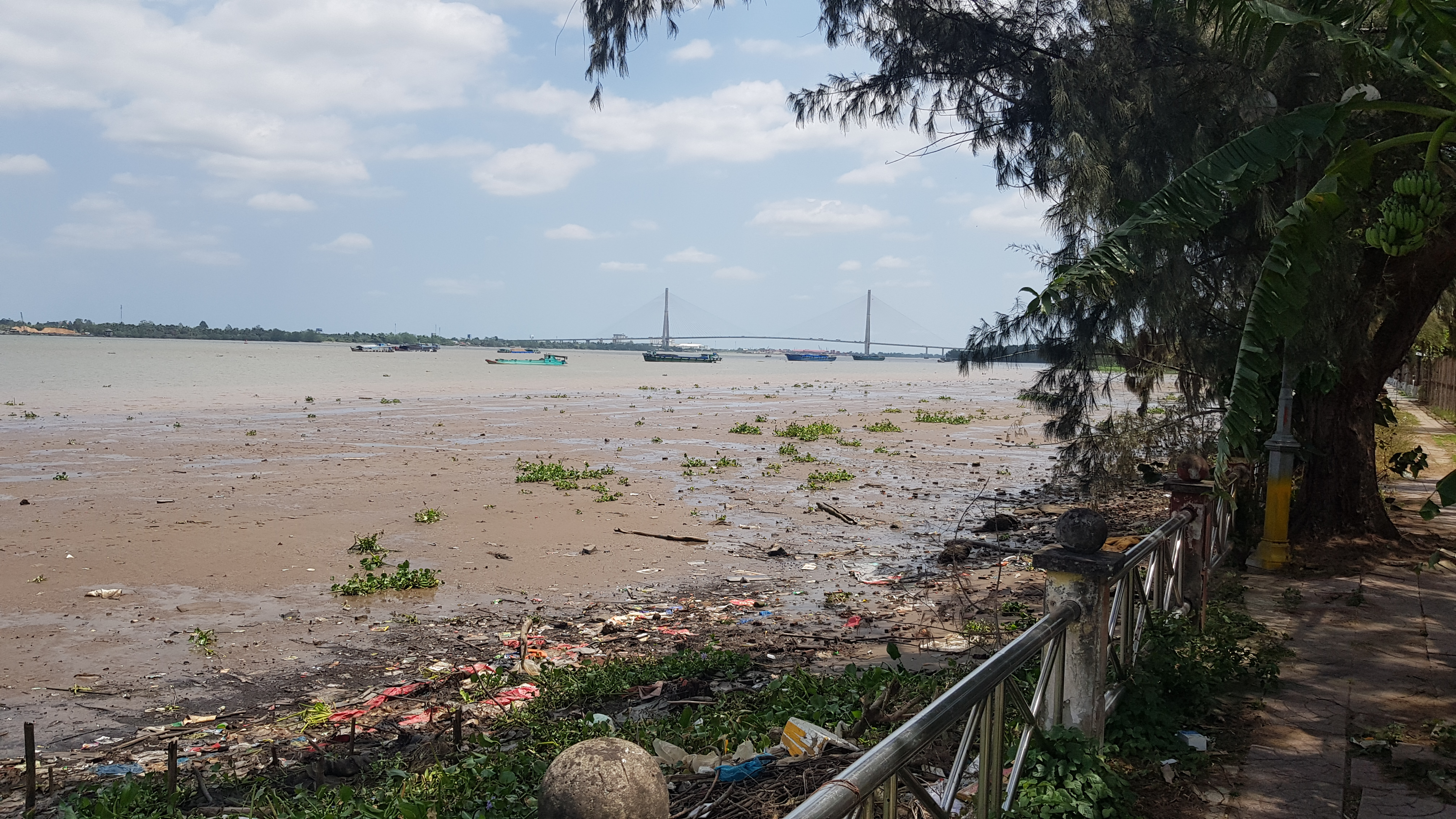
Polluted water in the Mekong Delta

Lingering effects of the Vietnam War have also affected water quality. Agent Orange was sprayed in large amounts during the Vietnam War to kill jungle flora that acted as coverage for Vietnamese military forces. But, the chemical has had long term health effects as it contains a toxin called dioxin, which causes cancer and birth defects. Over the years, dioxin-contaminated soil has blown and spread dioxin. Additionally, dioxin has found its way into waterways due to heavy and lingering rains. This has led to contamination of animals and fish.

=== 2016 Vietnam marine environment disaster ===
In April 2016, the 2016 Vietnam marine environmental disaster surfaced due to the illegal discharging of toxic industrial waste into the ocean near the coast of Central Vietnam by a steel plant (Formosa Ha Tinh Steel) owned by a Taiwanese corporation (Formosa Plastics), which affected Hà Tĩnh, Quảng Bình, Quảng Trị and Thừa Thiên–Huế provinces. Fish carcasses were reported to have washed up on the beaches of Hà Tĩnh province from at least 6 April 2016. Later, a large number of dead fish were found on the coast of Hà Tĩnh and three other provinces (Quảng Bình, Quảng Trị and Thừa Thiên–Huế) until 18 April 2016.

Although Formosa denied being responsible, protests in April and May 2016 by ordinary Vietnamese citizens, not all of whom were necessarily directly or personally affected by the disaster, were successful in pressuring authorities to levy penalties after the company was found to be responsible on June 30, 2016, and compensations were disbursed to affected parties accordingly.

=== Accessibility to clean water ===
Vietnamese citizens generally have high levels of freshwater accessibility, although there is some variability between larger and smaller cities, and between cities and rural areas. Tap water is a readily available water supply in large cities such as Ho Chi Minh City and Hanoi. However, in rural areas, hand-dug wells remain the most important source of water as 39%-44% still rely on it. Only 10% of the rural population is supplied with piped water. Like air pollution, water pollution levels are also increasing due to increased industrial activity, especially in the Mekong Delta. In a region where most people depend on the surface water of the river, this environmental issue has had human health consequences, such as high rates of diarrhea. Overall in Vietnam, the number of reported diarrhea diseases was 296000 in total in 2009. Other examples of waterborne diseases in Vietnam include cholera, typhoid fever, dysentery, and hepatitis A. Reported cases of cholera is still significantly high. Caused by drinking water contaminated by bacterium, the number of reported cholera is well above 500, reaching 1900 in 2007, and 600 in 2010. However, the fatality rate of cholera has been close to 0% since 1999.

== Air pollution ==
Vietnam has faced persistent air pollution issues, with PM2.5 concentrations remaining far above international health standards throughout the past decade. Data from Hanoi reflects the severity of the problem, with annual average PM2.5 concentrations never approaching the World Health Organization (WHO) air quality guideline of 5 μg/m³ at any point between 2011 and 2020. The COVID-19 pandemic offered only a temporary reprieve, with PM2.5 falling to its lowest level since 2012 in 2020 before returning to pre-pandemic levels by 2023, with a 9% increase in concentrations averaging nearly six times the WHO recommended level. By 2025, Vietnam ranked as the 18th worst country for air quality globally, with a national average PM2.5 concentration of 29.7 μg/m³, nearly six times the WHO recommended annual guideline, and Hanoi remaining the most polluted city in the country with an annual average of 46.9 μg/m³ in 2019, more than nine times the WHO guideline.

Red River Delta in Vietnam

Provinces in the Red River Delta such as Bac Ninh and Hung Yen consistently recorded annual PM2.5 concentrations exceeding those of Ho Chi Minh City, and in 2020, all 10 provinces that exceeded Vietnam's own national standard of 25 μg/m³ were located in the north of the country, many of them mid-sized industrial provinces.

Vietnam's air pollution draws from many sources. Vehicles and industries dominate in cities, while biomass burning, agricultural fires, and construction dust are widespread across the country. In Hanoi, dense traffic, widespread burning of honeycomb coal briquettes for cooking and heating, and surrounding industrial zones have kept the city's PM2.5 levels elevated, with coal alone accounting for around 72% of Vietnam's total CO₂ emissions from fuel combustion by 2021. Northern provinces like Hai Duong, Thai Binh, and Bac Ninh are home to clusters of thermal power plants, cement factories, and traditional craft villages that burn diverse materials with little to no emission controls. Transboundary emissions from neighboring countries compound the problem during colder winter months, worsening an already critical situation in the Red River Delta.

Indoor air pollution has also been identified as a serious concern, particularly for children in urban areas. A large survey in Ho Chi Minh City found that exposure to secondhand smoke and polluting cooking fuels was associated with higher rates of respiratory symptoms such as wheezing, sneezing, and runny noses.

One possible way to address this air pollution is through the development of renewable energy solutions such as solar and wind power which have the potential to reduce air pollution. Furthermore, citizens' demands for action on air pollution are an important factor in the government's choice to reduce emissions.

== Pesticide misuse ==
Despite larger quantities of pesticides being sold in developed countries, pesticide-related poisonings occur more frequently in developing countries such as Vietnam. In the case of Vietnam, since the Đổi Mới economic transformation in 1986, pesticide use has doubled in the 1990s– totaling over 40,000 tons in 1998. Despite this rapid increase in the use of pesticides, the regulatory aspects of pesticides have failed to keep pace with the growth of pesticide use: a survey conducted by the Vietnam's Plant Protection Department in 2000 indicated that numerous pesticide retailers were operating without a business license or sold pesticides that failed to meet domestic safety requirements. The lack of regulation and enforcement regarding pesticide use has led to farmer carelessness, ultimately leading to a variety of public health and environmental issues. For instance, a study conducted in the Red Delta River region of Hanoi indicated that farmers were concocting pesticide cocktails or using inappropriate levels of pesticides in order to conserve capital and labor; concocting "pesticide cocktails" can alter the properties of the pesticides by making the solution ineffective or more toxic and can lead to high levels of pesticide residues in crops.

Another environmental concern is the improper disposal of pesticide waste. According to a survey result of 60 farmers in Hanoi, 17% of the surveyed farmers disposed pesticide waste in garbage bins or pits and another 17% collected the waste in batches and disposed them into the garbage. Most of the pesticides used in Vietnam are rarely biodegradable and often not biodegradable at all. Consequently, there currently is increasing concern regarding infiltration of pesticides into public water resources in Vietnam. Currently, there is increasing public effort and awareness into better pesticide management; efforts include but are not limited to introducing frameworks such as the Vietnam National Integrated Pest Management Program and Farmer Field School.

== Government policy ==
The government organization responsible for environmental issues in Vietnam is the Vietnamese Environment Administration (VEA). It was established by the Prime Minister in 2008. In addition, there are two other government bodies that aid in environmental tasks, called the Ministry of Natural Resources and Environment (MoNRE) and the Department of Natural Resources and Environment (DoNRE). MoNRE is primarily responsible for environmental policy, enforcement, and regulation in Vietnam. Their focus is on creating policies to protect the environment, supporting climate change adaptation, allocating land, conserving natural resources, and managing water resources. DoNRE is responsible for ensuring that policy is followed on a smaller, more local scale. They aid in enforcing environmental laws, land planning, sustainability education, and environmental impact assessments.

A large number of environmental regulations have been issued since the country's economic reform in the 1990s. The regulations include the Law on Environmental Protection, first issued in 1993, and revised in 2005, 2012, and 2020. Political wishes of international integration and increasing public demand for cleaner environment have been key drivers for Vietnam's environmental policy.

In 2016, the Prime Minister passed a National Action Plan on Air Quality Management. This plan was passed for better air quality management for the next four years, but targeted the next nine. The plan aimed to reduce NO_{X} and SO_{X} along with particulates from cement, chemicals, fertilizer, and petroleum facilities by 20%. Additionally, it banned charcoal stove use in urban areas, boosted monitoring of industrial emissions, created enforcement for particulates on construction sites and from transport trucks, and regulated vehicle emission standards.

Regarding waste, the National Plastic Action Partnership Vietnam (NPAP) created three pillars to help with waste and pollution reduction in Vietnam. They also identified six areas of focus: "policy, finance, transforming behavior, enhancing innovation, harmonizing metrics, and endorsing equity and inclusivity." Through working with NPAP, by 2030, the Vietnamese government will flow 75% less plastic waste into the ocean. In addition, single-use plastic materials have been banned in Vietnam.

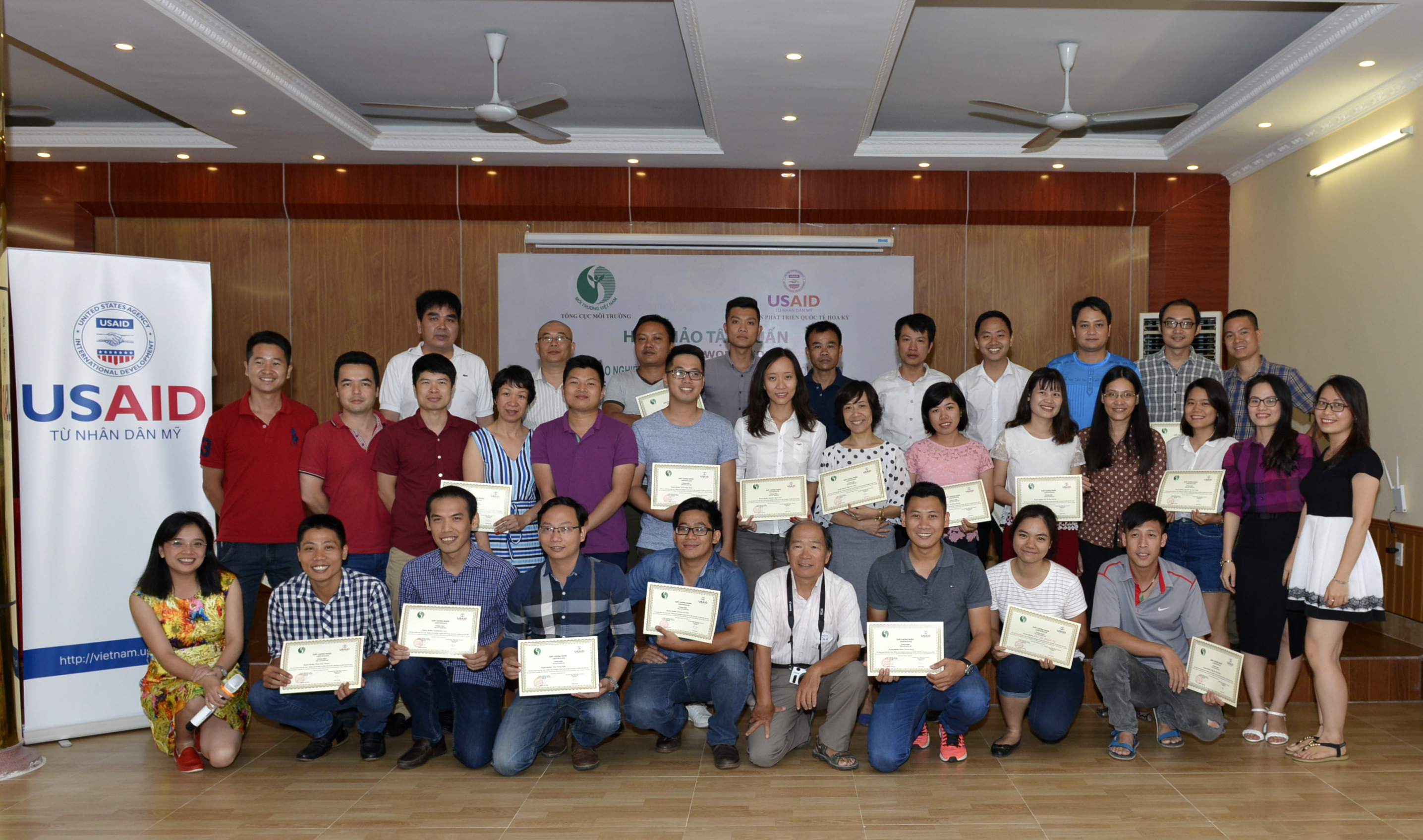
Media training on environment and climate change in Vietnam with USAID.

Additionally, Agent Orange cleanup efforts have continued in collaboration with governmental and civic organizations in the United States such as USAID and the Ford Foundation. Since the mid-2000s, U.S. Presidents have been sending aid to Vietnam to help clean up various sites, including the Bien Hoa air base.

Vietnam is committed to multilateral environmental agreements, including those on climate change and biodiversity, including the EU-Vietnam Free Trade Agreement and Investment Protection Agreement. To comply with these commitments, Vietnam would need to strengthen regulations and enforcement on the illegal wildlife trade, as well as illegal, unregulated and unreported fishing practices, to enable Vietnam to fully reap the "benefits" from "free" trade.

== Environmental activism ==
Environmental activism in Vietnam is relatively new. Prior to the Doi Moi reforms, environmental concerns were not very prominent in public discourse. This has been attributed in part to widespread poverty in Vietnam before the 1990s, which may have encouraged the population to prioritize economic concerns over environmental ones.

Since the Đổi Mới reforms, citizens have organized around environmental issues through protests, petitions, and civic movements. There have been more than 13 major environmental protests involving hundreds or thousands of protestors since 2013. Following the illegal toxic waste discharge by Formosa Ha Tinh Steel into Vietnam's central coastline in 2016, citizens staged nationwide protests, mobilizing through Facebook and religious leadership through the viral #IChooseFish campaign to demand government transparency and accountability. Though met with state repression, the protests pressured the government to formally investigate and secure a $500 million compensation settlement from the company; however, this fell short of adequately compensating affected fishing communities. Citizens have also mobilized around conservation issues, such as opposing a proposed cable car through Hang Sơn Đoòng, the world's largest cave by volume.

Environmental activism has been constrained by the government. Several prominent environmental figures, such as leaders of the climate change movement and the executive director for an energy research think tank, have been detained in recent years. The government also heavily repressed protests against the 2016 marine disaster by arresting protestors.

=== 2007 anti-bauxite environmental movement ===
During the 2007 anti-bauxite movement, citizens spoke out against mining in the Central Highlands using online petitions. Though the protests were ultimately unsuccessful in preventing mining, they forced the government to review the project.

As mentioned earlier, the anti-bauxite environmental movement in Vietnam in 2007 has been understood in various ways, including as an example of Vietnamese people speaking out about an environmental issue they care about in a socialist authoritarian context, and an instance where bottom-up community pressures had limited success in addressing the status quo. Another way it has been made sense of is as a new mode of political contestation and compromise between the environmental movement and the party-state. Although historians generally agree that the movement may not have had much success in stopping bauxite mining in the Central Highlands, it did manage to resist the attempted repressions of public discourse about the mining projects.

=== Non-governmental organizations ===
WildAct: WildAct is a non-governmental organization in Vietnam, founded in 2013 by Ms. Nguyen Thi Thu Trang. WildAct has nature conservation activities through education and information dissemination to raise awareness of Vietnamese people.

CHANGE: Created in 2013 in Vietnam, is a non-governmental organization that works to "rescue the environment" through creative, colorful communication campaigns, suitable to people's interests such as exhibitions, organizing paintings, and creating viral clips.

WWF Vietnam: A branch of the World Wide Fund for Nature is currently focusing on four main areas: preserving biodiversity in landscapes, responding to climate change, developing sustainable hydropower, and improving operational efficiency of areas. conserve.

== See also ==
- Deforestation in Vietnam
- Environmental impact of coffee production in Vietnam
- Environmental impact of the Vietnam War
- Operation Ranch Hand
- 2016 Vietnam marine life disaster
