= Vietnam Friendship Village =

The Vietnam Friendship Village is a residency founded in 1992 by George Mizo, an American veteran of the Vietnam War. The institution serves individuals afflicted by conditions related to Agent Orange while also opening channels of cross-cultural dialogue. Originally conceived of as a residence for children and elderly people presumed to be victims of Agent Orange, the focus of the village has broadened, and it now provides a variety of services such as alternative health treatments, food grown in an onsite garden, and vocational training.

The Vietnam Friendship Village's structure and organisation is done by the Veterans Association of Vietnam, and is supported by a global network of donors and volunteers. With active fundraising branches in the United States, Vietnam, Germany, and France, the organization draws on international support to fund projects and day-to-day operations of the main residency in Hanoi, Vietnam.

== History and progress ==
In 1984, American Vietnam War veterans who had been exposed to dioxin, a carcinogen found in the herbicide Agent Orange, one of many toxic substances sprayed by the US military in Southern Vietnam, won a $180 million lawsuit against the chemicals’ manufacturers, citing wrongful injury to thousands of veterans and their families. A fund was created to help compensate troops for health problems believed to be caused by exposure to these toxins. Although the Vietnam Red Cross estimates that 3 million Vietnamese people have been affected by Agent Orange, including 150,000 children born with birth defects, no funding was provided to ease its impact on Vietnamese victims.

The Vietnam Friendship Village Project was instituted in 1988 by US American veteran George Mizo, beginning as a personal mission of reparation and reconciliation for the part he played in the Vietnam War and the effects of Agent Orange on the Vietnamese People.

Initially intended as a residential facility in Vietnam with education, health, and rehabilitation services capable of caring for up to 250 children and 100 adults, the facility also became a place of reconciliation between Vietnam and the United States and its allies.

Today, the Vietnam Friendship Village provides a home to approximately 120 children with a variety of mental and physical disabilities believed to be caused by Agent Orange. The children, ages ranging between 6 and 20, receive special education, medical care, vocational training, and physical therapy. Volunteers equip them with life skills meant to help them reintegrate into their communities as members of the workforce. The village also provides support and education to approximately 1000 Vietnamese veterans annually and helps them improve their health through medical treatment. As part of their mission of reconciliation between nations, Vietnam Friendship Village connects veterans, American and Vietnamese, through rehabilitation and volunteer projects, uniting former foes with a common goal of peace.

== In media and popular culture ==
The Vietnam Friendship Village has been featured in several documentaries and TV programs about Vietnam and the lasting impact of Agent Orange.

The German award-winning documentary „Das Dorf der Freundschaft“, created by Timo Mugele and Marcus Niehaves in 2000, was one of the first films showing the story of George Mizo and the beginning of the Friendship Village. The Friendship Village was a focus of Matthias Leupold's documentary, "Lighter than Orange." The village was also the subject of Michelle Mason's award-winning documentary, "The Friendship Village," which outlines George Mizo's story, the process that led to the creation of the village, and the vision and potential of the project.

As part of a story on the peaceful collaboration between the United States and Vietnam, PBS interviewed a supporter of the village project

In 2009, a segment in “Through Their Eyes” featured the Friendship Village in Hanoi, showcasing the efforts in rehabilitation and integration of Agent Orange victims into mainstream society.

In 2018, Bowdoin College organized a student visit to the Friendship Village in Hanoi as part of their Alternative break program

== See also ==
- United States-Vietnam relations
