= George Mizo =

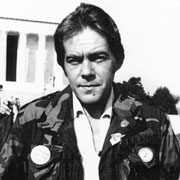
- Born: October 21, 1945; Waltham, Massachusetts
- Died: March 18, 2002 (aged 56); Germany
- Organization: Vietnam Friendship Village
- Movement: Veterans for Peace
- Awards: Purple Heart, Silver Star, Vietnam Medal of Friendship.

George Mizo (October 21, 1945 – March 18, 2002) was an American activist, veteran, and founder of the Vietnam Friendship Village in Hanoi, Vietnam. The institution serves individuals afflicted by conditions related to Agent Orange while also opening channels of cross-cultural dialogue.

== Early life ==
Born into a working-class family on October 21, 1945, in Waltham, Massachusetts, George was the son of a Blackfoot Sioux father and Irish-American mother. Before contracting Lou Gehrig's disease, his father worked for Raytheon, a U.S. defense contractor. In Autumn of 1963, George joined the U.S. Army, where he served until 1966. After the end of his first stint in the army, and due to the growing effort in Vietnam, Mizo chose to re-enlist with the intent of serving in the conflict.

== Activism ==
While recuperating in a Seattle military hospital, Mizo learned that his entire platoon had fallen in the Tet Offensive. After receiving this information, Mizo broke with the U.S. Army. Opting not to return to the war, he was court martialed and served two and a half years in prison before ultimately receiving a dishonorable discharge.

In 1986, Mizo joined fellow war veterans Charles Liteky, S. Brian Wilson, and Duncan Murphy in the Veterans Fast for Life. Advocating for change in U.S. policy in Latin America, the group fasted on the steps of the United States Capitol for 46 days and renounced the medals they received for their prior military service. When their fast came to a close on October 10, The New York Times described Mizo as ″...closer to death. He [George Mizo] has lost 45 pounds, 25 percent of his body weight. And because of a respiratory infection, he says, the doctor has told him he will slip away in five or six days. His muscles are contracting as they atrophy, and at night, he said, I wake up with agonizing cramps all up and down my legs.″ One month after their fast, the Iran-Contra Scandal broke.

== Vietnam Friendship Village ==
Following the Veterans Fast for Life and revelations regarding the harmful effects of Agent Orange on veterans of all sides of the war, Mizo turned to reconciliation in Vietnam. Originally planning to construct a peace pagoda, Mizo instead began work on the Vietnam Friendship Village.

The village now accommodates upwards of 120 individuals offering residency, education, vocational training, and physical therapy. In addition to their work with children, the Friendship Village also works directly with veterans, offering health services, education, and opportunities for cross-cultural dialogue.

Today, the Vietnam Friendship Village is supported by a global network of donors and volunteers. Numerous fundraising committees for the village exist throughout the world, including, the United States, Vietnam, Germany, and France. The organization draws on this international support to fund projects and day-to-day operations of the main residency in Hanoi, Vietnam.

== In media ==
George Mizo has been featured in a number of stories on anti-war activism and the aftermath of the Vietnam War.

At the end of their fast on the steps of the Capitol building, Mizo and his fellow protestors appeared on the Phil Donahue Show to discuss their activism.

As part of a story on the peaceful collaboration between the United States and Vietnam, PBS interviewed a supporter of the village project and Mizo's vision of reconciliation.

George Mizo and the Vietnam Friendship Village were the focus of Michelle Mason's award-winning documentary, "The Friendship Village," which outlines Mizo's story, the process that led to the creation of the village, and the vision and potential of the project.

Mizo and The Friendship Village were also a focus of Matthias Leupold's documentary, "Lighter than Orange."

== Personal life ==
Mizo met his wife, Rosemarie Höhn-Mizo, during a German peace march in 1986. Later that year, she joined him in Washington, D.C., to support his fast. Following the fast, George and Rosemarie returned to Germany, where she gave birth to their son, Michael. Today, Rosemarie is the head of the German Friendship Village Committee.

On March 18, 2002, George Mizo died from complications related to Agent Orange.

== See also ==
- List of non-governmental organizations in Vietnam
- United States-Vietnam relations
