= Veterans Fast for Life =

The Veterans Fast for Life was a water-only fast that lasted from September 1 to October 17, 1986 on the steps of the United States Capitol, Washington, D.C., as a protest against the U.S. policies in Central America (see Contra wars). Charles Liteky, former Army Chaplain, Vietnam veteran and recipient of the Medal of Honor, George Mizo, Vietnam veteran, Duncan Murphy, World War II veteran, and S. Brian Willson, Vietnam veteran, participated in the fast. Before embarking on the fast, Charles Liteky renounced in July 1986 his Medal of Honor in protest against the U.S. policies in Central America.

Charles Liteky and George Mizo started the fast on September 1, 1986, whereas Duncan Murphy and Brian Willson started on September 15, 1986. By the end of September, people were rallying to support the veterans. On October 15, 1986, the veterans appeared on The Phil Donahue Show. The fast ended on October 17, 1986 when the four veterans decided that the fast had been sufficiently successful in raising awareness of the public and escalating opposition to Ronald Reagan's policies. "By this time, there had been five hundred documented actions around the country in solidarity with the fast".

Various U.S. senators and members of the House of Representatives expressed support for the then ongoing fast, including Tom Harkin, Charles Mathias, Robert J. Mrazek, Patrick Leahy (who inserted a statement into the Congressional Record to support the fast) and John Kerry in September 1986, and thirteen senators and seventy-five members of the House of Representatives issued a supportive joint public statement on October 7, 1986. In contrast, on October 11, 1986, Senator Warren Rudman likened the four fasting veterans to terrorists.

Shortly thereafter, in late 1986, the FBI initiated a "terrorism" investigation of the activities of the Plowshares group (who jammed the locks of eleven military recruitment stations in Chicago on October 29, 1986) and, at the same time, those of the Veterans Fast for Life peace group, an investigation which FBI agent John C. "Jack" Ryan refused to conduct, being notably "convinced of the totally non-violent posture of the [Veterans Fast for Life group]". Jack Ryan was fired for refusing to conduct the investigation.
