= Đồng Lộc Junction =

Historic junction in Vietnam

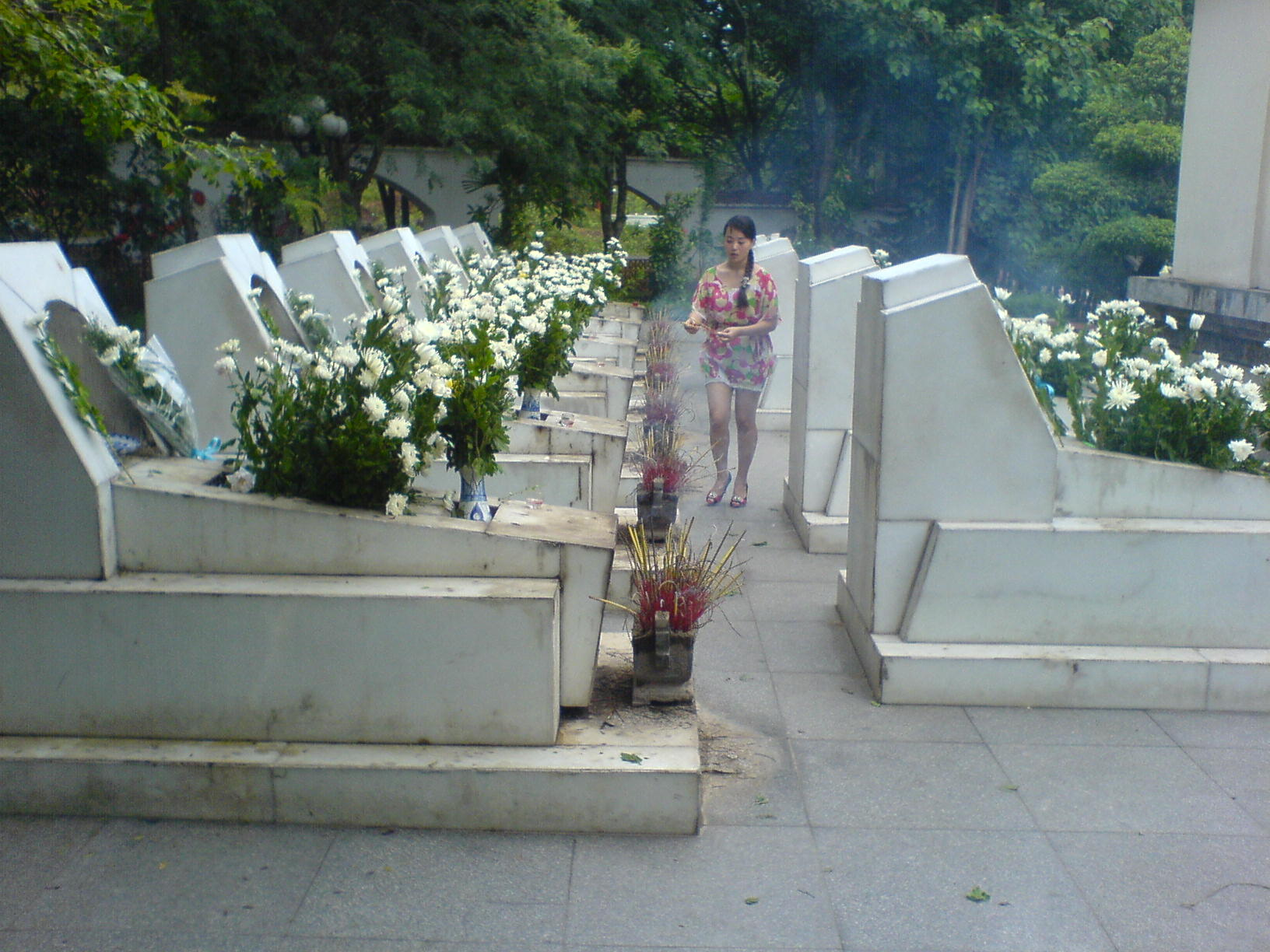
Cemetery for ten girls who volunteered for logistical activities, who died in a B-52 raid at Đồng Lộc Junction, a strategic junction along the Ho Chi Minh trail

Đồng Lộc Junction (Vietnamese: ngã ba Đồng Lộc) was a strategic road T-junction at the beginning of the Ho Chi Minh trail which was extensively bombed by American forces during the Vietnam War. Although it is often referred to as a "crossroads" in English sources, a crossroads is ngã tư (4-junction), whereas a T-junction is ngã ba (3-junction).

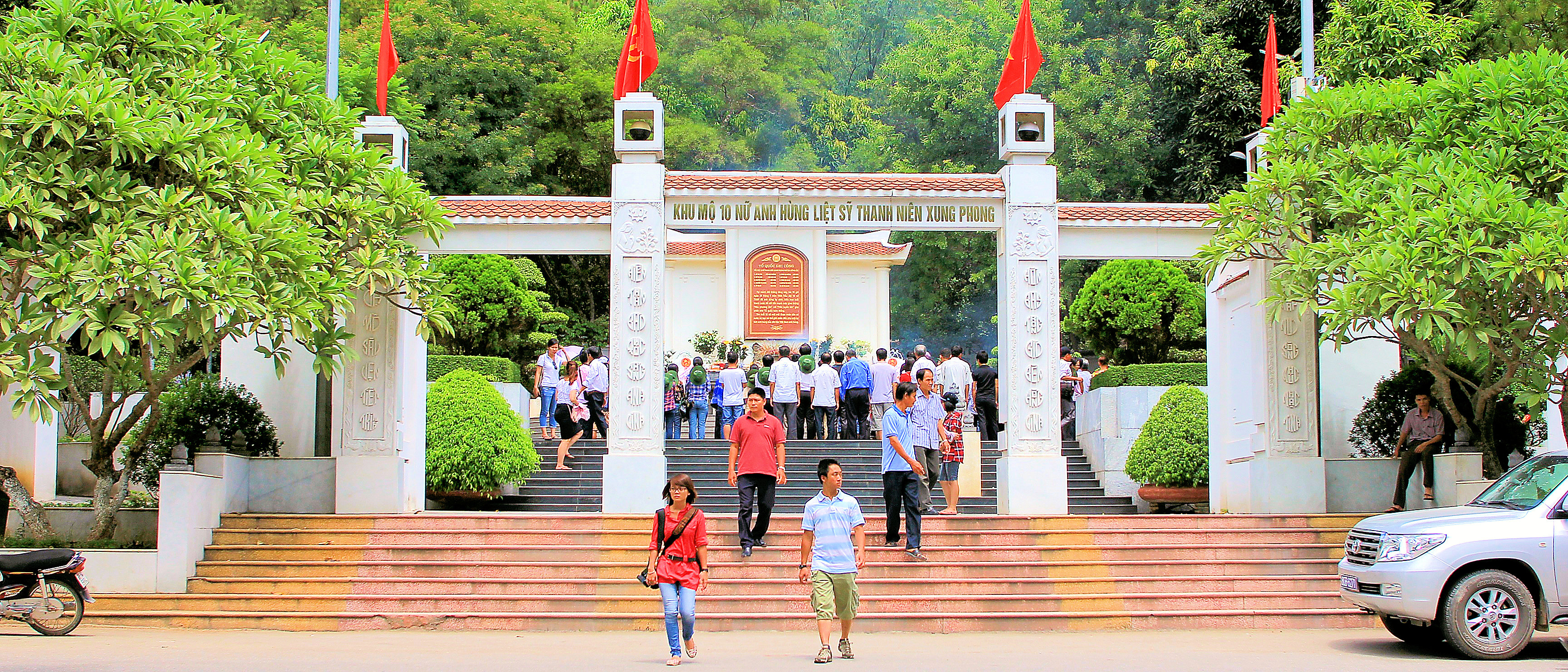
The entrance to the 10 girls' graves

Đồng Lộc Junction is located in Đồng Lộc township of Can Lộc District, Hà Tĩnh Province, on the Ho Chi Minh trail through the Annamite Range (dãy núi Trường Sơn) at the intersection of Highway 15A and Route 2 Hà Tĩnh Province.

The crossroads is now mainly remembered for the memorial to ten young unmarried girls aged 17–22 who were youth volunteers helping with logistics at the T-junction. At noon on 24 July 1968, during the 15th bombing raid of that day, a bomb fell very close to the mouth of the tunnel where the 10 girls were hiding, killing them all. The story of the ten girls was made into a film Ngã ba Đồng Lộc The Girls at Dong Loc Crossroads (1997) directed by Lưu Trọng Ninh starring Thúy Hường, Hương Dung, Ngọc Dung, Yến Vy, and Xuân Bắc.

The location today is a shrine.
