= Thạch Khê iron mine =

Iron mine in northern Vietnam

Thach Khe mine
- Location: Hà Tĩnh Province, Vietnam
- Products: Iron ore

The Thach Khe mine is a large iron mine located in northern Vietnam in the Hà Tĩnh Province. Thach Khe represents one of the largest iron ore reserves in Vietnam and in the world having estimated reserves of 550 million tonnes of ore grading 42% iron metal.

It is currently (2014) planned to increase the iron ore exploitation from five million to seven million tonnes per year.

== See also ==
- Formosa Ha Tinh Steel
