= Environmental impact of the Vietnam War =

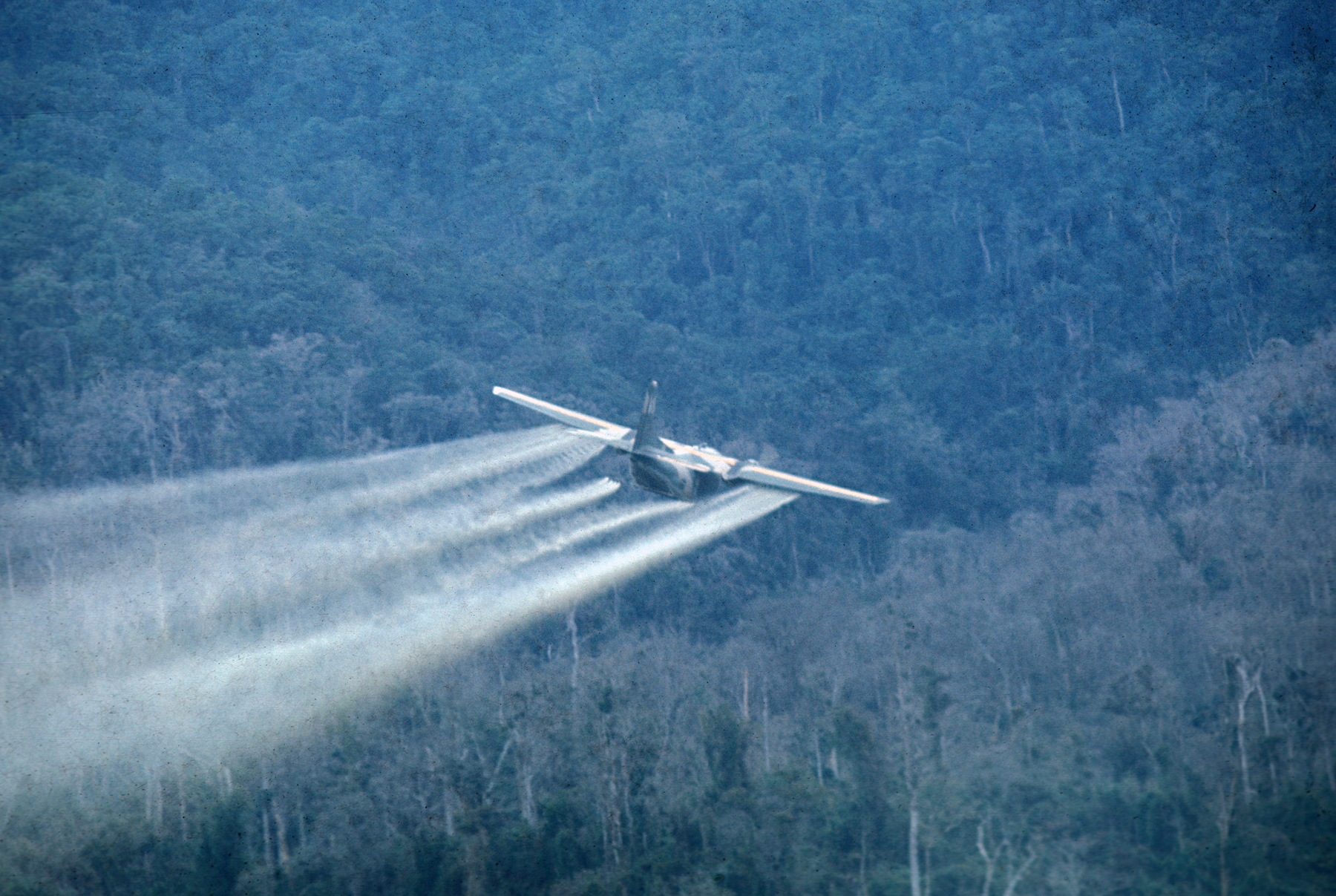
A United States Air Force craft spraying. defoliant in Vietnam.

The Vietnam War had a major and long-lasting impact on the environment of the countries affected. The environment of Vietnam was severely degraded by the use of defoliants, bombing and other military activities. North Vietnam utilized the geography and ecology of the region to conceal their activities and move resources, such as via the complex network of tunnels and paths in the Ho Chi Minh trail. In response, the United States developed and deployed technologies and campaigns to clear forests and destabilize soil, greatly impacting the environment. Over time, the long-term agricultural productivity in parts of Vietnam was reduced by many herbicidal agents and bombing campaigns. The war has also been linked to extensive deforestation and influenced the hydrology of the Mekong region.

== Rainbow Herbicides and Agent Orange ==
The United States would begin their long-term military operation known as Operation Ranch Hand. The U.S. had the goal of eradicating the forests and vegetation of Vietnam to rid the Viet Cong of valuable resources such as food and to make it more difficult for the Viet Cong to stay hidden within the vast forests of Vietnam. The Operation, lasting from 1962 to 1971, largely involved the usage of Herbicides and Defoliants, such as the Rainbow Herbicides. The Rainbow Herbicides consisted of Agent Blue, Agent Green, Agent Purple, Agent Pink, Agent White, and the most infamous being Agent Orange which had several variations. Agent Blue and Purple were among the first that were used in the operation, followed by Green and Pink, and lastly White and Orange.

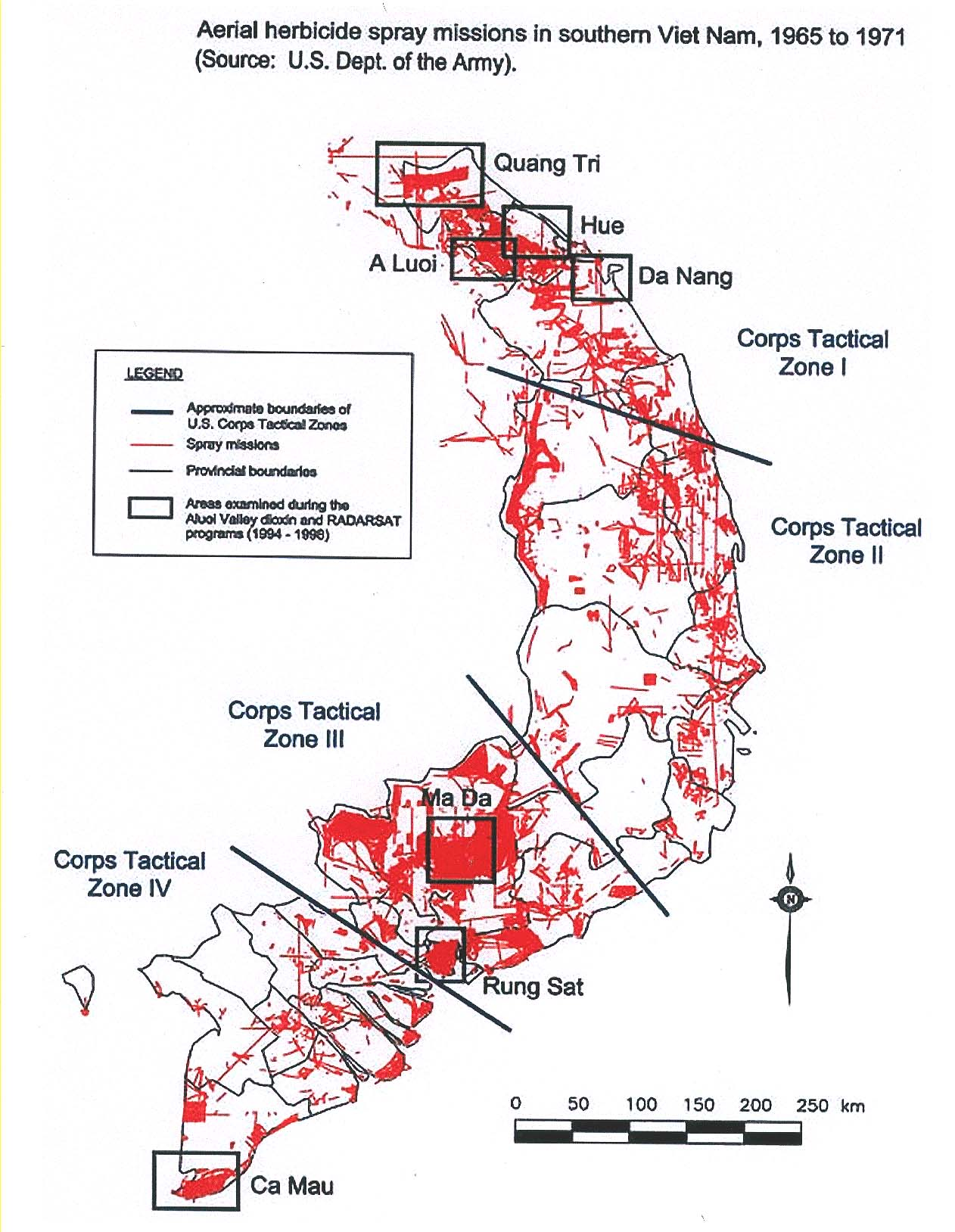
Map showing locations of U.S. Army aerial herbicide spray missions in South Vietnam taking place from 1965 to 1971

Agent Orange made up for 61% of the herbicides that were used in the entire operation, and was introduced 3 years after the operation had begun. It was estimated that 90% of the Agent Orange usage was for forest defoliation, as it was the most effective of the 6 when it came to destroying the forests and vegetation. The forests of Vietnam especially were very vulnerable to a chemical such as Agent Orange, and by the end of the 9-year campaign, 11 million gallons of Agent Orange had been dropped on the region including Laos, Cambodia, and mostly Vietnam. These herbicides not only affected the landscape of Vietnam, but had disastrous effects on the human body. It is estimated that 3 million people were affected by Agent Orange alone and caused severe health problems, many of which were fatal. By 1970, there had been a severe drop in the usage of these herbicides due to controversy surrounding the use of chemical warfare by the United States. Many, including Americans, questioned the ethicality of using such dangerous chemicals especially on the citizens that were affected by the Agents. The chemical warfare the U.S. had been utilizing for nearly a decade had helped to contribute opposition against the war by American citizens.

== Vegetation and forests ==
Estimates from US military records listed destruction of 20% of the jungles in South Vietnam and 20-36% (American Association for the Advancement of Science reported 20-50%) of the mangrove forests. The forests of Vietnam, especially mangrove forests, were immensely impacted by Agent Orange. It was partially the reason why Agent Orange was utilized so much, as a very minuscule amount of it would instantly kill a Mangrove tree. They were very common in the region of the world as well. Because they were so abundant, it made using Agent Orange that much more useful to the United States. Heavy bombing was used in the war as well, and the U.S. had dropped 13 million tons of bombs in Laos, Cambodia, and Vietnam in total. Defoliants had destroyed around 7,700 square miles of forests, estimating to be around 6% of the total land in Vietnam. The effects of Agent Orange persisted after the war, and led to Vietnam's forest cover declining by 50% in the years during the war and after, reaching an all-time low for forest cover in the 80's and 90's. The environmental destruction was described as ecocide by Swedish Prime Minister Olof Palme.

Bombings from 1965-1973 cleared one third of the surface area in the southern sub-basin of the Mekong River. The areas with the most intense bombing experienced significant soil displacement and disturbance of soil layers called bombturbation. The bombturbation reduces forests to be replaced by vegetation with shallow roots and reduces canopy and runoff increases. Destruction from air operations reduced forest cover but emigration induced by the war accounts for significant environmental impacts as well. Nearly 1 million people one fourth of the population was displaced between 1953-1975. Post war migration out of Vietnam between 1975-1985 mostly impacted the northern provinces of Laos. The result was forest regeneration in the northern catchment due to the abandonment of large mountainous areas previously used for agriculture. The depopulation and reduced impacts from bombings in the northern catchment allowed the region to avoid the ecocide experienced in the southern catchment.

== See also ==
- Impact of Agent Orange in Vietnam
