= Hà Tĩnh province =

Province of Vietnam

Hà Tĩnh
- Province
- Tỉnh Hà Tĩnh 省河靜
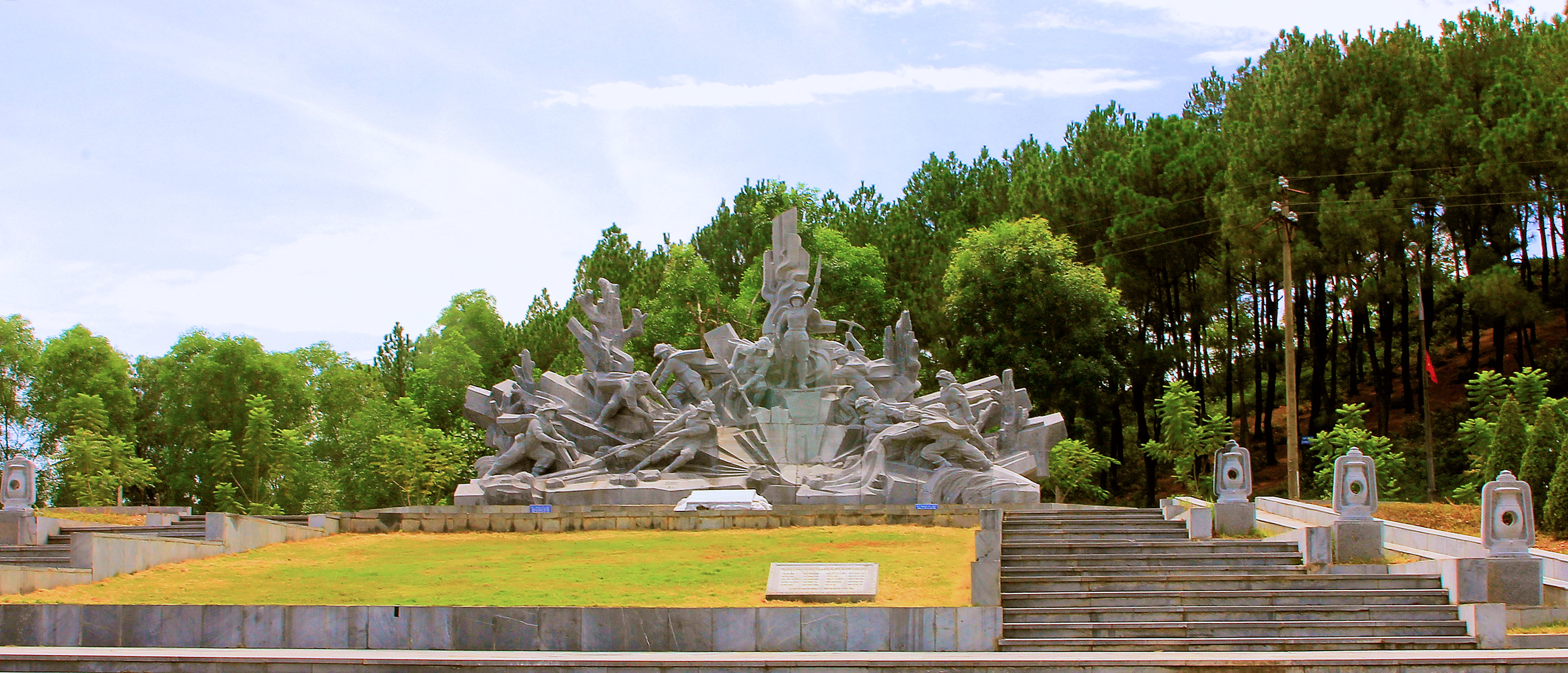
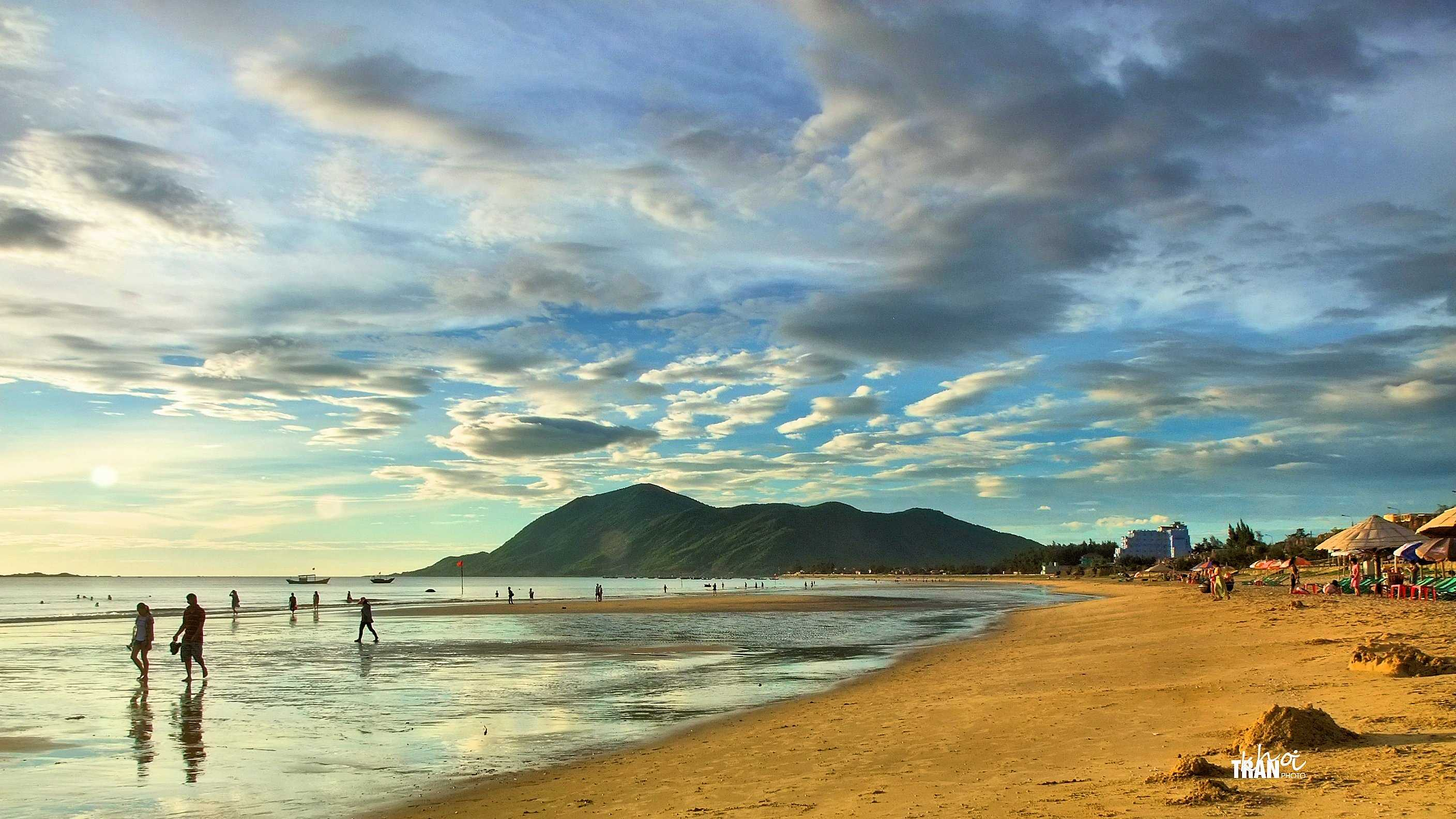
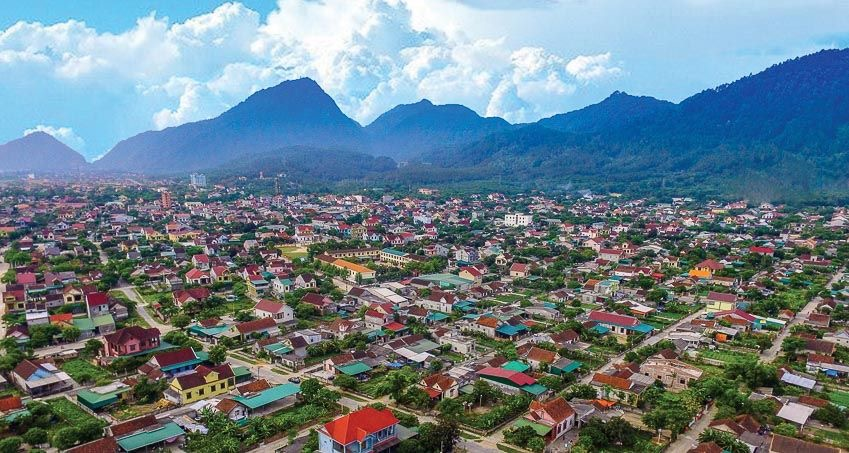
- Clockwise from top left: Đồng Lộc Junction; Hồng Lĩnh Mountains; Thiên Cầm Beach

- Seal

- Interactive map of Hà Tĩnh
- Coordinates: 18°20′N 105°54′E
- Country: Vietnam
- Region: North Central Coast
- Government centre: Thành Sen ward

Government
  - Party Secretary: Nguyễn Duy Lâm
  - People's Council Chair: Nguyễn Hồng Lĩnh
  - People's Committee Chair: Phan Thiên Định

Area
  - Total: 5,994.45 km^{2} (2,314.47 sq mi)

Population (2025)
  - Total: 1,632,784
  - Density: 272.383/km^{2} (705.468/sq mi)

Demographics
  - Ethnicities: Vietnamese, Thai, Chứt, Mường

GDP
  - Total: VND 63.236 trillion US$ 2.830 billion
- Time zone: UTC+7 (ICT)
- Area codes: 239
- ISO 3166 code: VN-23
- HDI (2020): ▲0.730 (20th)
- Website: www.hatinh.gov.vn

Hà Tĩnh is a province in the North Central Coast region of Vietnam. It borders Nghệ An to the north, Quảng Trị to the south, Laos to the west, and the South China Sea (Gulf of Tonkin) to the east.

Hà Tĩnh together with neighbouring Nghệ An province the two provinces are together called "Nghệ Tĩnh", and the locals are known for speaking Vietnamese with a regional accent.

== Geography ==
Hà Tĩnh is about 340 km (211 miles) south of Hanoi.

The climate is sub-tropical, with cooler temperatures in winter; Vietnam's highest ever temperature, 43.4 degrees Celsius (110 Fahrenheit), was recorded in the province in 2019.

== Economy ==
Agriculture, forestry and fishery takes up 35.5% of total GDP and the province's GDP accounts for 0.7% of Vietnam's GDP. Vũng Áng harbour with some plants, factories and a thermal power station is becoming the most active economic hub. Vietnam Steel operates an iron mine in Thạch Khê District, with reserves of 544 million tonnes of iron.

A US$10 billion iron and steel plant was built in Vũng Áng in the 2010s (see Formosa Ha Tinh Steel Corporation). The steel plant is part of an industrial park, which is estimated to cost more than US$20 billion. When finished in 2020, the industrial park will have a port, a 2,100-MW power plant and a steel plant with six blast furnaces. In 2016, the Formosa Steel plant released untreated waste water with heavy metals and other toxins into the nearby sea, which caused the 2016 Vietnam marine life disaster.

== History ==
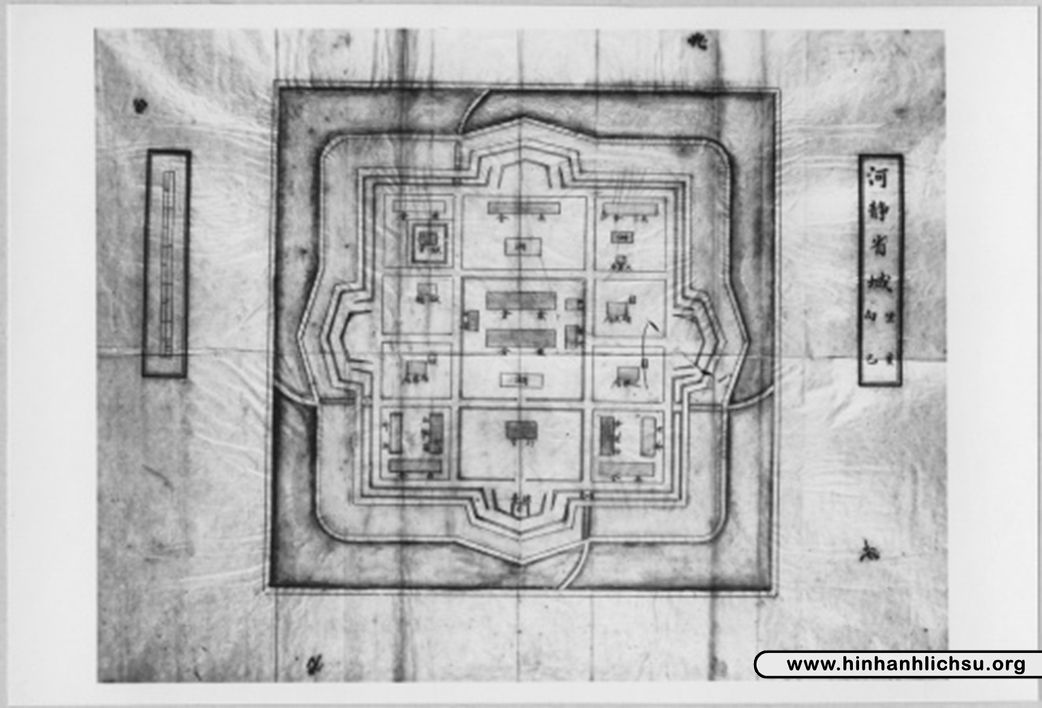
Drawing of Hà Tĩnh citadel in the Nguyễn dynasty

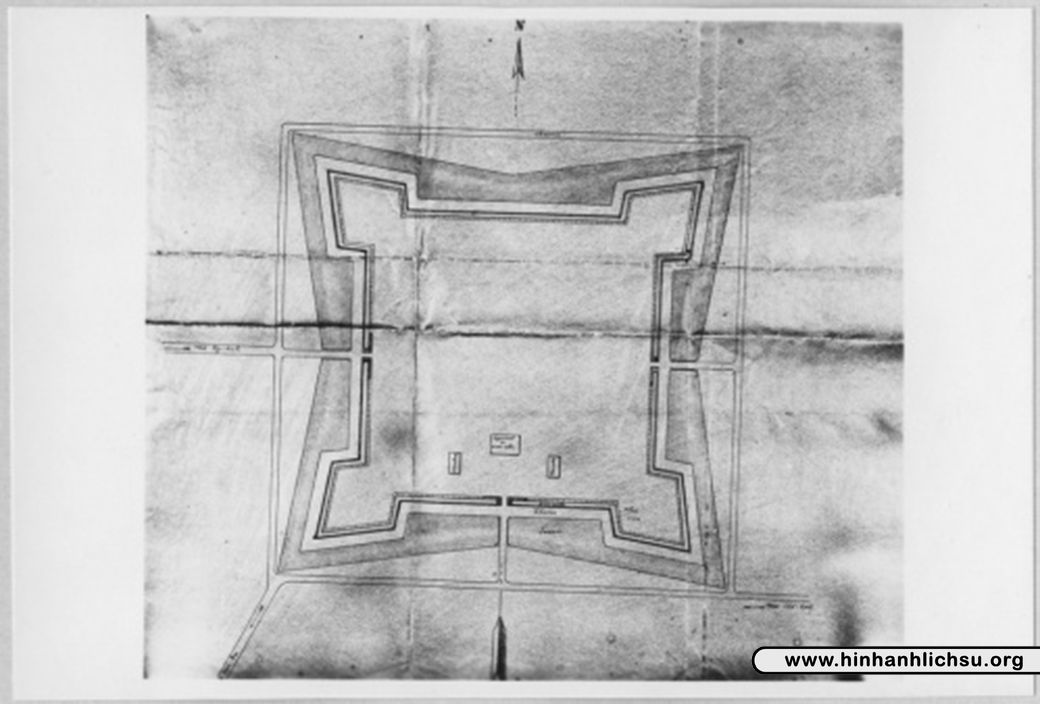
Drawing of Hà Thanh citadel in the Nguyễn dynasty

In chữ Hán, the province's name is written as 河靜, meaning "quiet river". Beginning in 1930 Hà Tĩnh, along with Nghệ An and Quảng Ngãi, was one of the early grounds for the Vietnamese rural Soviet movement and protests.
