= Formosa Ha Tinh Steel =

Steel plant in Hà Tĩnh province, Vietnam

Coordinates: 18.04°N 106.43°E

Hung Nghiep Formosa Ha Tinh Steel Company
- Industry: Steel
- Founded: 2008
- Products: Hot rolled steel, rebar
- Parent: Formosa Plastics Group
- Website: www.fhs.com.tw

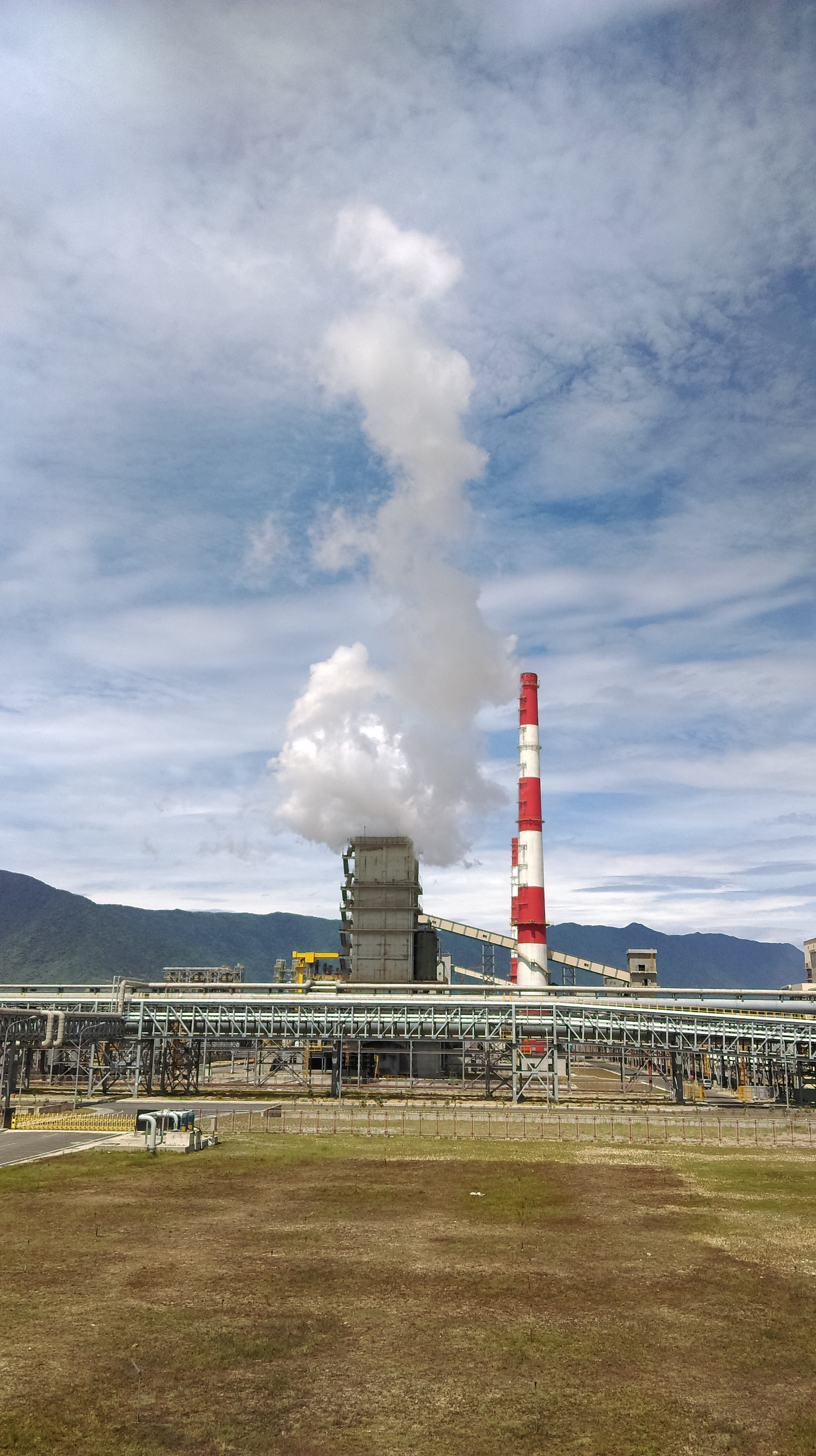
Formosa Vung Ang, 2016

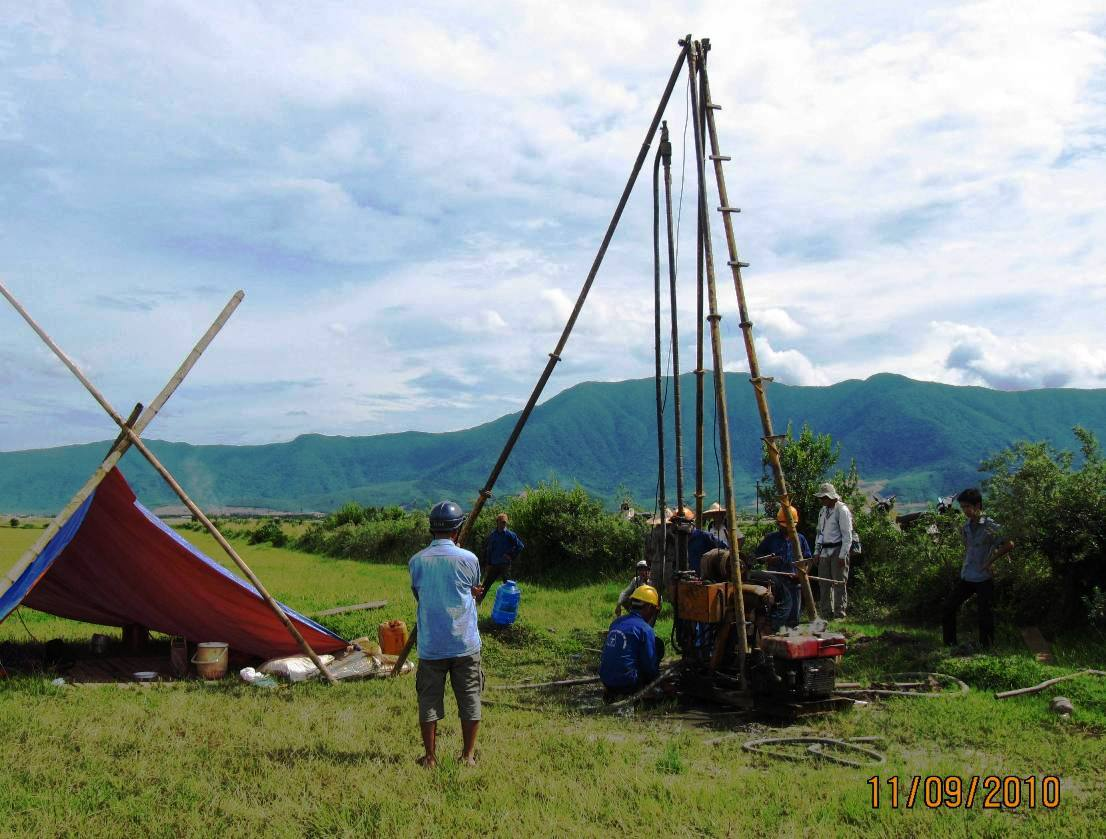
Drilling for engineering survey in Formosa Vung Ang, 2010

Formosa Ha Tinh Steel Corporation (Chinese: 台塑河靜鋼鐵興業責任有限公司, Vietnamese: Công ty TNHH Gang Thép Hưng Nghiệp Formosa Hà Tĩnh, abbr. FHTS) is a steel plant established in the Vung Ang Economic Zone, Vietnam by the Hung Nghiep Formosa Ha Tinh Steel Company under the backing of the Taiwanese conglomerate Formosa Plastics Group.

Development of the plant began in the 2010s. Steel production started in May 2017.

== History ==
Formosa Ha Tinh Steel Corporation was formed in 2008 to establish a large iron and steelmaking plant at a deepwater port in Vietnam. The primary investor and developer was Formosa Plastics Group of Taiwan.

In 2010, 3,300 hectares (33 km^{2}) of land in Kỳ Anh district was allocated to the development company (Hung Nghiep Formosa Ha Tinh Steel Co) by Hà Tĩnh province. Initially statements by the company estimated a $15 billion development cost to install 7.5 million tons pa steel capacity. In 2012 the developer Hung Nghiep Formosa Ha Tinh Steel Co estimated an increased project of $22 billion. Governmental incentives for the plant included low taxation in imported capital goods, low land taxes, and the development of infrastructure supporting the project. Employment due to the project was expected to be c. 10,000 person; with a second phase increasing production to 22 MT pa, and creating c. 30,000 jobs.

A groundbreaking ceremony for the plant took place on 2 December 2012 in the presence of Prime Minister Nguyễn Tấn Dũng. Associated developments included the Thạch Khê iron mine (reserves 544 MT), 60 km north; GW scale thermal electric powerstations; and the Vuang Ang-Son Duong deep sea port, capable of berthing ship of up to 300 to 500 thousand tons.

In 2014, Formosa Plastics reached an agreement to invest $1.15 billion to acquire approximately one third of Fortescue's Iron Ore Bridge project in Western Australia, together with a $123 million investment into a related port project.

In early 2015, China Steel (Taiwan) increased its holding in the plant from 5% to 25%, investing c. $940 million into the development of the plant. In mid 2015 JFE Steel (Japan) acquired a 5% stake ($215.2 million) in the plant.

In late 2015, the plant outputted the first hot rolled coil manufactured in Vietnam. "Phase 1" Blast furnace iron production was scheduled to begin in 2016, with two blast furnaces at the plant having a total production capacity of 7.5 MT pa; approximately 6 MT were for flat steel production, and 1.5 MT for rebar and other rolled steels. Two further expansion phases, were planned to increase production to 15 MT and then 22.5 MT pa.

The first blast furnace began production in May 2017.

In 2017, the company announced an additional ~$350 million investment into the plant, part of which was for the installation of a coke dry quenching system. Equipment for the dry coke quenching was to be supplied by Nippon Steel & Sumikin Engineering Co. Ltd. (NSENGI)

Formosa Ha Tinh Steel's second blast furnace started operations in May 2018, a feasibility plan for the third blast furnace is expected for 2020.

== 2016 mass fish deaths ==
In April 2016 a mass fish poisoning in the sea near off the Vietnam coast was initially blamed on the steel plant - analysis of the sea water showed high phosphate and pH levels; subsequently Vietnamese authorities stated no link had been shown between the plant and fish deaths. The plant was later ordered to dig up and modify a waste pipe to allow easier monitoring by Vietnamese authorities.

In May 2016 the company was found to have systematically evaded taxes and claimed excess tax refunds through stating the wrong tax codes for imported equipment - VND1.55 trillion (US$69.2 million) in tax refunds and VND5.5 billion ($245.54 million) in taxes were required to be paid to the government.

In late June 2016 a government report found Ha Tinh steel responsible for the 2016 fish poisoning incident. Formosa Ha Tinh Steel agreed to pay $500 million (11.5 trillion VND) compensation for the discharge, which contained phenol, cyanides and iron hydroxides. The company blamed the discharge on errors by subcontractors during a trial operation phase. A governmental report found the origin of the pollution to be from water from wet coke quenching, which was released into the sea after a power supply failure at the plant's waste treatment facilities.

According to experts monitoring human trafficking the environmental disaster at Ha Tinh led to increased trafficking of young Vietnamese to Europe, due to the loss of livelihood to local fishermen from the event; victims of the 2019 Essex lorry deaths included people from Hà Tĩnh province.

== Other incidents ==
- In ~2013 Chinese workers at the complex, some of whom lacked proper work visas, were reported as causing some security and order issues in the local area. An affray between Vietnamese locals and Chinese workers was reported at Lien Phu village in Aug 2013.
- During anti-Chinese riots in May 2014 (see 2014 Vietnam anti-China protests) the plant was attacked by rioters, with fires started; four Chinese workers were killed, with 3,000 forced to leave due to the riots. As a result of the riots construction work was halted for ten weeks, resuming in July 2014.
- In March 2015 a scaffolding collapse at the construction site caused the deaths of 16 workers, and injuring or trapping over 100.
- On 30 May 2017, a day after test operations were resumed since the marine life disaster in 2016, a lime kiln at the steel plant exploded. No casualties were reported. The explosion was caused by a blocked Lime kiln dust filter.
- On 26 August 2021 at 15:00, 3 workers died from a carbon dioxide gas leak in the plant.

== See also ==
- List of steel producers
