= Matthias Leupold =

German photographer

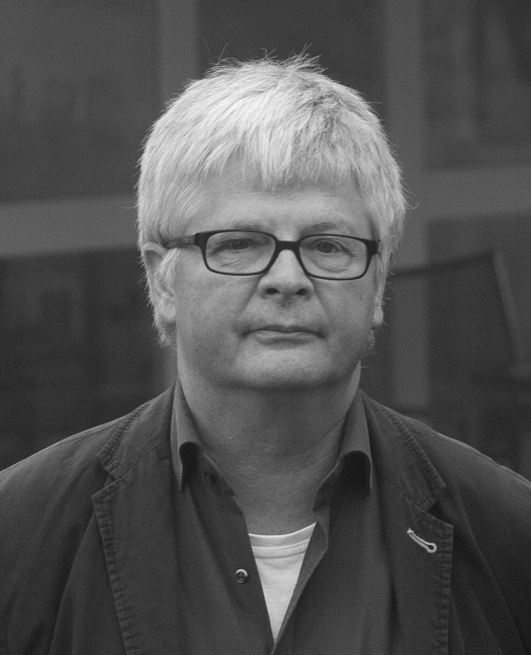

Matthias Leupold (born 1959 in Berlin) is a German photographer and professor who lives and works in Berlin. His father Harry Leupold was set designer at the D.E.F.A. studio for feature films in Potsdam.

== Life and work ==
Matthias Leupold completed his photographic education at the D.E.F.A. studio for feature films in Potsdam-Babelsberg. in the early eighties, he started staging photographs in order to express his interest in both photography and film. At first small exhibitions in East Berlin were tolerated by the GDR government. More extensive exhibitions for example at Bauhaus in Dessau and University of Fine Arts in Dresden were forbidden. In 1986, threats of arrest and condemnation influenced his decision to move from East Berlin to West Berlin. He started studying Visual Communications in 1987 at the Berlin University of the Arts (UdK), completing his degree as a master student. He has traveled to many places, including America and Asia, in order to exhibit his work and to photograph in very diverse places.

In his series of works, Leupold explores manifestations of picture groups and their social references. In 1988/89, he initiated the Flag Raising Ceremony – Staged Photographs of The Third German Art Exhibition in Dresden 1953, to analyze the year 1953 artistically. Thereby, the pictures of this strict beginning of the formalism debate are taken up and restaged photographically. In 1994, Leupold succeeded to exhibit his visual criticism in the Military Historical Museum in Dresden, where he first began his career. His work hung in the same house in which this far-reaching demonstration of power took place in 1953. Another black and white picture series is inspired by the ideological content of the German magazine Die Gartenlaube (Editor: Ernst Keil) and restaged with effortful characteristics, backgrounds and current clothes.

Aside from his series, Leupold photographs numerous frames. Actors, models and laymen made chances for his camera productions. Personal and socially relevant topics like solitude, homecoming, protection, neediness, abundance and waste, as well as current events are reflected.

Some of his photographs make specific content references to a novel by Robert Musil Der Mann ohne Eigenschaften (The Man without Qualities).

Matthias Leupold stayed in the German Academy, Villa Massimo in Rome, from 1997 to 1998. The mostly color photographs, which were taken there, are characterized by observations of southern light on chapels, sculptures and Madonna Portraits.

Most recently, he strayed from his staged photography roots, and roamed into the realm of documentary, creating a full-length film about Vietnamese veterans and their families in the aftermath of Agent Orange usage in the Vietnam war. (2012/13)

Matthias Leupold represents a unique figure in the artistic landscape. This is expressed in his contributions to the exhibitions: Art in the GDR, Berlin National Gallery 2003 and Berlin-Moscow/Moscow-Berlin 2004, in Moscow 2004. When it comes to defining Leupold's work and elaborations, one summarizes in three polar tensions: between statics and dynamics, between contemplation and narration, between comic and symbol. In the pictures, these dimensions and categories do not fall apart but merge partly or completely.

== Works (selection) ==
- 1988–90 Fahnenappell / Flag Raising Ceremony – Scenic Photography to the Third German Art Exhibition in Dresden 1953
- 1994 Leupolds Gartenlaube (Summer House) – Photographs of Admiration in Memory of a German Family Magazin
- 1995 Die Schönheit der Frauen (The Beauty of Women) – Photographic Open Air Studies

== Filmography ==
- 2015: Lighter than Orange – The Legacy of Dioxin in Vietnam. Documentary Film, 72 min, Director, Production, 2015 GRAND PRIZE Documentary Feature Award of Socially Relevant Film Festival New York; Best Feature Documentary Los Angeles CineFest.
- 2015: The Noise of Letea. Documentary film, 35 min, Director, Production.
- 2019: The Photographer Hugo Jaeggi – The Dream is often real enough, Documentary Film, 52 min, Director M.L., Jérôme Depierre, Weltpremiere Fine Arts Film Festival FAFF, Venice, Los Angeles CA, Europapremiere kult.kino Atelier, Basel
- 2020: The Song of the Valley, Documentary Film, 52 min, Direktor M.L., Marie Séférian, world premiere Courage Film Festival, Berlin

== Publications (selection) ==
- 1992 Matthias Leupold, Fahnenappell (Flag Appeal), Scenic Photography to the Third German Art Exhibition in Dresden 1953, Jonasverlag (publishinghouse) Marburg, 1992 ISBN 3-89445-128-9
- 1995 Matthias Leupold, Die Schönheit der Frauen (The Beauty of Women) – Photographic Open Air Studies, Connewitzer Verlagsbuchhandlung (publishing house) 1996 ISBN 3-928833-43-X
- 2004 Matthias Leupold, ISBN 3-932187-28-8 Die Vergangenheit hat erst begonnen (The Past Has Only Just Begun), Schaden Verlag (publishing house) Cologne, 2004

== Individual exhibitions ==
- 1992 Fahnenappell / Flag Raising Ceremony – Scenic Photography to the Third German Art Exhibition in Dresden 1953, Bauhaus Dessau
- 1994 Fahnenappell / Flag Raising Ceremony – Scenic Photography to the Third German Art Exhibition in Dresden 1953, Armed Forces Historical Museum Dresden
- 1996 Die Welt der Frau (The World of Woman) – The woman as such has already proved herself in photography, Festspielgalerie, Berlin
- 2003 Die Vergangenheit hat erst begonnen (The Past Has Only Just Begun) – Art- and Media-Center Berlin-Adlershf and Foundation Moritzburg Landeskunstmuseum Sachsen-Anhalt, Halle/Saale
- 2004 Die Vergangenheit hat erst begonnen (The Past Has Only Just Begun), Kunsthalle, Erfurt
- 2013 Staged Photographs argus fotokunst, Berlin

== Group exhibitions (selection) ==
- 2003 Art in the GDR (Eastern Germany), National Gallery, Berlin
- 2004 Berlin-Moscow Moscow-Berlin, State Historical Museum Moscow
- 2009 Übergangsgesellschaft, A Society in Transition (German: Übergangsgesellschaft), Portraits and Scenes 1980–1990 Akademie der Künste, Academy of Arts Berlin
- 2011 Rom sehen und sterben–Perspektiven auf die Ewige Stadt 1500–2011»See Rome and then die... Perspectives on the eternal City 1500–2011« Kunsthalle Erfurt
- 2012 Geschlossene Gesellschaft-Künstlerische Fotografie in der DDR 1949–1989 (Closed Society – Fine Art Photography in GDR- Eastern Germany 1949–1989), Berlinische Galerie

== Collections (selection) ==
- Prussian Cultural Heritage Foundation, Museum for Photography, Berlin
- Berlinische Galerie
- Bibliothèque Nationale (National Library), Paris
- San Francisco Museum of Modern Art
- Museum Folkwang Essen
- Rheinisches Landesmuseum Bonn
- Foundation Moritzburg Landeskunstmuseum Sachsen-Anhalt, Halle/Saale
- Heinz Nixdorf Museum Forum, Paderborn
- Zeitgeschichtliches Forum Leipzig
- Artothek Berlin
- Museum für Kunst and Gewerbe, Hamburg
- Brandenburgische Kunstsammlungen, Cottbus
- Kupferstichkabinett Berlin
- Kupferstichkabinett Dresden

== Awards ==
- German Academy Villa Massimo, Rome, Italy (residency 1997)
- Bronze Award Best Photographer of the Year, Lianzhou Photo Festival, China 2008
