= Impact of Agent Orange in Vietnam =

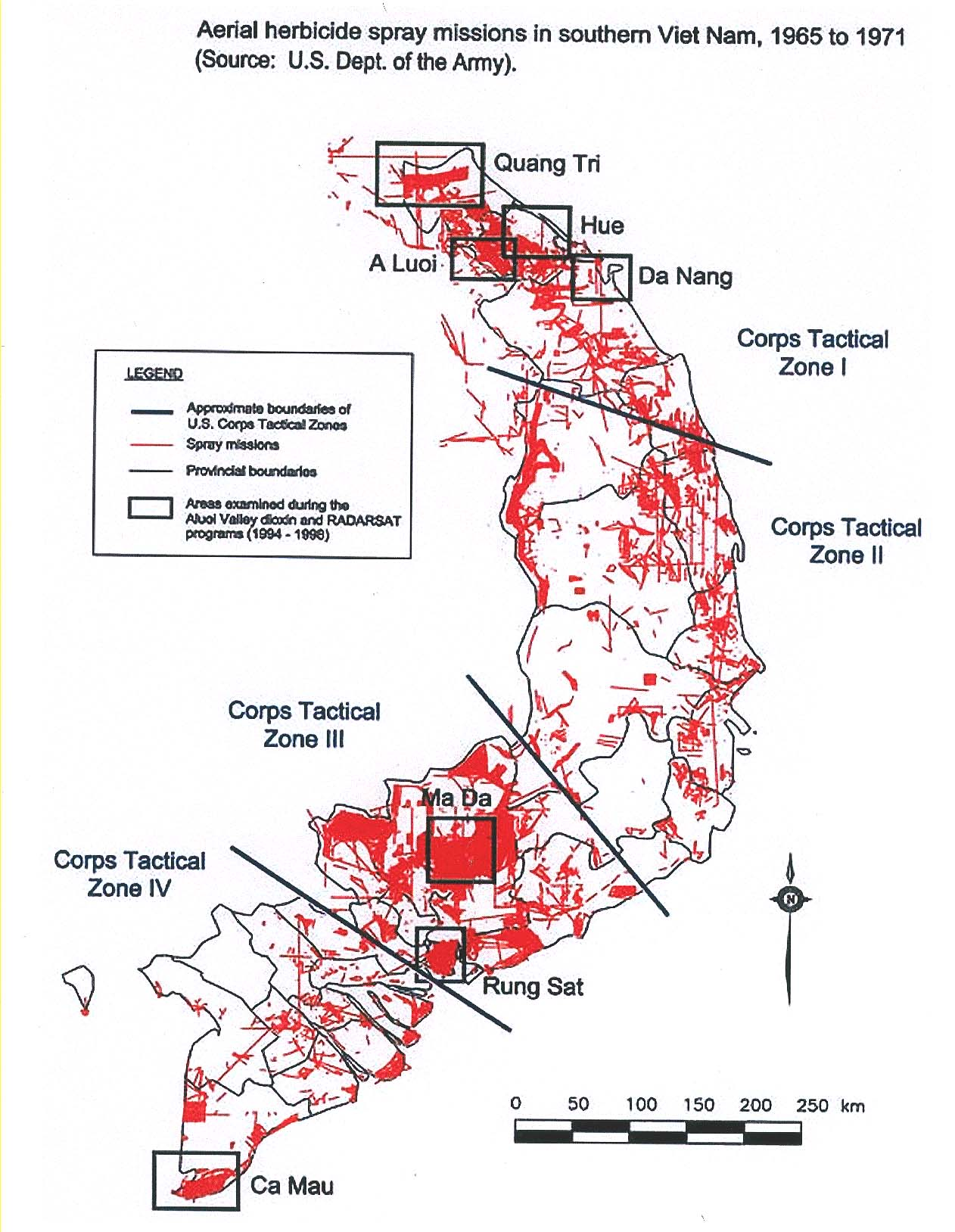
Map showing United States aerial herbicide spraying missions in Vietnam between 1965 and 1971.

Agent Orange is a herbicide, classified as a defoliant, that was used most notably by the U.S. military during the Vietnam War. Its primary purpose was strategic deforestation, destroying the forest cover and food resources necessary for the implementation and sustainability of the North Vietnamese style of guerilla warfare. The U.S. Agent Orange usage reached an apex during Operation Ranch Hand, in which the material (with its extremely toxic impurity, dioxin) was sprayed over 4.5 million acres of land in Vietnam from 1961 to 1971.

The use of Agent Orange has left tangible, long-term impacts upon the Vietnamese people that live in Vietnam as well as those who fled in the mass exodus from 1978 to the early 1990s. Hindsight corrective studies indicate that previous estimates of Agent Orange exposure were biased by government intervention and under-guessing, such that current estimates for dioxin release are almost double those previously predicted. Census data indicates that the United States military directly sprayed upon millions of Vietnamese during strategic Agent Orange use. The effects of Agent Orange on the Vietnamese range from a variety of health effects, ecological effects, and sociopolitical effects.

== Health effects ==
The most illustrative effects of Agent Orange upon the Vietnamese people are the health effects. Scientific consensus has made it clear that the importance of accuracy in terms of site-specific cancer risk as well as the difficulty in identifying Agent Orange as the cause of that specific cancer risk must be acknowledged. Previous studies on the subject have not been generalizable because though they demonstrate statistically significant increase in cancer risk, the populations have been "Western" veterans or Korean veterans, or the sample sizes were too small to be considered appropriate. The U.S. Environmental Protection Agency defines the margin of exposure as "the ratio of the no-observed adverse-effect-level to the estimated exposure dose." Independent scientific analyses of the epidemiology of Agent Orange suggest that there is little to no margin of exposure for dioxin or dioxin-like compounds on vertebrates, meaning that even passive contact or genetic lineage has devastating repercussions.

=== Effects on current Vietnamese citizens ===
Rigorous studies have consequently been conducted to instead measure the levels of dioxin still present in the blood samples of the citizens of both North and South Vietnam. These studies indicate that though most Agent Orange studies have had myopic analyses of American veterans, Vietnamese citizens have had far greater exposure to breadth and scope of the target. The pervasion of dioxin as described by Schechter et al. (made clear in very high TCDD or 2,3,7,8-tetrachlorodibenzo-p-dioxin levels in human milk, adipose tissue, and blood as measured by gas chromatography and mass spectroscopy) in the Vietnamese people living in Vietnam is substantially greater than that of other populations (Schechter et al., 1995). Dioxin levels were corroborated in subsequent studies, most notably those conducted in areas geographically near bombing sites and spray missions during the course of Operation Ranch Hand, approximately between 1962 and 1970. A 2002 sample study of the dioxin levels in the city of Biên Hòa, a populous city in southern Vietnam located in the proximity of an air base used for spray missions, indicated noticeably elevated blood dioxin levels despite a 20-year period of peace, with Agent Orange specifically being found in the blood samples. Emigrants to the city and even children born after the end of the Agent Orange spraying operations had blood samples indicating a presence of dioxin (Schecter et al., 2001). Meta-studies have affirmed the dioxin pathway of genetic inheritance, e.g. a statistically significant correlation between paternal exposure to Agent Orange and spina bifida over three case-control studies from 1966 to 2008.

According to the Vietnamese government, the U.S. program resulted in 400,000 deaths and permanent injuries due to a range of cancers and other ailments, and that approximately 4.8 million Vietnamese people were exposed to Agent Orange according to census data.

=== Effects on Vietnamese refugees ===
Following the end of the Vietnam War, two million refugees from Vietnam, as well as Laos and Cambodia, fled to other countries. By 1992, upwards of 1 million refugees had settled in the United States, 750,000 in other North American and European countries, and many others remained in refugee camps from Thai-Cambodian border to Hong Kong, unable to obtain the visas and immigration documents necessary to permanently immigrate.

Scientific reports have concluded that refugees who had reported being exposed to chemical sprays while in South Vietnam continued to experience pain in the eyes and skin as well as gastrointestinal upsets. In one study, ninety-two percent of participants suffered incessant fatigue; others reported abortions and monstrous births. Meta-analyses of the most current studies on the association between Agent Orange and birth defects have concluded that there is a statistically significant correlation such that having a parent who was exposed to Agent Orange at any point in their life will increase one's likelihood of either possessing or acting as a genetic carrier of birth defects. Vietnamese studies specifically indicated an even greater correlation between parental exposure and birth defects, with scholars concluding that the rate of association varied situationally as degree of exposure and intensity were factors also considered.

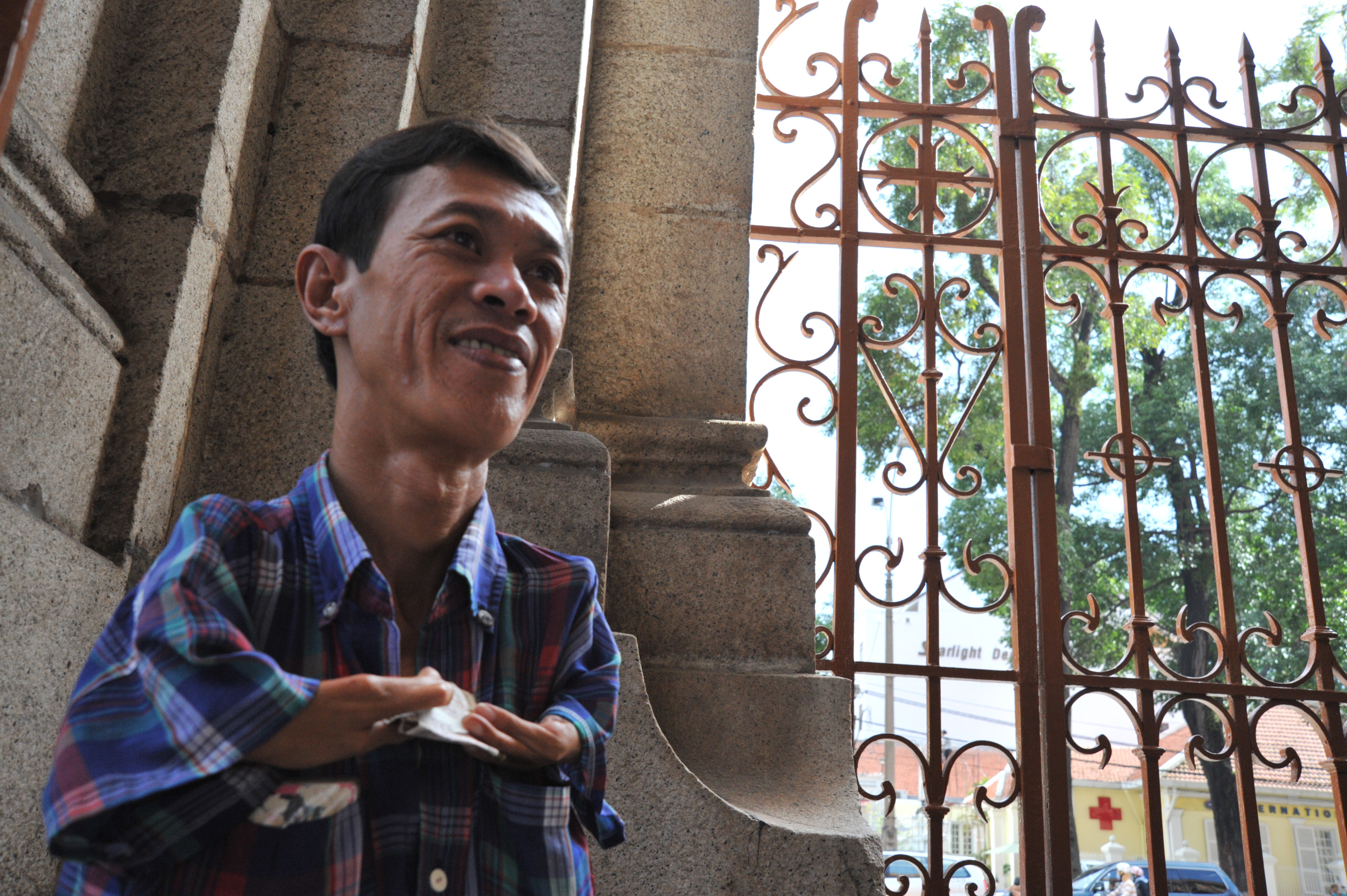
Severe arm deformity most likely related to Agent Orange exposure when he was in gestation and his pregnant mother was exposed to the byproduct present in Agent Orange defoliant, 2,3,7,8-Tetrachlorodibenzo-p-dioxin.

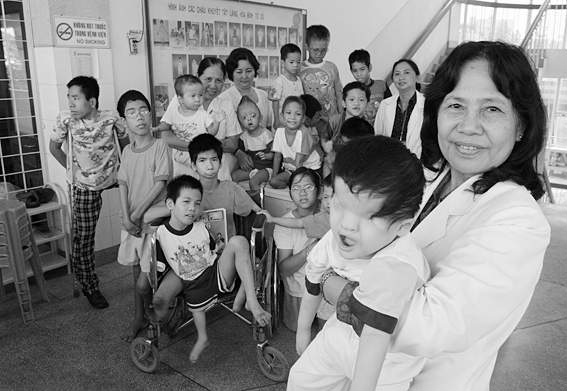
Handicapped children, most of them victims of Agent Orange

== Ecological effects ==
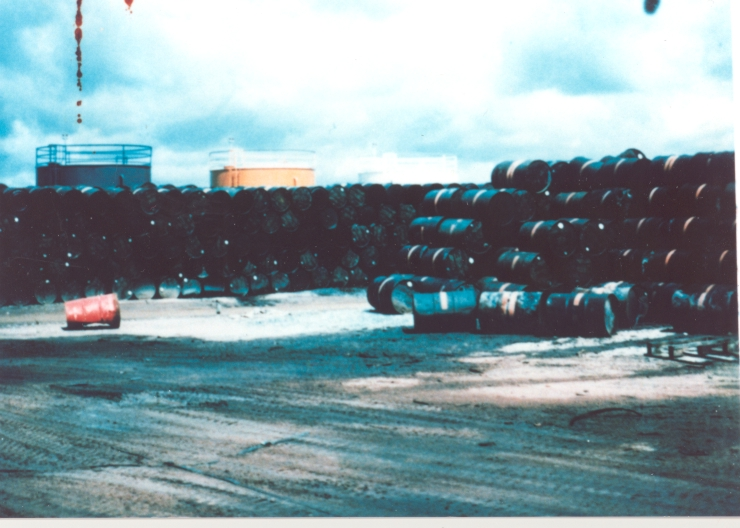
Agent Orange chemical drums

Agent Orange had devastating ecological effects on Vietnam's plant life, which also contributed to the creation of refugees during the war. The ecological effects of Agent Orange have been reported to continue to affect the daily lives of Vietnamese citizens. A study showed dioxin contamination in soil and sediment samples and hypothesized "that a major route of current and past exposures is from the movement of dioxin from soil into river sediment, then into fish, and from fish consumption into people." Studies in the Aluoi Valley, a village near a now defunct military base that was operating between 1963 and 1966, confirmed this process of biological magnification, as contaminated soil acted as "reservoirs" of TCDD Agent Orange toxin that would later transfer to fish and ducks and finally to humans, all via consumption. The International Union for Conservation of Nature concluded that "much of the damage can probably never be repaired."

=== Deforestation ===
Official U.S. military records have listed figures including the destruction of 20% of the jungles of South Vietnam and 20–36% (with other figures reporting 20–50%) of the mangrove forests. An overall reduction in biomass, i.e. plant and animal populations, has been noted along with loss of soil nutrients and ecosystem productivity in terms of growth yields. Forests that have been sprayed multiple times (estimates point to about a quantity of land equaling 500,000 ha (1,200,000 acres)) have extensively exacerbated ecological disadvantages; recovery times are dubious and "the plant and animal communities have been totally disrupted" due to "total annihilation of the vegetative cover". The long-term effect of this deforestation continues to result in less aged foliage and mangroves being unable to grow from even a single spraying, with many patches of economically unviable grass colloquially referred to as "American grass". Farmland that was destroyed in the process of militarization and the creation of battlefields produced an agricultural wasteland, forcing Vietnamese farmers to work with contaminated soil for more than 40 years. The environmental destruction caused by this defoliation has been described by Swedish Prime Minister Olof Palme, lawyers, historians and other academics as an ecocide.

=== Ecological refugees ===
The use of Agent Orange is considered a "notorious example" of the expropriation of human environment for warfare, forcing many rural Vietnamese to move to cities as ecological refugees to survive because their crops and livelihood had been destroyed. Harvard professor Samuel P. Huntington noted that during the Vietnam War, the urban population doubled or tripled as people moved from rural areas to escape war. Jim Glassman argued that ecological destruction and crop destruction, including from Agent Orange, produced rural refugees to cities and helped as part of counterinsurgency efforts to control rural areas and isolate the population from the Viet Cong. He further wrote that the millions of war refugees "cannot be seen narrowly as the result of one or another form of warfare".

== Sociopolitical effects ==
Various sociopolitical effects of Agent Orange have also been documented. Difficulty in maintaining judicial and civil transparency persists despite decades passing since the use of Agent Orange by the United States military. Corporations indicted by the ethicality of their chemical use have been described as "antagonistic and focused on technological arguments".

=== Legal responses ===
==== Vietnamese victims class action lawsuit ====
The first legal proceeding on behalf of Vietnamese victims was undertaken in January 2004 in a New York district court. Ultimately, the district court held that "herbicide spraying . . . did not constitute a war crime pre-1975" and that international law prevented the companies that produced Agent Orange from being liable. Alternative models for reconciling the harms done by dioxin on the Vietnamese people with reparations have also been proposed. Some have called for the defoliation and destruction to be deemed an "environmental war crime". Law reviews have even called for a revision to the litigation process in the U.S. due to the harmful implications regarding justice, reparations, and accountability as a result of the political sway of aggregate private interests.

Citizen-to-citizen dialogue for individuals to call for accountability by the United States government was first established in 2006 by the Ford Foundation. Citizens sought a legal avenue by which private citizens and policy makers could work together to form a coherent plan of action in addressing the legacy of Agent Orange. The U.S.-Vietnam Dialogue Group on Agent Orange/Dioxin, composed of members of the Aspen Institute, Vietnam National University, and Vietnam Veterans Association, is the most notable example of this civic response. Long-term programs and continued checkups on the state of current plans to address Agent Orange are heavily monitored.

=== Government responses ===
Questions of governmental accountability have been raised towards who should be responsible for allowing the use of the chemical dioxin despite knowing the risks. Those who said that the use (at the time of the Vietnam War) of Agent Orange was merely a means of defeating the Viet Cong did not believe that the defoliant violated the Geneva Protocol. During the war, resolutions were introduced to the United Nations charging that the U.S. was violating the 1925 Geneva Protocol, which regulated the use of chemical and biological weapons; however, the resolutions were defeated. The extensive environmental damage that resulted from usage of the herbicide prompted the United Nations to pass Resolution 31/72 and ratify the Environmental Modification Convention in 1976. Many states do not regard this as a complete ban on the use of herbicides and defoliants in warfare.

There is reason to believe that sociopolitical context constrains the ability of government bodies to reveal the truth regarding food-behavior research, as well as the scientific studies crafted by these bodies; governments may have an incentive to disrupt or obstruct investigations into the matter.

Additional remediative policies have been proposed by concerned groups of citizens due to a lack of governmental accountability. The U.S.-Vietnam Dialogue Group on Agent Orange/Dioxin of the Aspen Institute established a 10-year Plan of Action on June 16, 2010, to call for governmental participation in addressing herbicide effect in Vietnam. This plan calls for the United States and the Vietnamese government to work with other governments and NGOs to invest 30 million dollars over ten years to clean and purify harmed ecosystems and expand services to families who have been affected medically and physically by Agent Orange.

=== Scientific objections ===
The current scientific consensus on the effects of Agent Orange concludes that scientists at the time made erroneous judgments on how devastating the chemical could be. Scientific reviews ex post facto have indicated that many of these supposedly objective studies that conclude a beneficial use of Agent Orange were based on access to still classified documents and little else. According to Koppes's study, scientists repeatedly minimized the harmful effects of the chemical and ignored empirical evidence.
