= United Nations Convention =

United Nations Convention may refer to:

- Organizations, mainly in economic and social fields and for the promotion of human rights, that are set up by the United Nations Economic and Social Council under the authority of Article 68 of the United Nations Charter. These include the following:
  - United Nations Convention on the Rights of the Child
  - United Nations Convention on the Law of the Sea
  - United Nations Convention against Torture
  - United Nations Convention on Contracts for the International Sale of Goods
  - United Nations Convention against Corruption
  - United Nations Convention Against Illicit Traffic in Narcotic Drugs and Psychotropic Substances
  - United Nations Convention against Transnational Organized Crime
  - United Nations Convention on Environmental Modification
- Some United Nations General Assembly resolutions, such as:
  - Universal Declaration of Human Rights
  - United Nations Convention on Environmental Modification
  - Convention on the Prevention and Punishment of the Crime of Genocide
