= List of parties to the Environmental Modification Convention =

Participation in the Environmental Modification Convention Parties Only signed Non-signatory

The list of parties to the Environmental Modification Convention encompasses the states who have signed and ratified or acceded to the international agreement prohibiting military use of environmental modification techniques.

On May 18, 1977, the Environmental Modification Convention (ENMOD) was opened for signature. North Yemen became the first state to deposit the treaty on 20 July 1977. The treaty came into force and closed for signature on October 5, 1978. Since then, states that did not sign the treaty can now only accede to it. The instrument of ratification, accession, or succession is deposited with the Secretary-General of the United Nations

As of 2022, 78 states have ratified or acceded to the treaty, most recently the State of Palestine on 29 December 2017. A further 16 states have signed but not ratified the treaty.

As of March 2013 the third review conference had not been scheduled as there were under 10 respondents showing interest in reconvening.

== List of parties ==
State	Signed	Ratified or Acceded	Method
Afghanistan		Oct 22, 1985	Accession
Algeria		Dec 19, 1991	Accession
Antigua and Barbuda		Oct 25, 1988	Succession from United Kingdom
Argentina		Mar 20, 1987	Accession
Armenia		May 15, 2002	Accession
Australia	May 31, 1978	Sep 7, 1984	Ratification
Austria		Jan 17, 1990	Accession
Bangladesh		Oct 3, 1979	Accession
Belarus	May 18, 1977	Jun 7, 1978	Ratification as Byelorussian SSR
Belgium	May 18, 1977	Jul 12, 1982	Ratification
Benin	Jun 10, 1977	Jun 30, 1986	Ratification
Brazil	Nov 9, 1977	Oct 12, 1984	Ratification
Bulgaria	May 18, 1977	May 31, 1978	Ratification
Cameroon		Apr 18, 2011	Accession
Canada	May 18, 1977	Jun 11, 1981	Ratification
Cape Verde		Oct 3, 1979	Accession
Chile		Apr 26, 1994	Accession
China		Jun 8, 2005	Accession
Costa Rica		Feb 7, 1996	Accession
Cuba	Sep 23, 1977	Apr 10, 1978	Ratification
Cyprus	Oct 7, 1977	Apr 12, 1978	Ratification
Czech Republic		Feb 22, 1993	Succession from Czechoslovakia; Signed 18 May 1977; Ratified 12 May 1978
Denmark	May 18, 1977	Apr 19, 1978	Ratification
Dominica		Nov 9, 1992	Succession from United Kingdom
Egypt		Apr 1, 1982	Accession
Estonia		Apr 14, 2011	Accession
Finland	May 18, 1977	May 12, 1978	Ratification
Germany	May 18, 1977	May 24, 1983	Ratification as West Germany; Also East Germany; Signed 18 May 1977; Ratified 25 May 1978
Ghana	Mar 21, 1978	Jun 22, 1978	Ratification
Greece		Aug 23, 1983	Accession
Guatemala		Mar 21, 1988	Accession
Honduras		Aug 16, 2010	Accession
Hungary	May 18, 1977	Apr 19, 1978	Ratification
India	Dec 15, 1977	Dec 15, 1978	Ratification
Ireland	May 18, 1977	Dec 16, 1982	Ratification
Italy	May 18, 1977	Nov 27, 1981	Ratification
Japan		Jun 9, 1982	Accession
Kazakhstan		Apr 25, 2005	Accession
Kuwait		Jan 2, 1980	Accession
Kyrgyzstan		Jun 15, 2015	Accession
Laos	Apr 13, 1978	Oct 5, 1978	Ratification
Lithuania		Apr 16, 2002	Accession
Malawi		Oct 5, 1978	Accession
Mauritius		Dec 9, 1992	Accession
Mongolia	May 18, 1977	May 19, 1978	Ratification
Netherlands	May 18, 1977	Apr 15, 1983	Ratification
New Zealand		Sep 7, 1984	Accession, includes Cook Islands and Niue
Nicaragua	Aug 11, 1977	Sep 6, 2007	Ratification
Niger		Feb 17, 1993	Accession
North Korea		Nov 8, 1984	Accession
Norway	May 18, 1977	Feb 15, 1979	Ratification
Pakistan		Feb 27, 1986	Accession
Palestine		Dec 29, 2017	Accession
Panama		May 13, 2003	Accession
Papua New Guinea		Oct 28, 1980	Accession
Poland	May 18, 1977	Jun 8, 1978	Ratification
Romania	May 18, 1977	May 6, 1983	Ratification
Russia	May 18, 1977	May 30, 1978	Ratification as Soviet Union
Saint Lucia		May 27, 1993	Succession from United Kingdom
Saint Vincent and the Grenadines		Apr 27, 1999	Succession from United Kingdom
Sao Tome and Principe		Oct 5, 1979	Accession
Slovakia		May 28, 1993	Succession from Czechoslovakia; Signed 18 May 1977; Ratified 12 May 1978
Slovenia		Apr 20, 2005	Accession
Solomon Islands		Jun 19, 1981	Succession from United Kingdom
South Korea		Dec 2, 1986	Accession
Spain	May 18, 1977	Jul 19, 1978	Ratification
Sri Lanka	Jun 8, 1977	Apr 25, 1978	Ratification
Sweden		Apr 27, 1984	Accession
Switzerland		Aug 5, 1988	Accession
Tajikistan		Oct 12, 1999	Accession
Tunisia	May 11, 1978	May 11, 1978	Ratification
Ukraine	May 18, 1977	Jun 13, 1978	Ratification as Ukrainian SSR
United Kingdom	May 18, 1977	May 16, 1978	Ratification
United States	May 18, 1977	Jan 17, 1980	Ratification
Uruguay		Sep 16, 1993	Accession
Uzbekistan		May 26, 1993	Accession
Vietnam		Aug 26, 1980	Accession
Yemen	May 18, 1977	Jul 20, 1977	Ratification as North Yemen; South Yemen also acceded 12 June 1979 prior to Yemeni unification.

== States that have signed but not ratified ==
State	Signed
Bolivia	May 18, 1977
Democratic Republic of the Congo; Signed as Zaire	Feb 28, 1978
Ethiopia	May 18, 1977
Holy See	May 27, 1977
Iceland	May 18, 1977
Iran	May 18, 1977
Iraq	Aug 15, 1977
Lebanon	May 18, 1977
Liberia	May 18, 1977
Luxembourg	May 18, 1977
Morocco	May 18, 1977
Portugal	May 18, 1977
Sierra Leone	Apr 12, 1978
Syria	Aug 4, 1977
Turkey	May 18, 1977
Uganda	May 18, 1977

== States that have not signed ==
101 UN member states have never signed the treaty.

- Albania
- Andorra
- Angola
- Azerbaijan
- Bahamas
- Bahrain
- Barbados
- Belize
- Bhutan
- Bosnia and Herzegovina
- Botswana
- Brunei
- Burkina Faso
- Burundi
- Cambodia
- Central African Republic
- Chad
- Colombia
- Comoros
- Republic of the Congo
- Croatia
- Djibouti
- Dominican Republic
- Ecuador
- El Salvador
- Equatorial Guinea
- Eritrea
- Fiji
- France
- Gabon
- Gambia
- Georgia
- Grenada
- Guinea
- Guinea-Bissau
- Guyana
- Haiti
- Indonesia
- Israel
- Ivory Coast
- Jamaica
- Jordan
- Kenya
- Kiribati
- Latvia
- Lesotho
- Libya
- Liechtenstein
- North Macedonia
- Madagascar
- Malaysia
- Maldives
- Mali
- Malta
- Marshall Islands
- Mauritania
- Mexico
- Micronesia
- Moldova
- Monaco
- Montenegro
- Mozambique
- Myanmar
- Namibia
- Nauru
- Nepal
- Nigeria
- Oman
- Palau
- Paraguay
- Peru
- Philippines
- Qatar
- Rwanda
- Saint Kitts and Nevis
- Samoa
- San Marino
- Saudi Arabia
- Senegal
- Serbia
- Seychelles
- Singapore
- Somalia
- South Africa
- South Sudan
- Sudan
- Suriname
- Swaziland
- Tanzania
- Thailand
- Timor Leste
- Togo
- Tonga
- Trinidad and Tobago
- Turkmenistan
- Tuvalu
- United Arab Emirates
- Vanuatu
- Venezuela
- Zambia
- Zimbabwe

The Cook Islands and Niue, two associated states of New Zealand which have had their "full treaty-making capacity" recognised by United Nations Secretariat, are not parties to the treaty but are bound by its provisions by virtue of their administration by New Zealand when the latter ratified the ENMOD convention.
