= Environmental Modification Convention =

1977 international treaty on environmental modification

Environmental Modification (ENMOD) Convention
Convention on the Prohibition of Military or Any Other Hostile Use of Environmental Modification Techniques
- Participation in the Environmental Modification Convention Parties Only signed Non-signatory
- Drafted: 10 December 1976
- Signed: 18 May 1977
- Location: Geneva, Switzerland
- Effective: 5 October 1978
- Condition: Ratification by 20 states
- Signatories: 48
- Parties: 78 (complete list)
- Depositary: Secretary-General of the United Nations
- Languages: English, Arabic, Chinese, French, Russian, and Spanish

Full text
- Environmental Modification Convention at Wikisource

The Environmental Modification Convention (ENMOD), formally the Convention on the Prohibition of Military or Any Other Hostile Use of Environmental Modification Techniques, is an international treaty prohibiting the military or other hostile use of environmental modification techniques having widespread, long-lasting or severe effects. It opened for signature on 18 May 1977 in Geneva and entered into force on 5 October 1978.

The Convention bans weather warfare, which is the use of weather modification techniques for the purposes of inducing damage or destruction. The Convention on Biological Diversity of 2010 would also ban some forms of weather modification or geoengineering.

Many states do not regard this as a complete ban on the use of herbicides in warfare, such as Agent Orange, but it does require case-by-case consideration.

== Parties ==
The convention was signed by 48 states; 16 of the signatories have not ratified. As of 2022 the convention has 78 state parties.

== History ==
The problem of artificial modification of the environment for military or other hostile purposes was brought to the international agenda in the early 1970s. Following the US decision of July 1972 to renounce the use of climate modification techniques for hostile purposes, the 1973 resolution by the US Senate calling for an international agreement "prohibiting the use of any environmental or geophysical modification activity as a weapon of war", and an in-depth review by the Department of Defense of the military aspects of weather and other environmental modification techniques, US decided to seek agreement with the Soviet Union to explore the possibilities of an international agreement.

In July 1974, US and USSR agreed to hold bilateral discussions on measures to overcome the danger of the use of environmental modification techniques for military purposes and three subsequent rounds of discussions in 1974 and 1975. In August 1975, US and USSR tabled identical draft texts of a convention at the Conference of the Committee on Disarmament (CCD), Conference on Disarmament, where intensive negotiations resulted in a modified text and understandings regarding four articles of this Convention in 1976.

The convention was approved by Resolution 31/72 of the General Assembly of the United Nations on 10 December 1976, by 96 to 8 votes with 30 abstentions.

== Environmental Modification Technique ==
Environmental Modification Technique includes any technique for changing – through the deliberate manipulation of natural processes – the dynamics, composition or structure of the earth, including its biota, lithosphere, hydrosphere and atmosphere, or of outer space.

== Structure of ENMOD ==
The Convention contains ten articles and one Annex on the Consultative Committee of Experts. Integral part of the convention are also the Understandings relating to articles I, II, III and VIII. These Understandings are not incorporated into the convention but are part of the negotiating record and were included in the report transmitted by the Conference of the Committee on Disarmament to the United Nations General Assembly in September 1976 Report of the Conference of the Committee on Disarmament, Volume I, General Assembly Official records: Thirty-first session, Supplement No. 27 (A/31/27), New York, United Nations, 1976, pp. 91–92.

== Anthropogenic climate change ==
ENMOD treaty members are responsible for 83% of carbon dioxide emissions since the treaty entered into force in 1978. The ENMOD treaty could potentially be used by ENMOD member states seeking climate-change loss and damage compensation from other ENMOD member states at the International Court of Justice. With the knowledge that carbon dioxide emissions can enhance extreme weather events, the continued unmitigated greenhouse gas emissions from some ENMOD member states could be viewed as ‘reckless’ in the context of deliberately declining emissions from other ENMOD member states. It is unclear whether the International Court of Justice will consider the ENMOD treaty when it issues a legal opinion on international climate change obligations requested by the United Nations General Assembly on 29 March 2023.

== See also ==
- Arms control agreements
- Environmental agreements
- Climate engineering
- Operation Popeye
- United Nations General Assembly Resolution 31/72
