= Endothall =

Names
- IUPAC name 7-Oxabicyclo[2.2.1]heptane-2,3-dicarboxylic acid
- Other names Endothal; 3,6-Endoxohexahydrophthalic acid; Norcantharidic acid

Identifiers
CAS Number	145-73-3
3D model (JSmol)	Interactive image
ChEMBL	ChEMBL8080
ChemSpider	3112
ECHA InfoCard	100.005.146
EC Number	205-660-5
PubChem CID	3225
UNII	18F7018HG1
UN number	2811
CompTox Dashboard (EPA)	DTXSID7024081
- InChI: InChI=1S/C8H10O5/c9-7(10)5-3-1-2-4(13-3)6(5)8(11)12/h3-6H,1-2H2,(H,9,10)(H,11,12) Key: GXEKYRXVRROBEV-UHFFFAOYSA-N
- SMILES: C1CC2C(C(C1O2)C(=O)O)C(=O)O

Properties
Chemical formula	C_{8}H_{10}O_{5}
Molar mass	186.163 g·mol^{−1}
Density	1.431 g/cm^{3} (20 °C)
Melting point	144 °C (291 °F; 417 K)
Solubility in water	100 g/L (20 °C)

Hazards
- Lethal dose or concentration (LD, LC)
LD_{50} (median dose)	38 mg/kg (oral, rat)
- Except where otherwise noted, data are given for materials in their standard state (at 25 °C [77 °F], 100 kPa). Infobox references

Endothall (3,6-endoxohexahydrophthalic acid) is used as an herbicide for terrestrial and aquatic plants. It is used as an aquatic herbicide for submerged aquatic plants and algae in lakes, ponds and irrigation canals. It is used as a desiccant on potatoes, hops, cotton, clover and alfalfa. It is used as a biocide to control mollusks and algae in cooling towers.

Endothall is a selective contact herbicide that has been used to manage submerged aquatic vegetation for over 50 years. The herbicide damages the cells of susceptible plants at the point of contact but does not affect areas untouched by the herbicide, like roots or tubers (underground storage structures).

The chemical formula for endothall is C_{8}H_{10}O_{5}. Its Chemical Abstracts Service (CAS) name is 7-oxabicyclo[2.2.1]heptane-2,3-dicarboxylic acid. It is an organic acid but is used as the dipotassium salt or the mono-N, N-dimethylalkylamine salt. It is considered safe in drinking water by the EPA up to a maximum contaminant level of 0.1 mg/L (100 ppb). Some people who drink water contaminated above this level for many years experience stomach or intestine problems.

Endothall is chemically related to cantharidin. Both compounds are protein phosphatase 2A inhibitors.

The disodium salt of Endothall is used clinically in China as an intravenous chemotherapeutic agent called "Disodium Norcantharidate Injection" (去甲斑蝥酸钠注射液).

== Toxicity ==
There is limited data on human toxicity, although cases of lethal deliberate self-poisoning have been reported with as little as a mouthful of Endothall concentrate.

Much like the related compound cantharidin, features of toxicity include chemical burns to the oropharynx and gastrointestinal tract, metabolic acidosis, coagulopathy, and multi-organ failure.

== See also ==
- Protein phosphatase
