= United Nations General Assembly Resolution 31/72 =

1976 resolution approving the Environmental Modification Convention

UN General Assembly Resolution 31/72
- Date: 10 December 1976
- Meeting no.: 31
- Code: A/RES/31/72 (Document)
- Subject: Environmental Modification Convention
- Voting summary: 96 voted for; 8 voted against; 30 abstained
- Result: Adopted

United Nations General Assembly Resolution 31/72 referred the Environmental Modification Convention (ENMOD) “to all States for their consideration, signature, and ratification”. The resolution was adopted on 10 December 1976 at the 31st Session of the UN General Assembly. The convention aims to prohibit the military or other hostile use of environmental modification techniques that have widespread, long-lasting, or severe effects. The convention entered into force on 5 October 1978.

== History ==
According to the historical narrative of the U.S. Department of State, "although the use of environmental modification techniques for hostile purposes does not play a major role in military planning at the present time," the U.S. Government sought that such techniques might be developed in the future and "would pose a threat of serious damage unless action was taken to prohibit their use." Accordingly, in July 1972, the U.S. Government renounced the use of climate modification techniques for hostile purposes, even if their development were proved to be feasible in the future. The following year, they called for international agreement to avoid the military use of environmental and geophysical modifications and, after exploring the possible uses, reached out to the former Soviet Union (USSR). In 1974 and 1975, U.S. President Richard Nixon and Soviet General Secretary Leonid Brezhnev held three sets of discussions on the issue. In 1975, the two nations began negotiating specific terms at the Conference of the Committee on Disarmament (CCD). Finalized in 1976, the agreed text was sent to the UN General Assembly for consideration during the fall session. On 10 December 1976, the resolution was approved with 96 to 8 votes, 30 abstaining.

== Environmental Modification Technique ==
In the treaty text "Environmental Modification Technique" is defined as follows:

As used in article I, the term "environmental modification techniques" refers to any technique for changing-through the deliberate manipulation of natural processes-the dynamics, composition or structure of the Earth, including its biota, lithosphere, hydrosphere and atmosphere, or of outer space.

— Article II, Environmental Modification Convention

== See also ==
- Arms control agreements
- Environmental agreements
- Climate engineering
