= Pee Wee =

Pee Wee, Peewee or Pee-wee may refer to:

== People and fictional characters ==
- Pee Wee (nickname), a list of people and fictional characters with the nickname
- Pee Wee (singer), stage name of the Mexican American singer and actor Irvin Salinas (born 1988)
- Pee Wee King, stage name of American country music singer-songwriter Julius Kuczynski (1914–1999)
- Peewee Longway, stage name of American rapper Quincy Lamont Williams (born 1984)
- Pee Wee Trahan and Johnny Rebel, stage names of American singer, songwriter and musician Clifford Trahan (1938–2016)
- Pee-wee Herman, a comedy character created and portrayed by American comedian Paul Reubens

== Birds ==
- Peewee, an alternative name in Australia for the Magpie-lark (Grallina cyanoleuca)
- Pewees, a group of songbirds from the New World

== Places in the United States ==
- Peewee, West Virginia, an unincorporated community
- Pee Wee Lake, California
- Pee Wee Point, a cape in West Virginia

== Sports and games ==
- Peewee, youth leagues in various sports in North America:
  - Peewee, a level in minor ice hockey for ages 11–12
  - Pee Wee, youth leagues in American football
  - Pee Wee, the youngest children’s basketball league
- Peawee, any small size of marble
- Pee-wee, an American variant of the cricket-like game gillidanda

== See also ==
- Northern lapwing or "peewit", a European plover
- Pee Vee (disambiguation)
- Peavey (disambiguation)
- PV (disambiguation)
