= Pseudomonas tremae =

Scientific classification
- Domain: Bacteria
- Kingdom: Pseudomonadati
- Phylum: Pseudomonadota
- Class: Gammaproteobacteria
- Order: Pseudomonadales
- Family: Pseudomonadaceae
- Genus: Pseudomonas
- Species: P. tremae

Binomial name
- Pseudomonas tremae Gardan, et al. 1999.

Synonyms
- Pseudomonas syringae pv. tremae Dye et al. 1980

Species of bacterium

Pseudomonas tremae is a white, Gram-negative, non-fluorescent, motile, flagellated, aerobic bacterium that infects Trema orientalis, from which it derives its name. It was formerly classified as a pathovar of Pseudomonas syringae, but following ribotypical analysis, it was instated as a species. The type strain is CFBP 3229.
