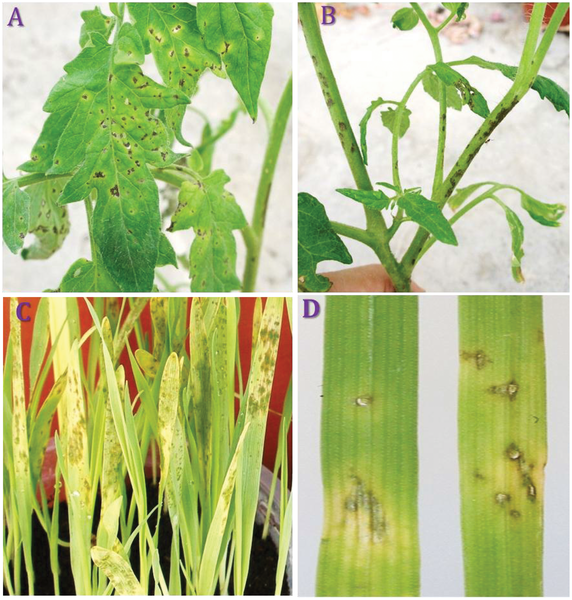

Scientific classification
- Domain: Bacteria
- Kingdom: Pseudomonadati
- Phylum: Pseudomonadota
- Class: Gammaproteobacteria
- Order: Pseudomonadales
- Family: Pseudomonadaceae
- Genus: Pseudomonas
- Species: P. cannabina

Binomial name
- Pseudomonas cannabina (ex Šutic and Dowson 1959); Gardan et al. 1999

Synonyms
- Pseudomonas cannabina Šutic and Dowson 1959; Pseudomonas syringae pv. cannabina Dye et al. 1980

= Pseudomonas cannabina =

Species of bacterium

Pseudomonas cannabina is a gray, Gram-negative, fluorescent, motile, flagellated, aerobic bacterium that causes leaf and stem rot of hemp (Cannabis sativa), from which it derives its name. It was formerly classified as a pathovar of Pseudomonas syringae, but following ribotypical analysis, it was reinstated as a species. The type strain is CFBP 2341.

== Hosts & symptoms ==
=== Classification issue ===
Pseudomonas cannabina was once classified as Pseudomonas syringae pv. cannabina, but after extensive DNA testing of several P. syringae pathovars, P. cannabina was declared its own species, known as genomospecies 9. P. cannabina turns out to have at least two pathovars of its own: P. cannabina pv. cannabina and P. cannabina pv. alisalensis (formerly known as P. syringae pv. alisalensis). This distinction is supported by a difference in host range between the pathovars as well as physiological differences including carbon source utilization, bacteriophage sensitivity, and pigment production. P. cannabina pv. cannabina has only been shown to be pathogenic on Cannabis sativa, while P. cannabina pv. alisalensis has been shown to be pathogenic on broccoli, broccoli raab, radish, arugula, and oat, and probably infects other crucifers and grains though identification is difficult given the genomic confusion in the literature. For example, P. cannabina pv. alisalensis has also been shown through Multi-Locus Sequence Analysis to be responsible for bacterial blights in crucifers formerly associated with the B70 strain of Pseudomonas syringae maculicola identified on radish in Wisconsin in 1965.

=== Signs and symptoms ===
In crucifers, P. cannabis pv. alisalensis causes a blight on the leaves (appearing similarly to those caused by P. syringae as well as the common fungal disease Brown Leaf Spot) The infection can be diagnosed by the following:

- Yellowing of leaves
- Small (2-5mm), angular, water-soaked lesions on foliage with chlorotic halos and tan or brown centers
- Eventual necrosis of lesions
- Blue-green fluorescence in cultivation

Overwatering and stress increase plant susceptibility.

In Cannabis, P. cannabina pv. cannabina causes stem and leaf rot of both industrial (hemp) and horticultural plants, producing similar symptoms to those observed in crucifers. Despite the fact that Pseudomonas bacterial blight is the most commonly documented disease of cannabis plants, the chlorotic lesions are often mistaken by horticultural growers for those of overwatering, nitrogen deficiency, phosphorus deficiency, or Septoria.

== Environment ==
=== Geographical range ===
Bacterial blight caused by P. cannabina pv. alisalensis has been reported in Greece, Germany, Australia, Japan, and several regions of the US including the Midwest, South, and Pacific Coast. Though some of these identifications were mislabeled as P. syringae pv. alisalensis, the indication that P. cannabina pv. alisalensis has a wide, intercontinental distribution is clear. The distribution of P. cannabina pv. cannabina is less obvious, because the fluctuating legal status of the host plant creates difficulty in researching the disease, though it is frequently referred to as a common bacterial blight in the available cannabis horticulture literature.

Bacterial blight in both hemp and crucifers is encouraged by cool, wet conditions in the range of 12–28 °C (54–82 °F), and is spread by water through irrigation of crops with a potential for seed transmission as well.

== Relevance ==
Humans have cultivated Cannabis sativa for thousands of years. Recently however, the legalization of cannabis for both recreational and medical use has come into the public eye in the US, as several states have moved to legalize the cultivation, research, and use of the plant. This burgeoning industry places a significant economic importance on diseases of the hemp plant in the global market, and education and control concerning possible crop impacts will be crucial as cannabis enters the mainstream economy. Globally, marijuana use, cultivation, and stigma differs from place to place, but the identification of geographic range and control measures for P. cannabina pv. cannabina will become more important as the legal status of hemp changes and widespread cultivation increases. While the virulence of P. cannabina pv. cannabina has not yet been studied extensively, a single square foot of marijuana plants can yield up to 6 ounces of sellable material which translates to a market value of roughly US$1800/sq ft, depending on strain and local market prices, so even a small overall yield loss due to blight has the potential to be financially devastating. Hemp grown for industrial use has a significantly lower value/area ratio but in a large-scale production situation, loss from disease could still be devastating.

Pseudomonas cannabina pv. alisalensis is already of great economic importance, as it affects many already-legal cruciferous horticultural crops worldwide and can severely damage or destroy the market value of an afflicted crop.
