= Pseudomonas coronafaciens =

Scientific classification
- Domain: Bacteria
- Kingdom: Pseudomonadati
- Phylum: Pseudomonadota
- Class: Gammaproteobacteria
- Order: Pseudomonadales
- Family: Pseudomonadaceae
- Genus: Pseudomonas
- Species: P. coronafaciens

Binomial name
- Pseudomonas coronafaciens (Elliott 1920); Stevens 1958

Type strain
- CFBP 2216 ICMP 3113; LMG 5060; NCPPB 600

Pathovars
- P. c. pv. atropurpurea P. c. pv. coronafaciens P. c. pv. garcae P. c. pv. oryzae P. c. pv. porri P. c. pv. striafaciens P. c. pv. zizaniae

Plant-pathogenic bacterium

Pseudomonas coronafaciens is a gram-negative bacterium that is pathogenic to several plant species. Following ribotypical analysis several pathovars of P. syringae were incorporated into this species.

== Hosts ==
- Pseudomonas coronafaciens pv. atropurpurea is pathogenic on Italian ryegrass (Lolium multiflorum, syn. Festuca perennis).
- Pseudomonas coronafaciens pv. coronafaciens causes halo blight on oat (Avena sativa).
- Pseudomonas coronafaciens pv. garcae infects the coffee plant Coffea arabica.
- Pseudomonas coronafaciens pv. oryzae is pathogenic on rice (Oryza sativa).
- Pseudomonas coronafaciens pv. porri infects the leek (Allium ampeloprasum var. porrum).
- Pseudomonas coronafaciens pv. striafaciens causes bacterial stripe blight on oat (Avena sativa).
- Pseudomonas coronafaciens pv. zizaniae causes bacterial leaf streak on wild rice (Zizania aquatica).

== Pathogenesis ==
P. coronafaciens performs quorum sensing by way of acylhomoserine lactone compounds. Cha et al., 1998 and Dumenyo et al., 1998 isolate and characterize some of these.
