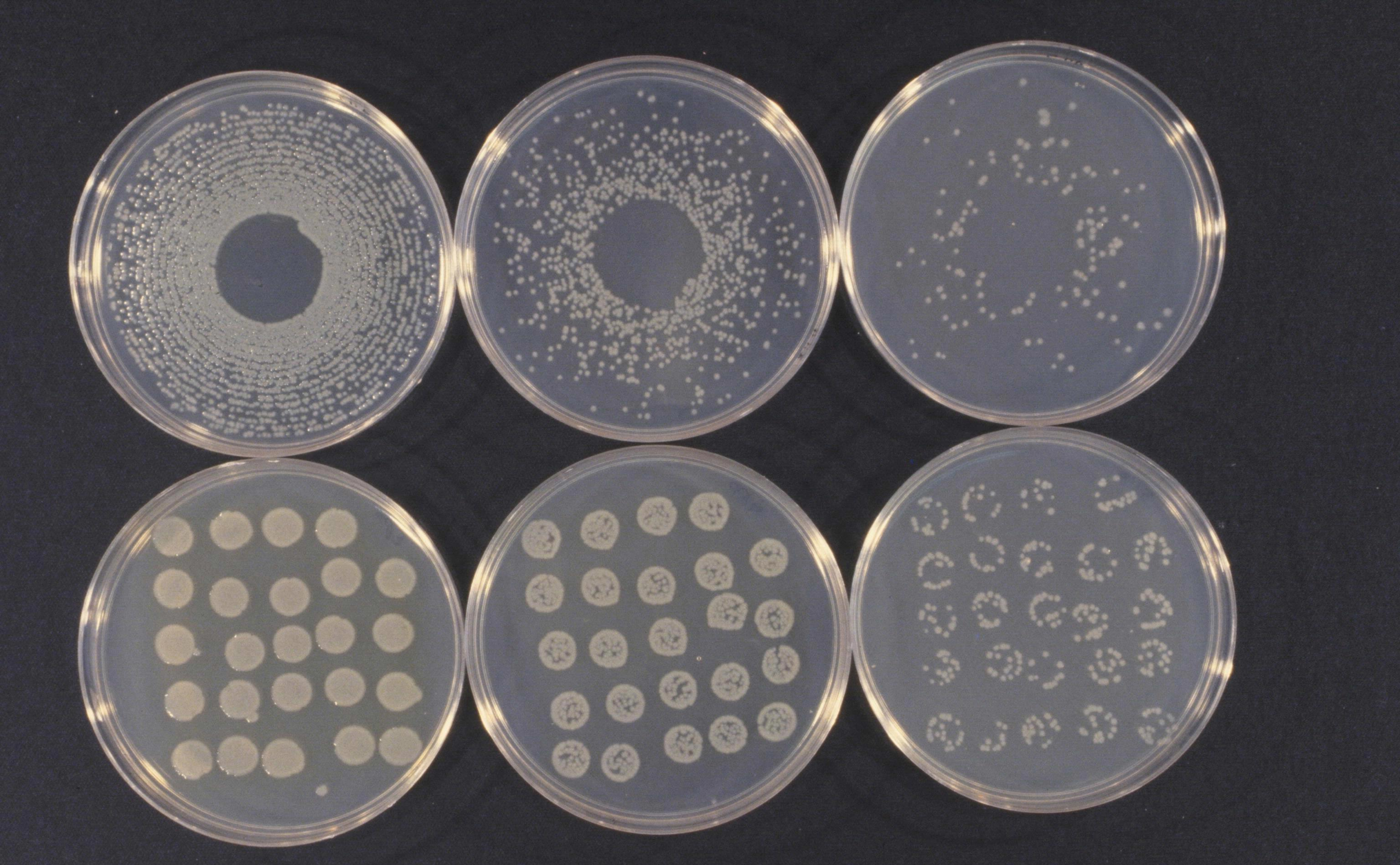
- Cultures of Pseudomonas syringae

Scientific classification
- Domain: Bacteria
- Kingdom: Pseudomonadati
- Phylum: Pseudomonadota
- Class: Gammaproteobacteria
- Order: Pseudomonadales
- Family: Pseudomonadaceae
- Genus: Pseudomonas
- Species: P. syringae

Binomial name
- Pseudomonas syringae Van Hall, 1904

Type strain
- ATCC 19310 CCUG 14279; CFBP 1392; CIP 106698; ICMP 3023; LMG 1247; NCAIM B.01398; NCPPB 281; NRRL B-1631

Pathovars
- P. s. pv. aceris P. s. pv. aptata P. s. pv. atrofaciens P. s. pv. dysoxylis P. s. pv. japonica P. s. pv. lapsa P. s. pv. panici P. s. pv. papulans P. s. pv. persicae (Prunier, Luisetti &. Gardan) Young, Dye & Wilkie; P. s. pv. pisi P. s. pv. syringae P. s. pv. morsprunorum

= Pseudomonas syringae =

Species of bacterium

Pseudomonas syringae is a rod-shaped, Gram-negative bacterium with polar flagella. As a plant pathogen, it can infect a wide range of species, and exists as over 50 different pathovars, all of which are available to researchers from international culture collections such as the NCPPB, ICMP, and others.

Pseudomonas syringae is a member of the genus Pseudomonas, and based on 16S rRNA analysis, it has been placed in the P. syringae group. It is named after the lilac tree (Syringa vulgaris), from which it was first isolated.

A phylogenomic analysis of 494 complete genomes from the entire Pseudomonas genus showed that P. syringae does not form a monophyletic species in the strict sense, but a wider evolutionary group that also included other species as well, such as P. avellanae, P. savastanoi, P. amygdali, and P. cerasi.

Pseudomonas syringae tests negative for arginine dihydrolase and oxidase activity, and forms the polymer levan on sucrose nutrient agar. Many, but not all, strains secrete the lipopeptide plant toxin syringomycin, and it owes its yellow fluorescent appearance when cultured in vitro on King's B medium to production of the siderophore pyoverdin.

Pseudomonas syringae also produces ice nucleation active (INA) proteins which cause water (in plants) to freeze at fairly high temperatures (−1.8 to −3.8 °C (28.8 to 25.2 °F)), resulting in injury. Since the 1970s, P. syringae has been implicated as an atmospheric biological ice nucleator, with airborne bacteria serving as cloud condensation nuclei. Recent evidence has suggested the species plays a larger role than previously thought in producing rain and snow. They have also been found in the cores of hailstones, aiding in bioprecipitation. These INA proteins are also used in making artificial snow.

Pseudomonas syringae pathogenesis is dependent on effector proteins secreted into the plant cell by the bacterial type III secretion system. 70 different type III effector families encoded by hop genes have been identified in P. syringae. Type III effectors contribute to pathogenesis chiefly through their role in suppressing plant defense. Owing to early availability of the genome sequence for three P. syringae strains and the ability of selected strains to cause disease on well-characterized host plants, including Arabidopsis thaliana, Nicotiana benthamiana, and the tomato, P. syringae has come to represent an important model system for experimental characterization of the molecular dynamics of plant-pathogen interactions.

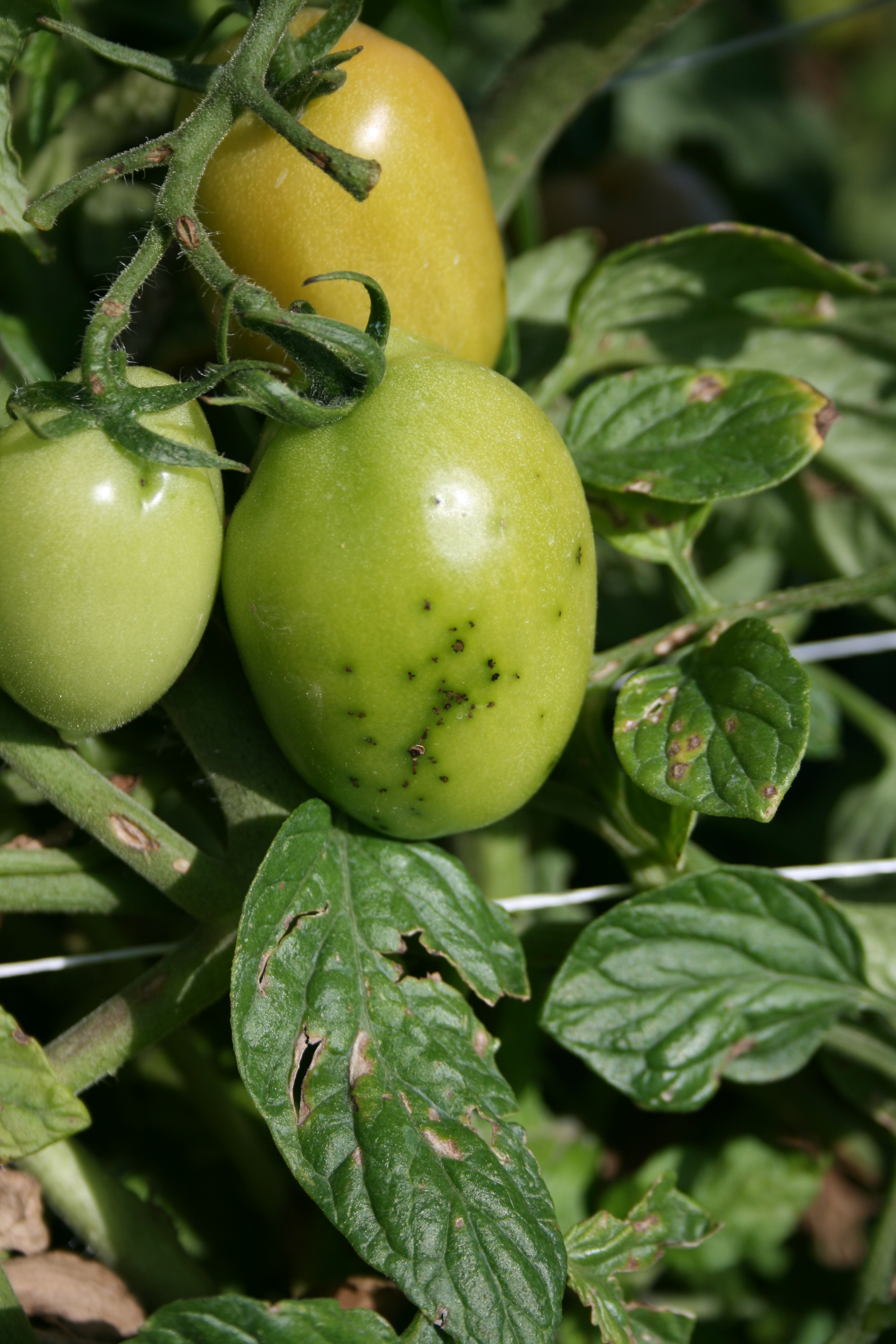
Bacterial speck on tomato in Upstate New York

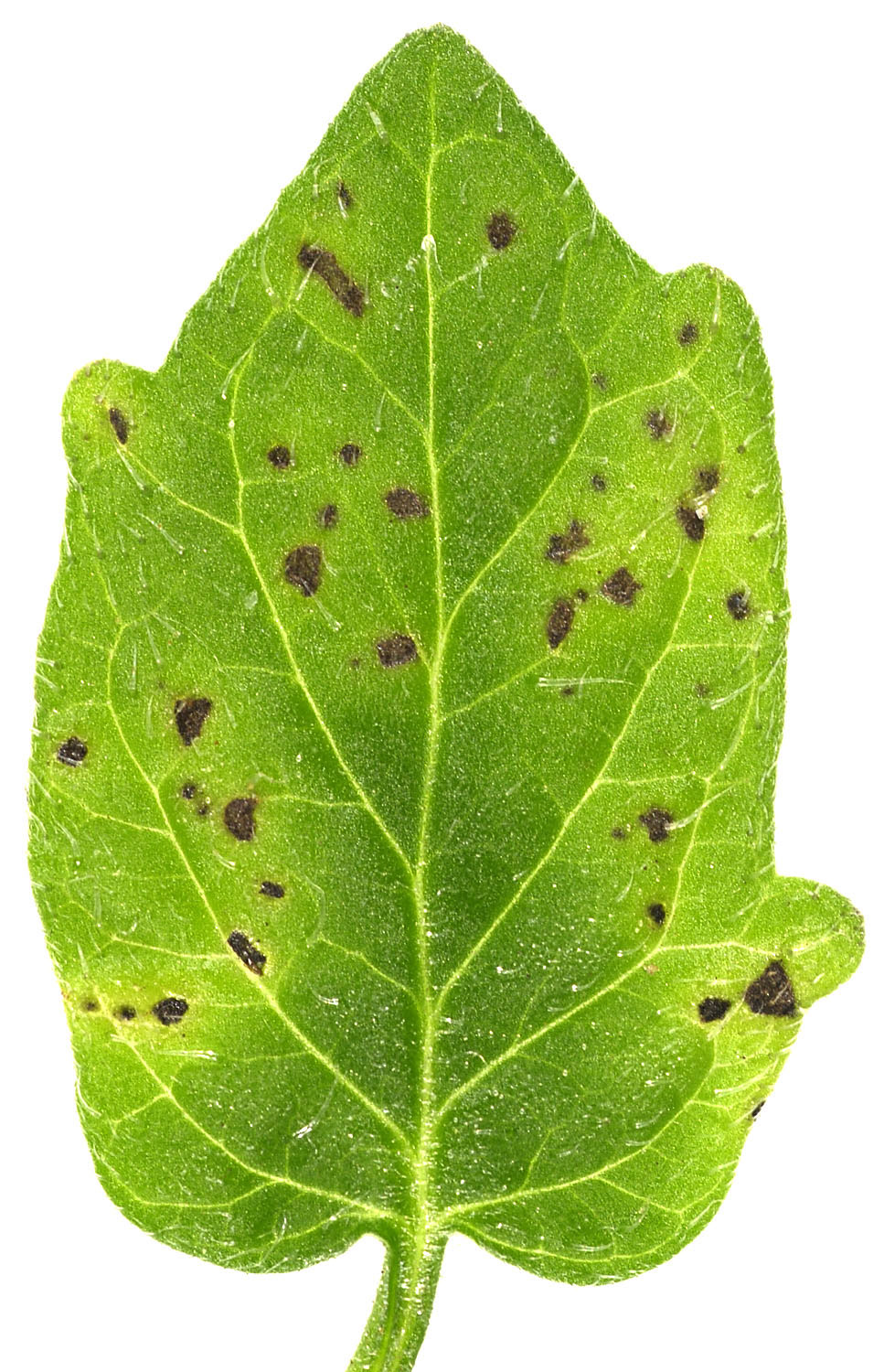
Tomato plant leaf infected with bacterial speck

== History ==
In 1961, Paul Hoppe of the U.S. Department of Agriculture studied a corn fungus by grinding up infected leaves each season, then applying the powder to test corn for the following season to track the disease. A surprise frost occurred that year, leaving peculiar results. Only plants infected with the diseased powder incurred frost damage, leaving healthy plants unfrozen. This phenomenon baffled scientists until graduate student Steven E. Lindow of the University of Wisconsin–Madison with D.C. Arny and C. Upper found a bacterium in the dried leaf powder in the early 1970s. Steven E. Lindow, now a plant pathologist at the University of California, Berkeley, found that when this particular bacterium was introduced to plants where it is originally absent, the plants became very vulnerable to frost damage. He went on to identify the bacterium as P. syringae, investigate the role of P. syringae in ice nucleation and in 1977, discover the mutant ice-minus strain. He was later successful at producing the ice-minus strain of P. syringae through recombinant DNA technology, as well.

== Genomics ==
Based on a comparative genomic and phylogenomic analysis of 494 complete genomes from the entire Pseudomonas genus, P. syringae does not form a monophyletic species in the strict sense, but a wider evolutionary group (34 genomes in total, organized into 3 subgroups) that includes other species as well. The core proteome of the P. syringae group comprised 2944 proteins, whereas the protein count and GC content of the strains of this group ranged between 4973 and 6026 (average: 5465) and between 58 and 59.3% (average: 58.6%), respectively.

== Disease cycle ==
Pseudomonas syringae overwinters on infected plant tissues such as regions of necrosis or gummosis (sap oozing from wounds on the tree) but can also overwinter in healthy looking plant tissues. In the spring, water from rain or other sources will wash the bacteria onto leaves/blossoms where it will grow and survive throughout the summer. This is the epiphyte phase of P. syringae's life cycle where it will multiply and spread but will not cause a disease. Once it enters the plant through a leaf's stomata or necrotic spots on either leaves or woody tissue then the disease will start. The pathogen will then exploit and grow in intercellular space causing the leaf spots and cankers. P. syringae can also survive in temperatures slightly below freezing. These below freezing temperatures increase the severity of infection within trees like sour cherry, apricot, and peach.

== Epidemiology ==
Diseases caused by P. syringae tend to be favoured by wet, cool conditions—optimum temperatures for disease tend to be around 12–25 °C (54–77 °F), although this can vary according to the pathovar involved. The bacteria tend to be seed-borne, and are dispersed between plants by rain splash.

Although it is a plant pathogen, it can also live as a saprotroph in the phyllosphere when conditions are not favourable for disease. Some saprotrophic strains of P. syringae have been used as biocontrol agents against postharvest rots.

== Mechanisms of pathogenicity ==
The mechanisms of P. syringae pathogenicity can be separated into several categories: ability to invade a plant, ability to overcome host resistance, biofilm formation, and production of proteins with ice-nucleating properties.

=== Ability to invade plants ===
Planktonic P. syringae is able to enter plants using its flagella and pili to swim towards a target host. It enters the plant via wounds of natural opening sites, as it is not able to breach the plant cell wall. An example of this is the partnership with the leaf-mining fly Scaptomyza flava, which creates holes in leaves during oviposition that the pathogen can take advantage of. The role of taxis in P. syringae has not been well-studied, but the bacteria are thought to use chemical signals released by the plant to find their host and cause infection.

=== Overcoming host resistance ===
==== Effectors ====
Pseudomonas syringae isolates carry a range of virulence factors called type III secretion system (T3SS) effector proteins. These proteins primarily function to cause disease symptoms and manipulate the host's immune response to facilitate infection. The major family of T3SS effectors in P. syringae is the hrp gene cluster, coding for the Hrp secretion apparatus.

===== Hop effectors =====
HopZ1s are type III effectors which interfere with the Glycine max 2-hydroxyisoflavanone dehydratase (GmHID1). HopZ1b degrades daidzein after production, reducing concentrations and thus reducing the immunity it provides the plant.

==== Phytotoxins ====
The pathogens also produce phytotoxins which injure the plant and can suppress the host immune system. One such phytotoxin is coronatine, found in pathovars Pto and Pgl.

==== Elicitors ====
Pst DC3000 produces a PsINF1, the INF1 in P. syringae. Hosts respond with autophagy upon detection of this elicitor. Liu et al. 2005 finds this to be the only alternative to mass hypersensitivity leading to mass programmed cell death.

=== Biofilm formation ===
Pseudomonas syringae produces polysaccharides which allow it to adhere to the surface of plant cells. It also releases quorum sensing molecules, which allows it to sense the presence of other bacterial cells nearby. If these molecules pass a threshold level, the bacteria change their pattern of gene expression to form a biofilm and begin expression of virulence-related genes. The bacteria secrete highly viscous compounds such as polysaccharides and DNA to create a protective environment in which to grow.

=== Ice-nucleating properties ===
Pseudomonas syringae—more than any mineral or other organism—is responsible for the surface frost damage in plants exposed to the environment. For plants without antifreeze proteins, frost damage usually occurs between −4 and −12 °C (25 and 10 °F) as the water in plant tissue can remain in a supercooled liquid state. P. syringae can cause water to freeze at temperatures as high as −1.8 °C (28.8 °F), but strains causing ice nucleation at lower temperatures (down to −8 °C (18 °F)) are more common. The freezing causes injuries in the epithelia and makes the nutrients in the underlying plant tissues available to the bacteria.

Pseudomonas syringae has ina (ice nucleation-active) genes that make INA proteins which translocate to the outer bacterial membrane on the surface of the bacteria, where the proteins act as nuclei for ice formation. Artificial strains of P. syringae known as ice-minus bacteria have been created to reduce frost damage.

Pseudomonas syringae has been found in the center of hailstones, suggesting the bacterium may play a role in Earth's hydrological cycle.

== Management ==
Currently there is not a 100% effective way to eradicate P. syringae from a field. The most common way to control this pathogen is to spray bactericides with copper compounds or other heavy metals that can be combined with fungicides or other pest control chemicals. Chemical treatments with fixed copper such as Bordeaux, copper hydroxide, and cupric sulfate are used to stop the spread of P. syringae by killing the bacteria while it is in the epiphyte stage on leaves, or woody parts of trees—however resistant P. syringae strains do exist. Spraying antibiotics such as streptomycin and organic bactericides is another way to control P. syringae but is less common than the methods listed above.

New research has shown that adding ammonium (NH_{4}^{+}) nutrition to tomato plants can cause a metabolic change leading to resistance against Pseudomonas syringae. This "ammonium syndrome" causes nutrient imbalances in the plant and therefore triggers a defense response against the pathogen.

Strict hygiene practices used in orchards along with pruning in early spring and summer were proven to make the trees more resistant to P. syringae. Cauterizing cankers found on orchard trees can save the tree's life by stopping the infection from spreading.

Breeding plants for resistance is another somewhat effective way to avoid P. syringae. It has been successful in the cherry rootstock with Pseudomonas syringae pv. syringae, but so far, no other species are 100% resistant to this pathogen. Resistance breeding is a slow process, especially in trees. P. syringae bacteria can adapt genetically to infect resistant plants, and the process for resistance breeding has to start over again.

A combination treatment of bacteriophage and carvacrol shows promise in control of both the planktonic and biofilm forms.

== Pathovars ==
Following ribotype analysis, incorporation of several pathovars of P. syringae into other species was proposed (see P. amygdali, 'P. tomato', P. coronafaciens, P. avellanae, 'P. helianthi', P. tremae, P. cannabina, and P. viridiflava). According to this schema, the remaining pathovars are:

- P. s. pv. aceris attacks maple Acer species.
- P. s. pv. actinidiae attacks kiwifruit Actinidia chinensis.
- P. s. pv. aesculi attacks horse chestnut Aesculus hippocastanum, causing bleeding canker.
- P. s. pv. aptata attacks beets Beta vulgaris.
- P. s. pv. atrofaciens attacks wheat Triticum aestivum.
- P. s. pv. dysoxylis attacks the kohekohe tree Dysoxylum spectabile.
- P. s. pv. glycinea attacks soybean Glycine max, causing bacterial blight of soybean.
- P. s. pv. japonica attacks barley Hordeum vulgare.
- P. s. pv. lapsa attacks wheat Triticum aestivum.
- P. s. pv. panici attacks Panicum grass species.
- P. s. pv. papulans attacks crabapple Malus sylvestris species.
- P. s. pv. persicae attacks nectarine and peach.
- P. s. pv. phaseolicola causes halo blight of beans.
- P. s. pv. pisi attacks peas Pisum sativum.
- P. s. pv. syringae attacks Syringa, Prunus, and Phaseolus species.
- P. s. pv. tomato attacks tomato.

However, many of the strains for which new species groupings were proposed continue to be referred to in the scientific literature as pathovars of P. syringae, including pathovars tomato, phaseolicola, and maculicola. Pseudomonas savastanoi was once considered a pathovar or subspecies of P. syringae, and in many places continues to be referred to as P. s. pv. savastanoi, although as a result of DNA-relatedness studies, it has been instated as a new species. It has three host-specific pathovars: P. s. fraxini (which causes ash canker), P. s. nerii (which attacks oleander), and P. s. oleae (which causes olive knot).

=== Determinants of host specificity ===
A combination of the pathogen's effector genes and the plant's resistance genes is thought to determine which species a particular pathovar can infect. Plants can develop resistance to a pathovar by recognising pathogen-associated molecular patterns (PAMPs) and launching an immune response. These PAMPs are necessary for the microbe to function, so cannot be lost, but the pathogen may find ways to suppress this immune response, leading to an evolutionary arms race between the pathogen and the host.

== Pseudomonas syringae as a model system ==
Owing to early availability of genome sequences for P. syringae pv. tomato strain DC3000, P. syringae pv. syringae strain B728a, and P. syringae pv. phaseolicola strain 1448A, together with the ability of selected strains to cause disease on well-characterized host plants such as Arabidopsis thaliana, Nicotiana benthamiana, and tomato, P. syringae has come to represent an important model system for experimental characterization of the molecular dynamics of plant-pathogen interactions. The P. syringae experimental system has been a source of pioneering evidence for the important role of pathogen gene products in suppressing plant defense. The nomenclature system developed for P. syringae effectors has been adopted by researchers characterizing effector repertoires in other bacteria, and methods used for bioinformatic effector identification have been adapted for other organisms. In addition, researchers working with P. syringae have played an integral role in the Plant-Associated Microbe Gene Ontology working group, aimed at developing gene ontology terms that capture biological processes occurring during the interactions between organisms, and using the terms for annotation of gene products.

=== Pseudomonas syringae pv. tomato strain DC3000 and Arabidopsis thaliana ===
As mentioned above, the genome of P. syringae pv. tomato DC3000 has been sequenced, and approximately 40 Hop (Hrp Outer Protein) effectors—pathogenic proteins that attenuate the host cell—have been identified. These 40 effectors are not recognized by A. thaliana thus making P. syringae pv. tomato DC3000 virulent against it—that is, P. syringae pv. tomato DC3000 is able to infect A. thaliana—thus A. thaliana is susceptible to this pathogen.

Many gene-for-gene relationships have been identified using the two model organisms, P. syringae pv. tomato strain DC3000 and Arabidopsis. The gene-for-gene relationship describes the recognition of pathogenic avirulence (avr) genes by host resistance genes (R-genes). P. syringae pv. tomato DC3000 is a useful tool for studying avr: R-gene interactions in A. thaliana because it can be transformed with avr genes from other bacterial pathogens, and furthermore, because none of the endogenous hops genes is recognized by A. thaliana, any observed avr recognition identified using this model can be attributed to recognition of the introduced avr by A. thaliana. The transformation of P. syringae pv. tomato DC3000 with effectors from other pathogens have led to the identification of many R-genes in Arabidopsis to further advance knowledge of plant pathogen interactions.

Examples of avr genes in P. syringae DC3000 and A. thaliana R-genes that recognize them
Avr gene	A. thaliana R-gene
AvrB	RPM1
AvrRpm1	RPM1
AvrRpt2	RPS2
AvrRps4	RPS4
AvrRps6	RPS6
AvrPphB	RPS5/RESISTANCE TO PSEUDOMONAS SYRINGAE 5 (see also Arabidopsis thaliana § RPS5)

The Dynamin-related protein 2b/drp2b gene in A. thaliana is not directly an immunity gene, but by helping move external material into the intracellular network is indirectly related, and some mutants increase susceptibility.

=== Pseudomonas syringae pv. tomato strain DC3000, its derivatives, and its tomato host ===
As its name suggests, P. syringae pv. tomato DC3000 (Pst DC3000) is virulent to tomato (Solanum lycopersicum). However, the tomato cultivar Rio Grande-PtoR (RG-PtoR), harboring the resistance gene Pto, recognizes key effectors secreted by Pst DC3000, making it resistant to the bacteria. Studying the interactions between the Pto-expressing tomato lines and Pst DC3000 and its pathovars is a powerful system for understanding plant-microbe interactions.

Like other plants, the tomato has a two-tier pathogen defense system. The first and more universal line of plant defense, pattern-triggered immunity (PTI), is activated when plant pattern recognition receptors (PRRs) on the cell surface bind to pathogen-associated molecular patterns (PAMPs). The other branch of plant immunity, effector-triggered immunity (ETI), is triggered when intracellular (Nucleotide-binding site, Leucine-rich repeat) NB-LRR proteins bind to an effector, a molecule specific to a particular pathogen. ETI is generally more severe than PTI, and when a threshold of defense activation is reached, it can trigger a hypersensitive response (HR), which is purposeful death of host tissue to prevent the spread of infection. Two key effectors secreted by Pst DC3000 are AvrPto and AvrPtoB, which initiate ETI by binding the Pto/Prf receptor complex in Pto-expressing tomato lines like RG-PtoR.

Pst DC3000 has been modified to create the mutant strain Pst DC3000∆avrPto∆avrPtoB (Pst DC3000∆∆), which expresses neither AvrPto nor AvrPtoB. By infecting RG-PtoR with Pst DC3000∆∆, ETI to the pathogen is not triggered due to the absence of the main effectors recognized by the Pto/Prf complex. In the lab this is highly valuable, as using Pst DC3000∆∆ allows researchers to study the function of PTI-candidate genes in RG-PtoR, which would otherwise be masked by ETI.

Another useful DC3000 derivative is Pst DC3000∆avrPto∆avrPtoB∆fliC (Pst DC3000∆∆∆). Like Pst DC3000∆∆, this strain does not express AvrPto and AvrPtoB, but it also has an additional knock-out for fliC, the gene encoding flagellin, whose fragments serve as main PAMPs required for tomato PTI. By comparing plants within the same line that have been infected with either Pst DC3000∆∆ or Pst DC3000∆∆∆, researchers can determine if genes of interest are important to the flagellin recognition pathway of PTI.

By treating CRISPR-induced tomato knockout mutants (in a RG-PtoR background) with Pst DC3000, Pst DC3000∆avrPto∆avrPtoB, or Pst DC3000∆avrPto∆avrPtoB∆fliC has led to the characterization of key components of the tomato immune system and continues to be used to further the field of tomato pathology.

== Importance ==
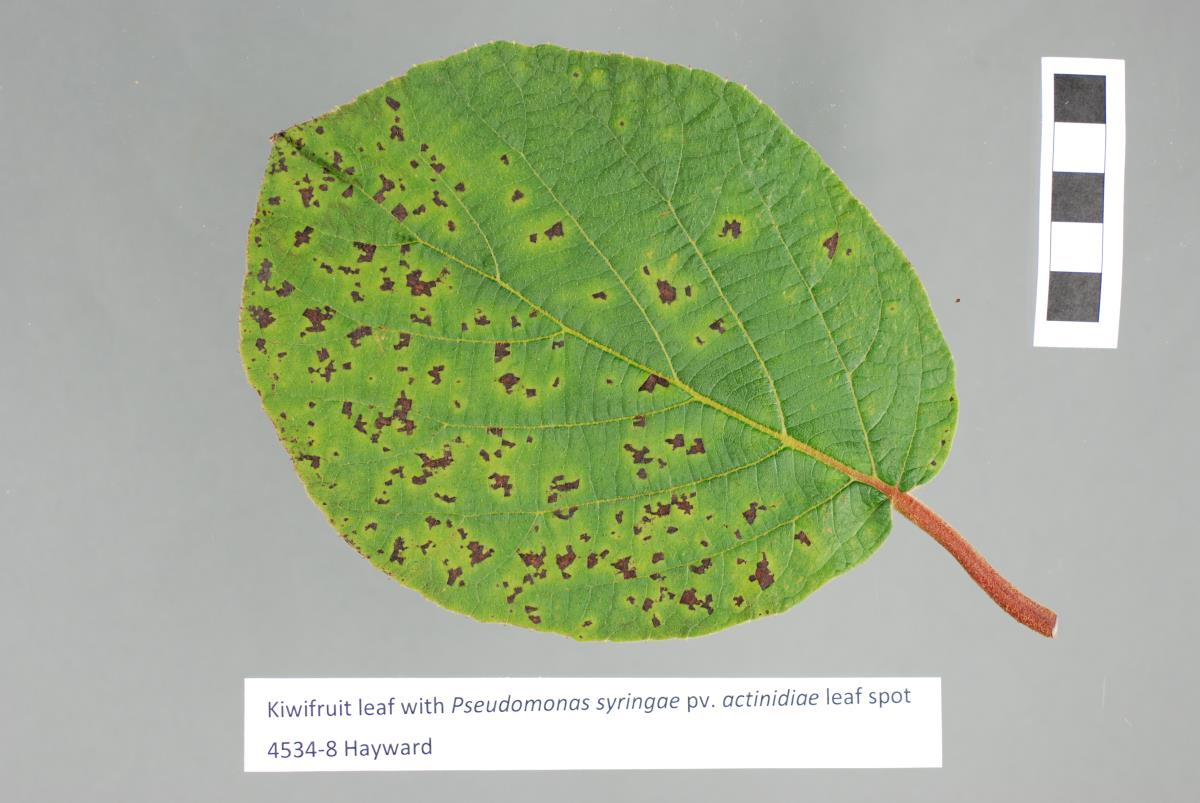
P. s. pv. actinidiae infecting a kiwifruit leaf

Pseudomonas syringae has impacted many crop and orchard industries with its various pathovars.

=== P. s. pv. actinidiae ===
Mesarich et al. 2017 provides several libraries for transposon insertion sequencing of mutants of P. s. a.

The kiwifruit industry in New Zealand has suffered catastrophic losses since their first known outbreak in 2007 from P. syringae pv. actinidiae. New Zealand is second to Italy in the total volume of kiwifruit exports making an annual revenue of $NZ 1 billion, making it the most economically valuable export in the country. In 2014 the loss of exports alone was as high as NZ$930 million. Growers had to pay for treatments, and removal of infected vines along with suffering the loss of capital value in their orchards. For some, the orchard values went from NZ$450,000/ha to $70,000/ha after the outbreak, which is the price of bare land. The total loss of equity for the country of New Zealand was as high as NZ$2 billion.

Between 2010 and 2012 over 2,000 hectares (4,900 acres) of Italian kiwifruit orchards either were killed by P. syringae pv. actinidiae or were killed to contain the disease. The financial consequences for growers and their suppliers were severe, as were the economic consequences more widely.

== See also ==
- Bioprecipitation
- Ice-minus bacteria
- Pseudomonas phage Φ6
- National Collection of Plant Pathogenic Bacteria
