= PV =

PV may refer to:

== Places ==
- Paceville, Malta
- Puerto Vallarta, Mexico
- Postal village, a settlement that has a post office

=== United States ===
- Palos Verdes Peninsula, California
- Prescott Valley, Arizona
- Prairie Village, Kansas

== Politics ==
- Partido Verde (disambiguation), several political parties
- Peoples Voice, a political party in Singapore
- Preferential voting (disambiguation), a category of electoral systems

== Science and technology ==
- Photovoltaics, a technology for converting sunlight into electricity
- Potential vorticity, in fluid dynamics
- Presta valve, one of the two common tire valves
- Process variable, in control systems
- Programmed visibility, of traffic signals

=== Biology and medicine ===
- Parvalbumin, a calcium-binding albumin protein
- Pathovar, a bacterial strain or set of strains with the same or similar characteristics
- Pemphigus vulgaris, a chronic blistering skin disease
- Per vaginam, through/via the vagina
- Periventricular nucleus, of the hypothalamus
- Pharmacovigilance, a science of pharmaceutical products
- Poliovirus, the causative agent of polio
- Polycythemia vera, a condition in which there is an increase in the number of red blood cells in the body
- Pyrovalerone, a stimulant drug

=== Chemistry ===
- Pressure and volume, for example in the ideal gas equation (PV=nRT)
- Protecting group, as Pv, Pivaloyl
- Peroxide value
- Perovskite (Pv), a mineral

=== Computing ===
- Page view, a metric in web analytics
- Semaphore (programming), from P and V operations in semaphores restricting processes in a shared environment
- Paravirtualization, a technique for the virtualization of guest operating systems in virtual machines

=== Mathematics ===
- Principal value, a single-valued function in complex analysis
- Principal variation, the sequence of moves in a game tree currently believed to represent best play; see Variation (game tree)
- Cauchy principal value, a method for assigning values to certain improper integrals which would otherwise be undefined
- Pisot–Vijayaraghavan number (PV-number), a real algebraic integer

== Sports ==
- Pickleball Victoria, an Australian state level organization
- Port Vale F.C., an English football club
- "Pole vault" athletics abbreviation in track and field

== Transportation ==
- Pallavaram railway station, Chennai, Tamil Nadu, India (Southern Railway station code)
- Pasažieru vilciens, a Latvian passenger-carrying railway company
- PV-1 Ventura, a World War II-era bomber and patrol aircraft
- PAN Air (IATA airline designator)
- Volvo PV, an automobile

== Other uses ==
- Personal vaporizer or electronic cigarette
- P. V. Narasimha Rao (1921–2004), former Prime Minister of India, known as PV
- Point of view (literature)
- Powerviolence, a subgenre of hardcore punk music
- Prairie Vista Elementary School, Indiana, US
- Present value, of money
- Prometheus Bound, an ancient Greek tragedy commonly abbreviated as PV, on the basis of its Latin title Prometheus Vinctus
- Promotional video (disambiguation)

== See also ==
- Methylenedioxypyrovalerone (MDPV), a chemical
- alpha-Pyrrolidinopentiophenone (a-PVP), a chemical
- Pee Vee (disambiguation)
- Peavey (disambiguation)
