= Peavey =

Peavey may refer to:

- Peavey (surname)
- Peavey (tool), a logging tool
- Peavey Electronics, an American audio equipment manufacturer
- Peavey Company, a former name of Gavilon, an American commodity management firm

== See also ==
- Peavy (disambiguation)
- Pee Vee (disambiguation)
- Pee Wee (disambiguation)
- PV (disambiguation)
