= D-lactate-2-sulfatase =

Class of enzymes

Identifiers
- EC no.: 3.1.6.17
- CAS no.: 93586-05-1

Databases
- BRENDA: enzyme data
- ExPASy: NiceZyme view
- KEGG: enzyme entry
- MetaCyc: metabolic pathway
- Rhea: reactions
- PDB structures: RCSB PDB PDBe PDBsum
- Gene Ontology: AmiGO / QuickGO
Search
- PMC: articles
- PubMed: articles
- NCBI: proteins

The enzyme D-lactate-2-sulfatase (EC 3.1.6.17) catalyzes the reaction

(R)-2-O-sulfolactic acid
H_{2}O
H_{2}SO_{4}
(R)-lactic acid

The enzyme characterised from Pseudomonas syringae hydrolyses (R)-2-O-sulfolactic acid to (R)-lactic acid and sulfate.

This enzyme is a hydrolase, specifically one acting on sulfuric ester bonds. The systematic name is (R)-2-O-sulfolactate 2-sulfohydrolase. Another name (S)-2-O-sulfolactate 2-sulfohydrolase specifies the stereochemistry incorrectly.
