= Bioprecipitation =

Bacterial rain-making process

Bioprecipitation is the concept of rain-making bacteria and was proposed by David Sands from Montana State University in the 1970s. This is precipitation that is beneficial for microbial and plant growth, it is a feedback cycle beginning with land plants generating small air-borne particles called aerosols that contain microorganisms that influence the formation of clouds by their ice nucleation properties. The formation of ice in clouds is required for snow and most rainfall. Dust and soot particles can serve as ice nuclei, but biological ice nuclei are capable of catalyzing freezing at much warmer temperatures. The ice-nucleating bacteria currently known are mostly plant pathogens. Recent research suggests that bacteria may be present in clouds as part of an evolved process of dispersal.

Ice-nucleating proteins derived from ice-nucleating bacteria are used for snowmaking. A symbiotic relationship between sulphate reducing, lead reducing, sulphur oxidizing, and denitrifying bacteria was found to be responsible for biotransformation and bioprecipitation.

== Plant pathogens ==
Most known ice-nucleating bacteria are plant pathogens. These pathogens can cause freezing injury in plants. In the United States alone, it has been estimated that frost accounts for approximately $1 billion in crop damage each year. The ice-minus variant of P. syringae is a mutant, lacking the gene responsible for ice-nucleating surface protein production. This lack of surface protein provides a less favorable environment for ice formation. Both strains of P. syringae occur naturally, but recombinant DNA technology has allowed for the synthetic removal or alteration of specific genes, enabling the creation of the ice-minus strain. The introduction of an ice-minus strain of P. syringae to the surface of plants would incur competition between the strains. Should the ice-minus strain win out, the ice nucleate provided by P. syringae would no longer be present, lowering the level of frost development on plant surfaces at normal water freezing temperature (0 °C).

== Dispersal of bacteria through rainfall ==
Bacteria present in clouds may have evolved to use rainfall as a means of dispersing themselves into the environment. The bacteria are found in snow, soils and seedlings in locations, such as, Antarctica, the Yukon Territory of Canada and the French Alps, according to Brent Christner, a microbiologist at Louisiana State University. It has been suggested that the bacteria are part of a constant feedback loop between terrestrial ecosystems and clouds. According to Christine, this bacteria may rely on the rainfall to spread to new habitats, in much the same way as plants rely on windblown pollen grains, which could possibly a key element of the bacterial life cycle.

== Biology ==
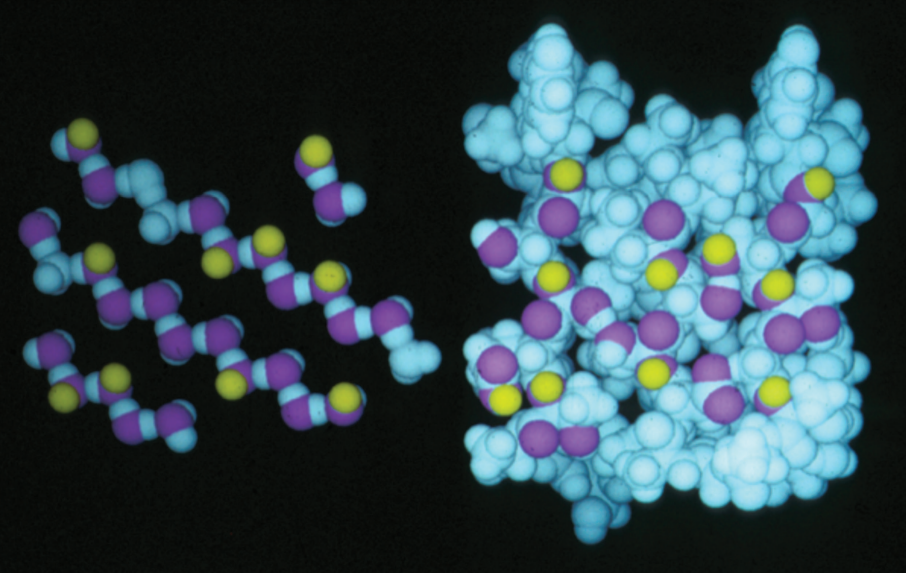
Space-filling model of the proposed three-dimensional structure of the ice nucleation protein from P. syringae.

The bacteria P. syringae use the protein inaZ to trigger ice nucleation. The pathogen uses it primarily to raise the temperature at which plants freeze in order to kill and infect them, but it is also used to trigger the formation of snowflakes within clouds. The bacteria produce more of the protein when exposed to colder temperatures. This causes them to trigger precipitation when exposed to high altitude conditions.

Some strains of P. syringae have a number of adaptations that suggest they have evolved to utilize bioprecipitation. The bacteria contain pigments used to resist UV radiation damage, and are highly UV resistant. Certain strains are also resistant to desiccation at the low humidity conditions found at high altitude.

== The bioprecipitation cycle ==
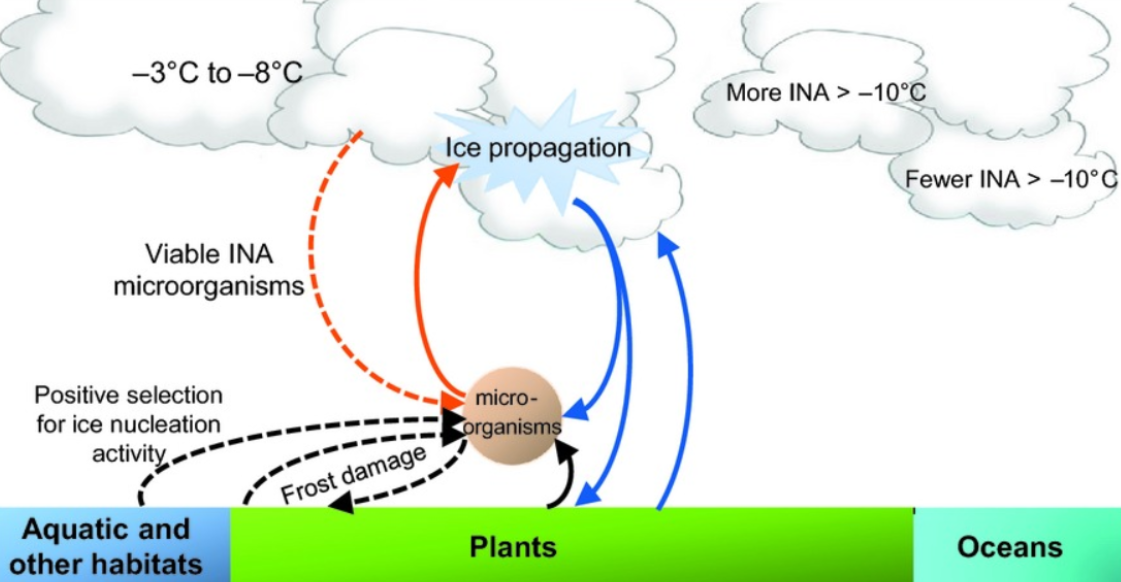
Diagram of the bioprecipitation cycle.

Bacteria are released into the air through leaf litter, fungal spores, and aerosol droplets, where they ascend into the atmosphere through updrafts, most frequently those produced during thunderstorms. Ice nucleating bacteria become concentrated within clouds and trigger precipitation.

The presence of these bacteria can raise the temperature at which snowflakes form spontaneously within clouds from around -40°, to temperatures near 0° Celsius. This leads to increased precipitation, especially at mid to high latitudes, where the majority of rainfall starts as snow that melts on its way down. Ice nucleation in clouds can also be triggered by dust, smoke, and pollen, but biological ice nucleators are thought to contribute to the majority.

The bacteria return to the ground through this precipitation, where they infect new plants. This feeds a cycle where the bacteria are dispersed through rainfall, and propagate and reproduce through plant infection. Increased populations of the bacteria within an area cause a greater flux of the bacteria into the atmosphere, which then causes increased rainfall. This allows the bacteria to spread further, and the increased moisture caused by rainfall makes plant infection easier.

This cycle may have a considerable effect on precipitation rates, mainly in mid-latitude regions, and suggest that this cycle may date back to the formation of modern atmospheric circulation patterns around 100 million years ago, though the magnitude of the effect is still debated.

== Research ==
The transmission of plant pathogens through the atmosphere was first observed by professor David Sands in 1978 while investigating outbreaks of P. Syringae in wheat fields in Montana. The pathogen was not found in soil or irrigation water samples, and did not seem to emanate from a specific point source. Bacteria was found however, in air samples from above the farmland. This led him to theorize that the bacteria travelled through rain water as part of their life cycle.

In the following decades, the bacteria was found in rain and snowfall samples in North America, Europe, and Antarctica. From this, a more detailed model of the bioprecipitation cycle could be hypothesized. The bacteria was later found in direct cloud samples.

P. syringae has also been discovered in hailstones. Ice nucleating proteins are much more concentrated in the centers of hailstones, indicating their effect on their formation.

== Snowmaking ==
Certain species of bacteria and fungi are known to act as efficient biological ice nuclei at temperatures between −10 and 0 °C. Without ice nuclear agents, to freeze water the temperature has to be at least −40 °C. But ice nucleating bacteria can freeze at −1 °C instead of −40 °C. Even after the death of the bacteria, the glycoproteins continue ice crystallization. It does so by mimicking ice at the site of ice nucleating sites, which it acts as a template for the formation of ice lattice. Many ski resorts use a commercially available freeze-dried preparation of ice-nucleating proteins derived from the bacterium species Pseudomonas syringae to make snow in a snowgun. Pseudomonas syringae is a well studied plant pathogen that can infect plants, which results in loss. By studying this pathogen it can help us understand the plant immune system.

== Fungal contributions to bioprecipitation ==
Early studies of biological ice nucleation focused mainly on bacteria such as Pseudomonas syringae, but several fungi can also promote ice formation at relatively warm subzero temperatures. This is important for atmospheric science because supercooled cloud droplets can remain liquid below 0 °C unless an ice-nucleating particle lowers the energetic barrier for crystallization. Biological ice nucleators are often more efficient than mineral particles, and bacterial and fungal systems can promote freezing above −5 °C. One well-studied example is Fusarium acuminatum. Schwidetzky et al. showed that ice nucleators extracted from F. acuminatum spores and mycelial surfaces are cell-free, proteinaceous, and capable of binding to ice. Their study found that the active material contains small protein subunits of about 5.3 kDa that assemble into larger ice-nucleating complexes. Some of these complexes may contain more than 100 subunits, producing a large enough ordered surface to catalyze freezing at low supercooling. The same study also found that strong ice-nucleating activity could return even when only a smaller size-excluded protein fraction was initially present, suggesting that these proteins can reassemble into active aggregates in aqueous solution. This mechanism broadens the possible atmospheric role of fungi. If fungal ice nucleation can be carried by extracellular proteins or fragments rather than only intact living cells, then spores, hyphal fragments, dried biological residues, or nanoscale biological particles may also be relevant in clouds. Schwidetzky et al. noted that Fusarium is widely distributed in soil and on plants and has also been detected in atmospheric and cloud-water samples, making it a useful model for studying biological ice nucleation in the atmosphere. A separate class of fungal ice-nucleating proteins has been identified in fungi of the Mortierellaceae family. Eufemio et al. reported ice-nucleating proteins in Mortierella alpina, Entomortierella parvispora, and Podila clonocystis that are related to bacterial InaZ ice-nucleating proteins. These fungal proteins are predicted to form β-solenoid structures and to multimerize into larger ice-binding surfaces. Phylogenetic evidence suggests that the fungal genes were likely acquired from a bacterial ancestor through horizontal gene transfer, followed by evolutionary changes within fungi. Functional tests support this interpretation. Eufemio et al. expressed fungal InaZ-like genes in yeast and Escherichia coli and found that the host organisms gained ice-nucleating activity, confirming that the genes encode active ice-nucleating proteins. Modeling of native fungal freezing spectra suggested that warmer freezing modes arise when individual proteins assemble into larger multimers, such as trimers, tetramers, and pentamers. This supports the general principle that efficient biological ice nucleation depends on building a large, ordered ice-binding surface.

== See also ==
- Pseudomonas syringae
- Ice-minus bacteria
- Aeroplankton
