= Pseudomonas avellanae =

Scientific classification
- Domain: Bacteria
- Kingdom: Pseudomonadati
- Phylum: Pseudomonadota
- Class: Gammaproteobacteria
- Order: Pseudomonadales
- Family: Pseudomonadaceae
- Genus: Pseudomonas
- Species: P. avellanae

Binomial name
- Pseudomonas avellanae Janse et al. 1996

Type strain
- CIP 105176 DSM 11809; JCM 11937; NCPPB 3487

Synonyms
- Pseudomonas syringae pv. avellanae Dye et al. 1980; Pseudomonas syringae pv. theae Dye et al. 1980

Species of bacterium

Pseudomonas avellanae is a Gram-negative plant pathogenic bacterium. It is the causal agent of bacterial canker of hazelnut (Corylus avellana). Based on 16S rRNA analysis, P. avellanae has been placed in the P. syringae group. This species was once included as a pathovar of Pseudomonas syringae, but following DNA-DNA hybridization, it was instated as a separate species. Following ribotypical analysis Pseudomonas syringae pv. theae was incorporated into this species.
