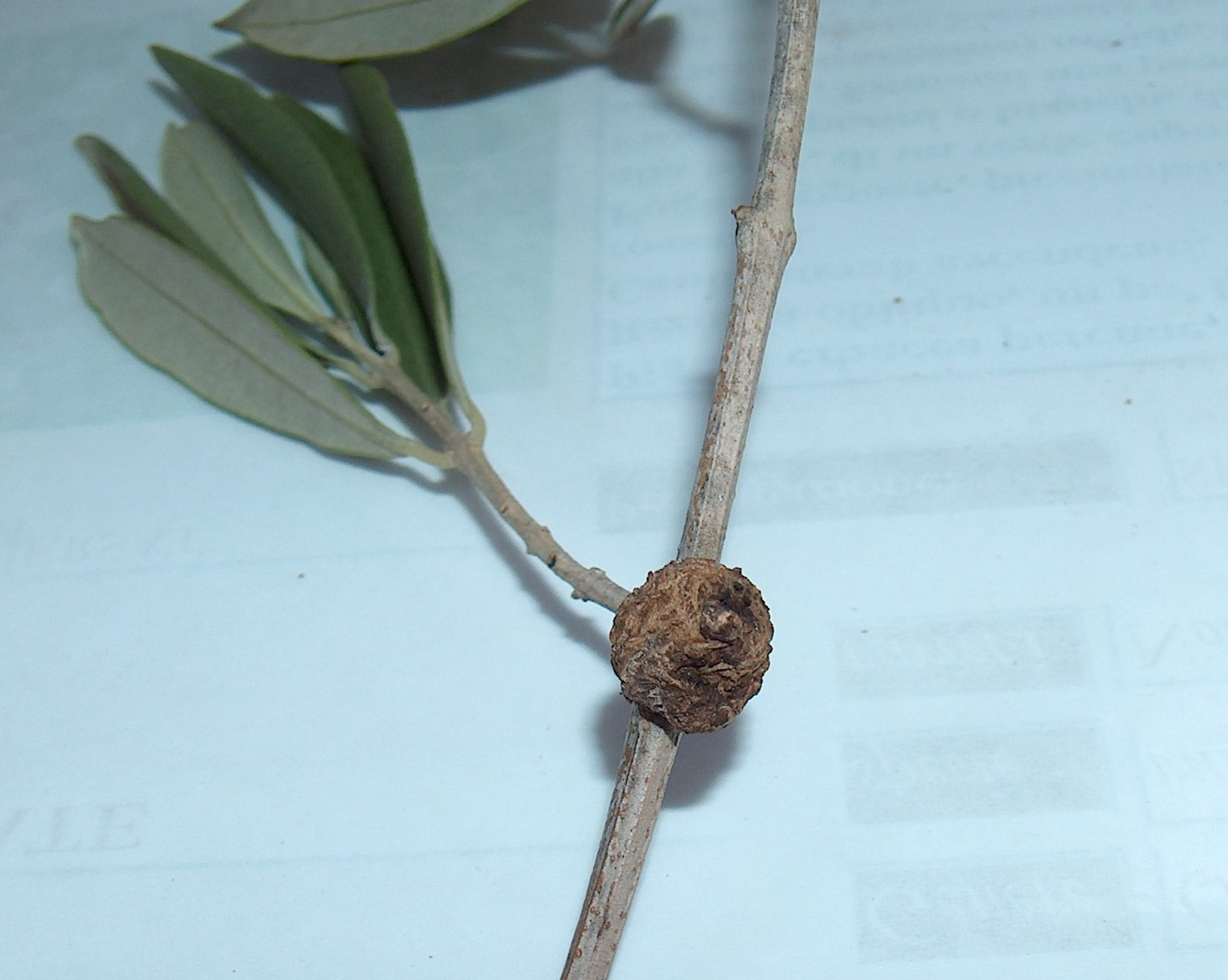
- Twig of olive-tree with a tumour caused by Pseudomonas savastanoi

Scientific classification
- Domain: Bacteria
- Kingdom: Pseudomonadati
- Phylum: Pseudomonadota
- Class: Gammaproteobacteria
- Order: Pseudomonadales
- Family: Pseudomonadaceae
- Genus: Pseudomonas
- Species: P. savastanoi

Binomial name
- Pseudomonas savastanoi (Janse 1982); Gardan, et al. 1992

Type strain
- ATCC 13522 CFBP 1670; CIP 103721; ICMP 4352; LMG 2209; NCPPB 639

Pathovars
- P. s. pv. fraxini P. s. pv. nerii P. s. pv. oleae Janse; P. s. pv. phaseolicola P. s. pv. savastanoi (Smith) Janse

Synonyms
- Pseudomonas syringae pv. savastanoi (Smith 1908) Young et al. 1978; Pseudomonas syringae subsp. savastanoi (ex Smith 1908) Janse 1982 Pseudomonas medicaginis Burkholder 1926; Pseudomonas tonelliana (Ferraris 1926) Burkholder 1948; Pseudomonas oleae (Arcangeli) Duggar 1909; Agrobacterium savastanoi (Smith) Starr and Weiss 1943; Agrobacterium tonellianum (Ferraris) Starr and Weiss 1943; Bacterium savastanoi E.F. Smith 1908; Bacterium tonellianum Ferraris 1926; Phytomonas savastanoi (Smith) Bergey et al. 1923; Phytomonas tonelliana (Ferraris) Adam and Pugsley 1934; Pseudomonas syringae subsp. savastanoi pv. oleae Janse 1981; Pseudomonas savastanoi Smith and Petri 1908

= Pseudomonas savastanoi =

Species of bacterium

Pseudomonas savastanoi is a gram-negative plant pathogenic bacterium that infects a variety of plants. It was once considered a pathovar of Pseudomonas syringae, but following DNA-relatedness studies, it was instated as a new species. It is named after Savastano, a worker who proved between 1887 and 1898 that olive knot are caused by bacteria.

The pathovar of greatest economical significance is Pseudomonas savastanoi pv. savastanoi, which causes the disease olive knot. Symptoms include formation of galls on infected trees; tumour formation is induced by indoleacetic acid biosynthesis by the bacteria, in a similar manner to the well-studied crown gall pathogen, Agrobacterium tumefaciens.

== History ==
One of the first scientists to carry out scientific and modern research on the disease of olive trees caused by Pseudomonas savastanoi (Italian: la rogna dell'ulivo) was Giuseppe Maria Giovene (1753–1837), who explained his conclusions in his publication Sulla rogna degli ulivi (1789).

== Pathovars ==
- Pseudomonas savastanoi pv. fraxini causes ash bacterial canker.
- Pseudomonas savastanoi pv. nerii attacks oleander.
- Pseudomonas savastanoi pv. savastanoi causes olive knot.
- Pseudomonas savastanoi pv. phaseolicola attacks Phaseolus (bean) plants

== Quorum sensing ==
P. s. pv. s. has an unusual quorum sensing dynamic: It shares quorum with an entirely different order, the Enterobacterales. Hosni et al., 2011 and Caballo-Ponce et al., 2018 find P. s. pv. s. produces very similar N-acyl homoserine lactones (AHLs) to the Erwiniaceae Erwinia toletana and Pantoea agglomerans. Hosni find an avirulent mutant – defective for AHL production – is restored to virulence by the presence of E. toletana and P. agglomerans. These results demonstrate disease enhancing cooperation but also reveal a possible way that undiscovered cheating may be occurring.
