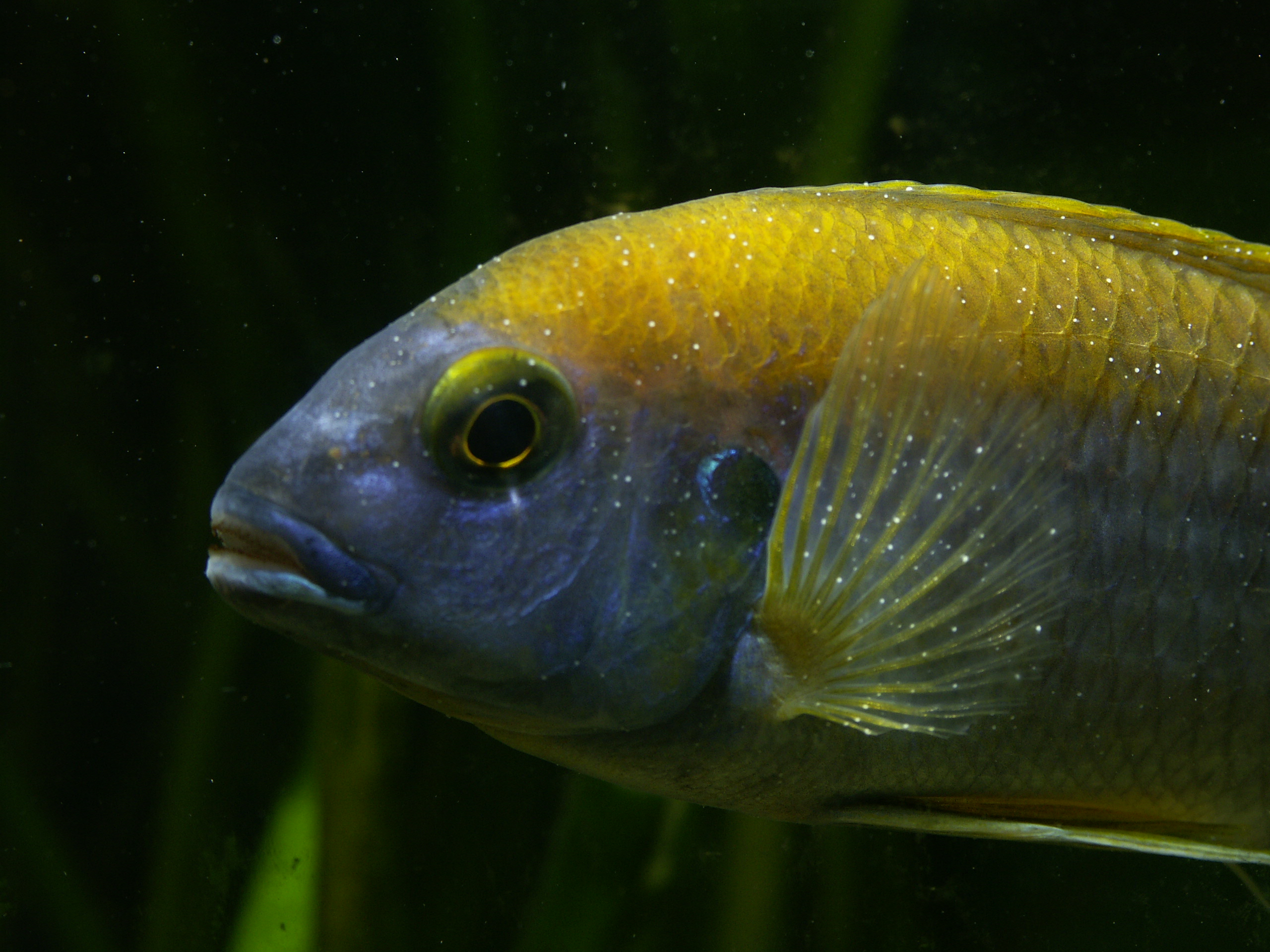
- Cichlid showing the white spots characteristic of Ich

Scientific classification
- Domain: Eukaryota
- Supergroup: Alveolata
- Phylum: Ciliophora
- Class: Oligohymenophorea
- Order: Hymenostomatida
- Family: Ichthyophthiriidae
- Genus: Ichthyophthirius
- Species: I. multifiliis

Binomial name
- Ichthyophthirius multifiliis Fouquet, 1876

= Ichthyophthirius multifiliis =

Parasitic species of protozoan

Ichthyophthirius multifiliis, often termed "ich", is a parasitic ciliate. Only one species is found in the genus, which also gave name to the family. The name literally translates as "the fish louse with many children". The parasite can infect most freshwater fish species and, in contrast to many other parasites, shows low host specificity. It penetrates gill epithelia, skin and fins of the fish host and resides as a feeding stage (the trophont) inside the epidermis. It is visible as a white spot on the surface of the fish but, due to its internal microhabitat, it is a true endoparasite and not an ectoparasite.

It causes a disease commonly referred to as white spot disease due to the macroscopically visible trophonts (up to 1 mm in diameter) in the skin and fins. The trophont, continuously rotating, is surrounded by host cells (epidermal cells and leukocytes), producing a minute elevation of the skin. These light-reflecting nodules are recognized as white spots.

If strict bio-security rules are violated, the parasite may be introduced into a fish rearing unit by transfer of fish or equipment from infected systems. When the organism gets into a large fish culture facility, it is difficult to control due to its fast-reproductive cycle. If not controlled, the infection may lead to 100% mortality in the tank.

Strict management measures including mechanical and chemical methods are generally applied and can keep the infection at an acceptable level at farms. However, these measures are costly in terms of labour, chemicals and lost fish.

Research within the Horizon2020 project ParaFishControl pointed to a range of new approaches for control. For example, the fish immune system has an ability to combat invading parasites and a vaccine may be developed in the future. In addition, novel bacterial products (surfactants from Pseudomonas) can directly kill the external stages of the parasite without harming the host.

Ichthyophthirius multifiliis inflicts considerable damage to gills and skin in two ways. Firstly, the theronts penetrate the host epithelia and, when the number of parasites is high in relation to the fish size, the penetration may directly kill the fish by destroying the integrity of the fish surface. Secondly, if the invasion is successful, the invading theronts transform into the trophont stage in the fish epidermis where they develop and expand their volume manifold. When the trophonts burst out from their epidermal residence, severe ulceration follows, leading to high host mortality. The osmoregulation of the fish is challenged both by penetration and by trophont escape. Damage to the host's gills also reduces the respiratory efficiency of the fish, reducing its oxygen intake from the water.

== Life cycle ==
Simplified scheme of the life cycle of the fish parasite Ichthyophthirius multifiliis

The life cycle of the parasite is direct, which means that no intermediate hosts are included in transmission. It includes a trophont stage residing in the fish surface (gill epithelia, skin and fin epidermis). This stage is the feeding stage which continuously ingests cellular debris and live host cells in its epidermal location, making the parasite able to grow rapidly over a short time – depending on temperature.

When the trophont has reached a certain size (100–1000 μm), it breaks out of the host epidermis and swim freely as a tomont (also covered by cilia). After minutes to hours, the tomont attaches to any surface in the fishpond or fish tank and produces a thick, gelatinous cyst wall. This is termed the tomocyst stage.

Within the tomocyst, a series of mitotic cell divisions take place and, depending on temperature, up to 1000 resulting daughter cells (tomites) are produced. These escape the tomocyst by penetrating the cyst wall, whereafter they swim in the fish tank water searching for a fish host, which they penetrate fast and efficiently if it is naïve and non-immunized.

This life cycle is highly dependent on water temperature, and the entire life cycle takes from approximately 7 days at 25 °C to 8 weeks at 5–6 °C.

== Pathology and clinical signs ==
=== Signs and symptoms ===
The infection challenges hosts' osmoregulation and respiration. Secondary bacterial and fungal infections are common due to the disturbance of epithelial linings. When trophonts burst out of the epidermis, non-protected (non-mucous cell lined) cells become accessible to other pathogens.

=== Clinical signs ===
Typical behaviour of clinically infected fish includes:

- Anorexia (loss of appetite)
- Increased breathing rate (hyperventilation)
- Discoloration
- Abnormal behaviour (inactivity, isolation)
- Resting on the bottom
- Flashing (rubbing and scratching against objects)
- Balance disturbance. Upside-down swimming near the surface.

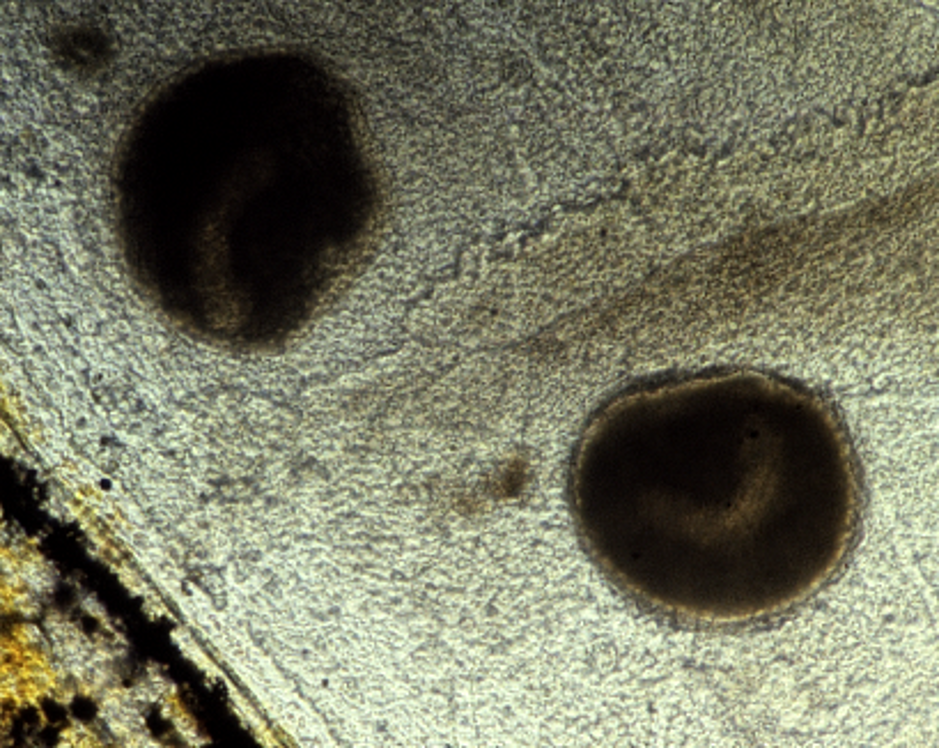
Trophonts of Ichthyophthirius multifiliis (diameter 300 μm) in the epidermis of a rainbow trout tail fin (light microscopy with subillumination). The horseshoe-shaped macronucleus is visible (photo: Kurt Buchman, University of Copenhagen).

Theront penetration may elicit erratic swimming and movements reflecting irritation of fish surfaces. The trophont is not visible to the naked eye until it has fed on the fish and grown to a diameter of about 0.3–0.5 millimetres. The white spots may reach more than 1 mm in diameter and are easily recognized on skin and fins whereas trophonts attached to the gills are hard to see due to the gill cover (operculum).

Skin: Ich infections are usually visible as one or several characteristic white spots on the body or fins of the fish. The white spots are single cells called trophonts, which feed on host cells (epidermal cells and leukocytes attracted to the site) and may grow to 1 mm in diameter. Heavy infections with subsequent lesions following trophont escape leave the skin irregular, fluffy and greyish.

Gills: Gill infection may cause breathing at the surface and increased ventilation movements of operculae.

=== Impact ===
Due to the low host specificity of the parasite, Ich infection is known from all freshwater fish systems examined. However, the susceptibility and the impact differ between host species. Rainbow trout, catfish and eels are highly susceptible fish species and uncontrolled infections lead to almost 100% mortality. Some cyprinids, such as zebrafish, have a higher innate protection and may clear the infection faster than other species.

Sturgeon are also highly susceptible to infection by Ich.

== Diagnosis ==
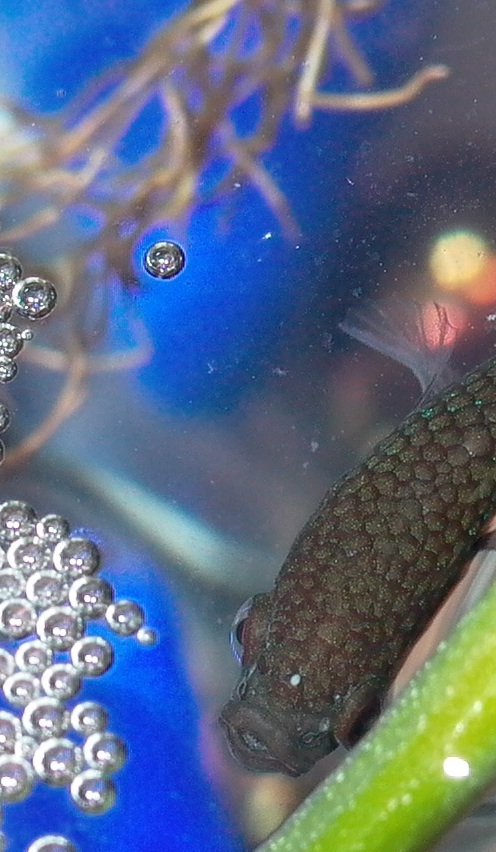
Siamese fighting fish with a spot of Ich between the eyes

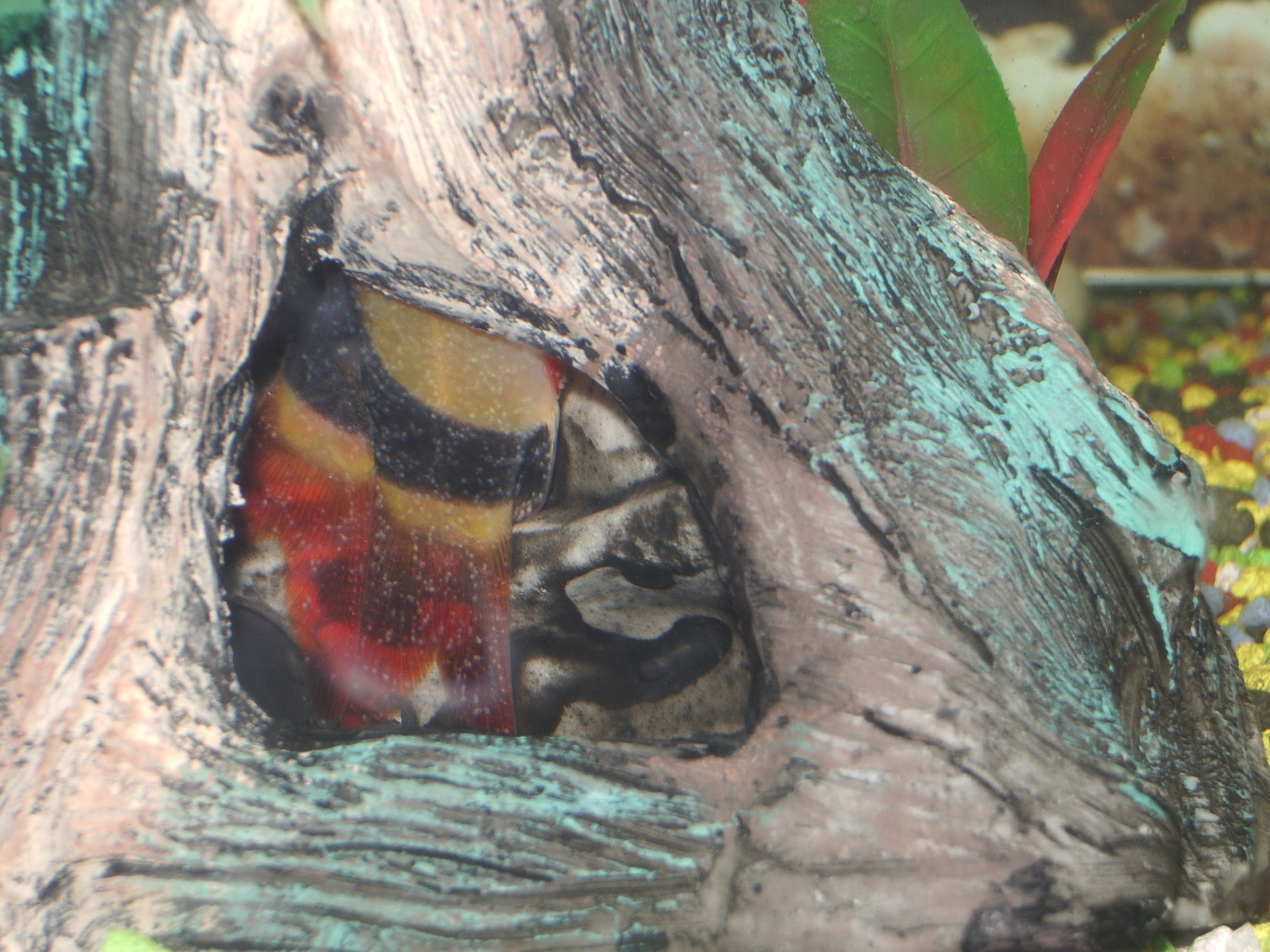
Two juvenile clown loaches with Ich

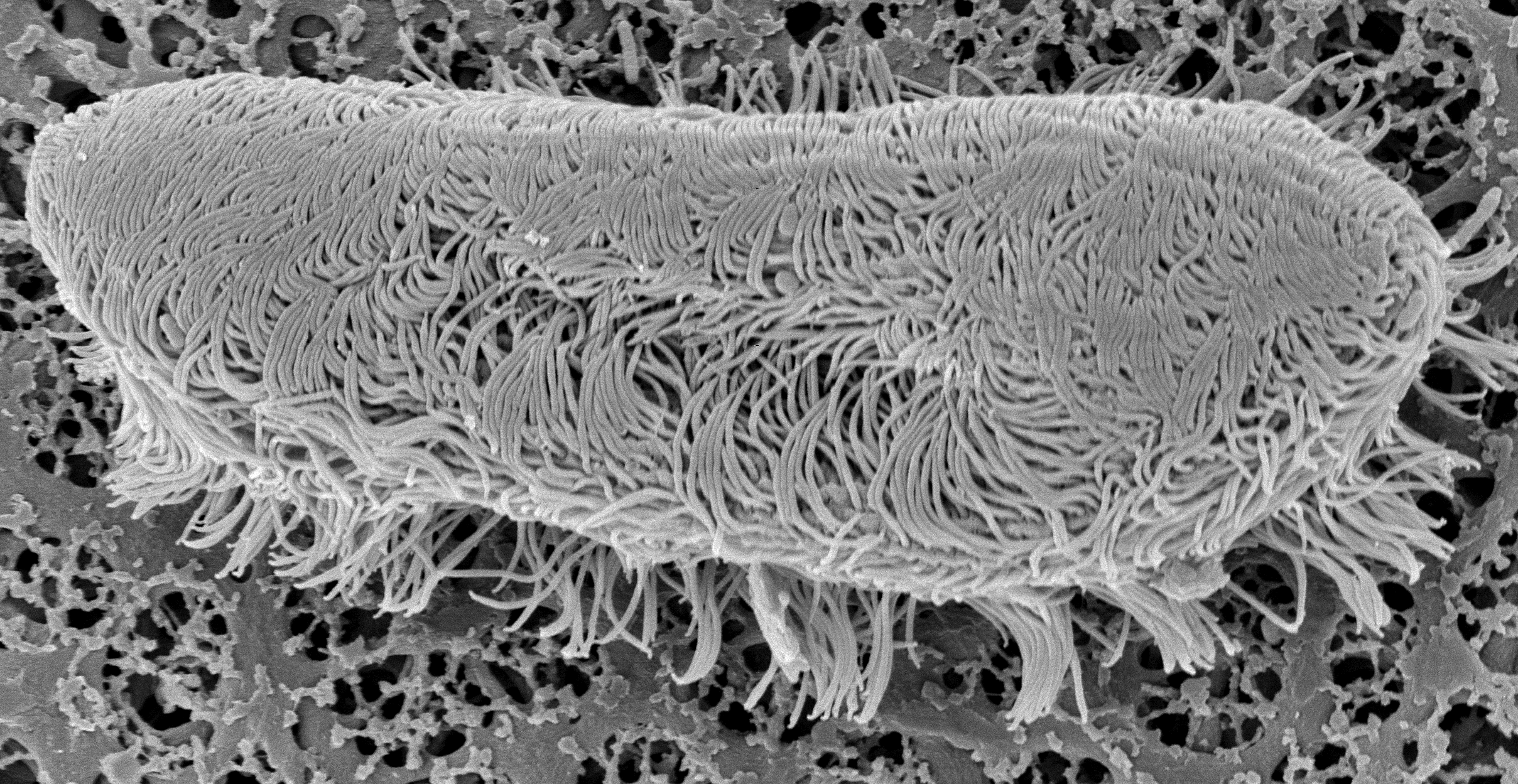
Scanning electron microscope image of Ichthyophthirius multifiliis theront (photo: Ole S. Møller, University of Copenhagen)

Macroscopically visible trophonts (white spots) on skin or fins is often the basis for a tentative diagnosis of I. multifiliis infection. The diagnosis can be confirmed by microscopic examination of skin and gill smears. Scrapings of skin, fins or gill surfaces (using a cover slip or scalpel) and subsequent mounting on a microscope slide with a few drops of water under a cover slip should be examined under the light microscope (20–400 x magnification). The trophont is slowly rotating, covered by rapidly beating cilia and has a prominent, horseshoe-shaped macro-nucleus. Molecular diagnosis can be based on knowledge of genes encoding the parasite's i-antigen and is performed by PCR and quantitative real-time PCR.

== Treatments ==
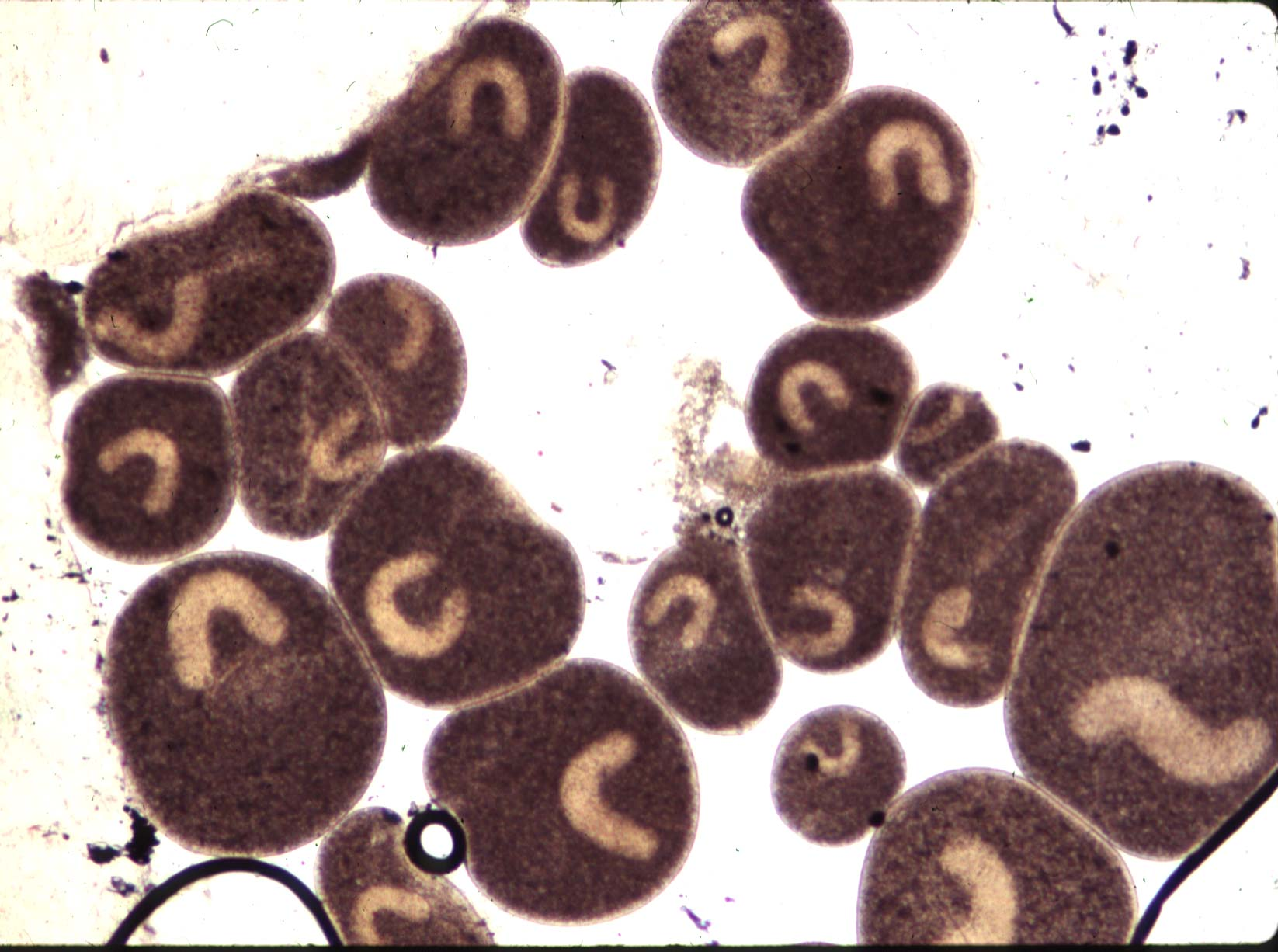
Ichthyophthirius multifiliis

=== Chemicals and medicines ===
Various chemotherapeutants can be applied for the treatment of infected fish and infected fish farm systems but caution should always be observed during any treatment. Some drugs are toxic to certain fish species and any treatment method must take into account the species of fish (some do not tolerate certain medications). Malachite green was previously the drug of choice but, due to its carcinogenicity, this organic dye is now banned in some countries. Formalin when applied repeatedly (30–50 mg/L) kills infective theronts and tomonts but, due to its carcinogenicity, other chemotherapeutants should be used. Copper-sulphate, methylene blue and potassium permanganate are effective but questionable from an environmental point of view. Copper may still be applied in some countries, but it is easy to overdose with copper. The recommended dosage is 0.15–0.3 mg/L and the concentration should never exceed 0.4 mg/L. Copper is noticeably more toxic to fish in soft water than in hard water. Drugs such as metronidazole and quinine hydrochloride are effective as well, but require prescription from a veterinary authority.

Environmentally friendly products include hydrogen peroxide and hydrogen peroxide releasing products such as sodium percarbonate and peracetic acid. These compounds can be added to the fish tank water and eliminate theronts and tomonts but do not affect the trophont stage in the fish skin. The toxicity of hydrogen peroxide is increased at higher temperatures. Sodium chloride when applied in a concentration of at least 7.5 g/L inhibits production of infective theronts in tomocysts. When used in a concentration of 10 g/L over 14 days, the parasite can be eliminated from a recirculated fish farm system.

Recently, a wide series of herbal extracts have been shown as effective, including garlic juice, which has a toxic effect on theronts and trophonts. Biological control has also demonstrated its potential. A lipopeptide secreted as a surfactant from the bacterium Pseudomonas H6 has been shown to kill theronts, tomonts and tomocysts. It is not toxic to fish, which suggests that future control can be based on environmentally friendly, natural products.

=== Management ===
Total fish removal and repeated transfer to clean tanks may be applied. Theronts, the motile and fish-infecting stage of the Ich life cycle, exit from the tomocyst at the bottom of the tank. However, without fish to re-attach to, theronts die within 48 hours (at higher temperatures). An effective way to clear Ich from a fish population is to transfer all of the fish carrying trophonts in their skin, fins or gills to a non-infected tank every 24 hours. Then the fish do not get re-infected and after a number of days (dependent on temperature) the fish have cleared the infection because trophonts exit within this period. They do not have sufficient time to produce theronts as 24 h is too short time for released tomonts to develop via tomocysts releasing the infective stage. Under colder water conditions, these management procedures should be continued over a longer time. Another method is to use mechanical filtration of water using mesh sizes of 80 microns. This removes the tomonts from the water before they settle and transform to the tomocyst stage (the multiplication step).

== Other control strategies ==
=== Prevention ===
Priority should be given to avoid introducing the parasite in the first place. New warm-water fish should be quarantined for at least four weeks and cold-water fish for eight weeks. Recognition of biosecurity measures for fish farm personnel including using a biocide foot bath, separate dress for the unit, using separate equipment and disinfecting hands before and after maintenance of each tank, reduces the risk of spreading the parasite between units.

The host response may provide some protection. Fish recovering from an infection are partly protected against reinfection and can resist a new infection. Prevention of the disease by vaccination is, at present, not possible due to the lack of a commercially available vaccine. However, several studies have identified potential vaccine candidate proteins, e.g. i-antigens and others, of the parasite, which suggests that a vaccine can be produced in the future.

== Research ==
Due to the occurrence and impact of I. multifiliis in freshwater fish farm systems worldwide, considerable research efforts are being conducted in laboratories worldwide. New drugs and herbal extracts are being tested for their impact on various stages of the parasite.

In the European H2020 supported research project ParaFishControl, a series of control methods have been explored. The parasite can be propagated in the laboratory – most successfully in the hosts (in vivo), but also cell cultures can support part of the life cycle (in vitro). Experimental vaccines are being tested for future control purposes. Surfactants (with a high parasiticidal effect) from naturally occurring bacteria, such as Pseudomonas, are being explored and prepared for marketing. Herbal extracts have been demonstrated to stimulate immune responses of fish (and thereby partly inhibit development of the trophont), such as rainbow trout. Management procedures, based on a basic understanding of the life cycle, can reduce the infection pressure considerably. All together, these approaches can be applied for integrated control of I. multifiliis infections in aquacultured fish. Due to the development of aquaculture systems – affecting the life cycle and pathogenicity of the parasites – continued research is needed in order to secure control of this parasitosis also in the future.

== See also ==
- Marine ich, a similar disease of marine fishes
