= Pseudomonas helianthi =

Scientific classification
- Domain: Bacteria
- Kingdom: Pseudomonadati
- Phylum: Pseudomonadota
- Class: Gammaproteobacteria
- Order: Pseudomonadales
- Family: Pseudomonadaceae
- Genus: Pseudomonas
- Species: P. helianthi

Binomial name
- Pseudomonas helianthi Elasri et al. 2001

Type strain
- CFPB 1694

Pathovars
- "P. h." pv. helianthi; "P. h." pv. tagetis

Species of bacterium

"Pseudomonas helianthi" is a Gram-negative plant pathogenic bacterium that infects a variety of plants. It was once considered a pathovar of Pseudomonas syringae, but following DNA-relatedness studies, it was recognized as a separate species and P. syringae pv. tagetis was incorporated into it, as well. Since no official name has yet been given, it is referred to by the epithet 'Pseudomonas helianthi' .

== Pathovars ==
- "Pseudomonas helianthi" pv. helianthi attacks sunflowers (Helianthus annuus).
- "Pseudomonas helianthi" pv. tagetis attacks marigolds (Tagetes erecta).
