= Peavy =

Peavy may refer to:

People named:

- Jake Peavy (born 1981), American baseball player
- Micah Peavy (born 2001), American basketball player
- Nathan Peavy (born 1985), American basketball player
- Paulina Peavy (1901–1999), American artist

In forestry:

- Peavy Arboretum, an arboretum in Oregon, United States

Places

- Peavy, Texas

== See also ==
- Peavey (disambiguation)
