= Bacterial ice-nucleation proteins =

Bacterial ice-nucleation proteins octamer repeat

Identifiers
- Symbol: Ice_nucleatn
- Pfam: PF00818
- InterPro: IPR000258
- PROSITE: PDOC00283
Available protein structures:
- PDB: IPR000258 PF00818 (ECOD; PDBsum)
- AlphaFold: IPR000258; PF00818

Bacterial ice-nucleation proteins are a family of proteins that enable Gram-negative bacteria to promote nucleation of ice at relatively high temperatures (above −5 °C). These proteins are localised at the outer membrane surface and can cause frost damage to many plants. The primary structure of the proteins contains a highly repetitive domain that dominates the sequence. The domain comprises a number of 48-residue repeats, which themselves contain 3 blocks of 16 residues, the first 8 of which are identical. It is thought that the repetitive domain may be responsible for aligning water molecules in the seed crystal.

             [.........48.residues.repeated.domain..........]
            /              / |              | \              \
           AGYGSTxTagxxssli  AGYGSTxTagxxsxlt  AGYGSTxTaqxxsxlt
           [16.residues...]  [16.residues...]  [16.residues...]

== See also ==
- Ice-minus bacteria
