= Pee Vee =

Pee Vee may refer to:

- Pee Vee, Harlan County, Kentucky
- Abdul Wahab Peevee, an entrepreneur and a politician from Indian Union Muslim League

== See also ==
- PV (disambiguation)
- Pee Wee (disambiguation)
- Peavey (disambiguation)
