= INF1 =

Disease chemicals recognized by plants

INF1s are elicitins, proteins which are produced by plant pathogens and recognized by hosts. They are produced by Phytophthora, Pythium, and Pseudomonas spp.

Known INF1s include:

- PsINF1, the INF1 in Pseudomonas syringae
- PiINF1, an INF1 in Phytophthora infestans
- PiMAMPINF1 , a MAMP INF1 in P. infestans. PiMAPINF1 is known to trigger two MAPKs in Nicotiana benthamiana, Salicylic acid-Induced Protein Kinase (SIPK) and Wound-Induced Protein Kinase .
- PcINF1, the INF1 in Phytophthora capsici
