= Coronatine =

Names
- Preferred IUPAC name (1S,2S)-2-Ethyl-1-[(3aS,6R,7aS)-6-ethyl-1-oxo-2,3,3a,6,7,7a-hexahydro-1H-indene-4-carboxamido]cyclopropane-1-carboxylic acid

Identifiers
CAS Number	62251-96-1
3D model (JSmol)	Interactive image
ChemSpider	82784
PubChem CID	91681
UNII	WCR4XUE8VB
CompTox Dashboard (EPA)	DTXSID20977826
- InChI: InChI=1S/C18H25NO4/c1-3-10-7-13-12(5-6-15(13)20)14(8-10)16(21)19-18(17(22)23)9-11(18)4-2/h8,10-13H,3-7,9H2,1-2H3,(H,19,21)(H,22,23)/t10-,11+,12+,13+,18+/m1/s1 Key: FMGBNISRFNDECK-CZSBRECXSA-N; InChI=1/C18H25NO4/c1-3-10-7-13-12(5-6-15(13)20)14(8-10)16(21)19-18(17(22)23)9-11(18)4-2/h8,10-13H,3-7,9H2,1-2H3,(H,19,21)(H,22,23)/t10-,11+,12+,13+,18+/m1/s1 Key: FMGBNISRFNDECK-CZSBRECXBX
- SMILES: O=C(O)[C@@]3(NC(=O)/C1=C/[C@@H](C[C@@H]2C(=O)CC[C@H]12)CC)[C@@H](CC)C3

Properties
Chemical formula	C_{18}H_{25}NO_{4}
Molar mass	319.401 g·mol^{−1}
- Except where otherwise noted, data are given for materials in their standard state (at 25 °C [77 °F], 100 kPa). Infobox references

Coronatine (COR) is a toxin produced by the bacterium Pseudomonas syringae. It is involved in causing stomata to re-open after they close in response to pathogen-associated molecular patterns, as well as interfering with the responses mediated by salicylic acid after the infection has begun. It consists of coronafacic acid (CFA), which is an analog of methyl jasmonic acid (MeJA), and coronamic acid (CMA), joined by an amide bond between the acid group of CFA and the amino group of CMA.
