= Bacterial blight of soybean =

Bacterial plant disease

Bacterial blight of soybean is a widespread disease of soybeans caused by Pseudomonas syringae pv. glycinea.

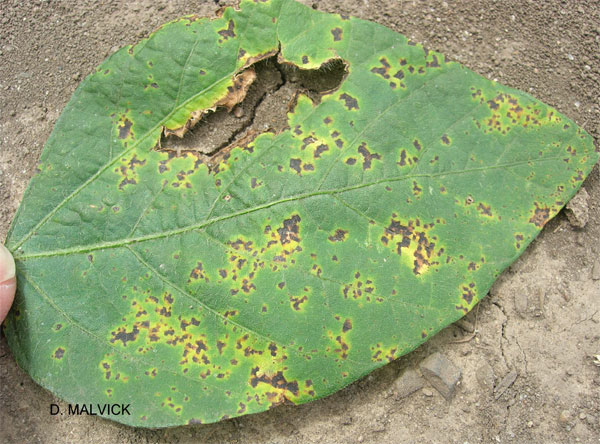
Image of a soybean leaf infected with bacterial blight.

== Importance ==
Soybeans are grown all over the world and are a primary source of vegetable oil and protein. Approximately 40% of the world's supply of vegetable oil comes from soybeans. Therefore, it is important to guarantee a successful soybean crop every growing season. Bacterial blight can be found in most soybean fields every year in the Midwest. Yield losses due to Pseudomonas syringae pv. glycinea have been reported as anywhere from 4% to 40% depending on the severity of the conditions. The disease does not normally affect yield levels as it occurs early in the growth of soybeans and the crop is able to compensate the loss of photosynthetic area. It is still adventitious to monitor for bacterial blight as substantial loss may occur when susceptible cultivars are grown under unfavorable conditions. Pseudomonas syringae pv glycinea should be monitored carefully in seed production fields as it is seed borne and can affect seed quality. A study conducted by Stefani et al. in 1998 found that seeds with contamination levels ranging from 0.5 to 20% did not lead to any significant yield loss when grown in warm and dry regions. Usage of resistant cultivars in the proper environment is therefore an effective way of eliminating the impact of this pathogen. It is not uncommon for countries to have quarantines in place for this pathogen as the inoculum is often spread in soybean seeds.

== Hosts and symptoms ==
Bacterial blight of soybean is caused by the bacterial agent Pseudomonas syringae pv. glycinea. This bacterium also causes disease in snap bean (Phaseolus vulgaris) and lima bean (Phaseolus lunatus), however it is more commonly seen in soybean. Pseudomonas syringae pv. glycinea attacks all of the above-ground parts of soybean, but symptoms are typically seen on the mid-upper canopy of leaves and pods. After infection, small, water-soaked spots surrounded by a chlorotic halo appear on the leaves. The brown or black centers of these spots indicate that the tissue is dying. Typically these spots will enlarge and merge to form large, dead patches on the leaves. The leaves appear ragged if the dead tissue falls out. Lesions on pods are initially small and water-soaked but eventually enlarge, turn brown to black, and merge to encompass the whole pod. Infection can also occur on the stems, petioles and seeds.

== Disease cycle ==
Pseudomonas syringae pv. glycinea overwinters in crop residue and in seeds. Infection usually begins when the infected plant material is carried by a rainstorm with high winds to healthy soybean plants. Bacteria can enter through natural openings (stomata) or through wounds. In order to enter through natural openings, however, water must be present on the leaf surface. Bacterial Blight may appear after infected seedlings are planted and begin to emerge. In addition to being spread via wind and rain, transmission may occur when leaves of infected soybean rub against leaves of healthy soybean. Symptoms begin to appear 5–7 days after infection.

== Pathogenesis ==
Bacterial blight of soybeans can enter leaves through wounds or natural openings such as stomata. After gaining entrance to the host leaves, Pseudomonas syringae pv. glycinea multiplies in the leaf intercellular fluid. The pathogen must then overcome the plants defenses. Pseudomonas syringae pv. glycinea accomplishes this by using the type three secretion system to inject a variety of pathogenicity effector proteins (Hrp proteins) into the plant cell cytoplasm. These proteins act by interfering with effector-triggered immunity and producing phytohormones/toxins that suppress plant defenses. The expression of these virulence factors depends on the environmental conditions at the time of infection (see "environment section). Furthermore, expression of virulence factors will only take place when a sufficiently large population of bacteria is present, which is determined through quorum sensing. When successful, the common symptoms of bacterial blight will be seen, with the main effect on the plant being a reduction in photosynthetic leaf area. Generally, the amount of photosynthetic area lost is not enough to impede plant growth. As the plant continues to grow it overcomes the loss of photosynthetic area and reduction in yield, if there is any, is negligible.

A variety of phytotoxins that contribute to the severity of disease have been identified in Pseudomonas syringae. Coronatine has been identified in Pseudomonas syringae pv. glycinea, which is responsible for the development of chlorosis. Necrosis inducing phytotoxins include syringomycins and syringopeptins.

A complex relationship between hypersensitive response and pathogenicity genes, avirulence genes, and plant resistance genes gives rise to the virulence of bacterial pathogens. Generally, a single avirulence gene (in the bacterium) corresponds to a single resistance gene (in the plant host), giving rise to the concept of a gene-for-gene response. The avirulence gene leads to the pathogen being avirulent, or unable to induce disease on a specific variety of plant hosts, those being the ones carrying the corresponding resistance genes. Soybean cultivars that have been bread to contain resistance genes Rpg1, Rpg2, Rpg3, and Rpg4 have been shown to be resistant to Pseudomonas syringae pv. glycinea race 4. The corresponding avirulence genes in the bacterium are avrB, avrA, avrC, and avrD. A different race of Pseudomonas syringae pv. glycinea may still be able to elicit disease in these soybean cultivars as it may carry different avirulence genes. Researchers have shown that the exchange of avirulence genes can switch a race from being virulent to avirulent and vice versa. Thus, evolution, mutation, and cases of horizontal gene transfer can make it difficult to breed longterm resistance into soybean cultivars.

== Environment ==
Members of the family Pseudomonadaceae are highly resilient organisms. They have been found in virtually every habitat in which they have been sought: from the deepest parts of the oceans to the soils of the highest mountains. It thus comes as no surprise that Pseudomonas syringae pv. glycinea is able to adapt to a wide range of environmental conditions.

However, research suggests that moist conditions and temperatures between 23 and 28 °C provide optimal growing conditions for the pathogen.

Additionally, monocultures contribute to making the disease endemic by providing organic materials (crop residue) in which the pathogen may overwinter.

== Management ==
Since bacterial blight of soybean can be transmitted via infected seeds, one of the most efficient control method is to use clean seeds. Clean seeds are commercially available at any of the major seed retailers in the world (e.g. Monsanto). The advantage of getting seeds from industrial vendors is that the latter guarantee the lack of pathogenic activity in the seeds.

Crop rotation has also been shown to be effective in limiting both the spread and the severity of bacterial blight outbreaks in soybean fields. Rotating crops limits the amount of both living and dead tissue that the pathogen can invade, and thereby limits the overall incidence of the disease in a given land area. Therefore, soybeans should be rotated with non-susceptible crops.

Avoiding susceptible soybean cultivars is yet another method commonly used amongst American farmers to avoid disease outbreaks.

Successful chemical control can also be achieved by spraying a mixture of streptocycline and copper oxychloride on young plants, although this is an uncommon practice due to the higher cost of treatment. However, in the recent years, scientists have discovered that leaf extracts from neem, ginger, garlic and onion also have the ability to significantly reduce the impact of bacterial blight in soybean.
