= Preferential voting (disambiguation) =

Preferential voting or PV in context of voting may refer to:

- Preferential voting
- Preferential block voting
- Optional preferential voting
- Positional voting
- Plurality voting
- Plurality (voting)
- Plurality block voting, or Plurality-at-large voting
- Party block voting, or General ticket
- Proportional approval voting
- Sequential proportional approval voting
- Proportional ranked-choice voting, or Single transferable vote
- Anti-plurality voting
- Parallel voting
- Party-line vote
