= Pee Wee (nickname) =

Pee Wee or Peewee is a nickname for:

== People ==
- Randy "Pee Wee" Anderson (1959–2002), American wrestling referee
- John Howell Collier (1899–1980), United States Army lieutenant general
- Pee Wee Crayton (1914–1985), American R&B and blues guitarist and singer
- Thomas "Pee Wee" DePhillips, a capo in the Genovese crime family
- Alfred "Pee Wee" Ellis (1941–2021), American saxophonist, composer and arranger
- Pee Wee Erwin (1913–1981), American jazz trumpeter
- Peewee Ferris, Australian DJ
- "Pee Wee", Jack Forsythe (c. 1882–1957), American college football player and coach
- Pee Wee, Donald Henry Gaskins (1933–1991), American serial killer
- Pee-Wee, Dave Herman (born 1984), American martial arts fighter
- Pee Wee Hunt (1907–1979), American jazz trombonist, vocalist and band leader
- Peewee Jarrett (born 1999), American football player
- Pee Wee, nickname of Shannon Johnson (born 1974), former Women's National Basketball Association player
- Pee Wee Kirkland (born 1945), former street basketball player
- Pee Wee Lambert (1924–1965), American mandolinist
- Pee Wee Marquette (1914–1992), American master of ceremonies at the Birdland jazz club
- Pee Wee Moore (1928–2009), American jazz saxophonist
- Pee Wee Reese (1918–1999), Hall of Fame baseball player
- Pee Wee Russell (1906–1969), American jazz musician
- Pee Wee Smith (born 1968), Canadian football player
- Pee-Wee Wanninger (1902–1981), Major League Baseball player
- Pee Wee Wentz (born 1941), retired NASCAR Winston Cup Series driver

== Fictional characters ==
- Pee-Wee Harris, in several series of boy's books by Percy Keese Fitzhugh and a comic strip
- Pee-wee Herman, created and portrayed by Paul Reubens
- Edward "Pee Wee" Morris, in the film Porky's and its two sequels
- Pee Wee, a main character in the novel Have Space Suit—Will Travel by Robert Heinlein

== See also ==
- Peewit (pronounced "Pee-Wee"), a character in the comic series Johan and Peewit and the animated TV series The Smurfs
