= Partido Verde =

Partido Verde is a Spanish or Portuguese language term meaning "green party" and may refer to one of the following political parties:

- Green Party (Brazil)
- Ecologist Green Party of Mexico (Partido Verde Ecologista de México)
- Oxygen Green Party (Partido Verde Oxígeno) of Colombia
- Ecologist Green Party of Nicaragua (Partido Verde Ecologista de Nicaragua)
- One of many other Green parties
