= Pee Wee Point =

Cape in West Virginia, United States

Coordinates: 39.4100988°N 78.2025039°W

Pee Wee Point is a cape in Berkeley County, West Virginia, in the United States.

The Tuscarora Trail passes over Pee Wee Point.
