= Peavey (surname) =

Peavey is a surname. Notable people with the surname include:

- Hartley Peavey (born 1941), American businessman, founder of Peavey Electronics
- Henry Peavey (1882–1931), American murder suspect
- Hubert H. Peavey (1881–1937), American politician
- Jack Peavey (born 1963), American football player and coach
- John Peavey (born 1933), American politician
