= Ice-minus bacteria =

Variation of the bacteria Pseudomonas syringae

Ice-minus bacteria is a common name given to a variant of the common bacterium Pseudomonas syringae (P. syringae). This strain of P. syringae lacks the ability to produce a certain surface protein, usually found on wild-type P. syringae. The "ice-plus" protein (INA protein, "Ice nucleation-active" protein) found on the outer bacterial cell wall acts as the nucleating centers for ice crystals. This facilitates ice formation, hence the designation "ice-plus". The ice-minus variant of P. syringae is a mutant, lacking the gene responsible for ice-nucleating surface protein production. This lack of surface protein provides a less favorable environment for ice formation. Both strains of P. syringae occur naturally, but recombinant DNA technology has allowed for the synthetic removal or alteration of specific genes, enabling the ice-minus strain to be created from the ice-plus strain in the lab.

The ice nucleating nature of P. syringae incites frost development, freezing the buds of the plant and destroying the occurring crop. The introduction of an ice-minus strain of P. syringae to the surface of plants would reduce the amount of ice nucleate present, rendering higher crop yields. The recombinant form was developed as a commercial product known as Frostban. Field-testing of Frostban in 1987 was the first release of a genetically modified organism into the environment. The testing was very controversial and drove the formation of US biotechnology policy. Frostban was never marketed.

== Production ==
To systematically create the ice-minus strain of P. syringae, its ice-forming gene must be isolated, amplified, deactivated and reintroduced into P. syringae bacterium. The following steps are often used to isolate and generate ice-minus strains of P. syringae:

1. Digest P. syringae's DNA with restriction enzymes.
2. Insert the individual DNA pieces into a plasmid. Pieces will insert randomly, allowing for different variations of recombinant DNA to be produced.
3. Transform the bacterium Escherichia coli (E.coli) with the recombinant plasmid. The plasmid will be taken in by the bacteria, rendering it part of the organism's DNA.
4. Identify the ice-gene from the numerous newly developed E. coli recombinants. Recombinant E. coli with the ice-gene will possess the ice-nucleating phenotype, these will be "ice-plus".
5. With the ice nucleating recombinant identified, amplify the ice gene with techniques such as polymerase chain reactions (PCR).
6. Create mutant clones of the ice gene through the introduction of mutagenic agents such as UV radiation to inactivate the ice gene, creating the "ice-minus" gene.
7. Repeat previous steps (insert gene into plasmid, transform E. coli, identify recombinants) with the newly created mutant clones to identify the bacteria with the ice-minus gene. They will possess the desired ice-minus phenotype.
8. Insert the ice-minus gene into normal, ice-plus P. syringae bacterium.
9. Allow recombination to take place, rendering both ice-minus and ice-plus strains of P. syringae.

== Economic importance ==
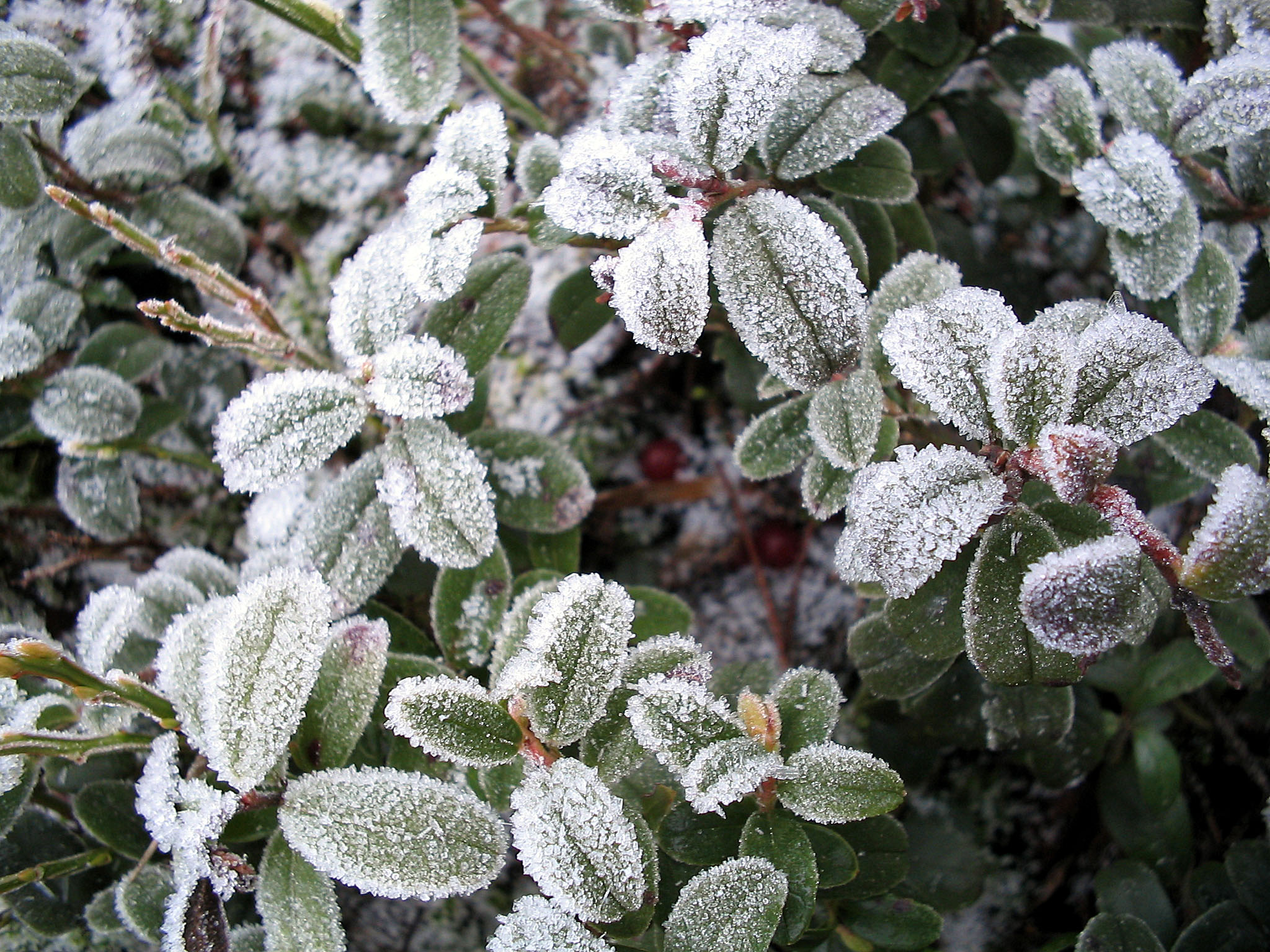
Icy lingonberry

In the United States alone, it has been estimated that frost accounts for approximately $1 billion in crop damage each year. As P. syringae commonly inhabits plant surfaces, its ice nucleating nature incites frost development, freezing the buds of the plant and destroying the occurring crop. The introduction of an ice-minus strain of P. syringae to the surface of plants would incur competition between the strains. Should the ice-minus strain win out, the ice nucleate provided by P. syringae would no longer be present, lowering the level of frost development on plant surfaces at normal water freezing temperature – 0 °C (32 °F). Even if the ice-minus strain does not win out, the amount of ice nucleate present from ice-plus P. syringae would be reduced due to competition. Decreased levels of frost generation at normal water freezing temperature would translate into a lowered quantity of crops lost due to frost damage, rendering higher crop yields overall.

== Historical perspective ==
In 1961, Paul Hoppe of the U.S. Department of Agriculture studied a corn fungus by grinding up infected leaves each season, then applying the powder to test corn for the following season to track the disease. A surprise frost occurred that year, leaving peculiar results. Only plants infected with the diseased powder incurred frost damage, leaving healthy plants unfrozen. This phenomenon would baffle scientists until graduate student Stephen Lindow of the University of Wisconsin–Madison with D.C. Arny and C. Upper found a bacterium in the dried leaf powder in the early 1970s. Lindow, now a plant pathologist at the University of California-Berkeley, found that when this particular bacterium was introduced to plants where it is originally absent, the plants became very vulnerable to frost damage. He would go on to identify the bacterium as P. syringae, investigate P. syringae's role in ice nucleation and in 1977, discover the mutant ice-minus strain. He was later successful at developing the ice-minus strain of P. syringae through recombinant DNA technology as well.

In 1983, Advanced Genetic Sciences (AGS), a biotech company, applied for U.S. government authorization to perform field tests with the ice-minus strain of P. syringae, but environmental groups and protestors delayed the field tests for four years with legal challenges. In 1987, the ice-minus strain of P. syringae became the first genetically modified organism (GMO) to be released into the environment when a strawberry field in California was sprayed with the ice-minus strain of P. syringae. The results were promising, showing lowered frost damage to the treated plants. Lindow also conducted an experiment on a crop of potato seedlings sprayed with ice-minus P. syringae. He was successful in protecting the potato crop from frost damage with a strain of ice-minus P. syringae.

== Controversy ==
At the time of Lindow's work on ice-minus P. syringae, genetic engineering was considered to be very controversial. Jeremy Rifkin and his Foundation on Economic Trends (FET) sued the NIH in federal court to delay the field trials, arguing that NIH had failed to conduct an Environmental Impact Assessment and had failed to explore the possible effects ice-minus bacteria might have on ecosystems and even global weather patterns. Once approval was granted, both test fields were attacked by activist groups the night before the tests occurred: "The world's first trial site attracted the world's first field trasher". The BBC quoted Andy Caffrey from Earth First!: "When I first heard that a company in Berkley was planning to release these bacteria Frostban in my community, I literally felt a knife go into me. Here once again, for a buck, science, technology and corporations were going to invade my body with new bacteria that hadn't existed on the planet before. It had already been invaded by smog, by radiation, by toxic chemicals in my food, and I just wasn't going to take it anymore."

Rifkin's successful legal challenge forced the Reagan Administration to more quickly develop an overarching regulatory policy to guide federal decision-making about agricultural biotechnology. In 1986, the Office of Science and Technology Policy issued the Coordinated Framework for Regulation of Biotechnology, which continues to govern US regulatory decisions.

The controversy drove many biotech companies away from use of genetically engineering microorganisms in agriculture.

== See also ==
- Bacterial ice-nucleation proteins
