= Ribotyping =

Ribotyping is a molecular technique for bacterial identification and characterization that uses information from rRNA-based phylogenetic analyses. It is a rapid and specific method widely used in clinical diagnostics and analysis of microbial communities in food, water, and beverages.

All bacteria have ribosomal genes, but the exact sequence is unique to each species, serving as a genetic fingerprint. Therefore, sequencing the particular 16S gene and comparing it to a database would yield identification of the particular species.

== Technique ==
Ribotyping involves the digestion of bacterial genomic DNA with specific restriction enzymes. Each restriction enzyme cuts DNA at a specific nucleotide sequence, resulting in fragments of different lengths.

Those fragments are then run on a Gel electrophoresis, where they are separated according to size: the application of electrical field to the gel in which they are suspended causes the movement of DNA fragments (all negatively charged due to the presence of phosphate groups) through a matrix towards the positively charged end of the field. Small fragments move more easily and rapidly through the matrix, reaching a bigger distance from the starting position than larger fragments.

Following the separation in the gel matrix, the DNA fragments are moved onto nylon membranes and hybridized with a labelled 16S or 23S rRNA probe. This way only the fragments coding for such rRNA are visualised and can be analyzed. The pattern is then digitized and used to identify the origin of the DNA by a comparison with reference organisms in a computer database.

Conceptually, ribotyping is similar to probing restriction fragments of chromosomal DNA with cloned probes (randomly cloned probes or probes derived from a specific coding sequence such as that of a virulence factor).

== See also ==
- Genotyping
