= Hypersensitive response =

Plant immune response to infection

In plant immunology, the hypersensitive response (HR) is a mechanism used by plants to prevent the spread of infection by microbial pathogens. HR is characterized by the rapid death of cells in the local region surrounding an infection, and it serves to restrict the growth and spread of pathogens to other parts of the plant. It is analogous to the innate immune system found in animals and commonly precedes a slower systemic (whole plant) response, which ultimately leads to systemic acquired resistance (SAR). HR onset is associated with the activation of Resistance (R) proteins, majorly the Nucleotide-binding and Leucine-rich Repeat Proteins (NLRs) in plants, which are intracellular sensors that detect pathogen effectors. When bound to effectors, they assume a conformational change that triggers the HR. HR can be observed in the vast majority of plant species and is induced by a wide range of plant pathogens such as oomycetes, viruses, fungi and even insects.

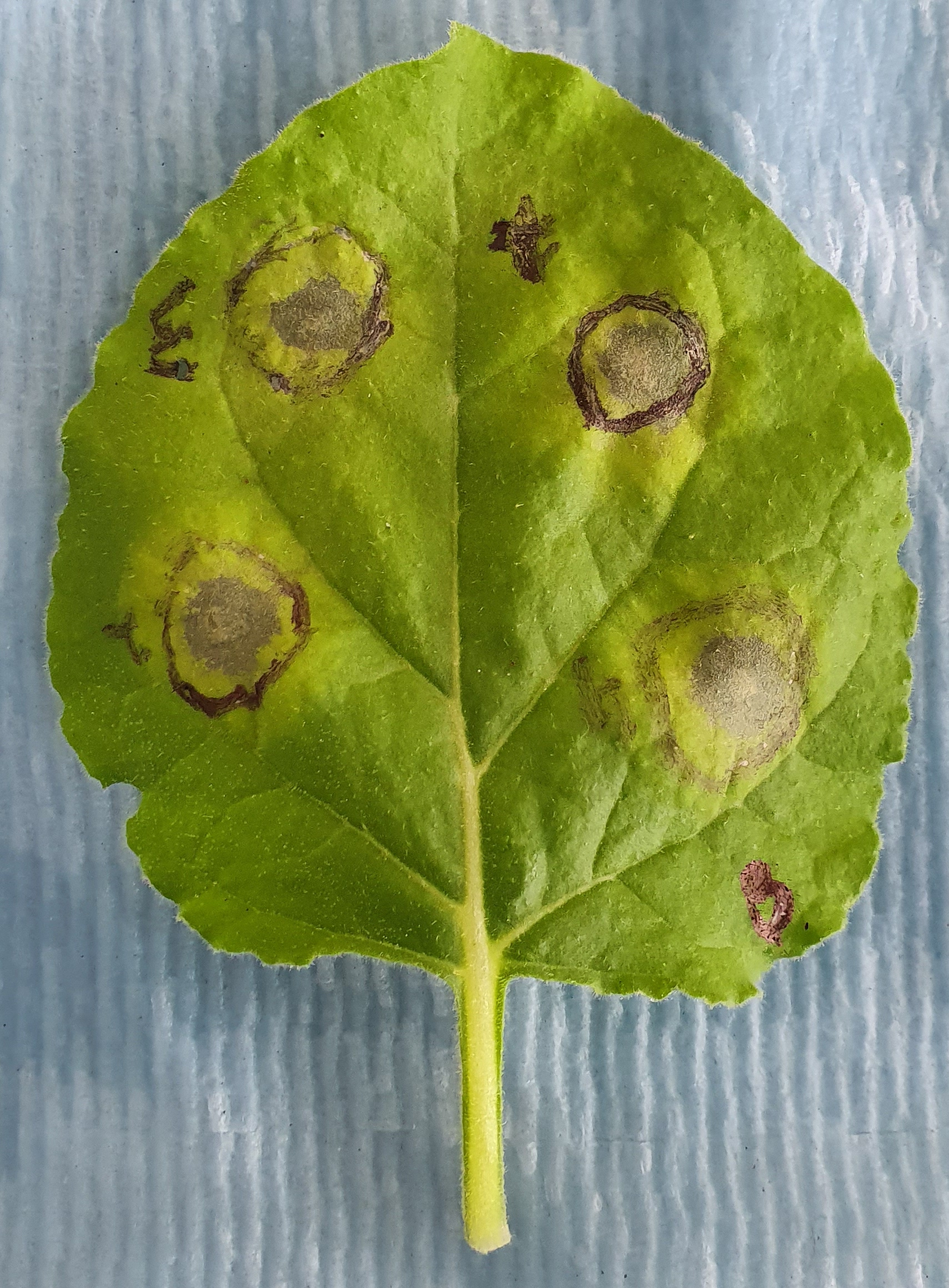
Lesions caused by the plant hypersensitive response

HR is commonly thought of as an effective defense strategy against biotrophic plant pathogens, which require living tissue to gain nutrients. In the case of necrotrophic pathogens, HR might even be beneficial to the pathogen, as they require dead plant cells to obtain nutrients. The situation becomes complicated when considering pathogens such as Phytophthora infestans which at the initial stages of the infection act as biotrophs but later switch to a necrotrophic lifestyle. It is proposed that in this case HR might be beneficial in the early stages of the infection but not in the later stages.

== Genetics ==
The first idea of how the hypersensitive response occurs came from Harold Henry Flor's gene-for-gene model. He postulated that for every resistance (R) gene encoded by the plant, there is a corresponding avirulence (Avr) gene encoded by the microbe. The plant is resistant to the pathogen if both the Avr and R genes are present during the plant-pathogen interaction. These genes, usually, have to be in a dominant state. The genes that are involved in the plant-pathogen interactions tend to evolve at a very rapid rate.

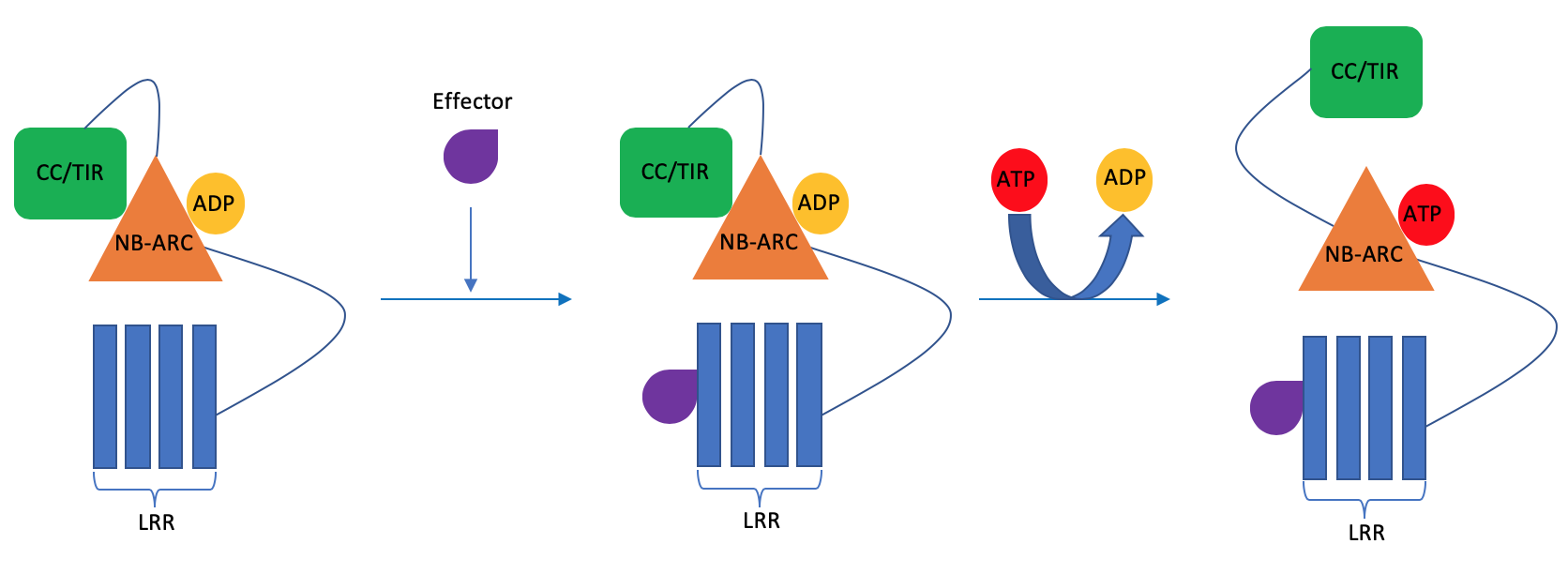
Mechanism of plant NLR protein activation after pathogen invasion

Very often, the resistance mediated by R genes is due to them inducing HR, which leads to apoptosis. Most plant R genes encode the NLRs, which are structurally and functionally similar to the NOD-like receptor (NLR) proteins in animals. NLR protein domain architecture consists of an NB-ARC domain which is a nucleotide-binding domain, responsible for conformational changes associated with the activation of the NLR protein. In the inactive form, the NB-ARC domain is bound to Adenosine diphosphate (ADP). When a pathogen is sensed, the ADP is exchanged for Adenosine triphosphate (ATP) and this induces a conformational change in the NLR protein, which results in HR. At the N-terminus, the NLR either has a Toll-Interleukin receptor (TIR) domain (also found in mammalian toll-like receptors) or a coiled-coil (CC) motif. Both TIR and CC domains are implicated in causing cell death during HR. The C-terminus of the NLRs consists of a leucine-rich repeat (LRR) motif, which is involved in sensing the pathogen virulence factors.

== Mechanism ==
HR is triggered by the plant when it recognizes a pathogen. The identification of a pathogen typically occurs when a virulence gene product, secreted by a pathogen, binds to, or indirectly interacts with, the product of a plant R gene. These 'virulence factors' (effectors) secreted by the invading pathogen are also called 'avirulence (avr) proteins' if the plant has evolved a corresponding R protein to detect them. R genes are highly polymorphic, and many plants produce several different types of R gene products, enabling them to recognize virulence products produced by many different pathogens. The recognition of these effectors triggers Effector-Triggered Immunity (ETI) in plants, characterized by HR to stop infection.

In phase one of the HR, the activation of R genes triggers an ion flux, involving an efflux of hydroxide and potassium out of the cells, and an influx of calcium and hydrogen ions into the cells.

In phase two, the cells involved in the HR generate an oxidative burst by producing reactive oxygen species (ROS), superoxide anions, hydrogen peroxide, hydroxyl radicals, and nitrous oxide. These compounds affect cellular membrane function, in part by inducing lipid peroxidation and by causing lipid damage.

The alteration of ion components in the cell and the breakdown of cellular components in the presence of ROS result in the death of affected cells, as well as the formation of local lesions, widely studied in Maize and Arabidopsis. Reactive oxygen species also trigger the deposition of lignin and callose, as well as the cross-linking of pre-formed hydroxyproline-rich glycoproteins such as P33 to the wall matrix via the tyrosine in the PPPPY motif. These compounds serve to reinforce the walls of cells surrounding the infection, creating a barrier and inhibiting the spread of the infection. Activation of HR also results in disruption of the cytoskeleton, mitochondrial function and metabolic changes, all of which might be implicated in causing cell death.

=== Direct and indirect activation ===
HR can be activated in two main ways: directly and indirectly. Direct binding of the virulence factors to the NLRs can result in the activation of HR. However, this seems to be quite rare. More commonly, the virulence factors target certain cellular proteins that they modify, and this modification is then sensed by NLRs. Indirect recognition seems to be more common as multiple virulence factors can modify the same cellular protein with the same modifications, thus allowing one receptor to recognize multiple virulence factors. Sometimes, the protein domains targeted by the virulence factors are integrated into the NLRs. An example of this can be observed in plant resistance to the rice blast pathogen, where the RGA5 NLR has a heavy-metal-associated (HMA) domain integrated into its structure, which is targeted by multiple effector proteins.

An example of indirect recognition: AvrPphB is a type III effector protein secreted by Pseudomonas syringae. This is a protease which cleaves a cellular kinase called PBS1. The modified kinase is sensed by RPS5 NLR.

=== The Resistosome ===
Recent structural studies of CC-NLR proteins have suggested that after the virulence factors are sensed, the CC-NLRs assemble into a pentameric structure known as the resistosome. The resistosome seems to have a high affinity for the cellular membrane. When the resistosome is assembled, a helix sticks out from the N-terminus of each NLR and this creates a pore in the membrane which allows leakage of ions to occur and thus the cell dies. However, this mechanism is only inferred from the structure and there are currently no mechanistic studies to support this. It is still not known how the TIR-NLR proteins are activated. Recent research suggests that they require CC-NLR proteins downstream of them, which are then activated to form the resistosomes and induce HR.

=== NLR pairs and networks ===
It is known that NLRs can function individually, but there are also cases where the NLR proteins work in pairs. The pair consists of a sensor NLR and a helper NLR. The sensor NLR is responsible for recognizing the pathogen-secreted effector protein and activating the helper NLR, which then executes the cell death. The genes of both the sensor and the respective helper NLR are usually paired in the genome, and their expression could be controlled by the same promoter. This allows the functional pair, instead of individual components, to be segregated during cell division and also ensures that equal amounts of both NLRs are made in the cell.

The receptor pairs work through two main mechanisms: negative regulation or cooperation.

In the negative regulation scenario, the sensor NLR is responsible for negatively regulating the helper NLR and preventing cell death under normal conditions. However, when the effector protein is introduced and recognized by the sensor NLR, the negative regulation of the helper NLR is relieved, and HR is induced. In the cooperation mechanisms, when the sensor NLR recognizes the effector protein, it signals to the helper NLR, thus activating it.

Recently, it was discovered that in addition to acting as singletons or pairs, the plant NLRs can act in networks. In these networks, there are usually many sensor NLRs paired to relatively few helper NLRs. The HR pathway also includes some multi-protein signaling cascades which pilot ion flux, membrane disruption, and localized cell death associated with effector recognition in the invaded cell. Helper NLR such as NRG1, ADR1 which act downstream of sensor NLRs in TIR-domain signaling, were reported to engage additional immune components to trigger defense responses.

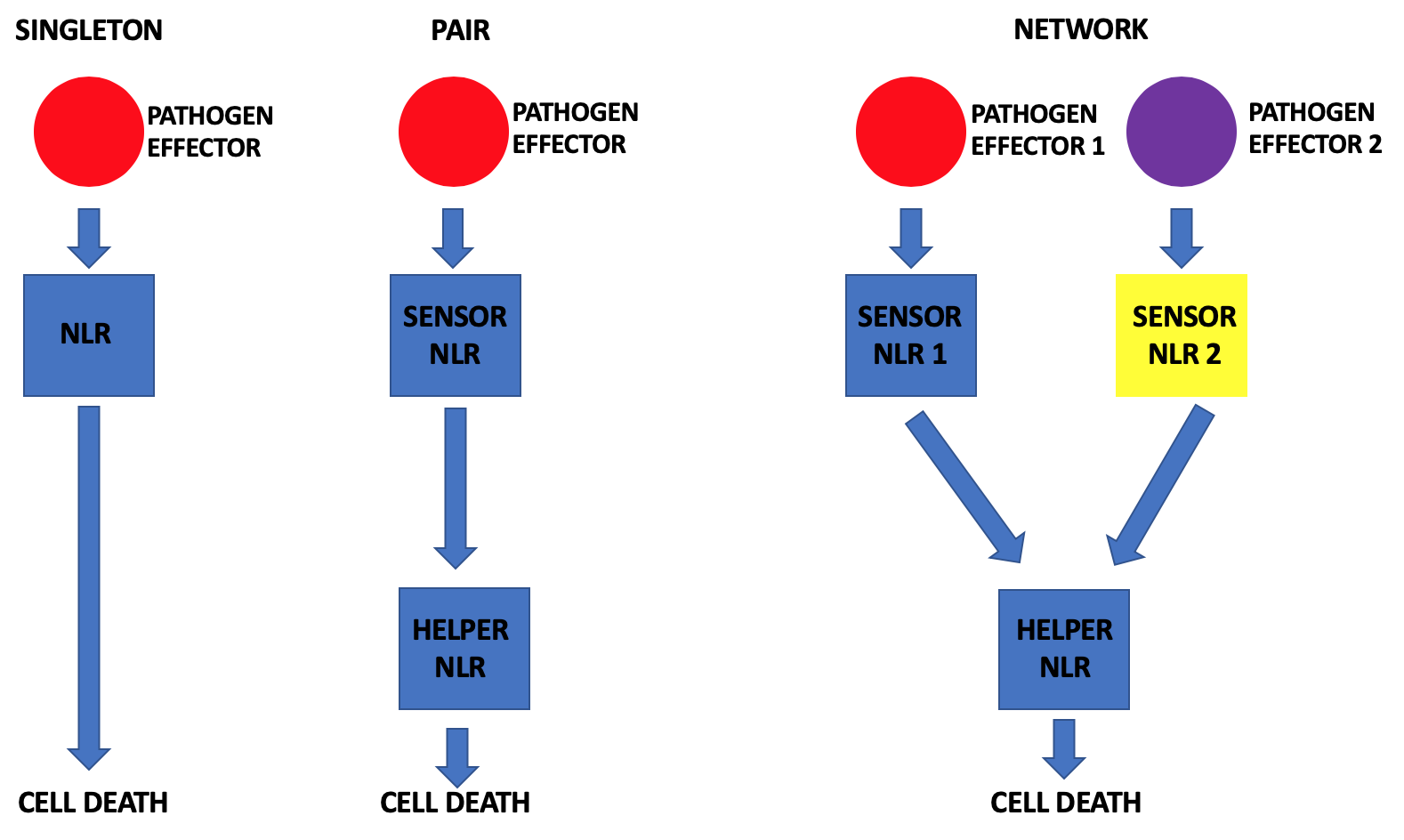
NLR Singleton, Pair and Network

One example of proteins involved in NLR networks are those belonging to the NRC superclade. It seems that the networks evolved from a duplication event of a genetically linked NLR pair into an unlinked locus which allowed the new pair to evolve to respond to a new pathogen. This separation seems to provide plasticity to the system, as it allows the sensor NLRs to evolve more rapidly in response to the fast evolution of pathogen effectors whereas the helper NLR can evolve much slower to maintain its ability to induce HR. However, it seems that during evolution new helper NLRs also evolved, supposedly, because certain sensor NLRs require specific helper NLRs to function optimally.

Bioinformatic analysis of plant NLRs has shown that there is a conserved MADA motif at the N-terminus of helper NLRs but not sensor NLRs. Around 20% of all CC-NLRs have the MADA motif, implying the motif's importance for the execution of HR.

Recent studies on the NLR signaling pathway have shed more light on its activation. It was shown that different NLR clades can form resistosomes with distinct architectures and signaling outputs. Scientists have discovered octameric resistosomes in wheat, opposed to the previously known pentameric and hexameric assemblies in plants; this suggests a diverse immune complex architecture across plant lineages and NLR subclasses and broader participation of these factors in HR than previously known.

== Regulation ==
Accidental activation of HR through the NLR proteins could cause vast destruction of the plant tissue, thus, the NLRs are kept in an inactive form through tight negative regulation at both transcriptional and post-translational levels. Under normal conditions, the mRNA of NLRs are transcribed at very low levels, which results in low levels of protein in the cell. The NLRs also require a considerable number of chaperone proteins for their folding. Misfolded proteins are immediately ubiquitinated and degraded by the proteasome. It has been observed that in many cases, if the chaperone proteins involved in NLR biosynthesis are knocked-out, HR is abolished and NLR levels are significantly reduced.

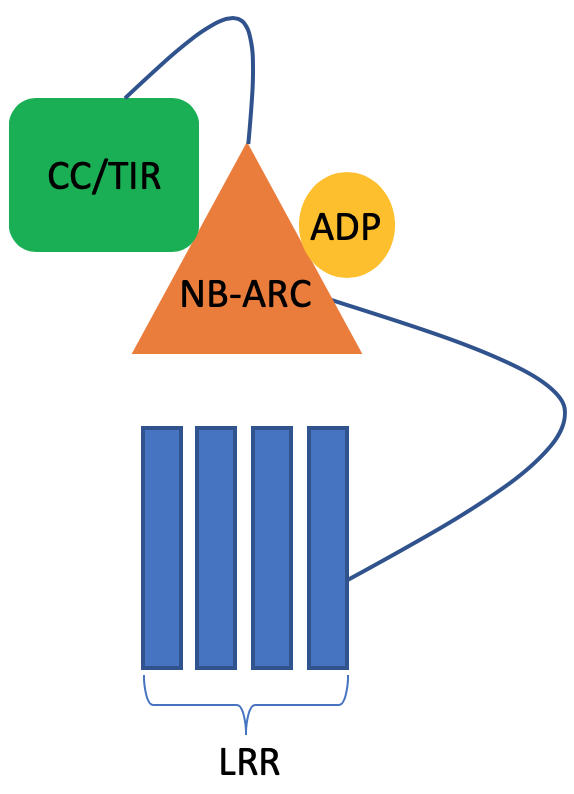
The domain structure of a typical plant NLR

Intramolecular interactions are also essential for the regulation of HR. The NLR proteins are not linear: the NB-ARC domain is sandwiched in between the LRR and TIR/CC domains. Under normal conditions, there is a lot more ATP present in the cytoplasm than ADP, and this arrangement of the NLR proteins prevents the spontaneous exchange of ADP for ATP and thus activation of HR. Only when a virulence factor is sensed, the ADP is exchanged for ATP.

Mutations in certain components of plant defense machinery result in HR being activated without the presence of pathogen effector proteins. Some of these mutations are observed in NLR genes and cause these NLR proteins to become auto-active due to disrupted intramolecular regulatory mechanisms. Other mutations causing spontaneous HR are present in proteins involved in ROS production during pathogen invasion.

HR is also a temperature-sensitive process and it has been observed that in many cases plant-pathogen interactions do not induce HR at temperatures above 30 °C, which subsequently leads to increased susceptibility to the pathogen. The mechanisms behind the influence of temperature on plant resistance to pathogens are not understood in detail, however, research suggests that the NLR protein levels might be important in this regulation. It is also proposed that at higher temperatures the NLR proteins are less likely to form oligomeric complexes, thus inhibiting their ability to induce HR.

It has also been shown that HR is dependent on the light conditions, which could be linked to the activity of chloroplasts and mainly their ability to generate ROS.

== Mediators ==
Several enzymes have been shown to be involved in the generation of ROS. For example, copper amine oxidase, catalyzes the oxidative deamination of polyamines, especially putrescine, and releases the ROS mediators hydrogen peroxide and ammonia. Other enzymes thought to play a role in ROS production include xanthine oxidase, NADPH oxidase, oxalate oxidase, peroxidases, and flavin containing amine oxidases.

In some cases, the cells surrounding the lesion synthesize antimicrobial compounds, including phenolics, phytoalexins, and pathogenesis related (PR) proteins, including β-glucanases and chitinases. These compounds may act by puncturing bacterial cell walls; or by delaying maturation, disrupting metabolism, or preventing reproduction of the pathogen in question.

Studies have suggested that the actual mode and sequence of the dismantling of plant cellular components depend on each individual plant-pathogen interaction, but all HR seem to require the involvement of cysteine proteases. The induction of cell death and the clearance of pathogens also requires active protein synthesis, an intact actin cytoskeleton, and the presence of salicylic acid.

== Pathogen evasion ==
Pathogens have evolved several strategies to suppress plant defense responses. Host processes usually targeted by bacteria include; alterations to programmed cell death pathways, inhibiting cell wall-based defenses, and altering plant hormone signaling and expression of defense genes.

== Systemic immunity ==
Local initiation of HR in response to certain necrotrophic pathogens has been shown to allow the plants to develop systemic immunity against the pathogen. Scientists have been trying to exploit the ability of HR to induce systemic resistance in plants in order to create transgenic plants resistant to certain pathogens. Pathogen-inducible promoters have been linked to auto-active NLR genes to induce HR response only when the pathogen is present but not at any other time. This approach, however, has been mostly unfeasible, as the modification also leads to a substantial reduction in plant yields.

Recent efforts have achieved significant success, preserving the protective effect of HR while reducing the associated growth penalties. Researchers have adapted a virus-inducible promoter to regulate the expression and activation of an HR cassette developed, consisting of Avr/R gene pair, the Avr4/Cf-4 effector-resistance genes, under the geminivirus-inducible Solyc04g076730 promoter expressed in Nicotiana benthamiana. They achieved HR activation only when the virus was present, presenting a targeted, streamlined defense strategy with lowered growth penalties.

== Hypersensitive response as a driver for plant speciation ==
It has been noticed in Arabidopsis that sometimes when two different plant lines are crossed together, the offspring show signs of hybrid necrosis. This is due to the parent plants containing incompatible NLRs, which when expressed together in the same cell, induce spontaneous HR.

This observation raised a hypothesis that plant pathogens can lead to the speciation of plants – if plant populations from the same species develop incompatible NLRs in response to different pathogen effectors, this can lead to hybrid necrosis in the F1 offspring, which substantially reduces the fitness of the offspring and gene flow to subsequent generations.

== Comparison to animal innate immunity ==
Both plants and animals have NLR proteins which seem to have the same biological function – to induce cell death. The N-termini of plant and animal NLRs vary but it seems that both have LRR domains at the C-terminus.

A big difference between animal and plant NLRs is in what they recognise. Animal NLRs mainly recognise pathogen-associated molecular patterns (PAMPs), while plant NLRs mostly recognise pathogen effector proteins. This makes sense as NLRs are present inside of the cell and plants rarely have intracellular pathogens, except for viruses and viruses do not have PAMPs as they are rapidly evolving. Animals, on the other hand, have intracellular pathogens.

The vast majority of plant lineages, except for certain algae, such as Chlamydomonas, have NLRs. NLRs are also present in many animal species, however, they are not present in, for example, Drosophila melanogaster and Arthropods.

Upon recognition of PAMPs by NLRs in animals, the NLRs oligomerise to form a structure known as the inflammasome, which activates pyroptosis. In plants, structural studies have suggested that the NLRs also oligomerise to form a structure called the resistosome, which also leads to cell death. It seems that in both plants and animals, the formation of the resistosome or the inflammasome, respectively, leads to cell death by forming pores in the membrane. It is inferred from protein structures that in plants the NLRs themselves are responsible for forming pores in the membrane, while in the case of the inflammasome, the pore-forming activity arises from gasdermin D which is cleaved by caspases as a result of the oligomerisation of the NLRs. Plant cells do not have caspases.

== See also ==
- Plant disease resistance
- Phytopathogen
- Plant hormones
- Systemic acquired resistance
- Antimicrobial peptide
