= Vertifolia effect =

Genetic phenomenon in plant pathology

The Vertifolia effect is a well documented phenomenon in the fields of plant breeding and plant pathology. It is characterized by the erosion of a crop's horizontal resistance to disease during a breeding cycle due to the presence of strong vertical resistance, characterized by the presence of R genes. This effect was observed in late blight of potato. This phenomenon was first described by J.E. Van der Plank in his 1963 book Plant Disease: Epidemics and Control. Van der Plank observed that under artificial selection the potato variety Vertifolia had stronger vertical resistance to the potato late blight pathogen, Phytophthora infestans, as measured by the presence of specific R genes. However, when the pathogen overcame these R genes Vertifolia exhibited a greater loss of horizontal resistance than varieties with fewer R genes and lower vertical resistance. This effect suggests that when a pathogen evolves an avirulence gene to counteract a variety's R gene, that variety will be more susceptible to the pathogen than other varieties.

The Vertifolia effect has important implications for the breeding of disease resistant crops. To avoid it plant breeders may opt to cross in R genes or insert transgenes at the end of the breeding cycle to maintain levels of horizontal resistance during early rounds of selection. It is also suggests that breeders should focus on enhancing horizontal resistance to avoid potential catastrophic crop losses. Though the effect is a frequently observed phenomenon among plant breeders and plant pathologists, it is difficult to document and there are situations where it does not hold true.
