= Gene-for-gene interactions in rust fungi =

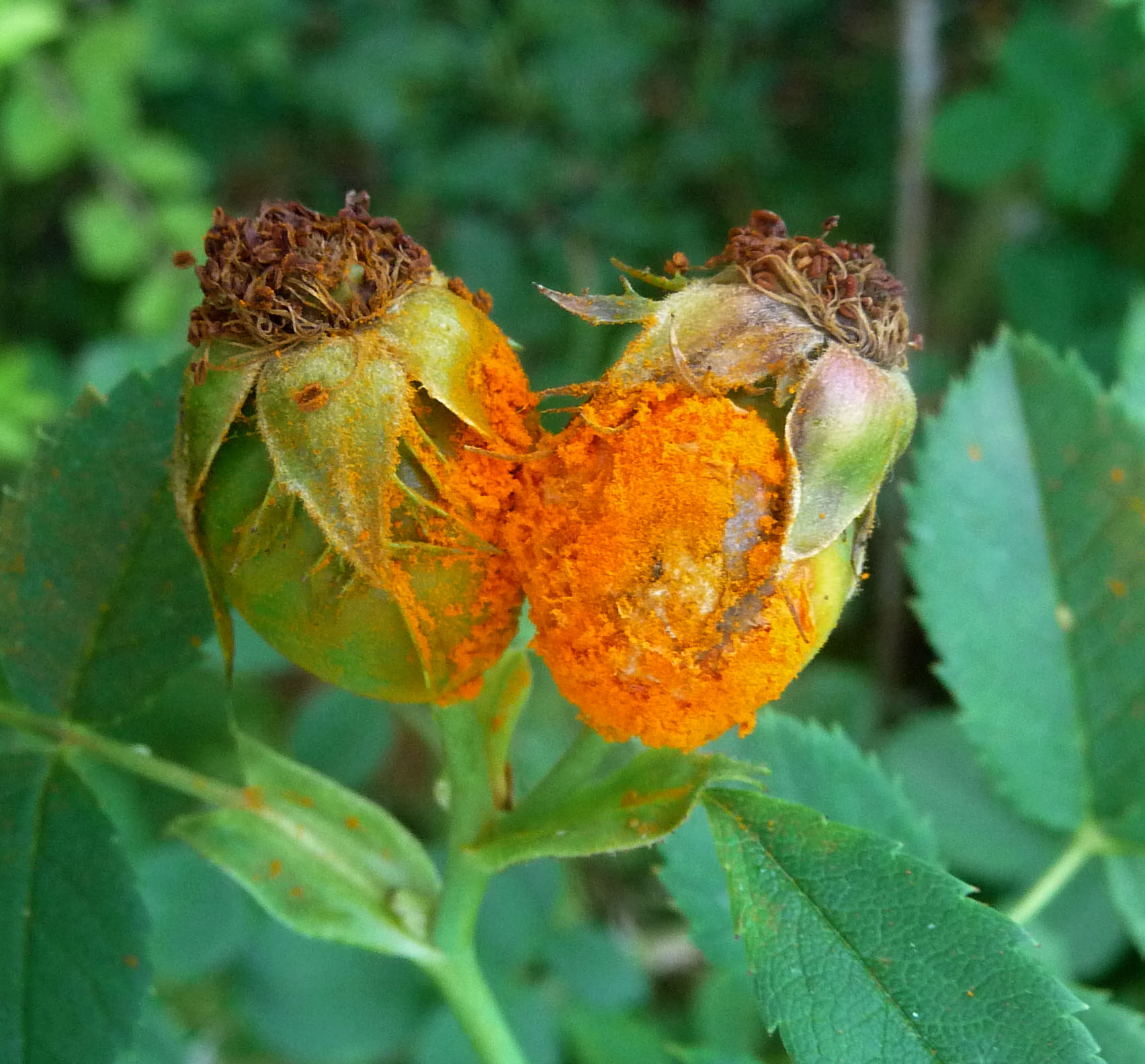
Rust fungi on a plant

The study of gene-for-gene interactions uncovers genetic components, evolutionary impacts, and ecological/economic implications between rust fungi and plants. Rust fungi utilize the gene-for-gene interaction to invade host plants. Conversely, host plants utilize the gene-for-gene interaction to prevent invasion of rust fungi.

Studying gene-for-gene interactions between plants and rust fungi aids in understanding the ecology and evolution of plant-microbe interactions, specifically pathogenicity. There are implications of gene-for-gene interactions for fitness in real world populations. Co-evolution due to gene-for-gene interactions can yield explanations of evolutionary advantages and disadvantages. Co-evolution can help understand how the host-pathogen interactions adapt in natural environments, why they have fitness benefits/costs, and the agricultural impacts.

== Rust taxonomy ==
Rust fungi belong to the phylum Basidiomycota. Rusts are typically obligate plant pathogens which alter the morphology of a plant. However, according to Littlefield, not all rusts are obligate pathogens as some have been cultured without requiring a living host. Spores created by the rust fungus allow dispersal to other plants. Rust fungi have up to five different spore stages. Spore stages allow for rusts to infect one or more different plant species. All of the five spore stages are not part of the life cycle of every rust fungus. Overall, rusts are a concern to agriculture due to their negative impacts on yield and survival.

== History ==
The gene-for-gene theory was put forward by the plant pathologist, Harold Henry Flor. Flor explained how pathogenic genes and resistance genes worked together to control disease development in plants. He specifically worked with the rust fungus, Melampsora lini, and the flax host, Linum usitatissimum. Using Mendelian genetics, Flor examined the interaction between rust and flax. His findings provided insights into pathogen virulence/avirulence and plant resistance/susceptibility. Flor's theory provides a genetic perspective on plant-pathogen interactions. His work has been heavily cited by other pathologists.

== Genetic components ==
=== Gene-for-gene genetics ===
Gene-for-Gene theory involves two types of genes. One comes from the host and the other from the pathogen. Resistance (R) genes reside in the host plant and are vertically transferred. Avirulence (Avr) genes are the pathogen genes. Flor observed that both susceptibility/resistance and virulence/virulence depend on a single gene. (Note: p. 35, "In each instance the observed ratio of avirulent to virulent cultures approximated that expected if the heterozygosity of each race was due to a single gene conditioning pathogenicity on the variety to which the selfed culture segregated.")

Avirulent genes are the genetic makeup that determines the ability of the rust to infect its host. Flor found which alleles of avirulence genes permit infection. Avr genotypes are either dominant (AVR) or recessive (avr). On the other end, resistance genes determine the ability of the plant to ward off the pathogen. R genotypes are dominant (RR) or recessive (rr).

A pathogen with a homozygous or heterozygous dominant (AVR) genotype will not infect the host if the host is homozygous or heterozygous dominant (RR). However, the dominant pathogen genotype will infect a host if it expresses a homozygous recessive (rr) genotype. A homozygous recessive (avr) pathogen genotype will infect a host for both dominant and recessive R genotypes.

=== Races of flax rust ===
Physiological races are the multiple strains of the rust fungi that differ in their behavior. Flor detailed the genetics that determine the race of rust fungi. Rust races are determined by the different alleles at the avirulence loci.

Studies show that pathogenicity in flax rust and resistance of flax are in a gene-for-gene relationship. Flor classified races using field studies looking at 18 flax rust lines. Each flax line contained a single rust-conditioning gene. The single rust-conditioning gene is a more frequent favored gene in a given environment. Flor differentiated races by comparing the flax rust lines to known North American races, specifically their resistance. This allowed for the identification of flax rust races to be based on particular diagnostic resistances or susceptibilities. Flor believed this new method to identify races will promote rust resistance and help understand the role of hybridization and mutation as new races of rust emerge.

=== Inducing mutations ===
Single genes have been found to condition pathogenicity, as revealed by mutations. Flor used ultraviolet radiation as a mutagenic agent. A mutation in the avirulence allele allows the fungus to infect the host. Due to the mutation, the host no longer is able to detect the fungus. The experiment found that mutations are capable of making a pathogen virulent in flax. As Flor believed, this experiment suggested that mutations in nature allow for the development of new rust races. Overall, Flor demonstrated how single rust-conditioning genes are able to determine pathogenicity and how they can be readily manipulated.

== Evolutionary impact ==
=== Evolutionary dynamics ===
Host resistance and pathogenic genes give insight into how a pathogen prevails and how diseases spread. Thrall et al. explain how gene-for-gene models indicate that dispersal of pathogen-host interactions function outside of the lab, specifically in metapopulations. A metapopulation is a "population of populations," where the same species is spatially distributed in habitat patches. Each patch independently determines its dynamics of species. Another study by Pecanka et al. utilized a two-simulation model consisting of five resistance and five virulence genes. They were distributed in populations with gene-flow, migration, mutation, and co-evolution. The study determined that gene-for-gene exerts a fitness cost in both pathogen and host and affects their life histories.

Co-evolution is the process of mutual changes in genetics that unfold over time in both rusts and their hosts. Co-evolution has provided a new look into the genetics and molecular aspects of the interaction between pathogens and their host. Woolhouse et al. have suggested that further research into the exact genes involved in mutual polymorphism need to be examined at a cellular level. This includes the types of nucleotides involved in DNA sequences and mutations. This indicates that pathogen genotypes and host genotypes should be compared side by side to each other.

Co-evolution involving gene-for-gene interactions is important to understand for evolutionary reasons. Co-evolution could possibly have biomedical importance in terms of new ways to fight diseases. Hence, Woolhouse et al. stress how pathogen-host interactions should be studied more rigorously.

Other studies provide examples of how studying co-evolution at a population level is evolutionarily important. Thompson and Burdon describe how co-evolution plays a role in both agriculture and natural populations. Gene-for-gene interactions inherit differently in natural populations compared to agriculture. Agriculture is controlled by humans to alter seed genetics and thus works differently from mating and natural selection in natural populations. They found that gene-for-gene co-evolution has a role in local agriculture. This is due to the need for crops to maintain an amount of resistance to pathogens. Thompson and Burdon describe how agriculture rules out the evolutionary arms race.

== Ecological and economic implications ==
=== Influences of climate change ===
Zhan et al. conducted a study to understand how climate change affects the rust fungus, Triphragmium ulmariae, and its host, Filipendula ulmaria. They used metapopulations in 70 islands to look at the prevalence, severity, and incidence of the pathogen during temporal changes. They found evidence for an increase in extinction of T. ulmariae in relation to climate change of increasing temperature. There was a lower prevalence of the pathogen in F. ulmaria. Thus, T. ulmariae and F. ulmaria give example of how warming climate change influences the epidemiology of pathogens.

This study holds that pathogens are beneficial when they do not have the extremely high prevalence that characterizes an epidemic. Zhan et al. found that mild winter temperatures showed a great increase in pathogen prevalence, leading to epidemics. High temperatures cause more extinction rates of rust pathogens. These pathogens allow host plants to be genetically diverse in terms of resistance to pathogens. Thus, pathogens provide plants the opportunity to diversify their resistance genes to overcome pathogen associations. Zhan et al. suggests that further research should be conducted into how a lack of pathogens might disrupt natural ecosystems leading to a change in the structure of communities and interactions.

=== Effects on agriculture ===
Understanding host-pathogen interactions on the basis of the gene-for-gene theory provides insights into how this interaction works in agriculture. Resistance genes play an important role in agriculture every day. This interaction is a large part of host-pathogen co-evolution, so understanding gene-for-gene is important to understand co-evolution in general. According to Dodds and Rathjen, co-evolution by gene-for-gene interactions strengthens the plant immune system. They suggest that knowing the genetics in these co-evolution/gene-for-gene interactions can help create technologies to alter crop immune systems. Particularly, the introduction of PAMP-recognition for certain pathogens by the use of effector proteins in the ETI immune system.

== Summary ==
Gene-for-gene interactions in rust fungi uncover genetic components of fungi and their hosts. In particular, Flor distinguished the different alleles in resistance and avirulence genes. These genes determine how rust fungi permit infection to their host and how the host can resist infection. In addition, Flor developed a chart to distinguish races of flax rust. Flor believes the identification of flax rust races can promote the pathogenicity of rust fungi, which he tested using ultraviolet radiation.

Gene-for-gene interactions helps determine the evolutionary dynamics of rust fungi. Pecanka found that gene-for-gene exerts a fitness cost in the pathogen and host, which affects their life histories. Further research demonstrates that host and pathogen genotypes should be compared side by side to understand phylogeny. As Woolhouse states, a better understanding of co-evolution involving gene-for-gene interactions could possibly have biomedical importance, which can lead to new ways to fight diseases. Furthermore, Thompson and Burdon review unnatural evolution in agriculture, in which humans manipulate the evolutionary arms race.

Next, gene-for-gene interactions in rust fungi have ecological and economic implications. Zhan et al. experimented with Triphragmium ulmariae and Filipendula ulmaria to examine how increasing temperatures affect pathogen-host interactions. The study found that the rust fungus showed high levels of extinction in warmer climates. This result can help understand how a lack of pathogens might disrupt natural ecosystems and diversity of resistance genes in plants. Finally, Dodds and Rathjen explain how gene-for-gene interactions in rust fungi have economic consequences. They suggest that knowing the genetics and co-evolution of gene-for-gene interactions can help strengthen plant immune systems, which will provide more efficient growth of crops.
