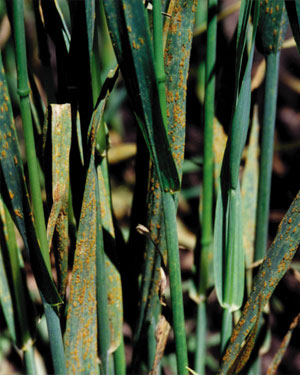

Scientific classification
- Kingdom: Fungi
- Division: Basidiomycota
- Class: Pucciniomycetes
- Order: Pucciniales
- Family: Pucciniaceae
- Genus: Puccinia
- Species: P. coronata

Binomial name
- Puccinia coronata Corda (1837)

Synonyms
- Aecidium crassum Pers. (1801); Aecidium rhamni J.F.Gmel. (1792); Puccinia calamagrostidis P.Syd. (1892); Puccinia coronata f. agrostidis Erikss. (1894); Puccinia coronata f.sp. alopecuri P.Syd. & Syd. (1903); Puccinia coronata f.sp. avenae P.Syd. & Syd. (1903); Puccinia coronata f.sp. festucae P.Syd. & Syd. (1903); Puccinia coronata f.sp. holci P.Syd. & Syd. (1903); Puccinia coronata f.sp. lolii P.Syd. & Syd. (1903); Puccinia coronata var. arrhenatheri Kleb. Puccinia coronata var. calamagrostis W.P.Fraser & Ledingham (1933); Puccinia coronata var. festucae Erikss. Puccinia coronata var. holci Kleb. Puccinia coronata var. lolii Beeynck (1853); Puccinia lolii E.Nielsen (1875); Puccinia rhamni (J.F.Gmel.) Wettst. Solenodonta coronata (Corda) Syd. (1921)

= Puccinia coronata =

Species of fungus

Puccinia coronata is a plant pathogen and causal agent of oat and barley crown rust. The pathogen occurs worldwide, infecting both wild and cultivated oats. Crown rust poses a threat to barley production, because the first infections in barley occur early in the season from local inoculum. In oats, damage fluctuates per year, and may be trivial in damage some years or may account for over 30% of crop damage other years. Crown rusts have evolved many different physiological races within different species in response to host resistance. Each pathogenic race can attack a specific line of plants within the species typical host. For example, there are over 290 races of P. coronata. Crops with resistant phenotypes are often released, but within a few years virulent races have arisen and P. coronata can infect them..

== Symptoms ==
Uredinia are responsible for the actual damage and are powdery, light orange, linear, and occur mostly on the leaf blades but occasionally occur also on leaf sheaths, peduncles and awns. Extensive chlorosis is often associated with the uredinia. Telia are mostly linear, black to dark brown, and are covered by the host epidermis. Although infection by crown rust does not usually kill whole plants, it does kill individual leaves of the plants. Necrotic areas of infected leaves reflect tissue death. The expansion of disease-dependent chlorosis and necrosis greatly reduces photosynthetic processes and the overall physiological functioning of the infected plant, which in turn reduces growth and crop yields. In addition, if plants are badly infected, they become more sensitive to drought conditions which can cause death.

== Disease cycle ==
=== Barley rust ===
Teliospores on barley straw and residue of susceptible grasses left in the field germinate in the spring and produce basidiospores that infect Rhamnus cathartica. Pycnial and aecial stages are produced on the alternate host. Aeciospores from R. cathartica are the primary inoculum for infecting barley. The primary infections, which can occur as early as the three leaf stage of barley in the spring, develop into uredinia. Urediniospores produced in the uredinia repeat the infection process, and the fungus undergoes several cycles of reproduction on barley during the growing season. Spread by wind-borne urediniospores can carry the fungus some distance from the R. cathartica bushes that were the original sources of primary inoculum, although such secondary spread seems much less extensive than that for oat crown rust. In fact, P. c. f.sp. avenae can remain viable over dispersal distances of several hundred miles.

Barley crown rust can infect rye as well as barley. In addition, it also infects a number of wild grasses including quackgrass (Elymus repens), slender wheatgrass (E. tranchycaulus), western wheatgrass (Pascopyrum smithii), foxtail barley (Hordeum jubatum), and several wheatgrasses (Elymus, syn. Elytrigia, spp.) and wild rye grasses (Elymus spp. and Leymus spp.). The fungus readily forms telia on these hosts, which serve as a reservoir of overwintering teliospores. Quackgrass may be the most important reservoir for overwintering telia. This ubiquitous, perennial weed is very susceptible to the rust and is often found growing near Rhamnus.

=== Oat rust ===
The spores of the uredinial pustules are blown away and a new generation arises in 8-10 days. They overwinter in the uredinial stage in warm areas such as the US Gulf Coast on winter oat crops. They then blow northbound when spring-sown oats arise. In climates with cold winters, the buckthorn may play a role. Black lesions called telia develop as oats mature to generate spores, which survive cold winters. In spring, these spores germinate on buckthorn and infect them, but not oats. This is followed by a reverse type of spore in which oats are infected but not buckthorn. The cycle starts again as uredinia on oats.

== Intra-specific classification ==
Uredinial/telial stages also occur on a wide range of grass species (Poaceae) in the genera Agrostis, Arrhenatherum, Bromus, Calamagrostis, Elymus, Festuca, Glyceria, Holcus, Hordeum, Lolium, Poa and Schedonorus etc. Recent molecular studies suggest that with high intraspecific genetic variation, Puccinia coronata harbors multiple phylogenetic lineages. Seven phylogenetic species are recognized based on host specificity, morphology and multi-gene phylogenetic analyses, namely P. coronata s.str., P. coronati-agrostidis, P. coronati-brevispora, P. coronati-calamagrostidis, P. coronati-hordei, P. coronati-japonica, and P. coronati-longispora. Puccinia coronata s.str. is further divided into two varieties: P. coronata var. avenae and P. coronata var. coronata. The former is composed of two formae speciales: P. coronata var. avenae f.sp. avenae and P. coronata var. avenae f.sp. graminicola. The crown rust pathogen on oats belongs to P. coronata var. avenae f.sp. avenae.

== Management ==
Sources of resistance to crown rust have been identified in barley germplasm from diverse regions, but most malting barley cultivars currently grown in the northern Great Plains of North America are susceptible to crown rust. Typically P. coronata can overcome resistant gene within five years, making it difficult for researchers to control its damaging effects on the oat production industry. Agricultural Research Service researchers have introduced individual genes that produce proteins believed to recognize crown rust and trigger a defensive response within the plant. Because of P. coronata’s quick ability to adapt to resistant strains of oat, researchers have had to turn to a new variety of oat (A. barbata), which is commonly considered a weed, for new resistant genes. In lab studies A. barbata has done remarkably well in conferring resistance to various strains of crown rust. The main goal of the researchers is to not only confer resistance to crown rust, but also to develop oat varieties with additional desirable traits such as high yield and drought tolerance.

== History of study ==
Research into P. coronata on A. sativa/oat crown rust has been foundational to the understanding and definition of "tolerance" in phytopathology. In 1958 Caldwell et al. defined tolerance as that which "enabl[es] a susceptible plant to endure severe attack by a rust fungus without sustaining severe losses in yield or quality." Although they noted that most interest was in breeding for hypersensitive responses, they located, differentiated, quantified, and defined "tolerance" for the first time in cultivars prevalent in the United States.

== See also ==
- List of Puccinia species
