= Plant disease resistance =

Ability of plants to withstand pathogens

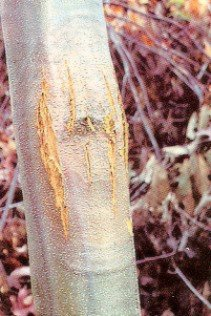
Cankers caused by Chestnut blight, a disease that affects the chestnut tree

This diagram shows the process from fungi or bacterial attachment to the plant cell all the way to the specific type of response. PTI stands for Pattern-Triggered Immunity and ETI stands for Effector-triggered immunity.

Plant disease resistance protects plants from pathogens in two ways: by pre-formed structures and chemicals, and by infection-induced responses of the immune system. Relative to a susceptible plant, disease resistance is the reduction of pathogen growth on or in the plant (and hence a reduction of disease), while the term disease tolerance describes plants that exhibit little disease damage despite substantial pathogen levels. Disease outcome is determined by the three-way interaction of the pathogen, the plant, and the environmental conditions (an interaction known as the disease triangle).

Defense-activating compounds can move cell-to-cell and systematically through the plant's vascular system. However, plants do not have circulating immune cells, so most cell types exhibit a broad suite of antimicrobial defenses. Although obvious qualitative differences in disease resistance can be observed when multiple specimens are compared (allowing classification as "resistant" or "susceptible" after infection by the same pathogen strain at similar inoculum levels in similar environments), a gradation of quantitative differences in disease resistance is more typically observed between plant strains or genotypes. Plants consistently resist certain pathogens but succumb to others; resistance is usually specific to certain pathogen species or pathogen strains.

== Background ==
Plant disease resistance is crucial to the reliable production of food, and it provides significant reductions in agricultural use of land, water, fuel, and other inputs. Plants in both natural and cultivated populations carry inherent disease resistance, but this has not always protected them.

The late blight Great Famine of Ireland of the 1840s was caused by the oomycete Phytophthora infestans. The world's first mass-cultivated banana cultivar Gros Michel was lost in the 1920s to Panama disease caused by the fungus Fusarium oxysporum. The current wheat stem rust, leaf rust, and yellow stripe rust epidemics spreading from East Africa into the Indian subcontinent are caused by rust fungi Puccinia graminis and P. striiformis. Other epidemics include chestnut blight, as well as recurrent severe plant diseases such as rice blast, soybean cyst nematode, and citrus canker.

Plant pathogens can spread rapidly over great distances, vectored by water, wind, insects, and humans. Across large regions and many crop species, it is estimated that diseases typically reduce plant yields by 10% every year in more developed nations or agricultural systems, but yield loss to diseases often exceeds 20% in less developed settings.

However, disease control is reasonably successful for most crops. Disease control is achieved by use of plants that have been bred for good resistance to many diseases, and by plant cultivation approaches such as crop rotation, pathogen-free seed, appropriate planting date and plant density, control of field moisture, and pesticide use.

== Common disease resistance mechanisms ==
=== Pre-formed structures and compounds ===
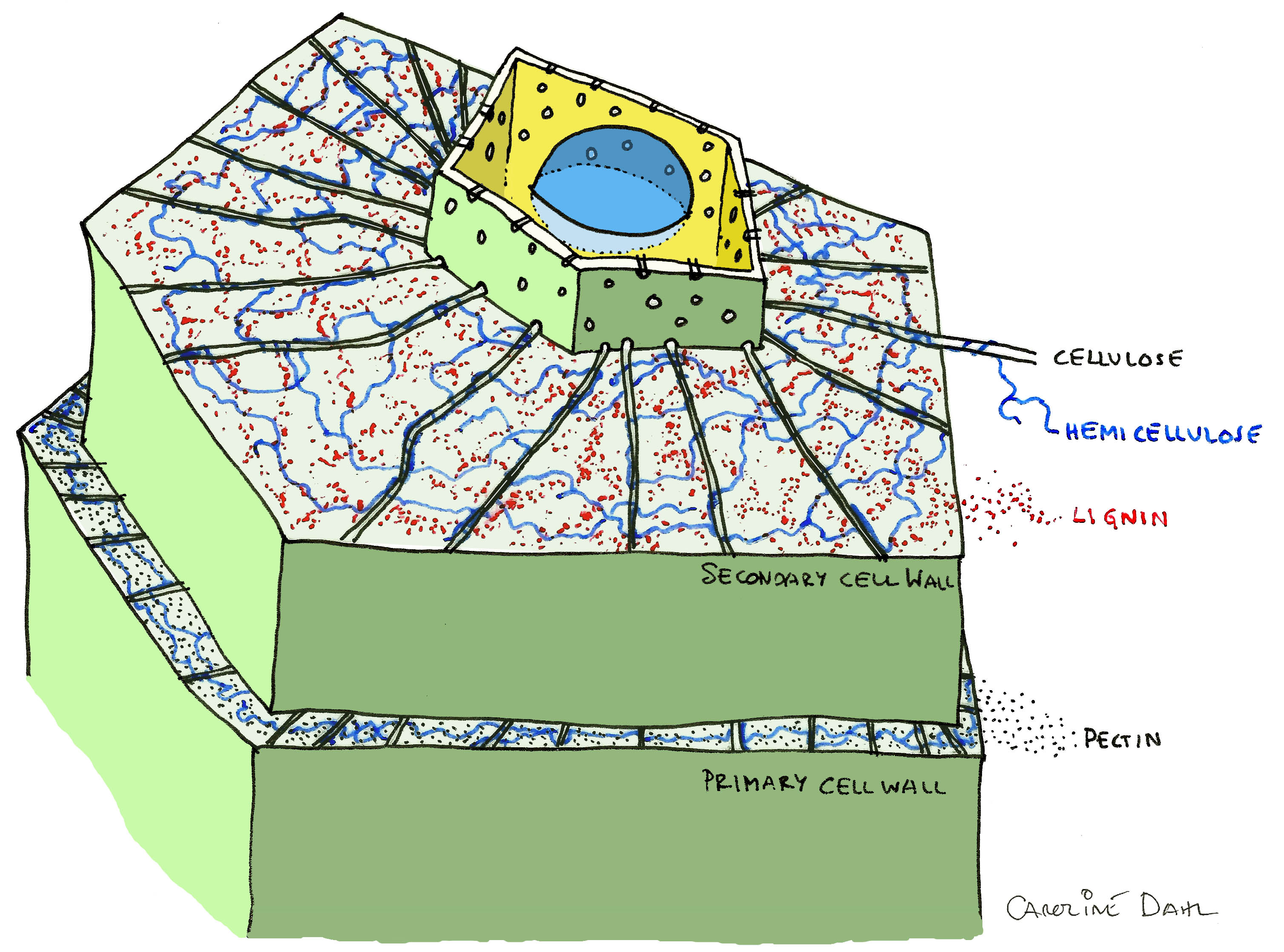
secondary plant wall

- Plant cuticle/surface
- Plant cell walls
- Antimicrobial chemicals (for example: polyphenols, sesquiterpene lactones, saponins)
- Antimicrobial peptides
- Enzyme inhibitors
- Detoxifying enzymes that break down pathogen-derived toxins
- Receptors that perceive pathogen presence and activate inducible plant defences

=== Inducible post-infection plant defenses ===
- Cell wall reinforcement (cellulose, lignin, suberin, callose, cell wall proteins)
- Antimicrobial chemicals, including reactive oxygen species such as hydrogen peroxide or peroxynitrite, or more complex phytoalexins such as genistein or camalexin
- Antimicrobial proteins such as defensins, thionins, or PR-1
- Antimicrobial enzymes such as chitinases, beta-glucanases, or peroxidases
- Hypersensitive response – a rapid host cell death response associated with defence induction.

== Immune system ==
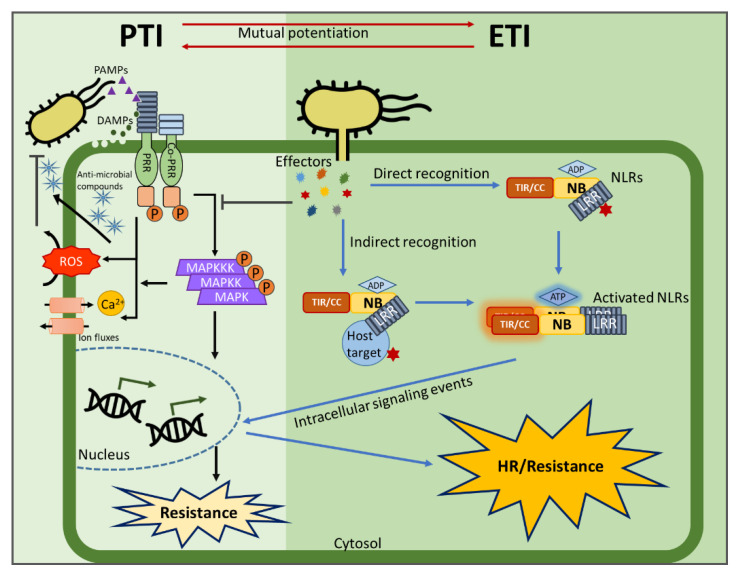
Graphical figure demonstrating multiple studied pathways in PTI and ETI in plant cells to induce pathogen resistance. Potential crossovers in both pathways are also shown.

The plant immune system carries two interconnected tiers of receptors, one most frequently sensing molecules outside the cell and the other most frequently sensing molecules inside the cell. Both systems sense the intruder and respond by activating antimicrobial defenses in the infected cell and neighboring cells. In some cases, defense-activating signals spread to the rest of the plant or even to neighboring plants. The two systems detect different types of pathogen molecules and classes of plant receptor proteins.

The first tier is primarily governed by pattern recognition receptors that are activated by recognition of evolutionarily conserved pathogen or microbial–associated molecular patterns (PAMPs or MAMPs). Activation of PRRs leads to intracellular signaling, transcriptional reprogramming, and biosynthesis of a complex output response that limits colonization. The system is known as PAMP-triggered immunity or as pattern-triggered immunity (PTI).

The second tier, primarily governed by resistant gene products, or R gene products, is often termed effector-triggered immunity (ETI). ETI is typically activated by the presence of specific pathogen "effectors" and then triggers strong antimicrobial responses (see R gene section below).

In addition to PTI and ETI, plant defenses can be activated by the sensing of damage-associated compounds (DAMP), such as portions of the plant cell wall released during pathogenic infection.

Responses activated by PTI and ETI receptors include ion channel gating, oxidative burst, cellular redox changes, or protein kinase cascades that directly activate cellular changes (such as cell wall reinforcement or antimicrobial production), or activate changes in gene expression that then elevate other defensive responses.

Plant immune systems show some mechanistic similarities with the immune systems of insects and mammals, but also exhibit many plant-specific characteristics. The two above-described tiers are central to plant immunity but do not fully describe plant immune systems. In addition, many specific examples of apparent PTI or ETI violate common PTI/ETI definitions, suggesting a need for broadened definitions and/or paradigms. Currently, the term exoToxin-Triggered Immunity (TTI) has been introduced as an exotoxin associated immune response. This is separate to ETI or PTI due to the exotoxin's ability to trigger an immune response in plants alone. This immune pathway was only described in Arabidopsis thaliana, and with a specific exotoxin associated with Pseudomonas syringae (Syringomycin, or SYR), requiring further studies to expand the definition/role in plant immunity. Other papers have shown plant immune responses following various Cyclic Lipopeptides (CLPs) treatment, but have not described the response under a specific immune pathway (ETI, PTI, or TTI).

The term quantitative resistance (discussed below) refers to plant disease resistance that is controlled by multiple genes and multiple molecular mechanisms that each have small effects on the overall resistance trait. Quantitative resistance is often contrasted to ETI resistance mediated by single major-effect R genes.

=== Pattern-triggered immunity ===
PAMPs, conserved molecules that inhabit multiple pathogen genera, are referred to as MAMPs by many researchers. The defenses induced by MAMP perception are sufficient to repel most pathogens. However, pathogen effector proteins (see below) are adapted to suppress basal defenses such as PTI. Many receptors for MAMPs (and DAMPs) have been discovered. MAMPs and DAMPs are often detected by transmembrane receptor-kinases that carry LRR or LysM extracellular domains.

PTI has also been shown to control and suppress portions of the ETI pathway, acting as an immune control element for plant cells.

=== Effector triggered immunity ===
Effector triggered immunity (ETI) is activated by the presence of pathogen effectors. The ETI response is reliant on R genes, in which the effector products produced by pathogens bind to R protein receptors in the cell. Compared to PTI, ETI has a larger response, however, transcriptional regulation is largely conserved between PTI and ETI pathways.

Pathogens use effectors as a way to evade the plant PTI response, however plants can induce both PTI and ETI responses to pathogen invasion, rather than purely independent pathways. Plant ETI often causes an apoptotic hypersensitive response.

=== R genes and R proteins ===
Plants have evolved R genes (resistance genes) whose products mediate resistance to specific virus, bacteria, oomycete, fungus, nematode or insect strains. R gene products are proteins that allow recognition of specific pathogen effectors, either through direct binding or by recognition of the effector's alteration of a host protein. Many R genes encode NB-LRR proteins (proteins with nucleotide-binding and leucine-rich repeat domains, also known as NLR proteins or STAND proteins, among other names). Most plant immune systems carry a repertoire of 100–600 different R gene homologs. Individual R genes have been demonstrated to mediate resistance to specific virus, bacteria, oomycete, fungus, nematode or insect strains. R gene products control a broad set of disease resistance responses whose induction is often sufficient to stop further pathogen growth/spread.

Studied R genes usually confer specificity for particular strains of a pathogen species (those that express the recognized effector). As first noted by Harold Flor in his mid-20th century formulation of the gene-for-gene relationship, a plant R gene has specificity for a pathogen avirulence gene (Avr gene). Avirulence genes are now known to encode effectors. The pathogen Avr gene must have matched specificity with the R gene for that R gene to confer resistance, suggesting a receptor/ligand interaction for Avr and R genes. Alternatively, an effector can modify its host cellular target (or a molecular decoy of that target), and the R gene product (NLR protein) activates defenses when it detects the modified form of the host target or decoy.

=== Effector biology ===
Effectors are central to the pathogenic or symbiotic potential of microbes and microscopic plant-colonizing animals such as nematodes. Effectors typically are proteins that are delivered outside the microbe and into the host cell. These colonist-derived effectors manipulate the host's cell physiology and development. As such, effectors offer examples of co-evolution (example: a fungal protein that functions outside of the fungus but inside of plant cells has evolved to take on plant-specific functions). Pathogen host range is determined, among other things, by the presence of appropriate effectors that allow colonization of a particular host. Pathogen-derived effectors are a powerful tool to identify plant functions that play key roles in disease and in disease resistance. Apparently most effectors function to manipulate host physiology to allow disease to occur. Well-studied bacterial plant pathogens typically express a few dozen effectors, often delivered into the host by a Type III secretion apparatus. Fungal, oomycete and nematode plant pathogens apparently express a few hundred effectors.

So-called "core" effectors are defined operationally by their wide distribution across the population of a particular pathogen and their substantial contribution to pathogen virulence. Genomics can be used to identify core effectors, which can then be used to discover new R gene alleles, which can be used in plant breeding for disease resistance.

=== Small RNAs and RNA interference ===
Plant sRNA pathways are understood to be important components of pathogen-associated molecular pattern (PAMP)-triggered immunity (PTI) and effector-triggered immunity (ETI). Bacteria‐induced microRNAs (miRNAs) in Arabidopsis have been shown to influence hormonal signalling including auxin, abscisic acid (ABA), jasmonic acid (JA) and salicylic acid (SA). Advances in genome‐wide studies revealed a massive adaptation of host miRNA expression patterns after infection by fungal pathogens Fusarium virguliforme, Erysiphe graminis, Verticillium dahliae, and Cronartium quercuum, and the oomycete Phytophthora sojae. Changes to sRNA expression in response to fungal pathogens indicate that gene silencing may be involved in this defense pathway. However, there is also evidence that the antifungal defense response to Colletotrichum spp. infection in maize is not entirely regulated by specific miRNA induction, but may instead act to fine-tune the balance between genetic and metabolic components upon infection.

Transport of sRNAs during infection is likely facilitated by extracellular vesicles (EVs) and multivesicular bodies (MVBs). The composition of RNA in plant EVs has not been fully evaluated, but it is likely that they are, in part, responsible for trafficking RNA. Plants can transport viral RNAs, mRNAs, miRNAs and small interfering RNAs (siRNAs) systemically through the phloem. This process is thought to occur through the plasmodesmata and involves RNA-binding proteins that assist RNA localization in mesophyll cells. Although they have been identified in the phloem with mRNA, there is no determinate evidence that they mediate long-distant transport of RNAs. EVs may therefore contribute to an alternate pathway of RNA loading into the phloem, or could possibly transport RNA through the apoplast. There is also evidence that plant EVs can allow for interspecies transfer of sRNAs by RNA interference such as Host-Induced Gene Silencing (HIGS). The transport of RNA between plants and fungi seems to be bidirectional as sRNAs from the fungal pathogen Botrytis cinerea have been shown to target host defense genes in Arabidopsis and tomato.

=== Species-level resistance ===
In a small number of cases, plant genes are effective against an entire pathogen species, even though that species is pathogenic on other genotypes of that host species. Examples include barley MLO against powdery mildew, wheat Lr34 against leaf rust and wheat Yr36 against wheat stripe rust. An array of mechanisms for this type of resistance may exist depending on the particular gene and plant-pathogen combination. Other reasons for effective plant immunity can include a lack of coadaptation (the pathogen and/or plant lack multiple mechanisms needed for colonization and growth within that host species), or a particularly effective suite of pre-formed defenses.

== Signaling mechanisms ==
=== Perception of pathogen presence ===
Plant defense signaling is activated by the pathogen-detecting receptors that are described in an above section. The activated receptors frequently elicit reactive oxygen and nitric oxide production, calcium, potassium and proton ion fluxes, altered levels of salicylic acid and other hormones and activation of MAP kinases and other specific protein kinases. These events in turn typically lead to the modification of proteins that control gene transcription, and the activation of defense-associated gene expression.

=== Transcription factors and the hormone response ===
Numerous genes and/or proteins as well as other molecules have been identified that mediate plant defense signal transduction. Cytoskeleton and vesicle trafficking dynamics help to orient plant defense responses toward the point of pathogen attack.

==== Mechanisms of transcription factors and hormones ====
Plant immune system activity is regulated in part by signaling hormones such as:

- Salicylic acid
- Jasmonic acid
- Ethylene

There can be substantial cross-talk among these pathways.

=== Regulation by degradation ===
As with many signal transduction pathways, plant gene expression during immune responses can be regulated by degradation. This often occurs when hormone binding to hormone receptors stimulates ubiquitin-associated degradation of repressor proteins that block expression of certain genes. The net result is hormone-activated gene expression. Examples:

- Auxin: binds to receptors that then recruit and degrade repressors of transcriptional activators that stimulate auxin-specific gene expression.
- Jasmonic acid: similar to auxin, except with jasmonate receptors impacting jasmonate-response signaling mediators such as JAZ proteins.
- Gibberellic acid: Gibberellin causes receptor conformational changes and binding and degradation of Della proteins.
- Ethylene: Inhibitory phosphorylation of the EIN2 ethylene response activator is blocked by ethylene binding. When this phosphorylation is reduced, EIN2 protein is cleaved and a portion of the protein moves to the nucleus to activate ethylene-response gene expression.

==== Ubiquitin and E3 signaling ====
Ubiquitination plays a central role in cell signaling that regulates processes including protein degradation and immunological response. Although one of the main functions of ubiquitin is to target proteins for destruction, it is also useful in signaling pathways, hormone release, apoptosis and translocation of materials throughout the cell. Ubiquitination is a component of several immune responses. Without ubiquitin's proper functioning, the invasion of pathogens and other harmful molecules would increase dramatically due to weakened immune defenses.

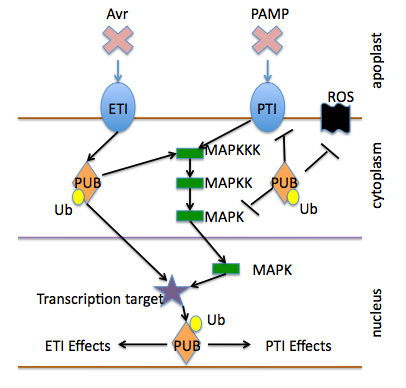
This image depicts the pathways taken during responses in plant immunity. It highlights the role and effect ubiquitin has in regulating the pathway.

===== E3 signaling =====
The E3 ubiquitin ligase enzyme is a main component that provides specificity in protein degradation pathways, including immune signaling pathways. The E3 enzyme components can be grouped by which domains they contain and include several types.

These include the Ring and U-box single subunit, HECT, and CRLs. Plant signaling pathways including immune responses are controlled by several feedback pathways, which often include negative feedback; and they can be regulated by De-ubiquitination enzymes, degradation of transcription factors and the degradation of negative regulators of transcription.

== Quantitative resistance ==
Differences in plant disease resistance are often incremental or quantitative rather than qualitative. The term quantitative resistance (QR) refers to plant disease resistance that is controlled by multiple genes and multiple molecular mechanisms that each have small or minor effects on the overall resistance trait. QR is important in plant breeding because the resulting resistance is often more durable (effective for more years), and more likely to be effective against most or all strains of a particular pathogen. QR is typically effective against one pathogen species or a group of closely related species, rather than being broadly effective against multiple pathogens. QR is often obtained through plant breeding without knowledge of the causal genetic loci or molecular mechanisms. QR is likely to depend on many of the plant immune system components discussed in this article, as well as traits that are unique to certain plant-pathogen pairings (such as sensitivity to certain pathogen effectors), as well as general plant traits such as leaf surface characteristics or root system or plant canopy architecture. The term QR is synonymous with minor gene resistance.

=== Adult plant resistance and seedling resistance ===
Adult plant resistance (APR) is a specialist term referring to quantitative resistance that is not effective in the seedling stage but is effective throughout many remaining plant growth stages. The difference between adult plant resistance and seedling resistance is especially important in annual crops. Seedling resistance is resistance which begins in the seedling stage of plant development and continues throughout its lifetime. When used by specialists, the term does not refer to resistance that is only active during the seedling stage. "Seedling resistance" is meant to be synonymous with major gene resistance or all stage resistance (ASR), and is used as a contrast to "adult plant resistance". Seedling resistance is often mediated by single R genes, but not all R genes encode seedling resistance.

== Plant breeding for disease resistance ==
Plant breeders emphasize selection and development of disease-resistant plant lines. Plant diseases can also be partially controlled by use of pesticides and by cultivation practices such as crop rotation, tillage, planting density, disease-free seeds and cleaning of equipment, but plant varieties with inherent (genetically determined) disease resistance are generally preferred. Breeding for disease resistance began when plants were first domesticated. Breeding efforts continue because pathogen populations are under selection pressure and evolve increased virulence, pathogens move (or are moved) to new areas, changing cultivation practices or climate favor some pathogens and can reduce resistance efficacy, and plant breeding for other traits can disrupt prior resistance. A plant line with acceptable resistance against one pathogen may lack resistance against others.

Breeding for resistance typically includes:

- Identification of plants that may be less desirable in other ways, but which carry a useful disease resistance trait, including wild plant lines that often express enhanced resistance.
- Crossing of a desirable but disease-susceptible variety to a plant that is a source of resistance.
- Growth of breeding candidates in a disease-conducive setting, possibly including pathogen inoculation. Attention must be paid to the specific pathogen isolates, to address variability within a single pathogen species.
- Selection of disease-resistant individuals that retain other desirable traits such as yield, quality and including other disease resistance traits.

Resistance is termed durable if it continues to be effective over multiple years of widespread use as pathogen populations evolve. "Vertical resistance" is specific to certain races or strains of a pathogen species, is often controlled by single R genes and can be less durable. Horizontal or broad-spectrum resistance against an entire pathogen species is often only incompletely effective, but more durable, and is often controlled by many genes that segregate in breeding populations. Durability of resistance is important even when future improved varieties are expected to be on the way: The average time from human recognition of a new fungal disease threat to the release of a resistant crop for that pathogen is at least twelve years.

Crops such as potato, apple, banana, and sugarcane are often propagated by vegetative reproduction to preserve highly desirable plant varieties, because for these species, outcrossing seriously disrupts the preferred traits. See also asexual propagation. Vegetatively propagated crops may be among the best targets for resistance improvement by the biotechnology method of plant transformation to manage genes that affect disease resistance.

Scientific breeding for disease resistance originated with Sir Rowland Biffen, who identified a single recessive gene for resistance to wheat yellow rust. Nearly every crop was then bred to include disease resistance (R) genes, many by introgression from compatible wild relatives.

=== GM or transgenic engineered disease resistance ===
The term GM ("genetically modified") is often used as a synonym of transgenic to refer to plants modified using recombinant DNA technologies. Plants with transgenic/GM disease resistance against insect pests have been extremely successful as commercial products, especially in maize and cotton, and are planted annually on over 20 million hectares in over 20 countries worldwide (see also genetically modified crops). Transgenic plant disease resistance against microbial pathogens was first demonstrated in 1986. Expression of viral coat protein gene sequences conferred virus resistance via small RNAs. This proved to be a widely applicable mechanism for inhibiting viral replication. Combining coat protein genes from three different viruses, scientists developed squash hybrids with field-validated, multiviral resistance. Similar levels of resistance to this variety of viruses had not been achieved by conventional breeding.

A similar strategy was deployed to combat papaya ringspot virus, which by 1994 threatened to destroy Hawaii's papaya industry. Field trials demonstrated excellent efficacy and high fruit quality. By 1998 the first transgenic virus-resistant papaya was approved for sale. Disease resistance has been durable for over 15 years. Transgenic papaya accounts for ~85% of Hawaiian production. The fruit is approved for sale in the U.S., Canada, and Japan.

Potato lines expressing viral replicase sequences that confer resistance to potato leafroll virus were sold under the trade names NewLeaf Y and NewLeaf Plus, and were widely accepted in commercial production in 1999–2001, until McDonald's Corp. decided not to purchase GM potatoes and Monsanto decided to close their NatureMark potato business. NewLeaf Y and NewLeaf Plus potatoes carried two GM traits, as they also expressed Bt-mediated resistance to Colorado potato beetle.

No other crop with engineered disease resistance against microbial pathogens had reached the market by 2013, although more than a dozen were in some state of development and testing.

Examples of transgenic disease resistance projects
Publication year	Crop	Disease resistance	Mechanism	Development status
2012	Tomato	Bacterial spot	R gene from pepper	8 years of field trials
2012	Rice	Bacterial blight and bacterial streak	Engineered E gene	Laboratory
2012	Wheat	Powdery mildew	Overexpressed R gene from wheat	2 years of field trials at time of publication
2011	Apple	Apple scab fungus	Thionin gene from barley	4 years of field trials at time of publication
2011	Potato	Potato virus Y	Pathogen-derived resistance	1 year of field trial at time of publication
2010	Apple	Fire blight	Antibacterial protein from moth	12 years of field trials at time of publication
2010	Tomato	Multibacterial resistance	PRR from Arabidopsis	Laboratory scale
2010	Banana	Xanthomonas wilt	Novel gene from pepper	Now in field trial
2009	Potato	Late blight	R genes from wild relatives	3 years of field trials
2009	Potato	Late blight	R gene from wild relative	2 years of field trials at time of publication
2008	Potato	Late blight	R gene from wild relative	2 years of field trials at time of publication
2008	Plum	Plum pox virus	Pathogen-derived resistance	Regulatory approvals, no commercial sales
2005	Rice	Bacterial streak	R gene from maize	Laboratory
2002	Barley	Stem rust	Resting lymphocyte kinase (RLK) gene from resistant barley cultivar	Laboratory
1997	Papaya	Ring spot virus	Pathogen-derived resistance	Approved and commercially sold since 1998, sold into Japan since 2012
1995	Squash	Three mosaic viruses	Pathogen-derived resistance	Approved and commercially sold since 1994
1993	Potato	Potato virus X	Mammalian interferon-induced enzyme	3 years of field trials at time of publication

==== PRR transfer ====
Research aimed at engineered resistance follows multiple strategies. One is to transfer useful PRRs into species that lack them. Identification of functional PRRs and their transfer to a recipient species that lacks an orthologous receptor could provide a general pathway to additional broadened PRR repertoires. For example, the Arabidopsis PRR EF-Tu receptor (EFR) recognizes the bacterial translation elongation factor EF-Tu. Research performed at Sainsbury Laboratory demonstrated that deployment of EFR into either Nicotiana benthamiana or Solanum lycopersicum (tomato), which cannot recognize EF-Tu, conferred resistance to a wide range of bacterial pathogens. EFR expression in tomato was especially effective against the widespread and devastating soil bacterium Ralstonia solanacearum. Conversely, the tomato PRR Verticillium 1 (Ve1) gene can be transferred from tomato to Arabidopsis, where it confers resistance to race 1 Verticillium isolates.

==== Stacking ====
The second strategy attempts to deploy multiple NLR genes simultaneously, a breeding strategy known as stacking. Cultivars generated by either DNA-assisted molecular breeding or gene transfer will likely display more durable resistance, because pathogens would have to mutate multiple effector genes. DNA sequencing allows researchers to functionally "mine" NLR genes from multiple species/strains.

The avrBs2 effector gene from Xanthomona perforans is the causal agent of bacterial spot disease of pepper and tomato. The first "effector-rationalized" search for a potentially durable R gene followed the finding that avrBs2 is found in most disease-causing Xanthomonas species and is required for pathogen fitness. The Bs2 NLR gene from the wild pepper, Capsicum chacoense, was moved into tomato, where it inhibited pathogen growth. Field trials demonstrated robust resistance without bactericidal chemicals. However, rare strains of Xanthomonas overcame Bs2-mediated resistance in pepper by acquisition of avrBs2 mutations that avoid recognition but retain virulence. Stacking R genes that each recognize a different core effector could delay or prevent adaptation.

More than 50 loci in wheat strains confer disease resistance against wheat stem, leaf and yellow stripe rust pathogens. The Stem rust 35 (Sr35) NLR gene, cloned from a diploid relative of cultivated wheat, Triticum monococcum, provides resistance to wheat rust isolate Ug99. Similarly, Sr33, from the wheat relative Aegilops tauschii, encodes a wheat ortholog to barley Mla powdery mildew–resistance genes. Both genes are unusual in wheat and its relatives. Combined with the Sr2 gene that acts additively with at least Sr33, they could provide durable disease resistance to Ug99 and its derivatives.

==== Executor genes ====
Another class of plant disease resistance genes opens a "trap door" that quickly kills invaded cells, stopping pathogen proliferation. Xanthomonas and Ralstonia transcription activator–like (TAL) effectors are DNA-binding proteins that activate host gene expression to enhance pathogen virulence. Both the rice and pepper lineages independently evolved TAL-effector binding sites that instead act as an executioner that induces hypersensitive host cell death when up-regulated. Xa27 from rice and Bs3 and Bs4c from pepper, are such "executor" (or "executioner") genes that encode non-homologous plant proteins of unknown function. Executor genes are expressed only in the presence of a specific TAL effector.

Engineered executor genes were demonstrated by successfully redesigning the pepper Bs3 promoter to contain two additional binding sites for TAL effectors from disparate pathogen strains. Subsequently, an engineered executor gene was deployed in rice by adding five TAL effector binding sites to the Xa27 promoter. The synthetic Xa27 construct conferred resistance against Xanthomonas bacterial blight and bacterial leaf streak species.

==== Host susceptibility alleles ====
Most plant pathogens reprogram host gene expression patterns to directly benefit the pathogen. Reprogrammed genes required for pathogen survival and proliferation can be thought of as "disease-susceptibility genes." Recessive resistance genes are disease-susceptibility candidates. For example, a mutation disabled an Arabidopsis gene encoding pectate lyase (involved in cell wall degradation), conferring resistance to the powdery mildew pathogen Golovinomyces cichoracearum. Similarly, the Barley MLO gene and spontaneously mutated pea and tomato MLO orthologs also confer powdery mildew resistance.

Lr34 is a gene that provides partial resistance to leaf and yellow rusts and powdery mildew in wheat. Lr34 encodes an adenosine triphosphate (ATP)–binding cassette (ABC) transporter. The dominant allele that provides disease resistance was recently found in cultivated wheat (not in wild strains) and, like MLO, provides broad-spectrum resistance in barley.

Natural alleles of host translation elongation initiation factors eif4e and eif4g are also recessive viral-resistance genes. Some have been deployed to control potyviruses in barley, rice, tomato, pepper, pea, lettuce, and melon. The discovery prompted a successful mutant screen for chemically induced eif4e alleles in tomato.

Natural promoter variation can lead to the evolution of recessive disease-resistance alleles. For example, the recessive resistance gene xa13 in rice is an allele of Os-8N3. Os-8N3 is transcriptionally activated byXanthomonas oryzae pv. oryzae strains that express the TAL effector PthXo1. The xa13 gene has a mutated effector-binding element in its promoter that eliminates PthXo1 binding and renders these lines resistant to strains that rely on PthXo1. This finding also demonstrated that Os-8N3 is required for susceptibility.

Xa13/Os-8N3 is required for pollen development, showing that such mutant alleles can be problematic should the disease-susceptibility phenotype alter function in other processes. However, mutations in the Os11N3 (OsSWEET14) TAL effector–binding element were made by fusing TAL effectors to nucleases (TALENs). Genome-edited rice plants with altered Os11N3 binding sites remained resistant to Xanthomonas oryzae pv. oryzae, but still provided normal development function.

==== Gene silencing ====
RNA silencing-based resistance is a powerful tool for engineering resistant crops. The advantage of RNAi as a novel gene therapy against fungal, viral, and bacterial infection in plants lies in the fact that it regulates gene expression via messenger RNA degradation, translation repression and chromatin remodelling through small non-coding RNAs. Mechanistically, the silencing processes are guided by processing products of the double-stranded RNA (dsRNA) trigger, which are known as small interfering RNAs and microRNAs.

Temperature Effects on Virus Resistance

Temperature significantly affects plant resistance to viruses. For example, plants with the N gene for tobacco develop tolerance to tobacco mosaic virus (TMV) but become systemically infected at temperatures above 28 °C. Similarly, Capsicum chinense plants carrying the Tsw gene can become systemically infected with Tomato spotted wilt virus (TSWV) at 32 °C. In the case of Beet necrotic yellow vein virus (BNYVV), plants expressing the BvGLYR1 gene showed higher virus accumulation at 22 °C compared to 30 °C, indicating that temperature influences the effectiveness of this gene in virus resistance.

== Host range ==
Among the thousands of species of plant pathogenic microorganisms, only a small minority have the capacity to infect a broad range of plant species. Most pathogens instead exhibit a high degree of host-specificity. Non-host plant species are often said to express non-host resistance. The term host resistance is used when a pathogen species can be pathogenic on the host species but certain strains of that plant species resist certain strains of the pathogen species. The causes of host resistance and non-host resistance can overlap. Pathogen host range is determined, among other things, by the presence of appropriate effectors that allow colonization of a particular host. Pathogen host range can change quite suddenly if, for example, the pathogen's capacity to synthesize a host-specific toxin or effector is gained by gene shuffling/mutation, or by horizontal gene transfer.

== Epidemics and population biology ==
Native populations are often characterized by substantial genotype diversity and dispersed populations (growth in a mixture with many other plant species). They also have undergone of plant-pathogen coevolution. Hence as long as novel pathogens are not introduced/do not evolve, such populations generally exhibit only a low incidence of severe disease epidemics.

Monocrop agricultural systems provide an ideal environment for pathogen evolution, because they offer a high density of target specimens with similar/identical genotypes. The rise in mobility stemming from modern transportation systems provides pathogens with access to more potential targets. Climate change can alter the viable geographic range of pathogen species and cause some diseases to become a problem in areas where the disease was previously less important.

These factors make modern agriculture more prone to disease epidemics. Common solutions include constant breeding for disease resistance, use of pesticides, use of border inspections and plant import restrictions, maintenance of significant genetic diversity within the crop gene pool (see crop diversity), and constant surveillance to accelerate initiation of appropriate responses. Some pathogen species have much greater capacity to overcome plant disease resistance than others, often because of their ability to evolve rapidly and to disperse broadly.

== Case Study of American Chestnut Blight ==
Chestnut blight was first noticed in American Chestnut trees that were growing in what is now known as the Bronx Zoo in the year 1904. For years following this incident, it was argued as to what the identity of the pathogen was, as well as the appropriate approach to its control. The earliest attempts to fix the problem on the chestnut involved chemical solutions or physical ones. They attempted to use fungicides, cut limbs off of trees to stop the infection, and completely remove infected trees from habitations to not allow them to infect the others. All of these strategies ended up unsuccessful. Even quarantine measures were put into place which were helped by the passage of Plant Quarantine Act. Chestnut blight still proved to be a huge problem as it rapidly moved through the densely populated forests of chestnut trees. In 1914, the idea was considered to induce blight resistance to the trees through various different means and breeding mechanisms.

== See also ==
- Gene-for-gene relationship
- Induced systemic resistance
- Plant defense against herbivory
- Plant pathology
- Plant use of endophytic fungi in defense
- Systemic acquired resistance
