= Puccinia coronata f.sp. avenae =

Scientific classification
- Kingdom: Fungi
- Division: Basidiomycota
- Class: Pucciniomycetes
- Order: Pucciniales
- Family: Pucciniaceae
- Genus: Puccinia
- Species: P. coronata
- Forma specialis: P. c. f.sp. avenae

Trionomial name
- Puccinia coronata f.sp. avenae P. Syd. & Syd.

Variation of the crown rust fungus

Puccinia coronata f.sp. avenae is the variation (forma specialis, f.sp.) of the crown rust fungus (Puccinia coronata) which infects oat plants (Avena sativa). Almost every growing region of oat has been affected by this pathogen at one point or another. During particularly bad epidemics, the worldwide crop yields have been reduced by up to 40%. One reason why Pca has such a prominent effect is that the conditions which favor oat production also favor the growth and inoculation of the rusts: Meaning that years in which the highest yields of crops are expected are the same years in which losses are the highest as well. Pca urediniospores germinate the best at temperature between 10–30 °C (50–86 °F) with germ-tube growth optimized at 20 °C (68 °F).

The virulence of Pca and the resistance of wild oat plants is a highly studied topic. It seems that the resistance level of the oat plant is dependent upon which race of Pca is acting on it; the virulence of the fungal pathogen also seems to depend upon which strain the strain of oat being attacked. There are most likely multiple traits that control both virulence and resistance which suggests a very interactive host-parasite coevolution. A few specific loci have been found to confer resistance such as Pca which conferred a dominant, resistant phenotype to nine different isolates of P. coronata. An additional isolate of P. coronata was also resisted, although another, un-linked gene may be involved which correlates the theory that resistance and virulence in A. sativa are controlled by multiple genes. Some studies suggest that the responses are dependent upon the physiological race of the rust involved due to mutations that arise in separate races.

One way in which the expression of certain genes has been found to combat Pca is through the production of avenalumins. Avenalumins are antimicrobial compounds which inhibit hyphal growth, thus preventing P. coronata from spreading. Avenalumins are only found in infected areas of plants and nowhere else. The production of avenalumins is regulated by some of the same genes that have been found to confer resistance in certain lines of oats, thus indicating their importance in resistance. In addition to total resistance to specific races, in such cases as the production avenalumins, partial or horizontal resistance provides a way to reduce the effect of P. coronata.
