= Raoul A. Robinson =

Canadian plant scientist

Raoul A. Robinson (September 25, 1928 in Saint Helier, Jersey - 25 July 2014) was a Canadian/British plant scientist with more than forty years of wide-ranging global experience in crop improvement for both commercial and subsistence agriculture. He is best known for his application of system theory to crop pathosystems and the elucidation of the concepts of horizontal and vertical resistance and their implication on breeding for durable resistance.

== Education ==
He was educated at Victoria College, Jersey, and graduated from the University of Reading in 1951.

== Career ==
Over the course of his adventurous and productive career, Robinson concentrated most intensively on maize, potatoes, beans, and coffee. In addition, he has worked with cotton, tomatoes, dates, wheat, alfalfa, cocoa, cassava, coconut, tobacco, taro, sweet potato, vanilla, black pepper, and other crops.

== Books ==
- Robinson, R.A. (1987). Plant Pathosystems. Springer-Verlag, Berlin, Heidelberg, New York. 184pp.
- ——————— (1987). Host Management in Crop Pathosystems. Macmillan, New York (now McGraw-Hill), Collier-Macmillan, London. 263pp.
- ——————— (2004). Amateur Plant Breeder's Handbook 2004. Sharebooks. ISBN 0-9731816-2-1.
- ———————. Amateur Potato Breeder's Manual. Sharebooks.
- ———————. Crop Histories. Sharebooks. ISBN 0-9731816-4-8.
- ———————. Farming And Us: The Influence of Agriculture on Human Behaviour. Sharebooks. ISBN 0-9731816-1-3.
- ———————. Return to Resistance: Breeding Crops to Reduce Pesticide Dependency. Sharebooks. ISBN 0-9731816-0-5.
- ———————. Self-Organising Agro-Ecosystems. Sharebooks. ISBN 0-9731816-3-X.

== Articles ==
- Roberto, Garcia; Raoul A. Robinson; J. Alejandro Aguilar-P; Sergio Sandoval; Remigio Guzman (2003). "Recurrent selection for quantitative resistance to soil-borne diseases in beans in the Mixteca region, Mexcico". Euphytica. 130 (2): 241–247. doi:10.1023/A:1022824708377.
- Robinson, R.A. (1969). "Disease resistance terminology". Rev. Appl. Mycol. 48: 593–606.
- Robinson, R.A. (1971). "Vertical resistance". Rev. Plant. Pathol. 50: 233–239.
- Robinson, R.A. (1973). "Potato development. Rept. to the Govt. of Kenya". TA3208, FAO, Rome. 30pp.
- Robinson, R.A. (1973). "Horizontal resistance". Rev. Appl. Mycol. 52: 483–501.
- Robinson, R.A. (1974). "Terminal report of the FAO Coffee Pathologist to the Government of Ethiopia". FAO, Rome, AGO/74/443. 16pp.
- Robinson, R.A. (1979). "Permanent and impermanent resistance to crop parasites: A re-examination of the pathosystem concept with special reference to rice blast". Z. Pflanzenzuchtg. 83: 1–39.
- Robinson, R.A. (1982). "Theoretical resistance models". Durable Resistance in Crops. Plenum Press, New York and London. pp. 45–55.
- Robinson, R.A. (1982). "Pathosystem management". Durable Resistance in Crops. Plenum Press, New York and London. pp. 237–247.
- Robinson, R.A.; L. Chiarappa (1997). "Host resistance to crop parasites". Integrated Pest Management Reviews. 2 (3): 103–107. doi:10.1023/A:1018492732432.
- Robinson, R.A.; L. Chiarappa (1977). "The international program on horizontal resistance". FAO plant protection bulletin. 25: 197–200.
- Robinson, R.A.; A.H. Ramos (1964). "Bacterial wilt of potatoes in Kenya". E. Afric. Agric. For. J. 30: 59–64.
