= Pathosystem =

A pathosystem is a subsystem of an ecosystem and is defined by the phenomenon of parasitism. A plant pathosystem is one in which the host species is a plant. The parasite is any species in which the individual spends a significant part of its lifespan inhabiting one host individual and obtaining nutrients from it. The parasite may thus be an insect, mite, nematode, parasitic Angiosperm, fungus, bacterium, mycoplasma, virus or viroid. Other consumers, however, such as mammalian and avian herbivores, which graze populations of plants, are normally considered to be outside the conceptual boundaries of the plant pathosystem.

A host has the property of resistance to a parasite. And a parasite has the property of parasitic ability on a host. Parasitism is the interaction of these two properties. The main feature of the pathosystem concept is that it concerns parasitism, and it is not concerned with the study of either the host or parasite on its own. Another feature of the pathosystem concept is that the parasitism is studied in terms of populations, at the higher levels and in ecologic aspects of the system. The pathosystem concept is also multidisciplinary. It brings together various crop science disciplines such as entomology, nematology, plant pathology, and plant breeding. It also applies to wild populations and to agricultural, horticultural, and forest crops, and to tropical, subtropical, as well as both subsistence and commercial farming.

In a wild plant pathosystem, both the host and the parasite populations exhibit genetic diversity and genetic flexibility. Conversely, in a crop pathosystem, the host population normally exhibits genetic uniformity and genetic inflexibility (i.e., clones, pure lines, hybrid varieties), and the parasite population assumes a comparable uniformity. This distinction means that a wild pathosystem can respond to selection pressures, but that a crop pathosystem does not. It also means that a system of locking (see below) can function in a wild plant pathosystem but not in a crop pathosystem.

Pathosystem balance means that the parasite does not endanger the survival of the host; and that the resistance in the host does not endanger the survival of the parasite. This is self-evident from the evolutionary survival of wild plant pathosystems, as systems, during periods of geological time.

The gene-for-gene relationship is an approximate botanical equivalent of antigens and antibodies in mammals. For each resistance gene in the host, there is a corresponding, or matching, gene in the parasite. When the genes of the parasite match those of the host, the resistance does not operate.

There are two kinds of resistance to parasites in plants:

- Vertical resistance involves a gene-for-gene relationship. This kind of resistance is genetically controlled by single genes, although several such genes may be present in a single host or parasite individual. Vertical resistance is ephemeral resistance because it operates against some strains of the parasite but not others, depending on whether or not a match occurs. In agriculture, vertical resistance requires pedigree breeding and back-crossing. It has been the resistance of choice during the twentieth century.
- Horizontal resistance does not involve a gene-for-gene relationship. It is the resistance that invariably remains after vertical resistance has been matched. It is genetically controlled by polygenes and it is durable resistance as many ancient clones testify. Its use in agriculture requires population breeding and recurrent mass selection.

Infection is the contact made by one parasite individual with one host individual for the purposes of parasitism. There are two kinds of infection:

- Allo-infection means that the parasite originates away from its host and has to travel to that host. The first infection of any individual host must be an allo-infection. Vertical resistance can control allo-infection only. It normally does this with a system of locking (see below) which reduces the proportion of allo-infections that are matching infections.
- Auto-infection means that the parasite originates on, or in, the host that it is infecting. Auto-infection and all the consequences of a matching allo-infection, can be controlled only by horizontal resistance. This is because the parasite individual reproduces asexually to produce a clone (or else reproduces sexually and quickly reaches homogeneity of matching individuals) and auto-infection is thus matching infection.

An epidemic is the growth of a parasite population which is made at the expense of the host population. There are two kinds of epidemic:

- Continuous epidemics have no break in the parasitism; they have no gene-for-gene relationships; they involve evergreen trees, and some perennial herbs.
- Discontinuous epidemics have regular breaks in the parasitism, due to an absence of host tissue during an adverse season, such as a temperate winter or tropical dry season; they often have a gene-for-gene relationship against some of their parasites; they involve annual plants, some perennial herbs, and the leaves and fruits of deciduous trees and shrubs.

== Gene-for-gene relationship - the n/2 model ==
The n/2 model (pronounced either ‘en over two’ or 'half en') suggests the mode of operation of the gene-for-gene relationship in a wild plant pathosystem. It apparently functions as a system of locking in which every host and parasite individual has half of the genes in the gene-for-gene relationship (i.e., n/2 genes, where n is the total number of pairs of genes in that relationship). Each gene in the host is the equivalent of a tumbler in a mechanical lock, and each gene in the parasite is the equivalent of a notch on a mechanical key. Provided that each n/2 combination of genes occurs with an equal frequency, and with a random distribution, in both the host and parasite populations, the frequency of matching allo-infections will be reduced to the minimum. For example, with six pairs of genes, each host and parasite individual would have three genes, and there would be twenty different locks and keys; with a twelve-gene system, there would be 924 six-gene locks and keys. Given an equal frequency and a random distribution of every lock and key, the frequency of matching allo-infection would be 1/20 and 1/924, respectively. These figures are obtained from the binomial expansion illustrated by Pascal's triangle.

This system of locking cannot function in a crop pathosystem in which the host population has genetic uniformity. A crop pathosystem is usually the equivalent of every door in the town having the same lock, and every householder having the same key which fits every lock. A system of locking is ruined by uniformity, and this is exactly what we have achieved when protecting our genetically uniform crops with vertical resistance. It also explains why vertical resistance is temporary resistance in agriculture. This type of error is called sub-optimization and it results from working at too low a systems level. The system of locking is an emergent property that is observable only at the systems level of the pathosystem. Comparable biological emergents are the schooling of fish, and the flocking of birds, which cannot be observed at any systems level below that of the population. The n/2 model is also the most important hypothesis to emanate from the concept of the pathosystem. It can also be argued that the gene-for-gene relationship must function on a basis of heterogeneity in the wild pathosystem because the gross instability of the 'boom and bust' of modern plant breeding would have no evolutionary survival value.

A gene-for-gene relationship can evolve only in a discontinuous pathosystem. This is because it functions as a system of locking. A matching allo-infection is the equivalent of a lock being unlocked. With the end of the season, all matched (i.e., unlocked) host tissues disappear. With the onset of a new growing season, all discontinuous host tissue (e.g., new leaves of a deciduous tree, newly germinated annual seedlings, or newly emerged tissue of a perennial herb) is unmatched and each host individual has a vertical resistance that is functioning. This is the equivalent of re-locking. This alternation of matching and non-matching (or unlocking and re-locking) is an essential feature of any system of locking, and it is possible only in a discontinuous pathosystem. Conversely, in a continuous pathosystem just one matching allo-infection on each host individual is required for that individual to be parasitised for the rest of its life which, in the case of some evergreen trees, may endure for centuries. A gene-for-gene relationship is useless in such a pathosystem and, consequently, it will not evolve.

Crops that are derived from a continuous wild pathosystem (e.g., aroids, banana, cassava, citrus, cocoa, coconut, date palm, ginger, mango, oil palm, olive, papaya, pineapple, pyrethrum, sisal, sugarcane, sweet potato, tea, turmeric, vanilla, yams) have no gene-for-gene relationships, not withstanding a few erroneous reports to the contrary.

== Horizontal resistance ==
Horizontal resistance is the resistance that invariably remains after a matching allo-infection has occurred. To postulate that horizontal resistance does not occur would be to postulate an absolute susceptibility. Such a level of susceptibility is experimentally unproved, and is theoretically impossible. Horizontal resistance is polygenically inherited and it can be exhibited at any level between its minimum and its maximum. Its maximum level should provide a virtually complete control of a parasite under conditions of maximum epidemiological competence. Breeding for comprehensive horizontal resistance will require simultaneous quantitative improvements and will eventually control all the parasites that have epidemiological competence in a particular agro-ecosystem. (5). However, because epidemiological competence is so variable, a cultivar that is in balance with one agro-ecosystem, is likely to be unbalanced in another agro-ecosystem, having too much resistance to some parasites and too little to others.

Of particular importance is the concept of parasite interference, first defined by Vanderplank, who called it the cryptic error in field trials. Parasite interference does not affect the demonstration of vertical resistance, but it can totally destroy the evidence for high levels of horizontal resistance. This factor, which has only recently been recognised, largely explains the almost total neglect of horizontal resistance during the twentieth century.

The greater the area of a uniform host population with a single vertical resistance, the more dangerous that resistance becomes. This is because of an increased selection pressure for the matching parasite, and an increased loss when the matching does occur. The greater the area of uniformity of vertical resistance, therefore, the greater the danger. Conversely, the greater the area of a uniform host population with high horizontal resistances, the more effective the horizontal resistance becomes. This is because parasite interference declines as the area of a horizontally resistant host population increases, and it is least when the entire crop of a region has a high level of horizontal resistance in all of its cultivars. The greater the area of uniformity of horizontal resistance, therefore, the greater the security.

In breeding crop plants for horizontal resistance to their parasites, the disciplines of plant breeding, plant pathology, and crop entomology should be regarded as being amalgamated into a single discipline.
