= Clayton Oscar Person =

Canadian scientist (1922–1990)

Clayton Oscar Person, CM FRSC (May 16, 1922 – September 1, 1990) was recognized internationally as an authority on the genetics of host-parasite relations. He was born and raised in Aylesbury, Saskatchewan, Canada and died in Vancouver, British Columbia, Canada. His writings have made a major contribution to the development of a rigorous theoretical basis for our understanding of how the genetic structure of parasitic populations interacts with that of their host populations. This was known as the gene-for-gene relationship. His theoretical methods have been applied widely in the practical management of parasitic diseases in agriculture and forestry.

== Biography ==
=== Education ===
After service overseas in the Royal Canadian Navy from 1941-1945, he returned to enroll at the University of Saskatchewan where he was awarded Honours in Biology in 1950 and the MA in 1951. He studied for the Ph.D. at the University of Alberta, then spent two post-doctoral years abroad — one at the University of Lund, Sweden and another at the John Innes Institute in England.

=== Career ===
Dr. Person was employed for several years (1956-1961) as Research Officer with Agriculture Canada in its Dominion Rust Research Laboratory, Winnipeg. He was then appointed as the first Head of the Department of Genetics at the University of Alberta. In 1966 he joined the Department of Botany of the University of British Columbia. Dr. Person has served the Canadian scientific community in various capacities, including participation in the establishment of the Genetics Society of Canada and later as its president; as Chairman of the NSERC Committee for Plant Biology, and as a member of the Canadian National Committee for the International Union of Biological Science. His scholarly achievements have received wide recognition.

He has been an Invited participant in numerous international symposia. In 1971 he was a visiting professor at Punjab Agricultural University. In 1975 he served as consultant to the FAO (United Nations) on coffee diseases in Ethiopia. He was an invited scholar at the Rockefeller Study and Conference Centre in Italy in 1982. Dr. Person is an acknowledged authority on the genetics of plant parasites. His major research contribution has been to clarify the genetic basis of microevolutionary change in host-parasite systems. His work constitutes a major contribution to modern theory of host-parasite interaction in plant populations. It has found important applications in plant breeding throughout the world.

== Awards and recognitions ==
He was elected Fellow of the Royal Society of Canada in 1970, and was designated Fellow of the American Phytopathological Society in 1981. He was awarded the British Columbia Science Secretariat Medal in 1981, the Flavelle Medal by the Royal Society of Canada and the Medal of the Genetics Society of Canada, both in 1982. He was made a Member of the Order of Canada in 1986. In 1987 the Canadian Botanical Association awarded him the George Lawson Medal.

== Publications ==
- Person, Clayton Oscar (1959). "Gene-for-gene relationships in parasitic systems". Canadian Journal of Botany. 37 (5). Canadian Science Publishing: 1101–1130. doi:10.1139/b59-087.
  - Cited by Roane 1973
- Person, Clayton Oscar; Sidhu, G. (1970-10-12). Genetics of host-parasite interrelationships. Panel on mutation breeding for disease resistance. Panel proceedings series. Vienna: IAEA & UN FAO (published 1971). pp. 31–38. INIS RN:2011909.
  - Also cited by Roane 1973
- Person, Clayton Oscar; Groth, J. V.; Mylyk, O. M. (1976). "Genetic Change in Host-Parasite Populations". Annual Review of Phytopathology. 14 (1). Annual Reviews: 177–188. Bibcode:1976AnRvP..14..177P. doi:10.1146/annurev.py.14.090176.001141. ISSN 0066-4286. S2CID 86139317.
