= R gene =

Genes in plant genomes

Leucine-rich repeat receptor-like protein kinase

Identifiers
- Symbol: LRRK
- Membranome: 737

Leucine-rich repeat receptor-like protein

Identifiers
- Symbol: LRRP
- Membranome: 605

TIR-NBS-LRR disease resistance proteins

Identifiers
- Symbol: TIR-NBS-LRR
- Membranome: 1343

TIR domain plant proteins

Identifiers
- Symbol: TIRP
- Membranome: 1344

Resistance genes (R-genes) are genes in plant genomes that convey plant disease resistance against pathogens by producing R proteins. The main class of R-genes consist of a nucleotide binding domain (NB) and a leucine rich repeat (LRR) domain(s) and are often referred to as (NB-LRR) R-genes or NLRs. Generally, the NB domain binds either ATP/ADP or GTP/GDP. The LRR domain is often involved in protein-protein interactions as well as ligand binding. NB-LRR R-genes can be further subdivided into toll interleukin 1 receptor (TIR-NB-LRR) and coiled-coil (CC-NB-LRR).

Resistance can be conveyed through a number of mechanisms including:

- The R protein interacts directly with an Avr gene product of a pathogen (see Gene-for-gene relationship).
- The R protein guards another protein that detects degradation by an Avr gene (see guard hypothesis).
- The R protein may detect a pathogen-associated molecular pattern or PAMP (alternatively called MAMP for microbe-associated molecular pattern).
- The R protein encodes enzyme that degrades a toxin produced by a pathogen.

Once the R protein has detected the presence of a pathogen, the plant can mount a defence against the pathogen. Because R genes confer resistance against specific pathogens, it is possible to transfer an R gene from one plant to another and make a plant resistant to a particular pathogen.

Many plant resistance proteins are single-pass transmembrane proteins that belong to receptor kinases and toll-like receptors. R genes are of large interest in crop breeding, providing a large part of the immunity required by agricultural pathosystems.

== Background ==
Plant defense mechanisms depend on detection of fungal and bacterial pathogens. R proteins are a way of identifying the pathogen effectors and stopping the infection. Molecules essential for pathogen defense are pattern recognition receptors (PRRs), wall associated kinase (WAKs), receptors with nucleotide-binding domain (NLRs) and leucine-rich repeats (LRRs). All these R proteins play roles in detecting and recognizing pathogen effectors, initiating multiple signal transductions inside the plant cell, these signals transductions will lead to different responses that will aid in pathogen destruction and prevention of further infection. These responses are:

- Production of reactive oxygen (ROS)
- Hypersensitive response
- Closure of the stomata
- Production of different chemical compounds (terpenes, phenolic, tannins, alkaloids, phytoalexins)

Note that plants have various mechanisms to prevent and detect pathogenic infections, but factors such as geography, environment, genetic, and timing can affect the recognition pattern of a pathogen or can have an effect on the recognition of avirulent (avr) pathogens in plants.

== Pathogen recognition ==
R genes synthesize proteins that will aid with the recognition of pathogenic effectors:

=== Pattern recognition receptors (PRRs) ===
This receptor is often composed of leucine-rich repeats (LRRs). LRRs have a wide range of bacterial (proteins), fungal (carbohydrates) and virulent (nucleic acids) recognition, this means that LRRs recognizes many different molecules but each LRRs usually has a very specific molecule it detects. The ability of PRRs to recognize various pathogenic components relies on a regulatory protein called brassinosteroid insensitive 1 –associated receptor kinase (BAK1). Once the pathogen has been recognized by PRRs the release of a kinase into the nucleus has been transduced triggering a transcriptional reprogramming.

=== Wall-associated kinase (WAKs) ===
The plant cell wall is conformed of pectin and other molecules. Pectin has abundant galacturonic acids which is the compound that WAKs recognizes after a foreign invasion in the plant. Every WAK (WAK1 and WAK2) has an N-terminal which interacts with pectin in the cell wall when pectin is being degraded to galacturonic acids by fungal enzymes.

Pathogen-associated molecular pattern (PAMPs) and damage-associated molecular pattern (DAMPs) are often identified by lectins which is a protein that binds specific carbohydrates.

=== Nucleotide-binding domain and leucine-rich repeats (NLRs) ===
Most R genes code for these immune receptor proteins. NLRs shifts its conformation from ADP state to and ATP state which allows it to send as signal transduction. The activation of NLRs is yet to be completely understood, according to current studies suggest that it is subject to multiple regulators (dimerization or oligomerization, epigenetic and transcriptional regulation, alternative splicing, and proteasome-mediated regulation)

Despite all these differences NLRs, PRRs, WAKs, effector trigger immunity (ETI) and PAMP-triggered immunity (PTI) there are certain similarities such as in the mechanism of signal transduction which includes mitogen-protein kinase (MAPK) cascades through phosphorylation which will be, calcium ion signaling.

An overall overview about the mechanical interaction about a plant defense and the ability of a pathogen to infect a plant would be for instance such a common interaction between bacterial flagellin and receptor-like kinase which triggers a basal immunity sending signals through MAP kinase cascades and transcriptional reprogramming mediated by plant WRKY transcription factors (Stephen T). Also plant resistance protein recognize bacterial effectors and programs resistance through ETI responses.

=== Various other types ===
The EDS1 family is a family of plant disease resistance proteins including the nominate enhanced disease susceptibility 1/EDS1 itself and phytoalexin deficient 4/PAD4. The best studied examples of EDS1 and PAD4 are the Arabidopsis thaliana § EDS1 family members.

== Signal transduction ==
A plant defense has two different types of immune system, the one that recognizes pathogen/microbes associated molecular patterns (PAMPs), and this is also known as PAMP-triggered immunity (PTI). Plant defense mechanism depends on immune receptors found on the plasma membrane and then the mechanism can sense the pathogen associated molecular patterns (PAMPs) and microbial associated molecular patterns (MAMPs). Detection of PAMPs triggers a physiological change in the cell activated by the pattern recognition receptors (PRRs) initiating a cascade response which through the recognition of PAMPs and MAMPs lead to the plant resistance. The other type of defense is also known as effector-triggered immunity (ETI) which is the second type of defense mediated by R-proteins by detecting photogenic effectors. ETI detects pathogenic factors and initiates a defense response. ETI is a much faster and amplified system than PTI and it develops onto the hypersensitive response (HR) leading the infected host cell to apoptosis. This does not terminate the pathogen cycle, it just slows the cycle down.

Plants have many ways of identifying symbiotic or foreign pathogens; one of these receptors causes fluctuations in the calcium ions and this fluctuation in the calcium ions. A transcription factor plays an important role in defenses against pathogenic invasion.

== Pathogen invasion ==
Despite the sophiscation of plant defenses, some pathogens have evolved ways to overcome these defenses in order to infect and spread.

Pathogen elicitors are molecules that stimulate any plant defense; among these elicitors we can find two types of pathogen derived elicitors, pathogen/microbe associated molecular pattern (PAMPs/MAMPs), and also there is a second type which is produced by plants known as damage or danger associated molecular patterns (DAMPs). PTI is a way of responding against pathogen actions happening outside the cell, but a much stronger response like ETI is generated in response to effectors molecules. Once there is an induced resistance also known as priming, the plant can react faster and stronger to a pathogen attack. A known priming inducer is called β-aminobutyric acid (BABA) which is a non-protein amino acid.

Successful pathogens evolve changes in their chemical conformation in order to avoid detection by PRRs and WAKs.

Some viruses have mechanisms that allow them to avoid or suppress the RNA-mediated defense (RMD) that some viruses induce in non-transgenic plants. Further studies have shown that this suppression of the host defense has been done by HC-protease (HCPro) encoded in the Potyviral genome. It was later stablished that HCPro was a mechanism used to suppress post-transcriptional gene slicing (PTGs). Cucumber mosaic virus (CMV) uses a different protein called 2b (Pfam PF03263) which is also a suppressor of PTGS in Nicotiana benthamiana.

Even though HcPro and the 2b protein have different protein sequence specific to their own virus, both target the same instrument of defense through different mechanisms.

== Genetic engineering ==
R genes are common subjects of gene cloning. Every advance in techniques of sequencing and transfer has eased this process, requiring less linkage drag, expense, and laboratory work over time. In the future, better results are expected from larger data sets, across bigger numbers of individuals and populations, with greater resolution due to both more accurate sequencing and post-sequencing computational comparison between individuals.

== See also ==
- Pattern recognition receptor
- Pathogenesis-related proteins, unrelated groups of diverse pathogen resistance proteins
