= Genetic sequencing =

Genetic Sequencing may refer to:

- DNA sequencing
- Whole genome sequencing
