= Gene-for-gene relationship =

Concept in plant genetics

The gene-for-gene relationship is a concept in plant pathology that plants and their diseases each have single genes that interact with each other during an infection. It was proposed by Harold Henry Flor who was working with rust (Melampsora lini) of flax (Linum usitatissimum). Flor showed that the inheritance of both resistance in the host and parasite ability to cause disease is controlled by pairs of matching genes. One is a plant gene called the resistance (R) gene. The other is a parasite gene called the avirulence (Avr) gene. Plants producing a specific R gene product are resistant towards a pathogen that produces the corresponding Avr gene product. Gene-for-gene relationships are a widespread and very important aspect of plant disease resistance. Another example can be seen with Lactuca serriola versus Bremia lactucae.

Clayton Oscar Person was the first scientist to study plant pathosystem ratios rather than genetics ratios in host-parasite systems. In doing so, he discovered the differential interaction that is common to all gene-for-gene relationships and that is now known as the Person differential interaction.

== Resistance genes ==
=== Classes of resistance gene ===
There are several different classes of R genes. The major classes are the NBS-LRR genes and the cell surface pattern recognition receptors (PRR). The protein products of the NBS-LRR R genes contain a nucleotide binding site (NBS) and a leucine rich repeat (LRR). The protein products of the PRRs contain extracellular, juxtamembrane, transmembrane and intracellular non-RD kinase domains.

Within the NBS-LRR class of R genes are two subclasses:

- One subclass has an amino-terminal Toll/Interleukin 1 receptor homology region (TIR). This includes the N resistance gene of tobacco against tobacco mosaic virus (TMV).
- The other subclass does not contain a TIR and instead has a leucine zipper region at its amino terminal.

The protein products encoded by this class of resistance gene are located within the plant cell cytoplasm.

The PRR class of R genes includes the rice XA21 resistance gene that recognizes the ax21 peptide and the Arabidopsis FLS2 peptide that recognizes the flg22 peptide from flagellin.

There are other classes of R genes, such as the extracellular LRR class of R genes; examples include rice Xa21D for resistance against Xanthomonas and the cf genes of tomato that confer resistance against Cladosporium fulvum.

The Pseudomonas tomato resistance gene (Pto) belongs to a class of its own. It encodes a Ser/Thr kinase but has no LRR. It requires the presence of a linked NBS-LRR gene, prf, for activity.

=== Specificity of resistance genes ===
R gene specificity (recognising certain Avr gene products) is believed to be conferred by the leucine rich repeats. LRRs are multiple, serial repeats of a motif of roughly 24 amino acids in length, with leucines or other hydrophobic residues at regular intervals. Some may also contain regularly spaced prolines and arginines.

LRRs are involved in protein-protein interactions, and the greatest variation amongst resistance genes occurs in the LRR domain. LRR swapping experiments between resistance genes in flax rust resulted in the specificity of the resistance gene for the avirulence gene changing.

=== Recessive resistance genes ===
Most resistance genes are autosomal dominant but there are some, most notably the mlo gene in barley, in which monogenic resistance is conferred by recessive alleles. mlo protects barley against nearly all pathovars of powdery mildew.

== Avirulence genes ==
The term "avirulence gene" remains useful as a broad term that indicates a gene that encodes any determinant of the specificity of the interaction with the host. Thus, this term can encompass some conserved microbial signatures, also called pathogen or microbe associated molecular patterns (PAMPs or MAMPs), and pathogen effectors (e.g. bacterial type III effectors and oomycete effectors) as well as any genes that control variation in the activity of those molecules.

Intracellular recognition of an avirulence gene product was first demonstrated by Gopalan et al. 1996. They found that artificial expression of Pseudomonas syringae's avrB in the host Arabidopsis produced cell death when combined with expression of the host R gene, RPM1. This proved recognition was occurring intracellularly and not on the surface.

There is no common structure between avirulence gene products. Because there would be no evolutionary advantage to a pathogen keeping a protein that only serves to have it recognised by the plant, it is believed that the products of Avr genes play an important role in virulence in genetically susceptible hosts.

Example: AvrPto is a small triple-helix protein that, like several other effectors, is targeted to the plasma membrane by N-myristoylation. AvrPto is an inhibitor of PRR kinase domains. PRRs signal plants to induce immunity when PAMPs are detected. The ability to target receptor kinases is required for the virulence function of AvrPto in plants. However, Pto is a resistant gene that can detect AvrPto and induce immunity as well. AvrPto is an ancient effector that is conserved in many P. syringae strains, whereas Pto R gene is only found in a few wild tomato species. This suggests recent evolution of the Pto R gene and the pressure to evolve to target AvrPto, turning a virulence effector to an avirulence effector.

Unlike the MAMP or PAMP class of avr genes that are recognized by the host PRRs, the targets of bacterial effector avr proteins appear to be proteins involved in plant innate immunity signaling, as homologues of Avr genes in animal pathogens have been shown to do this. For example, the AvrBs3 family of proteins possess DNA binding domains, nuclear localisation signals and acidic activation domains and are believed to function by altering host cell transcription.

== Guard hypothesis ==
In only some cases is there direct interaction between the R gene product and the Avr gene product. For example, both FLS2 and XA21 interact with the microbial peptides. In contrast, for the NBS-LRR class of R genes, direct interaction has not been shown for most of the R/avr pairs. This lack of evidence for a direct interaction led to the formation of the guard hypothesis for the NBS-LRR class of R genes.

This model proposes that the R proteins interact, or guard, a protein known as the guardee which is the target of the Avr protein. When it detects interference with the guardee protein, it activates resistance.

Several experiments support this hypothesis, e.g. the Rpm1 gene in Arabidopsis thaliana is able to respond to two completely unrelated avirulence factors from Pseudomonas syringae. The guardee protein is RIN4, which is hyperphosphorylated by the Avr proteins. Another high profile study that supports the guard hypothesis shows that the RPS5 pair uses PBS1, a protein kinase, as a guardee against AvrPphB.

Yeast two-hybrid studies of the tomato Pto/Prf/AvrPto interaction showed that the Avirulence protein, AvrPto, interacted directly with Pto despite Pto not having an LRR. This makes Pto the guardee protein, which is protected by the NBS-LRR protein Prf. However, Pto is a resistance gene alone, which is an argument against the guard hypothesis.

== See also ==
- Horizontal resistance
- Gene-for-gene interactions in rust fungi
