= HMA domain =

Heavy-metal-associated domain
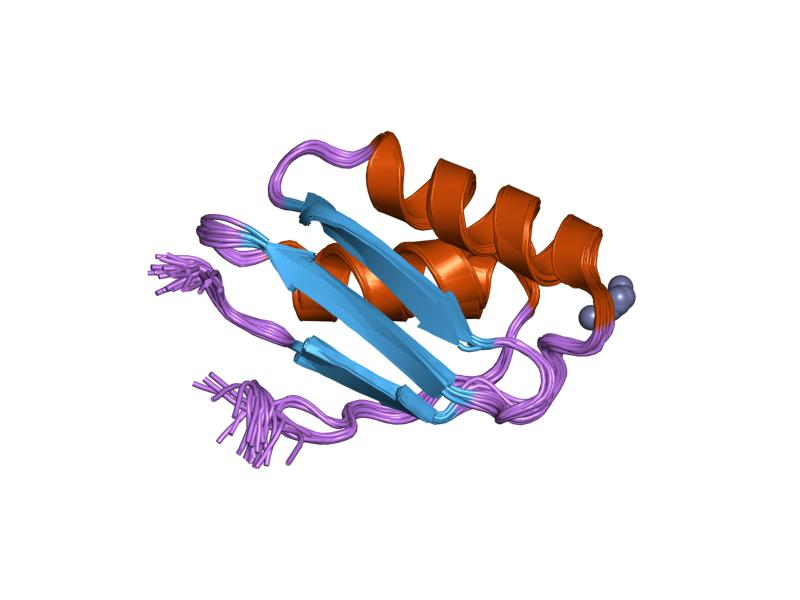
- solution structure of the n-terminal domain of znta in the zn(ii)-form

Identifiers
- Symbol: HMA
- Pfam: PF00403
- InterPro: IPR006121
- PROSITE: PDOC00804
- SCOP2: 2hqi / SCOPe / SUPFAM
- TCDB: 9.A.2
Available protein structures:
- Pfam: structures / ECOD
- PDB: RCSB PDB; PDBe; PDBj
- PDBsum: structure summary

In molecular biology, the HMA domain (heavy-metal-associated domain) is a conserved protein domain found in a number of heavy metal transport or detoxification proteins.

Proteins that transport heavy metals in micro-organisms and mammals share similarities in their sequences and structures. These proteins provide an important focus for research, some being involved in bacterial resistance to toxic metals, such as lead and cadmium, while others are involved in inherited human syndromes, such as Wilson's and Menke's diseases.

The HMA domain, contains two conserved cysteines that are probably involved in metal binding. The fourth HMA domain of the Menke's copper transporting ATPase shows a well-defined structure comprising a four-stranded antiparallel beta-sheet and two alpha helices packed in an alpha-beta sandwich fold. This fold is common to other domains and is classified as "ferredoxin-like".
