= Guard theory =

Guard theory is a branch of immunology which concerns the innate sensing of stereotypical consequences of a virulence factor or pathogen. This is in contrast to the classical understanding of recognition by the innate immune system, which involves recognition of distinct microbial structures- pathogen-associated molecular patterns (PAMPs)- with pattern recognition receptors (PRRs). Some of these stereotypical consequences of virulence factors and pathogens may include altered endosomal trafficking and changes in the cytoskeleton. These recognition mechanisms would work to complement classical pattern recognition mechanisms.

== Mechanism ==
=== In plants ===
In plants, guard theory is also known as indirect recognition. This is because rather than direct recognition of a virulence factor or pathogen, there is instead recognition of the result of a process mediated by a virulence factor or pathogen. In these cases, the virulence factor appears to target an accessory protein that is either a target or a structural mimic of the target of that virulence factor, allowing for plant defences to respond to a specific strategy of pathogenesis rather structures that may evolve and change over time at a faster rate than the plant can adapt to. The interaction between pathogen and accessory protein results in some modification of the accessory protein, which allows for recognition by plant NBS-LRR proteins, which monitor for infection. This model is best illustrated by RIN4 protein in A. thaliana. RIN4 forms a complex with the NB-LRR proteins RPM1 and RPS2. Protease effector AvrRpt2 is able to degrade RIN4, causing de-repression of RPS2. On the other hand, AvrB or AvrRPM1-mediated phosphorylation of RIN4 results in activation of RPM1. In short, this example elucidates how one NBS-LRR protein is able to recognize the effects of more than one virulence factor or effector.

== Guard defences in humans and relationship with allergies ==
Little is known concerning guard receptors in humans. One example currently under speculation involves recognition of cysteine proteases secreted by helminths during infection. It has been speculated that some allergies develop as a result of structural similarities between the allergen and high-activity cysteine proteases secreted by helminths during their infectious cycle. One proposed mechanism by which this may take place is that proteases secreted by the helminths cleave proteins which act as detectors, and these detectors in turn activate sensors to alert the immune system.
