= Effector-triggered immunity =

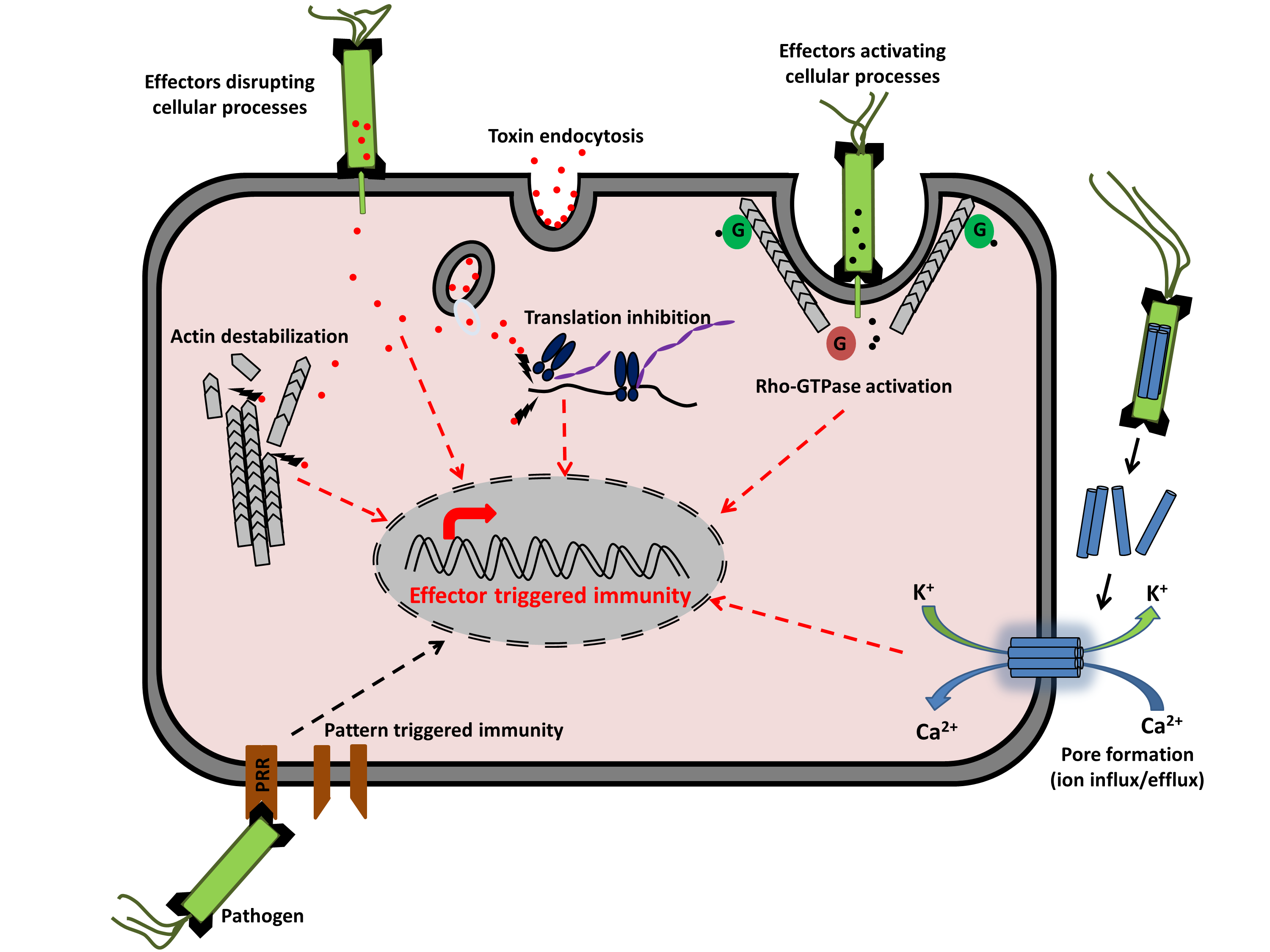
The host cell detects the presence of the pathogen directly from the molecular patterns on the pathogen and indirectly through the damage caused to the host cell by the toxins generated by the pathogen.

Effector-triggered immunity (ETI) is one of the pathways, along with the pattern-triggered immunity (PTI) pathway, by which the innate immune system recognises pathogenic organisms and elicits a protective immune response. ETI is elicited when an effector protein secreted by a pathogen into the host cell is successfully recognised by the host. Alternatively, effector-triggered susceptibility (ETS) can occur if an effector protein can block the immune response triggered by pattern recognition receptors (PRR) and evade immunity, allowing the pathogen to propagate in the host.

ETI was first identified in plants but has also been identified in animal cells. The basis of the ETI model lies in the gene-for-gene resistance hypothesis proposed by Harold Henry Flor in 1942. Flor proposed that plants may express resistance (R) proteins that recognise avirulence (Avr) proteins from pathogens, thus making them resistant to pathogen invasion. His hypothesis has since been confirmed by identifying multiple Avr-R gene pairs. Some Avr proteins are direct ligands for receptors encoded by the R genes, such as the Leu-rich repeat receptors (LRRs). Other Avr proteins, called effectors, act to modify host proteins and those modifications are sensed by R proteins on the host plant side to initiate effector-triggered immunity.
