= Pycniospore =

Type of fungal spores

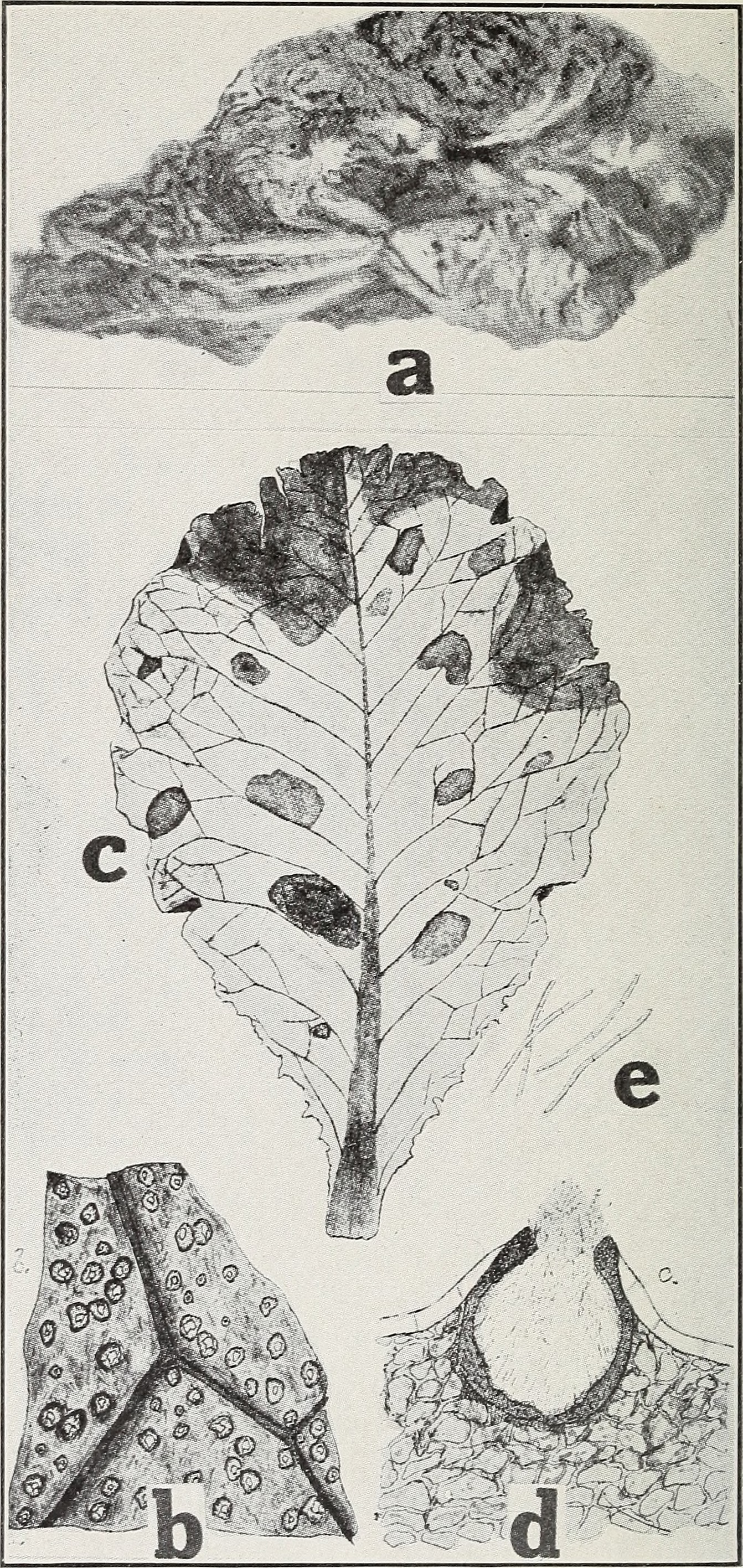
Lettuce Diseases. a. Drop, h. Septoria leaf spot, c. same as b. but older spots, d. pycnida, e. pycniospores

Pycniospores are a type of spore found in certain species of rust fungi. They are produced in special cup-like structures called pycnia or pynidia. Almost all fungi reproduce asexually with the production of spores. Spores may be colorless, green, yellow, orange, red, brown or black.

== Other types of spore ==
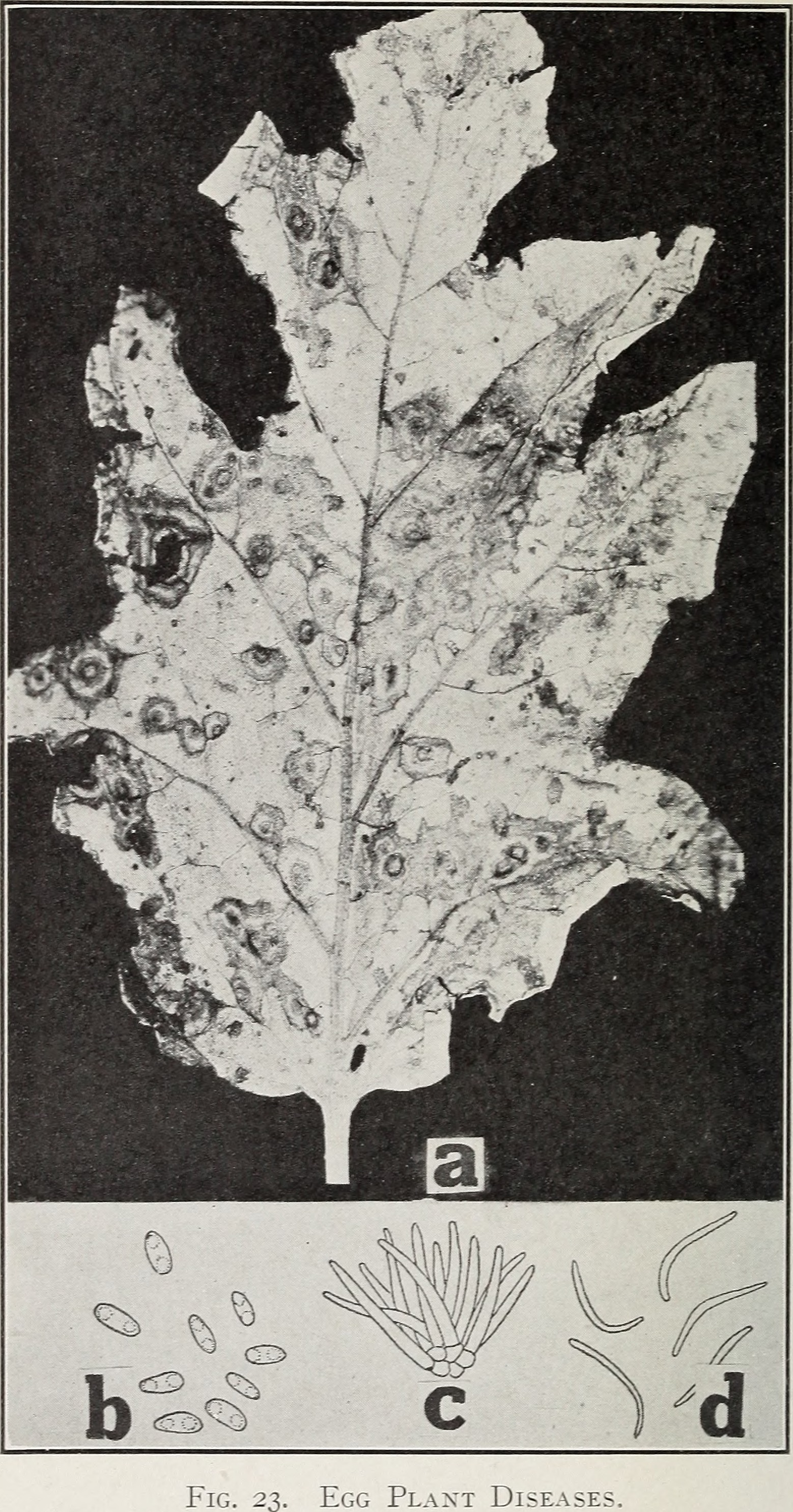
a. Phomosis spot on eggplant leaf, b. pycniospores, c. conidiophores, d. stylospores

Sporangiospores

Sporangiospores (spore:spore, angion:sac) are spores formed inside the sporangium which is a spore sac.

Conidia

Conidia (singular: conidium) are spores produced at the tip of special branches called conidiophores.

Oidia

Oidia (singular: oidium). In several fungi, the hyphae is often divided into a large number of short pieces by transverse walls. Each piece is able to germinate into a new body. These pieces are called oidia (small egg).

Chlamydospores

Chlamydospores (chlymus: mantle) are produced like oidia but differ from oidia in being thick walled. They are either terminal or intercalary.
