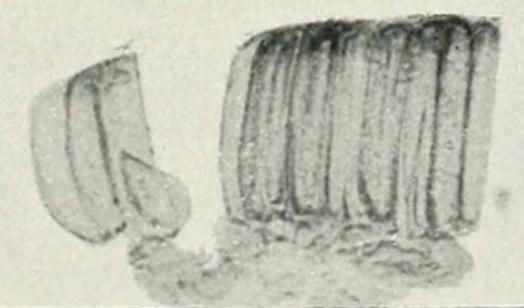
- Teleutospores of Melampsora lini closely attached to each other, on Linum usitatissimum

Scientific classification
- Kingdom: Fungi
- Division: Basidiomycota
- Class: Pucciniomycetes
- Order: Pucciniales
- Family: Melampsoraceae
- Genus: Melampsora
- Species: M. lini

Binomial name
- Melampsora lini (Ehrenb.) Lév., (1847)

Synonyms
- Lecythea lini Berk., (1860); Melampsora lini (Ehrenb.) Lév., (1847); Uredo lini DC., (1805); Xyloma lini Ehrenb., (1818)

= Melampsora lini =

Species of fungus

Melampsora lini is a species of fungus and plant pathogen found in Ireland and commonly known as flax rust.

== Life cycle ==
The pathogen is an obligate biotroph meaning that each stage of its cycle is dependent on having a living host. The direction between reproducing sexually or asexually is dependent on the availability of a host.

Sexually, the life cycle starts when basidiospores land on flax leaves and form pycnium during December and through January. Aecium are then formed from the pycnium after being fertilized with a pycniospore that is of a different mating type. Urediniospores and aeciospores then form pustules on the leaves that release more spores leading to further infection on neighboring leaves. Teliospores are then formed on the plants stem and undergo meiosis. Afterward, the teliospores shed haploid basidiospores repeating the cycle.

Asexually, the pathogen cycles between forming pustules and infecting surrounding leaves and plants. The pathogen is autoecious, meaning it completes its life cycle on a single plant. This is done purely through mitosis and produces genetically identical cells within the pustules.

== Hosts ==
Linum catharticum has been recorded as a host for Melampsora lini in Iceland and Radiola linoides has been recorded as a host for Melampsora lini in the UK.

The pathogen prefers an environment in the temperate plains or hills of the United Kingdom rather than in high altitude and cold conditions. Due to this, there is a higher prevalence of resistance seen in hosts in these more favorable environment compared to hosts seen in mountainous ranges. This is primarily due to the fact that there is a higher evolutionary pressure placed on these plants. Those that can defend against the pathogen go on to reproduce and pass on the genes responsible for their immunity.

- Flax
- Linseed
- Wheat

== Symptoms and signs ==
Signs and symptoms of flax rust include:

=== Signs ===
- Light yellow to orange-yellow sori
- Reddish-yellow to orange uredinia on leaves
- Brown to black telia

All signs are uniform for the hosts of the pathogen stated before. The only difference is the amount of signs seen due to the varying leaf shapes of the plants.

=== Symptoms ===
- Yellowing of leaves
- Necrotic leaf spots

Symptoms are uniform for the hosts of the stated above. There is some variation in the amount of symptoms seen because of the amount of available host area infected by the pathogen.

== Research ==
The pathogen itself is not known for being detrimental to farmers since it does not take away from the total yield. During the 1990s, the pathogen was used as a role model for the molecular basis of plant immunity. The majority of research worked on observing the pathogenicity of a variety of physiological races of the pathogen and the resistance and susceptibility of the "gene-for-gene" relationship and understanding the breakdown of resistance when using a single gene. This led to the use of incorporating multiple resistance genes to ensure resistance persisted.

From the late 1980s to present, the focus of research shifted to more specific molecular studies. One major discovery included the cytoplasmic nucleotide-binding leucine-rich repeat proteins. These proteins help provide resistance against fungi, oomycetes, bacteria, viruses, nematodes, insects, and parasitic plants. This was found through observing point mutations, re-assortment of mutation, and duplication and deletion of LRR units done by intragenic recombination in Australia in 2007.
