= Vertical resistance =

The term vertical resistance, used commonly in the context of plant selection, was first used in 1963 by James Edward Van der Plank to describe single-gene resistance. This contrasted with the term horizontal resistance which was used to describe many-gene resistance.

In 1976, Raoul A. Robinson adapted the original definition of vertical resistance and argued that in vertical resistance there were individual genes for resistance in the host plant and also individual genes for parasitic ability in the parasite. This phenomenon is known as the gene-for-gene relationship, and it was the defining character of vertical resistance.
