= Harold Henry Flor =

American phytopathologist (1900–1991)

Harold Henry Flor

Harold Henry Flor known as H. H. Flor (1900–1991) was an American plant pathologist famous for proposing the gene for gene hypothesis of plant-pathogen genetic interaction whilst working on rust (Melampsora lini) of flax (Linum usitatissimum).

== Life and career ==
Harold Henry Flor completed his B.S. at the University of Minnesota in 1922, and continued on to an M.S. degree there for the following two years. He received his M.S. degree in June 1924 for his research work entitled ''Control of covered smuts of small grains''. Between January 1924 and May 1925 he worked at Iowa State College as a Research Fellow and completed his work on the ''Fungicidal activity of furfural'' there. For a year between September 1925 to September 1926 he worked as a Research Fellow at the graduate school of the University of Minnesota, following which he completed a research work on root rot in sugarcane supervised by E.G. Edgerton at the State University of Louisiana. His collective research at these three institutions earned him a PhD degree awarded by the University of Minnesota in June 1929.

Between 1929 and 1931, H.H. Flor worked at the US Department of Agriculture at Washington State University, where he cultivated his interest in genetics. In 1931 he moved to North Dakota Agricultural College, where he proposed the term "Avirulence gene". He remained there for the rest of his career, until retiring in 1969.
