= Horizontal resistance =

In genetics, the term horizontal resistance was first used by J. E. Vanderplank to describe many-gene resistance, which is sometimes also called generalized resistance. This contrasts with the term vertical resistance which was used to describe single-gene resistance. Raoul A. Robinson further refined the definition of horizontal resistance. Unlike vertical resistance and parasitic ability, horizontal resistance and horizontal parasitic ability are entirely independent of each other in genetic terms.

Successive rounds of breeding for horizontal resistance proceed in a more traditional fashion, selecting plants for disease resistance as measured by yield. These plants are exposed to native regional pathogens, and given minimal assistance in fighting them.
