= Aeroplankton =

Tiny lifeforms floating and drifting in the air, carried by the wind

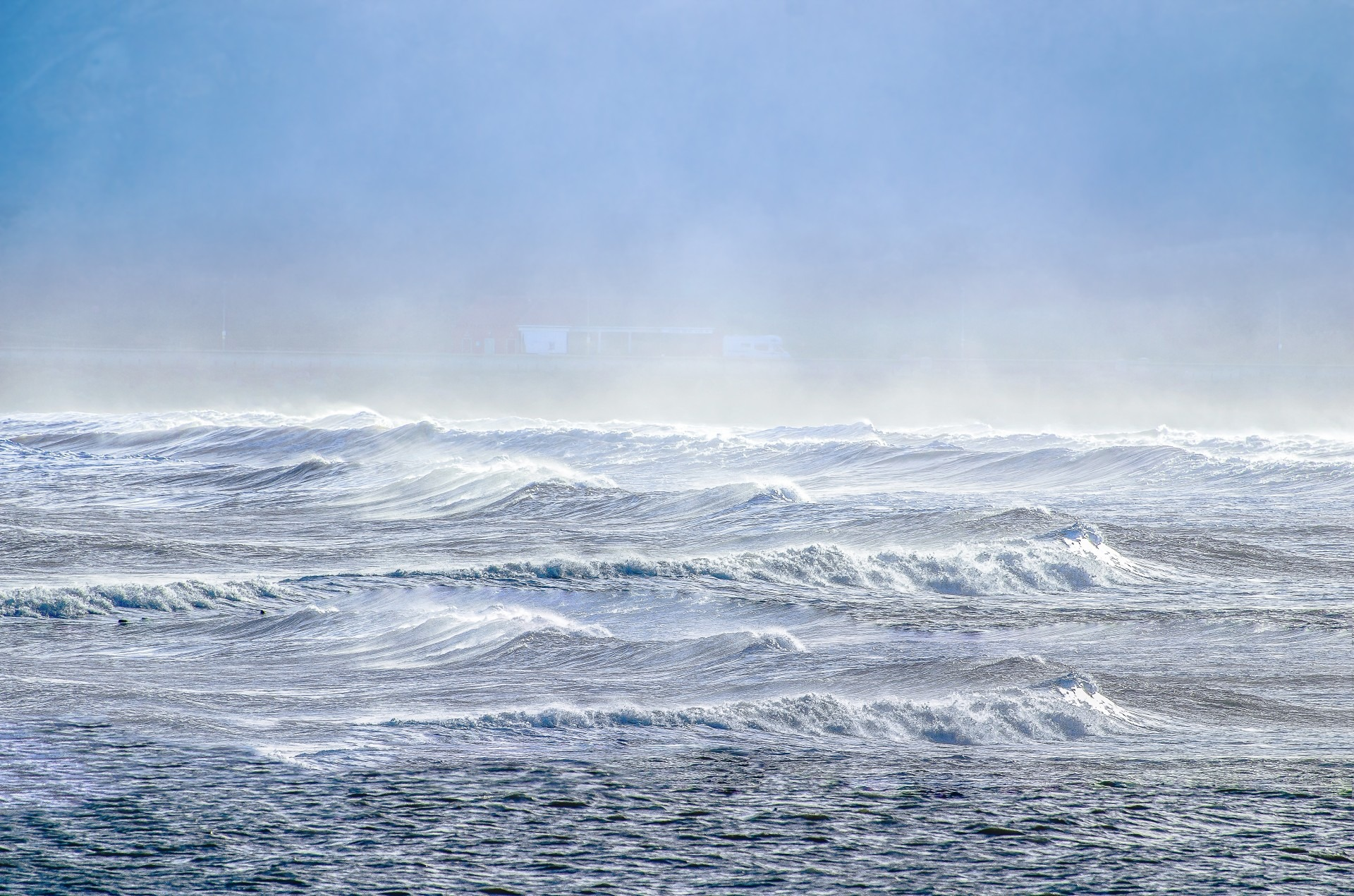
Sea spray containing marine microorganisms can be swept high into the atmosphere and may travel the globe before falling back to earth.

Aeroplankton (or aerial plankton) are tiny lifeforms that float and drift in the air, carried by wind. Most of the living things that make up aeroplankton are very small to microscopic in size, and many can be difficult to identify because of their tiny size. Scientists collect them for study in traps and sweep nets from aircraft, kites or balloons. The study of the dispersion of these particles is called aerobiology.

Aeroplankton is made up mostly of microorganisms, including viruses, about 1,000 different species of bacteria, around 40,000 varieties of fungi, and hundreds of species of protists, algae, mosses, and liverworts that live some part of their life cycle as aeroplankton, often as spores, pollen, and wind-scattered seeds. Additionally, microorganisms are swept into the air from terrestrial dust storms, and an even larger amount of airborne marine microorganisms are propelled high into the atmosphere in sea spray. Aeroplankton deposits hundreds of millions of airborne viruses and tens of millions of bacteria every day on every square meter around the planet.

Small, drifting aeroplankton are found everywhere in the atmosphere, reaching concentration up to 10^{6} microbial cells per cubic metre. Processes such as aerosolization and wind transport determine how the microorganisms are distributed in the atmosphere. Air mass circulation globally disperses vast numbers of the floating aerial organisms, which travel across and between continents, creating biogeographic patterns by surviving and settling in remote environments. As well as the colonization of pristine environments, the globetrotting behaviour of these organisms has human health consequences. Airborne microorganisms are also involved in cloud formation and precipitation, and play important roles in the formation of the phyllosphere, a vast terrestrial habitat involved in nutrient cycling.

== Overview ==
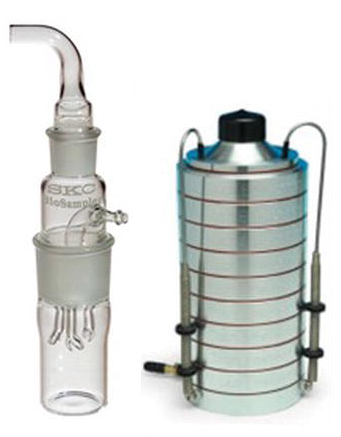
Sampling airborne microorganisms Left: Impinger sampling of bioaerosols Right: Six-stage Andersen cascade impactor

The atmosphere is the least understood biome on Earth despite its critical role as a microbial transport medium. Recent studies have shown microorganisms are ubiquitous in the atmosphere and reach concentration up to 10^{6} microbial cells per cubic metre (28,000/cu ft) and that they might be metabolically active. Different processes, such as aerosolisation, might be important in selecting which microorganisms exist in the atmosphere. Another process, microbial transport in the atmosphere, is critical for understanding the role microorganisms play in meteorology, atmospheric chemistry and public health.

Changes in species geographic distributions can have strong ecological and socioeconomic consequences. In the case of microorganisms, air mass circulation disperses vast amounts of individuals and interconnects remote environments. Airborne microorganisms can travel between continents, survive and settle on remote environments, which creates biogeographic patterns. The circulation of atmospheric microorganisms results in global health concerns and ecological processes such as widespread dispersal of both pathogens and antibiotic resistances, cloud formation and precipitation, and colonization of pristine environments. Airborne microorganisms also play a role in the formation of the phyllosphere, which is one of the vastest habitats on the Earth's surface involved in nutrient cycling.

The field of bioaerosol research studies the taxonomy and community composition of airborne microbial organisms, also referred to as the air microbiome. A recent series of technological and analytical advancements include high-volumetric air samplers, an ultra-low biomass processing pipeline, low-input DNA sequencing libraries, as well as high-throughput sequencing technologies. Applied in unison, these methods have enabled comprehensive and meaningful characterization of the airborne microbial organismal dynamics found in the near-surface atmosphere. Airborne microbial organisms also impact agricultural productivity, as bacterial and fungal species distributed by air movement act as plant blights. Furthermore, atmospheric processes, such as cloud condensation and ice nucleation events were shown to depend on airborne microbial particles. Therefore, understanding the dynamics of microbial organisms in air is crucial for insights into the atmosphere as an ecosystem, but also will inform on human wellbeing and respiratory health.

In recent years, next generation DNA sequencing technologies, such as metabarcoding as well as coordinated metagenomics and metatranscriptomics studies, have been providing new insights into microbial ecosystem functioning, and the relationships that microorganisms maintain with their environment. There have been studies in soils, the ocean, the human gut, and elsewhere.

In the atmosphere, though, microbial gene expression and metabolic functioning remain largely unexplored, in part due to low biomass and sampling difficulties. So far, metagenomics has confirmed high fungal, bacterial, and viral biodiversity, and targeted genomics and transcriptomics towards ribosomal genes has supported earlier findings about the maintenance of metabolic activity in aerosols and in clouds. In atmospheric chambers airborne bacteria have been consistently demonstrated to react to the presence of a carbon substrate by regulating ribosomal gene expressions.

== Types ==
=== Pollen grains ===
Effective pollen dispersal is vital for maintenance of genetic diversity and fundamental for connectivity between spatially separated populations. An efficient transfer of the pollen guarantees successful reproduction in flowering plants. No matter how pollen is dispersed, the male-female recognition is possible by mutual contact of stigma and pollen surfaces. Cytochemical reactions are responsible for pollen binding to a specific stigma.

Allergic diseases are considered to be one of the most important contemporary public health problems affecting up to 15–35% of humans worldwide. There is a body of evidence suggesting that allergic reactions induced by pollen are on the increase, particularly in highly industrial countries.

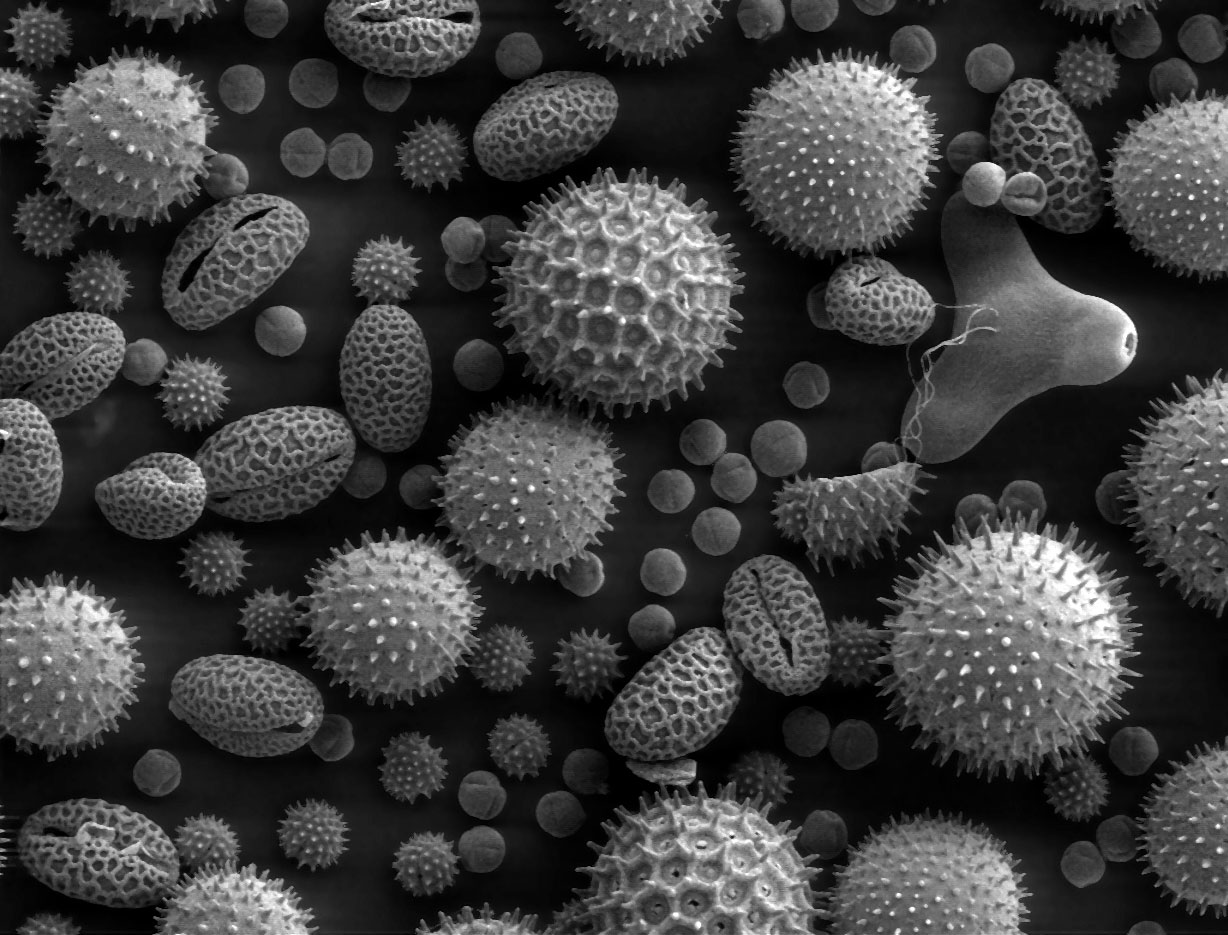
SEM image of pollen grains from common plants

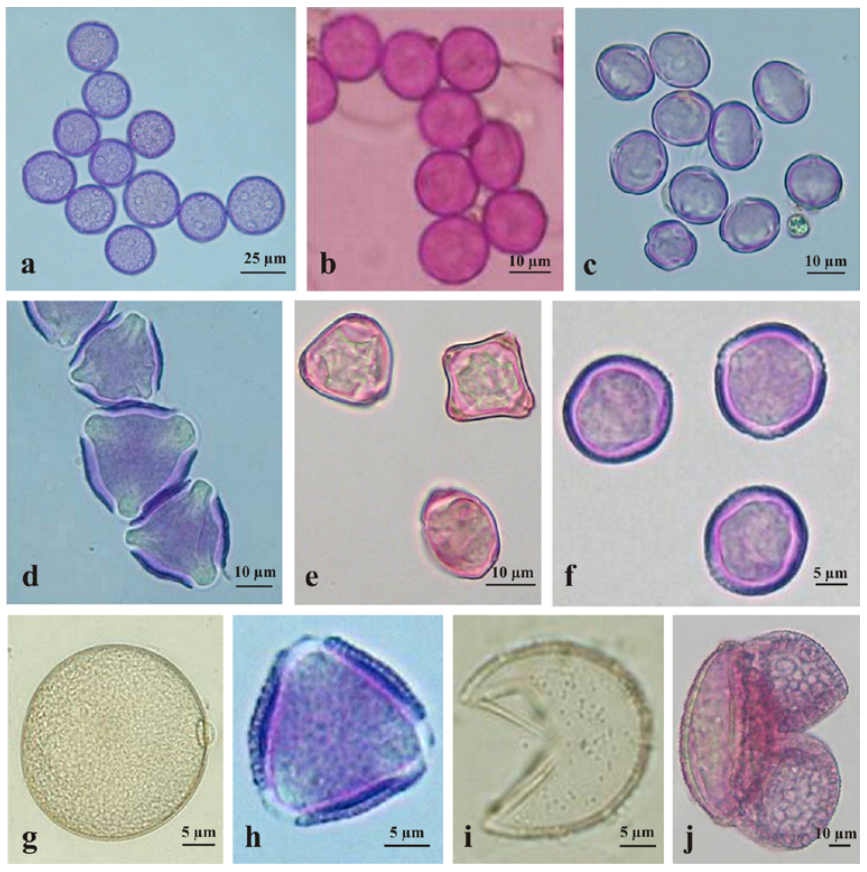
Pollen grains observed in aeroplankton of South Europe

=== Fungal spores ===
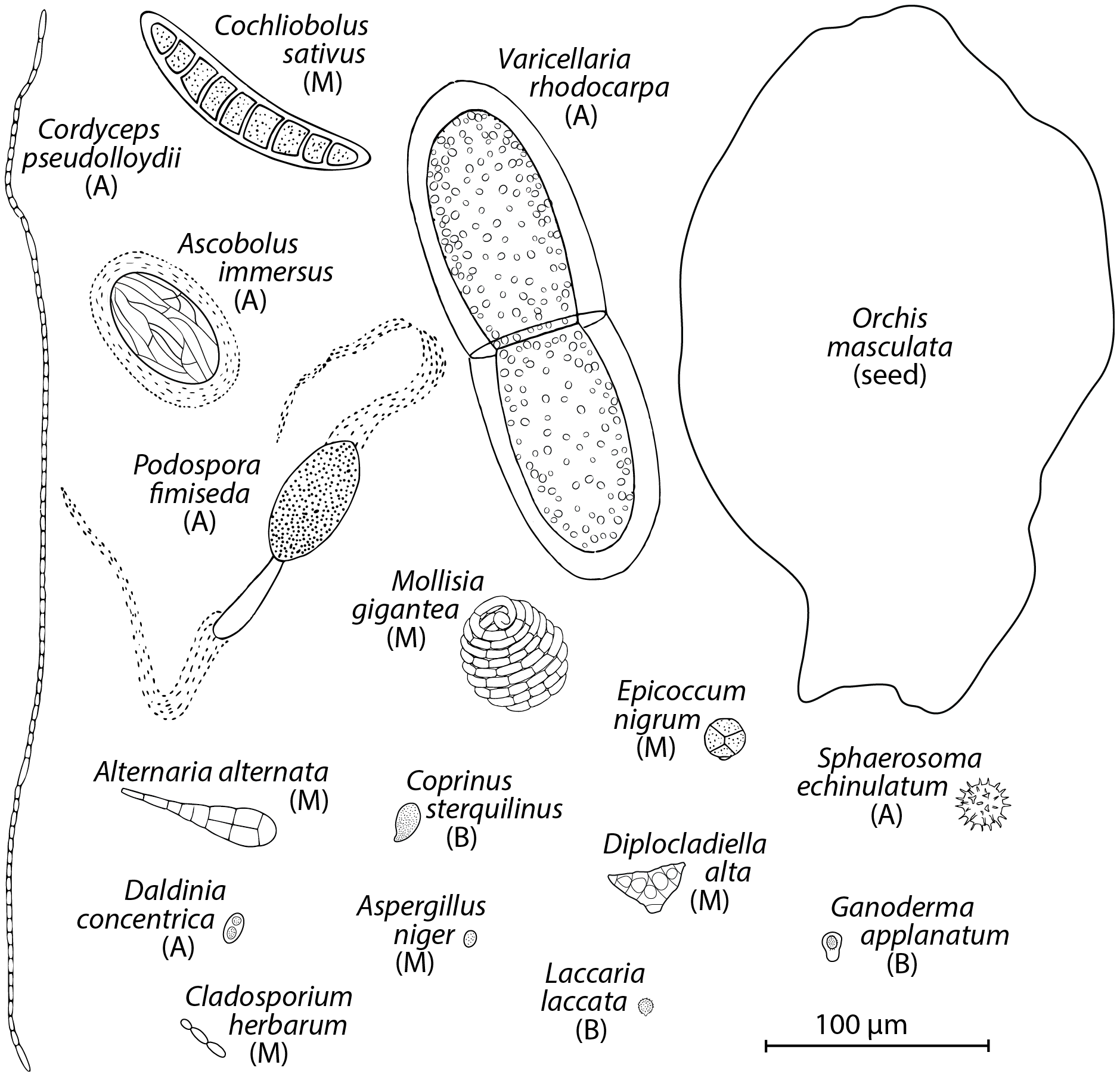
Drawings of fungal spores found in air. Some cause asthma, such as Alternaria alternata. A drawing of a very small "dust" seed from the flower Orchis maculata is provided for comparison. A = ascospore, B = basidiospore, M =mitospore

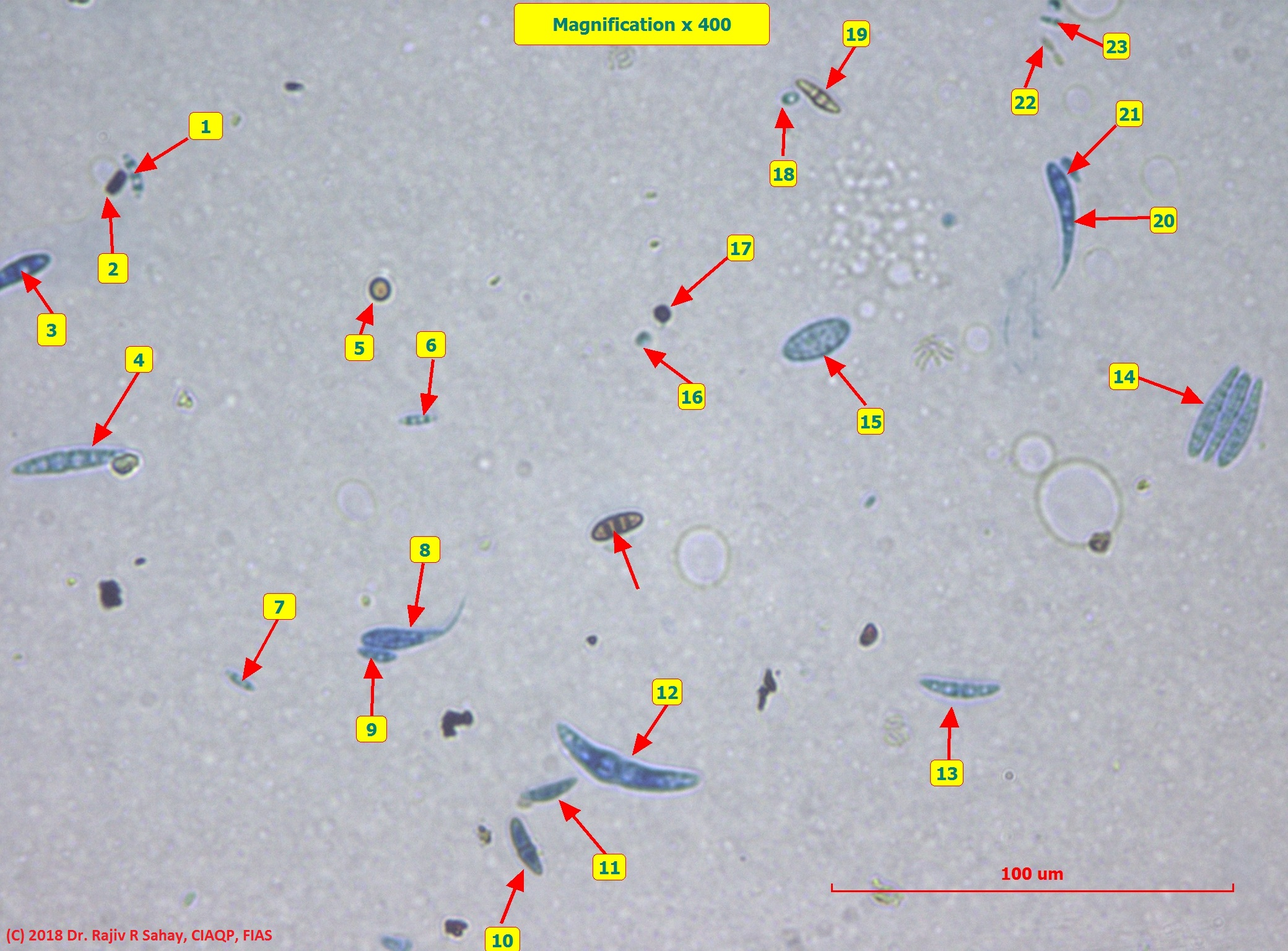
Airborne fungal spores

Fungi, a major element of atmospheric bioaerosols, are capable of existing and surviving in the air for extended periods of time. Both the spores and the mycelium may be dangerous for people suffering from allergies, causing various health issues including asthma. Apart from their negative impact on human health, atmospheric fungi may be dangerous for plants as sources of infection. Moreover, fungal organisms may be capable of creating additional toxins that are harmful to humans and animals, such as endotoxins or mycotoxins.

Considering this aspect, aeromycological research is considered capable of predicting future symptoms of plant diseases in both crops and wild plants. Fungi capable of travelling extensive distances with wind despite natural barriers, such as tall mountains, may be particularly relevant to understanding the role of fungi in plant disease. Notably, the presence of numerous fungal organisms pathogenic to plants has been determined in mountainous regions.

A wealth of correlative evidence suggests asthma is associated with fungi and triggered by elevated numbers of fungal spores in the environment. Intriguing are reports of thunderstorm asthma. In a now classic study from the United Kingdom, an outbreak of acute asthma was linked to increases in Didymella exitialis ascospores and Sporobolomyces basidiospores associated with a severe weather event. Thunderstorms are associated with spore plumes: when spore concentrations increase dramatically over a short period of time, for example from 20,000 spores/m^{3} to over 170,000 spores/m^{3} in 2 hours. However, other sources consider pollen or pollution as causes of thunderstorm asthma. Transoceanic and transcontinental dust events move large numbers of spores across vast distances and have the potential to impact public health, and similar correlative evidence links dust blown off the Sahara with pediatric emergency room admissions on the island of Trinidad.

=== Pteridophyte spores ===
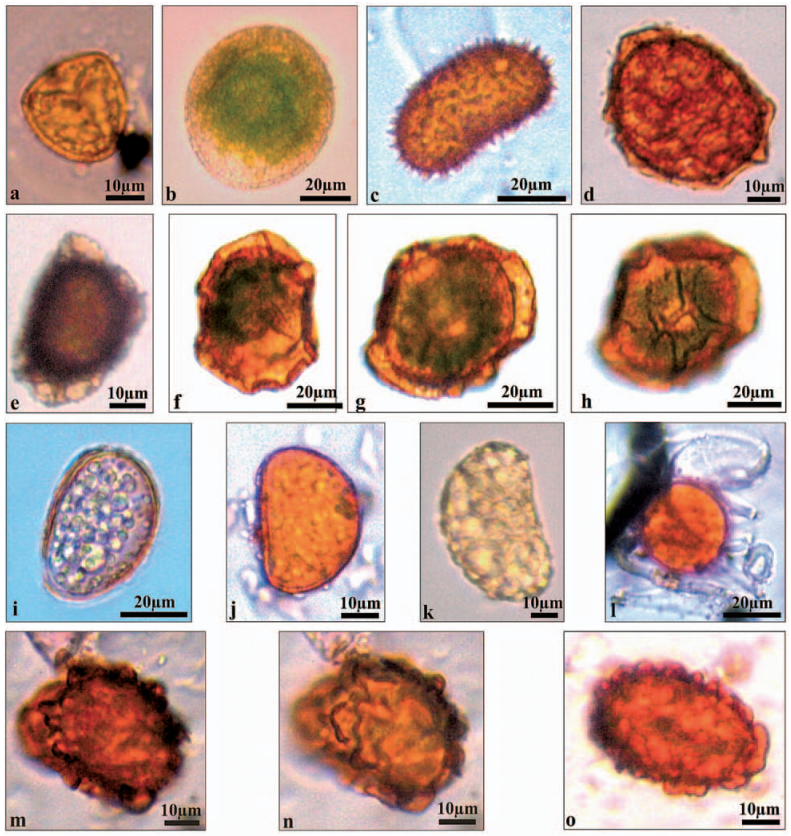
Pteridophyta spores, including fern spores, in the air of Lublin

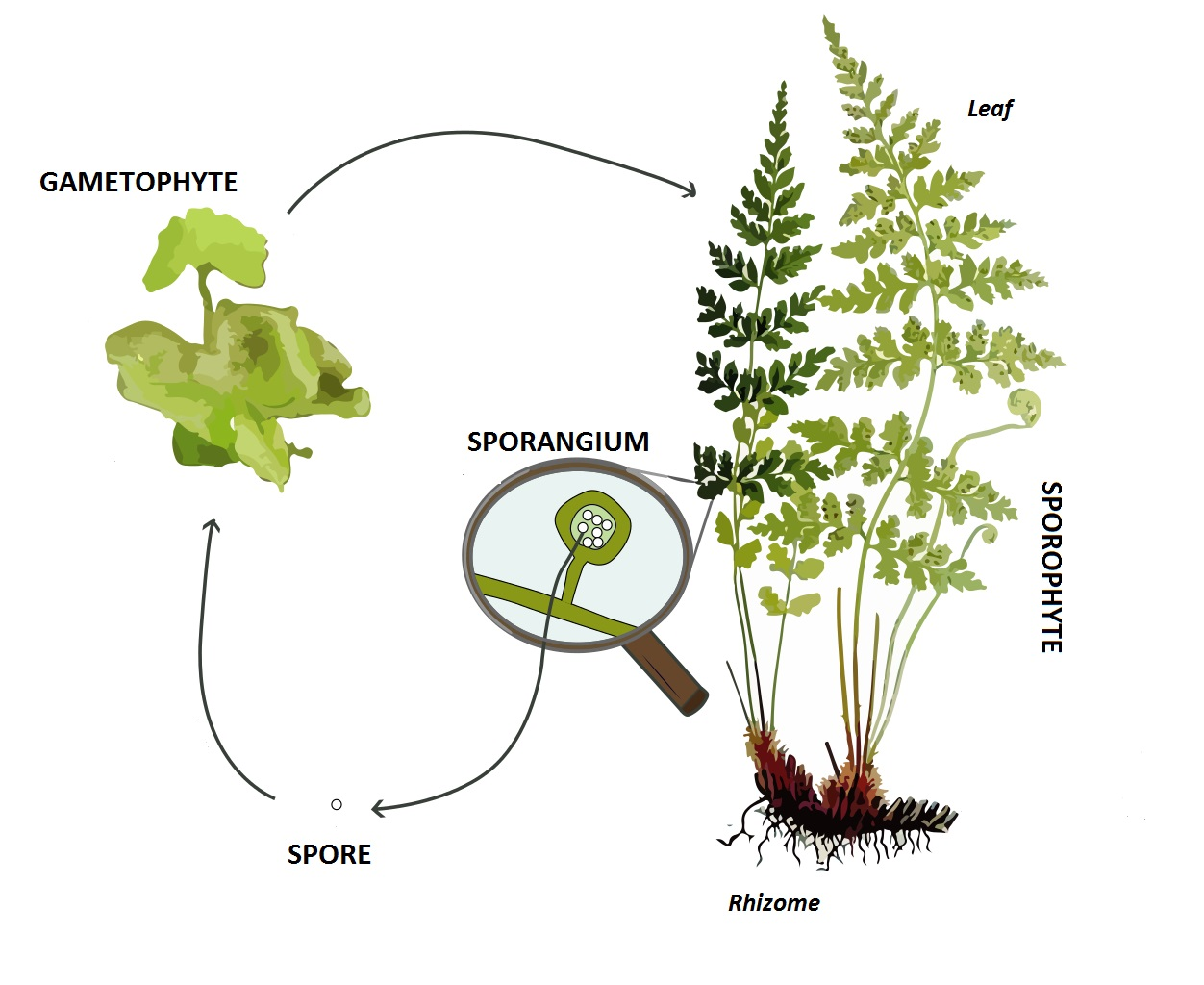
Pteridophyte life cycle

Pteridophytes are vascular plants that disperse spores, such as fern spores. Pteridophyte spores are similar to pollen grains and fungal spores, and are also components of aeroplankton. Fungal spores usually rank first among bioaerosol constituents due to their count numbers which can reach to between 1,000 and 10,000 per cubic metre (28 and 283/cu ft), while pollen grains and fern spores can each reach to between 10 and 100 per cubic metre (0.28 and 2.83/cu ft).

=== Arthropods ===
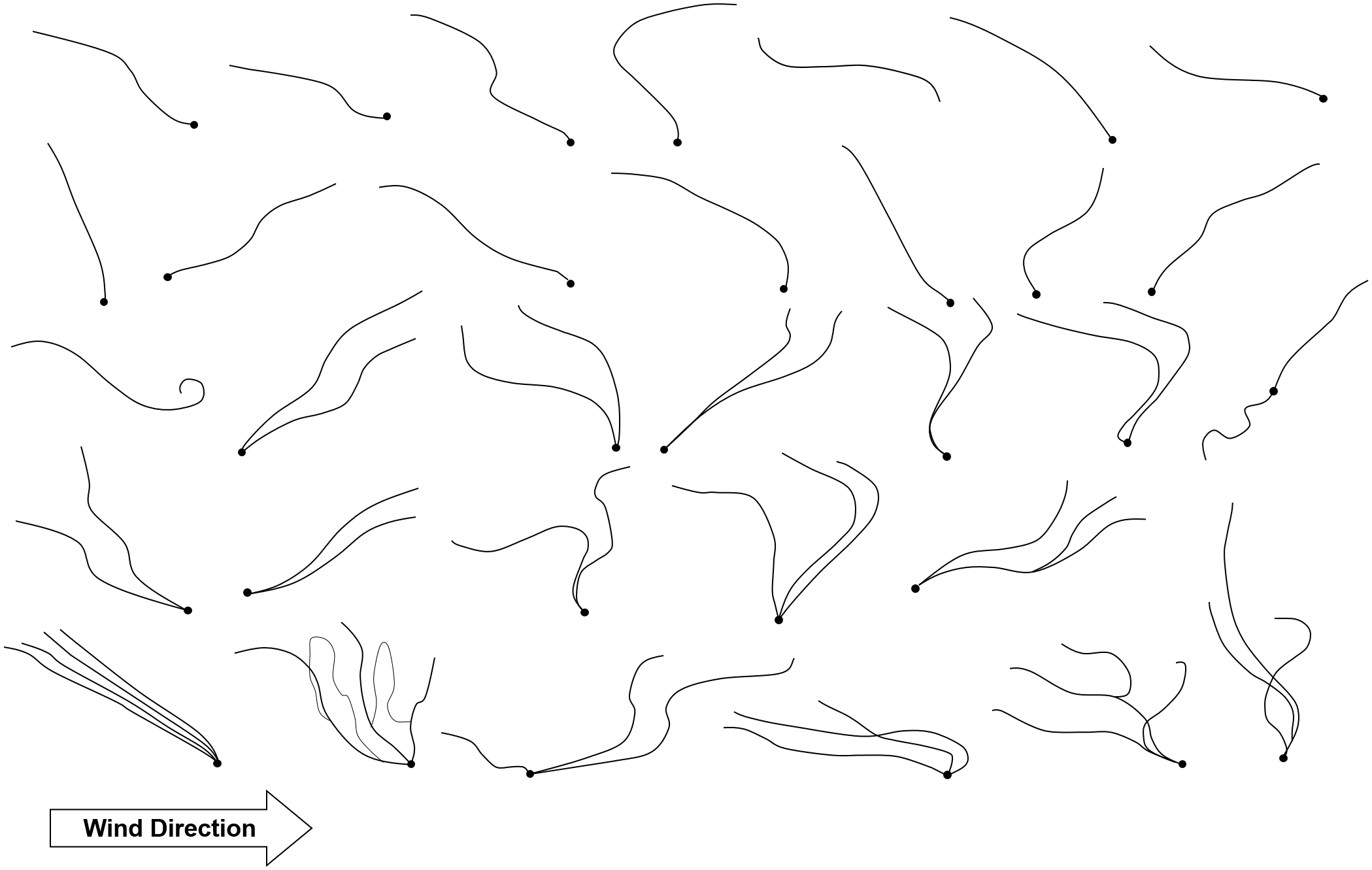
Spider ballooning structures. Black, thick points represent the spider's body. Black lines represent ballooning threads.

Many small animals, mainly arthropods (such as insects and spiders), are also carried upwards into the atmosphere by air currents and may be found floating several thousand feet up. Aphids, for example, are frequently found at high altitudes.

Ballooning, sometimes called kiting, is a process by which spiders, and some other small invertebrates, move through the air by releasing one or more gossamer threads to catch the wind, causing them to become airborne at the mercy of air currents. A spider (usually limited to individuals of a small species), or spiderling after hatching, will climb as high as it can, stand on raised legs with its abdomen pointed upwards ("tiptoeing"), and then release several silk threads from its spinnerets into the air. These automatically form a triangular shaped parachute which carries the spider away on updrafts of winds where even the slightest of breezes will disperse the arachnid. The flexibility of their silk draglines can aid the aerodynamics of their flight, causing the spiders to drift an unpredictable and sometimes long distance. Even atmospheric samples collected from balloons at 5 km (3.1 mi) altitude and ships mid-ocean have reported spider landings. Mortality is high.

Enough lift for ballooning may occur, even in windless conditions, if an electrostatic charge gradient is present in the atmosphere.

=== Nematodes ===
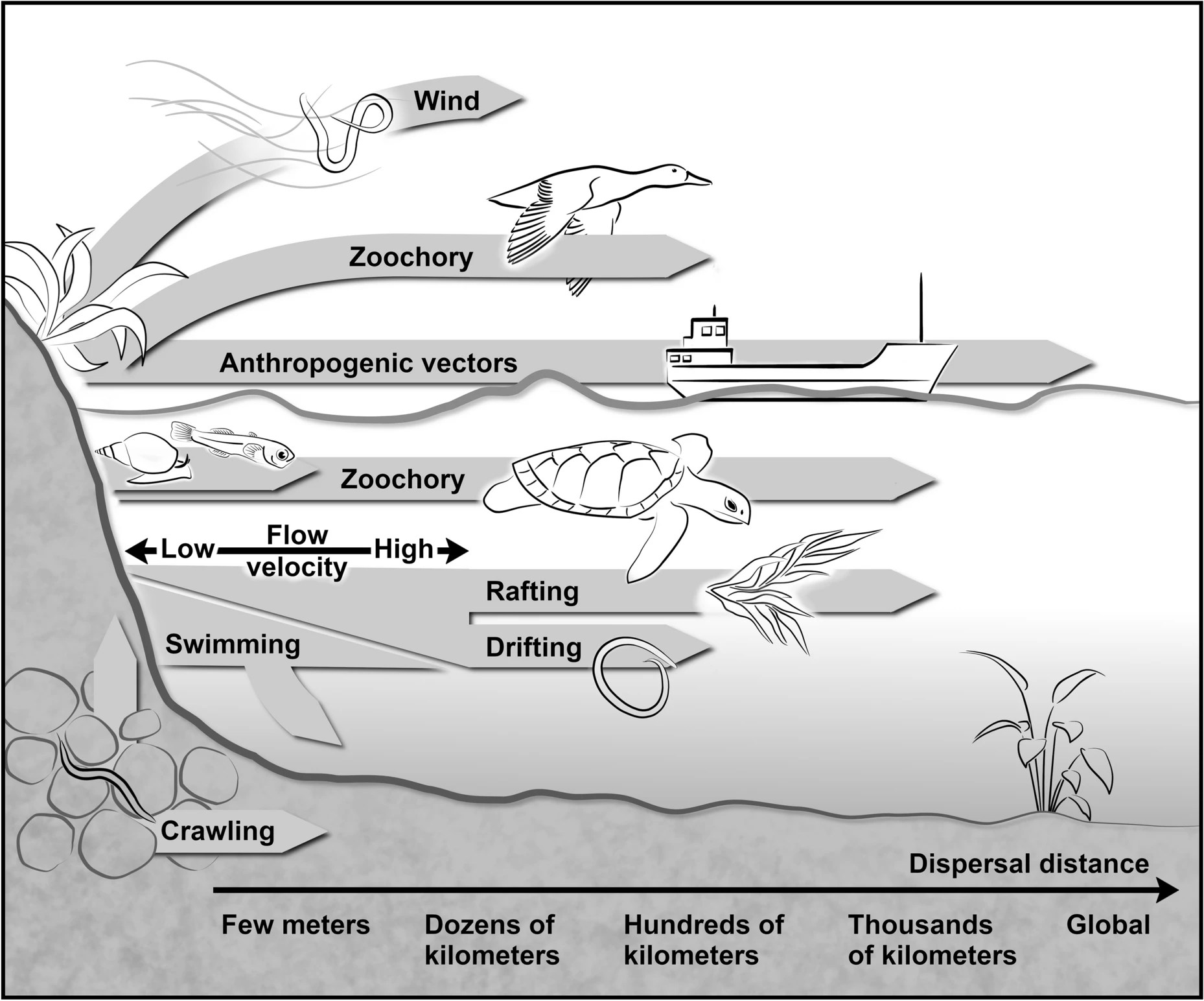
Distribution modes and possible geographic ranges of nematodes

Nematodes (roundworms), the most common animal taxon, are also found among aeroplankton. Nematodes are an essential trophic link between unicellular organisms like bacteria, and larger organisms such as tardigrades, copepods, flatworms, and fishes. For nematodes, anhydrobiosis is a widespread strategy allowing them to survive unfavorable conditions for months and even years. Accordingly, nematodes can be readily dispersed by wind. However, as reported by Vanschoenwinkel et al., nematodes account for only about one per cent of wind-drifted animals. Among the habitats colonized by nematodes are those that are strongly exposed to wind erosion as e.g., the shorelines of permanent waters, soils, mosses, dead wood, and tree bark. In addition, within a few days of forming temporary waters such as phytotelmata were shown to be colonized by numerous nematode species.

=== Unicellular microorganisms ===
A stream of unicellular airborne microorganisms circles the planet above weather systems but below commercial air lanes. Some microorganisms are swept up from terrestrial dust storms, but most originate from marine microorganisms in sea spray. In 2018, scientists reported that hundreds of millions of viruses and tens of millions of bacteria are deposited daily on every square meter around the planet.

The presence of airborne cyanobacteria and microalgae as well as their negative impacts on human health have been documented by many researchers worldwide. However, studies on cyanobacteria and microalgae are few compared with those on other bacteria and viruses. Research is especially lacking on the presence and taxonomic composition of cyanobacteria and microalgae near economically important water bodies with much tourism. Research on airborne algae is especially important in tourist areas near water-bodies. Sunbathers are exposed to particularly high quantities of harmful cyanobacteria and microalgae. Additionally, harmful microalgae and cyanobacteria blooms tend to occur in both marine and freshwater reservoirs during summer. Previous work has shown that the Mediterranean Sea is dominated by the picocyanobacteria Synechococcus sp. and Synechocystis sp., which are responsible for the production of a group of hepatotoxins known as microcystins. Because most tourism occurs in summer, many tourists are exposed to the most extreme negative impacts of airborne microalgae.

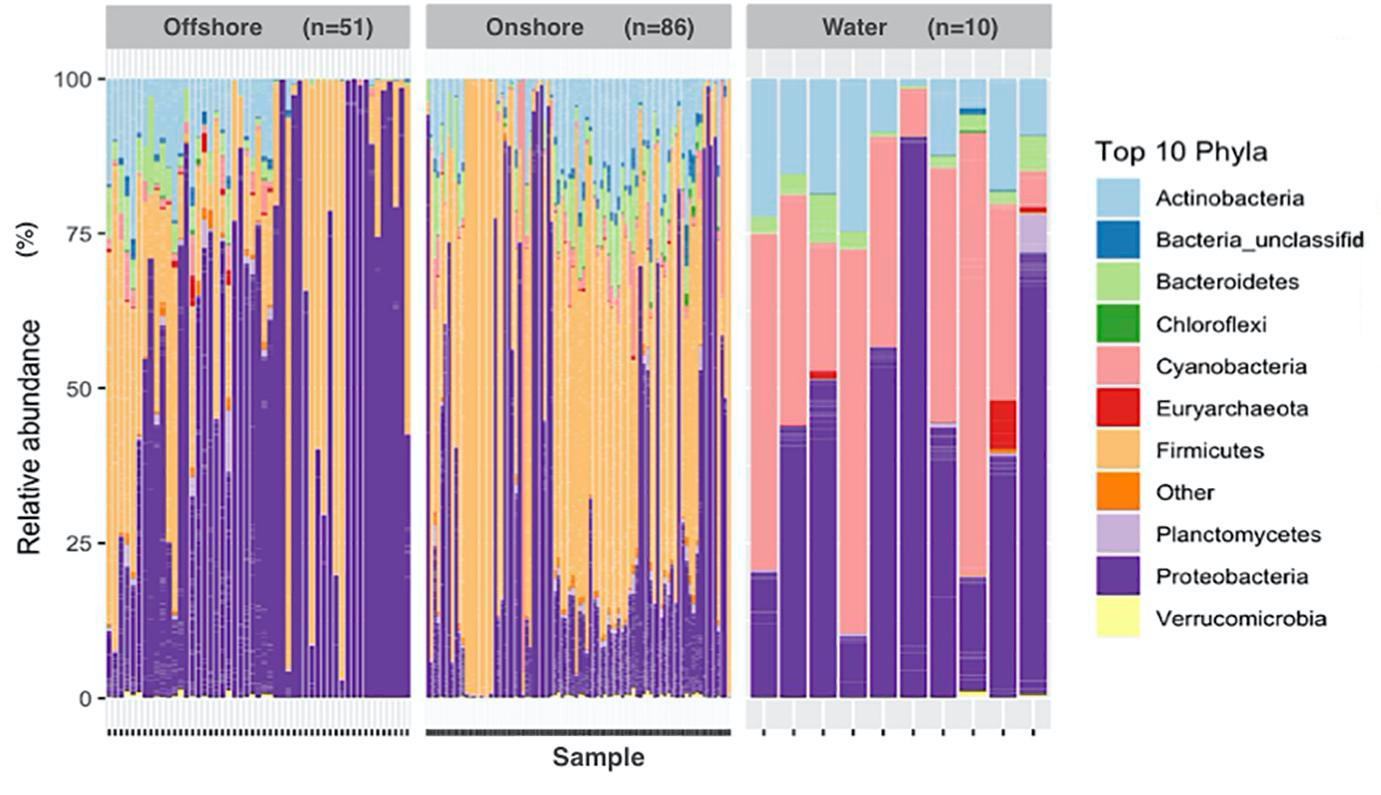
Comparison of windborne and surface-water prokaryote (bacteria plus archaea) communities over the Red Sea, showing their relative abundance during two years of DNA sequencing.

Airborne bacteria are emitted by most Earth surfaces (plants, oceans, land, and urban areas) to the atmosphere via a variety of mechanical processes such as aeolian soil erosion, sea spray production, or mechanical disturbances including anthropogenic activities. Due to their relatively small size (the median aerodynamic diameter of bacteria-containing particles is around 2–4 μm), these can then be transported upward by turbulent fluxes and carried by wind to long distances. As a consequence, bacteria are present in the air up to at least the lower stratosphere. Given that the atmosphere is a large conveyor belt that moves air over thousands of kilometers, microorganisms are disseminated globally. Airborne transport of microbes is therefore likely pervasive at the global scale, yet there have been only a limited number of studies that have looked at the spatial distribution of microbes across different geographical regions. One of the main difficulties is linked with the low microbial biomass associated with a high diversity existing in the atmosphere outdoor (~10^{2}–10^{5} cells/m^{3}) thus requiring reliable sampling procedures and controls. Furthermore, the site location and its environmental specificities have to be accounted for to some extent by considering chemical and meteorological variables.

The environmental role of airborne cyanobacteria and microalgae is only partly understood. While present in the air, cyanobacteria and microalgae can contribute to ice nucleation and cloud droplet formation. Cyanobacteria and microalgae can also impact human health. Depending on their size, airborne cyanobacteria and microalgae can be inhaled by humans and settle in different parts of the respiratory system, leading to the formation or intensification of numerous diseases and ailments, e.g., allergies, dermatitis, and rhinitis. According to Wiśniewska et al., these harmful microorganisms can constitute between 13% and 71% of sampled taxa. However, the interplay between microbes and atmospheric physical and chemical conditions is an open field of research that can only be fully addressed using multidisciplinary approaches.

Airborne microalgae and cyanobacteria are the most poorly studied organisms in aerobiology and phycology. This lack of knowledge may result from the lack of standard methods for both sampling and further analysis, especially quantitative analytical methods. Few studies have been performed to determine the number of cyanobacteria and microalgae in the atmosphere However, it was shown in 2012 that the average quantity of atmospheric algae is between 100 and 1000 cells per cubic meter of air. As of 2019, about 350 taxa of cyanobacteria and microalgae have been documented in the atmosphere worldwide. Cyanobacteria and microalgae end up in the air as a consequence of their emission from soil, buildings, trees, and roofs.

The bacterium Pseudomonas syringae can manufacture ice nucleation active (INA) proteins (which cause water in plants to freeze at temperatures higher than normal freezing point). In airborne versions of P. syringae, these proteins serve as atmospheric biological ice nucleators, so the bacteria can function as cloud condensation nuclei. Recent evidence has suggested the species plays a larger role than previously thought in producing rain and snow. They have also been found in the cores of hailstones, aiding in bioprecipitation.

Biological particles are known to represent a significant fraction (~20–70%) of the total number of aerosols > 0.2 μm, with large spatial and temporal variations. Among these, microorganisms are of particular interest in fields as diverse as epidemiology, including phytopathology, bioterrorism, forensic science, and public health, and environmental sciences, like microbial ecology, meteorology and climatology. More precisely concerning the latter, airborne microorganisms contribute to the pool of particles nucleating the condensation and crystallization of water and they are thus potentially involved in cloud formation and in the triggering of precipitation. Additionally, viable microbial cells act as chemical catalyzers interfering with atmospheric chemistry. The constant flux of bacteria from the atmosphere to the Earth's surface due to precipitation and dry deposition can also affect global biodiversity, but they are rarely taken into account when conducting ecological surveys. As stressed by these studies attempting to decipher and understand the spread of microbes over the planet, concerted data are needed for documenting the abundance and distribution of airborne microorganisms, including at remote and altitudes sites.

== Bioaerosols ==
Bioaerosols, known also as primary biological aerosols, are the subset of atmospheric particles that are directly released from the biosphere into the atmosphere. They include living and dead organisms (e.g., algae, archaea, bacteria), dispersal units (e.g., fungal spores and plant pollen), and various fragments or excretions (e.g., plant debris and brochosomes). Bioaerosol particle diameters range from nanometers up to about a tenth of a millimeter. The upper limit of the aerosol particle size range is determined by rapid sedimentation, i.e., larger particles are too heavy to remain airborne for extended periods of time. Bioaerosols include living and dead organisms as well as their fragments and excrements emitted from the biosphere into the atmosphere. Included are archaea, fungi, microalgae, cyanobacteria, bacteria, viruses, plant cell debris, and pollen.

Historically, the first investigations of the occurrence and dispersion of microorganisms and spores in the air can be traced back to the early 19th century. Since then, the study of bioaerosols has come a long way, and air samples collected with aircraft, balloons, and rockets have shown that bioaerosols released from land and ocean surfaces can be transported over long distances and up to very high altitudes, i.e., between continents and beyond the troposphere.

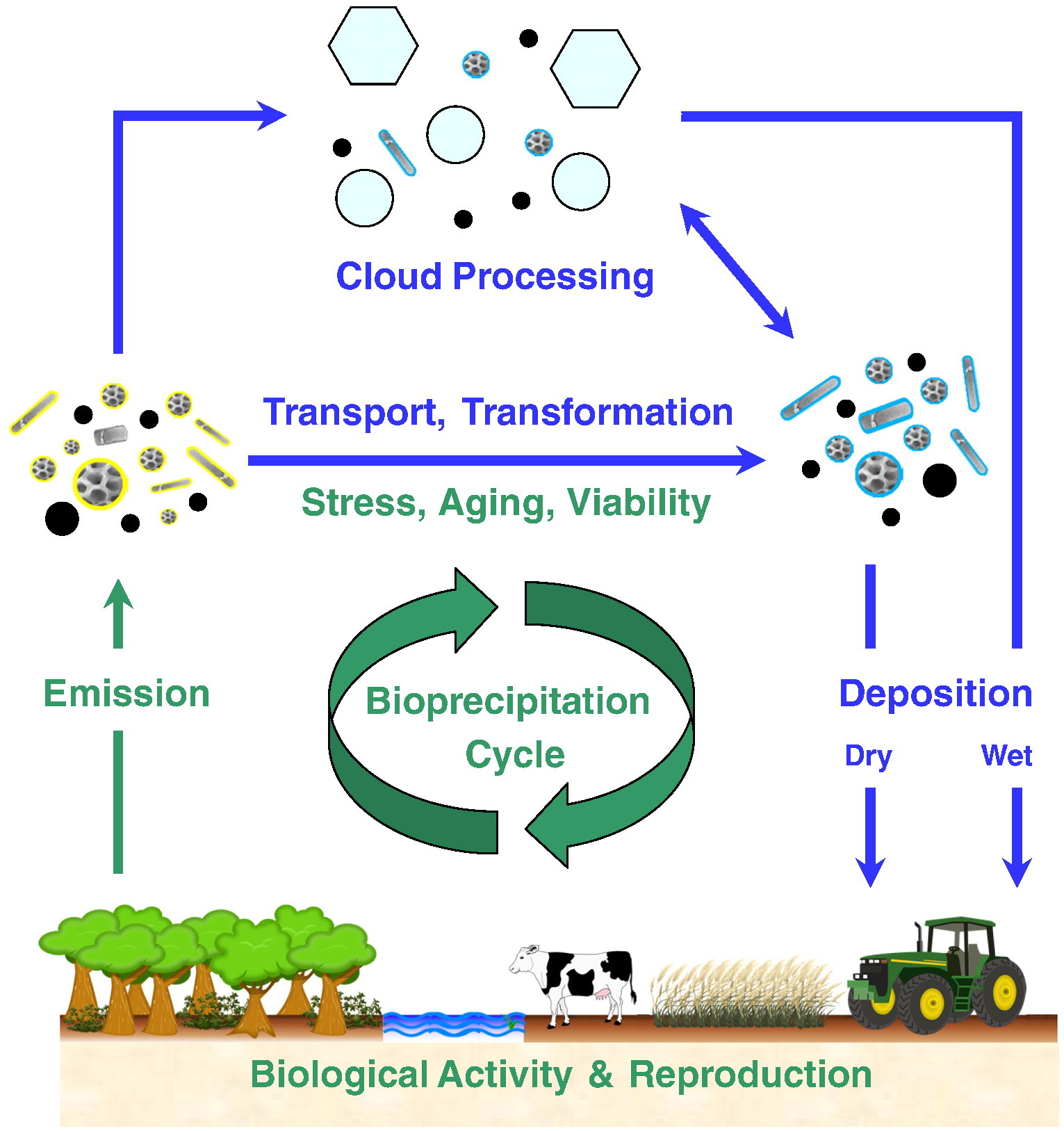
Global bioaerosol cycling
After emission from the biosphere, bioaerosol particles interact with other aerosol particles and trace gases in the atmosphere and can be involved in the formation of clouds and precipitation. After dry or wet deposition to the Earth's surface, viable bioparticles can contribute to biological reproduction and further emission. This feedback can be particularly efficient when coupled to the water cycle (bioprecipitation).
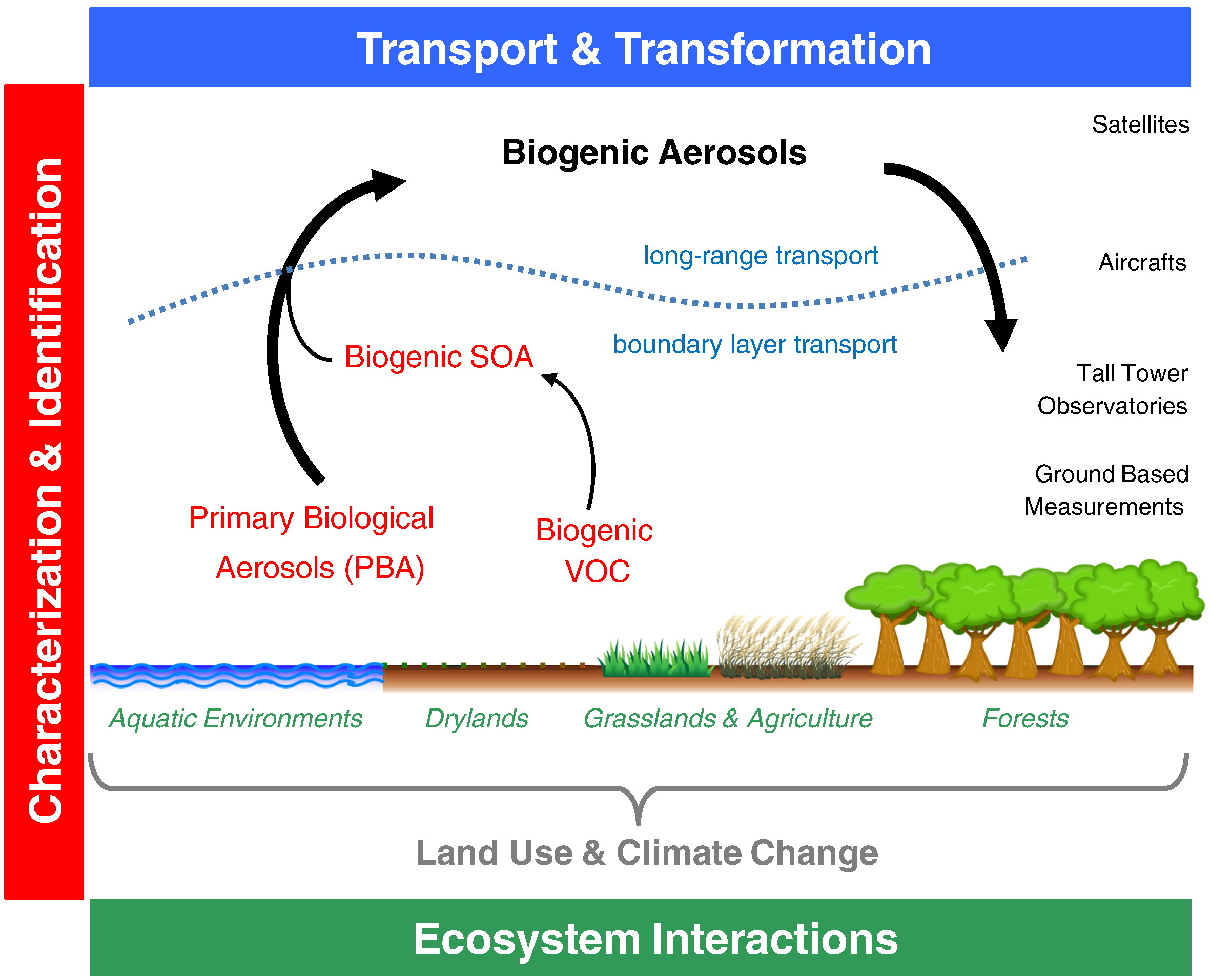
Global ecosystem interactions of bioaerosol particles
Key aspects and areas of research required to determine and quantify the interactions and effects of biogenic aerosol particles in the Earth system, including primary biological aerosols directly emitted to the atmosphere and secondary organic aerosols formed upon oxidation and gas-to-particle conversion of volatile organic compounds.

Bioaerosols play a key role in the dispersal of reproductive units from plants and microbes (pollen, spores, etc.), for which the atmosphere enables transport over geographic barriers and long distances. Bioaerosols are thus highly relevant for the spread of organisms, allowing genetic exchange between habitats and geographic shifts of biomes. They are central elements in the development, evolution, and dynamics of ecosystems.

== Dispersal ==
Dispersal is a vital component of an organism's life-history, and the potential for dispersal determines the distribution, abundance, and thus, the community dynamics of species at different sites. A new habitat must first be reached before filters such as organismal abilities and adaptations, the quality of a habitat, and the established biological community determine the colonization efficiency of a species. While larger animals can cover distances on their own and actively seek suitable habitats, small (<2 mm) organisms are often passively dispersed, resulting in their more ubiquitous occurrence. While active dispersal accounts for rather predictable distribution patterns, passive dispersal leads to a more randomized immigration of organisms. Mechanisms for passive dispersal are the transport on (epizoochory) or in (endozoochory) larger animals (e.g., flying insects, birds, or mammals) and the erosion by wind.

A propagule is any material that functions in propagating an organism to the next stage in its life cycle, such as by dispersal. The propagule is usually distinct in form from the parent organism. Propagules are produced by plants (in the form of seeds or spores), fungi (in the form of spores), and bacteria (for example endospores or microbial cysts). Often cited as an important requirement for effective wind dispersal is the presence of propagules (e.g., resting eggs, cysts, ephippia, juvenile and adult resting stages), which also enables organisms to survive unfavorable environmental conditions until they enter a suitable habitat. These dispersal units can be blown from surfaces such as soil, moss, and the desiccated sediments of temporary or intermittent waters. The passively dispersed organisms are typically pioneer colonizers.

However, wind-drifted species vary in their vagility (probability to be transported with the wind), with the weight and form of the propagules, and therefore, the wind speed required for their transport, determining the dispersal distance. For example, in nematodes, resting eggs are less effectively transported by wind than other life stages, while organisms in anhydrobiosis are lighter and thus more readily transported than hydrated forms. Because different organisms are, for the most part, not dispersed over the same distances, source habitats are also important, with the number of organisms contained in air declining with increasing distance from the source system. The distances covered by small animals range from a few meters, to hundreds, to thousands of meters. While the wind dispersal of aquatic organisms is possible even during the wet phase of a transiently aquatic habitat, during the dry stages a larger number of dormant propagules are exposed to wind and thus dispersed. Freshwater organisms that must "cross the dry ocean" to enter new aquatic island systems will be passively dispersed more successfully than terrestrial taxa. Numerous taxa from both soil and freshwater systems have been captured from the air (e.g., bacteria, several algae, ciliates, flagellates, rotifers, crustaceans, mites, and tardigrades). While these have been qualitatively well studied, accurate estimates of their dispersal rates are lacking.

== Transport and distribution ==
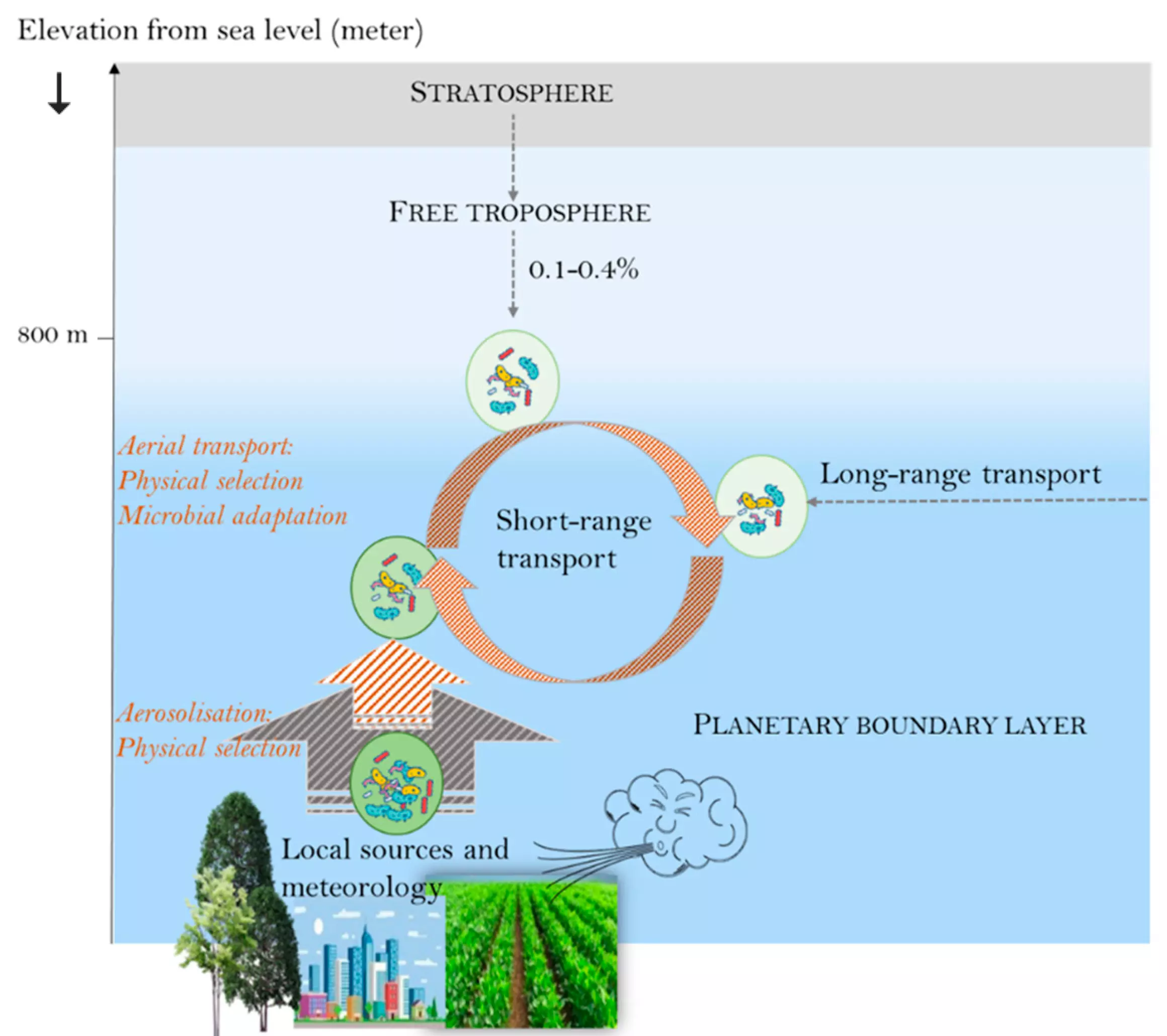
Factors controlling microbial communities
of the planetary boundary layer

Once aerosolized, microbial cells enter the planetary boundary layer, defined as the air layer near the ground directly influenced by the planetary surface. The concentration and taxonomic diversity of airborne microbial communities in the planetary boundary layer has been recently described, though the functional potential of airborne microbial communities remains unknown.

From the planetary boundary layer, the microbial community might eventually be transported upwards by air currents into the free troposphere (air layer above the planetary boundary layer) or even higher into the stratosphere. Microorganisms might undergo a selection process during their way up into the troposphere and the stratosphere.

Subject to gravity, aerosols (or particulate matter) as well as bioaerosols become concentrated in the lower part of the troposphere that is called the planetary boundary layer. Microbial concentrations thus usually show a vertical stratification from the bottom to the top of the troposphere with average estimated bacterial concentrations of 900 to 2 × 10^{7} cells per cubic metre in the planetary boundary layer and 40 to 8 × 10^{4} cells per cubic metre in the highest part of the troposphere called the free troposphere. The troposphere is the most dynamic layer in terms of chemistry and physics of aerosols and harbors complex chemical reactions and meteorological phenomena that lead to the coexistence of a gas phase, liquid phases (i.e., cloud, rain, and fog water) and solid phases (i.e., microscopic particulate matter, sand dust). The various atmospheric phases represent multiple biological niches.

Possible processes in the way atmospheric microbial communities can distribute themselves have recently been investigated in meteorology, seasons, surface conditions and global air circulation.

=== Over space and time ===
Microorganisms attached to aerosols can travel intercontinental distances, survive, and further colonize remote environments. Airborne microbes are influenced by environmental and climatic patterns that are predicted to change in the near future, with unknown consequences. Airborne microbial communities play significant roles in public health and meteorological processes, so it is important to understand how these communities are distributed over time and space.

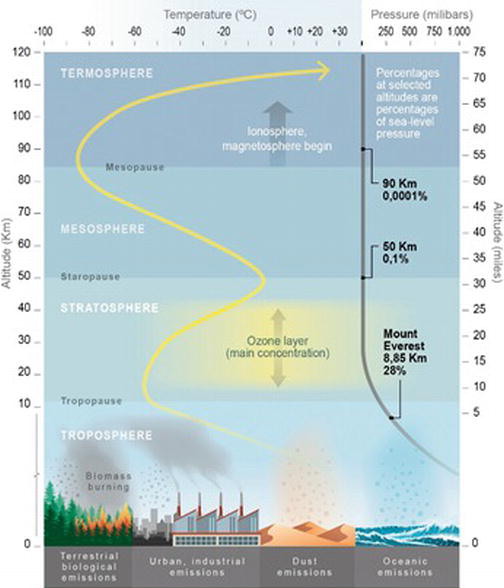
Atmosphere layers, temperature and airborne emission sources

Most studies have focused on laboratory cultivation to identify possible metabolic functions of microbial strains of atmospheric origin, mainly from cloud water. Given that cultivable organisms represent about 1% of the entire microbial community, culture-independent techniques and especially metagenomic studies applied to atmospheric microbiology have the potential to provide additional information on the selection and genetic adaptation of airborne microorganisms.

There are some metagenomic studies on airborne microbial communities over specific sites. Metagenomic investigations of complex microbial communities in many ecosystems (for example, soil, seawater, lakes, feces and sludge) have provided evidence that microorganism functional signatures reflect the abiotic conditions of their environment, with different relative abundances of specific microbial functional classes. This observed correlation of microbial-community functional potential and the physical and chemical characteristics of their environments could have resulted from genetic modifications (microbial adaptation) and/or physical selection. The latter refers to the death of sensitive cells and the survival of resistant or previously adapted cells. This physical selection can occur when microorganisms are exposed to physiologically adverse conditions.

The presence of a specific microbial functional signature in the atmosphere has not been investigated yet. Microbial strains of airborne origin have been shown to survive and develop under conditions typically found in cloud water (i.e., high concentrations of H_{2}O_{2}, typical cloud carbonaceous sources, ultraviolet – UV – radiation etc. While atmospheric chemicals might lead to some microbial adaptation, physical and unfavorable conditions of the atmosphere such as UV radiation, low water content and cold temperatures might select which microorganisms can survive in the atmosphere. From the pool of microbial cells being aerosolized from Earth's surfaces, these adverse conditions might act as a filter in selecting cells already resistant to unfavorable physical conditions. Fungal cells and especially fungal spores might be particularly adapted to survive in the atmosphere due to their innate resistance and might behave differently than bacterial cells. Still, the proportion and nature (i.e., fungi versus bacteria) of microbial cells that are resistant to the harsh atmospheric conditions within airborne microbial communities are unknown.

Airborne microbial transport is central to dispersal outcomes and several studies have demonstrated diverse microbial biosignatures are recoverable from the atmosphere. Microbial transport has been shown to occur across inter-continental distances above terrestrial habitats. Variation has been recorded seasonally, with underlying land use, and due to stochastic weather events such as dust storms. There is evidence specific bacterial taxa (e.g., Actinomycetota and some Gammaproteobacteria) are preferentially aerosolized from oceans.

=== Over urban areas ===
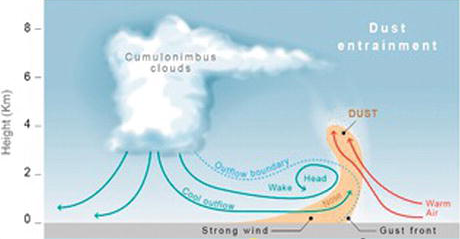
Dust storms as a source of aerosolized bacteria

As a result of rapid industrialization and urbanization, global megacities have been impacted by extensive and intense particulate matter pollution events, which have potential human health consequences. Severe particulate matter pollution is associated with chronic obstructive pulmonary disease and asthma, as well as risks for early death. While the chemical components of particulate matter pollution and their impacts on human health have been widely studied, the potential impact of pollutant-associated microbes remains unclear. Airborne microbial exposure, including exposure to dust-associated organisms, has been established to both protect against and exacerbate certain diseases. Understanding the temporal dynamics of the taxonomic and functional diversity of microorganisms in urban air, especially during smog events, will improve understanding of the potential microbe-associated health consequences.

Recent advances in airborne particle DNA extraction and metagenomic library preparation have enabled low biomass environments to be subject to shotgun sequencing analysis. In 2020, Qin et al. used shotgun sequencing analysis to reveal a great diversity of microbial species and antibiotic resistant genes in Beijing's particulate matter, largely consistent with a recent study. The data suggest that potential pathogen and antibiotic resistance burden increases with increasing pollution levels and that severe smog events promote the exposure. In addition, the particulate matter also contained several bacteria that harbored antibiotic resistant genes flanked by mobile genetic elements, which could be associated with horizontal gene transfer. Many of these bacteria were typical or putative members of the human microbiome.

== Clouds ==
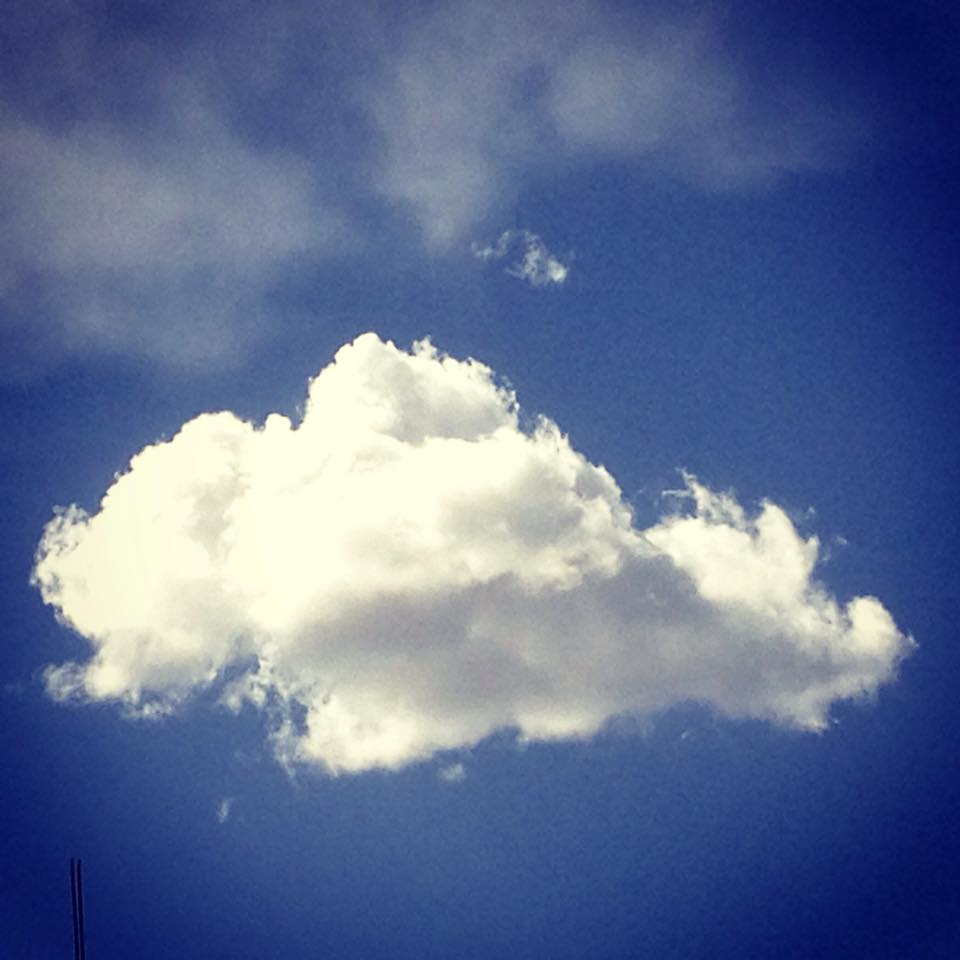
Clouds can transport microorganisms and disperse them over long distances.

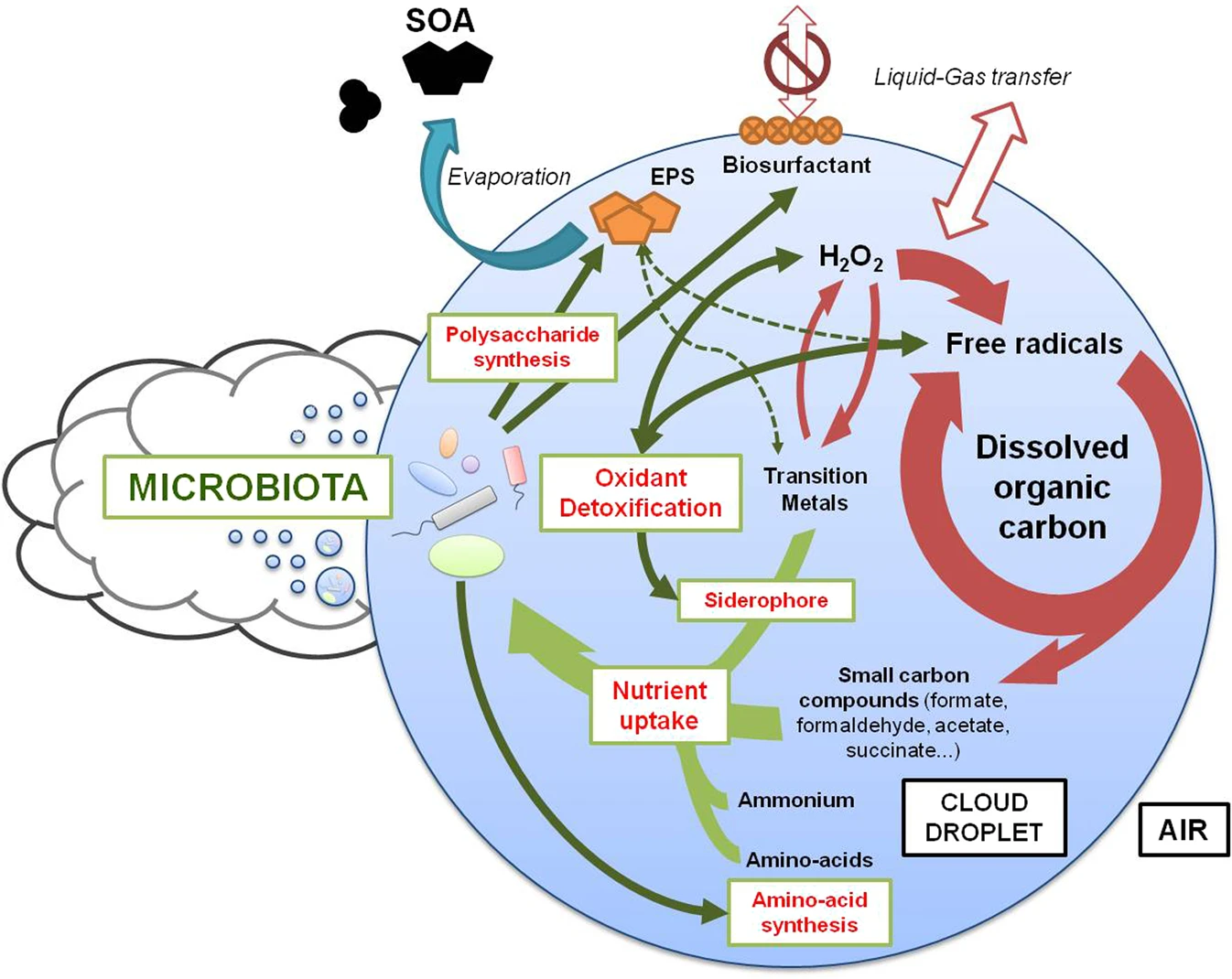
Impact of microbial activity on clouds Biological processes and their targets are indicated by green arrows, while red arrows indicate abiotic processes. EPS: Exopolysaccharide SOA: Secondary organic aerosol Based on coordinated metagenomics/metatranscriptomics

The outdoor atmosphere harbors diverse microbial assemblages composed of bacteria, fungi and viruses whose functioning remains largely unexplored. While the occasional presence of human pathogens or opportunists can cause potential hazard, in general the vast majority of airborne microbes originate from natural environments like soil or plants, with large spatial and temporal variations of biomass and biodiversity. Once ripped off and aerosolized from surfaces by mechanical disturbances such as those generated by wind, raindrop impacts or water bubbling, microbial cells are transported upward by turbulent fluxes. They remain aloft for an average of ~3 days, a time long enough for being transported across oceans and continents until being finally deposited, eventually helped by water condensation and precipitation processes; microbial aerosols themselves can contribute to form clouds and trigger precipitation by serving as cloud condensation nuclei and ice nuclei.

Living airborne microorganisms may end up concretizing aerial dispersion by colonizing their new habitat, provided that they survive their journey from emission to deposition. Bacterial survival is indeed naturally impaired during atmospheric transport, but a fraction remains viable. At high altitude, the peculiar environments offered by cloud droplets are thus regarded in some aspects as temporary microbial habitats, providing water and nutrients to airborne living cells. In addition, the detection of low levels of heterotrophy raises questions about microbial functioning in cloud water and its potential influence on the chemical reactivity of these complex and dynamic environments. The metabolic functioning of microbial cells in clouds is still albeit unknown, while fundamental for apprehending microbial life conditions during long distance aerial transport and their geochemical and ecological impacts.

Aerosols affect cloud formation, thereby influencing sunlight irradiation and precipitation, but the extent to which and the manner in which they influence climate remains uncertain. Marine aerosols consist of a complex mixture of sea salt, non-sea-salt sulfate and organic molecules and can function as nuclei for cloud condensation, influencing the radiation balance and, hence, climate. For example, biogenic aerosols in remote marine environments (for example, the Southern Ocean) can increase the number and size of cloud droplets, having similar effects on climate as aerosols in highly polluted regions. Specifically, phytoplankton emit dimethylsulfide, and its derivate sulfate promotes cloud condensation. Understanding the ways in which marine phytoplankton contribute to aerosols will allow better predictions of how changing ocean conditions will affect clouds and feed back on climate. In addition, the atmosphere itself contains about 10^{22} microbial cells, and determining the ability of atmospheric microorganisms to grow and form aggregates will be valuable for assessing their influence on climate.

After the tantalizing detection of phosphine (PH_{3}) in the atmosphere of the planet Venus, and in the absence of a known and plausible chemical mechanism to explain the formation of this molecule, Greaves et al. speculated in 2020 that microorganisms might be present in suspension in the Venusian atmosphere. They have formulated the hypothesis of the microbial formation of phosphine, envisaging the possibility of a liveable window in the Venusian clouds at a certain altitude with an acceptable temperature range for microbial life. However, in 2021 Hallsworth et al. examined the conditions required to support the life of extremophile microorganisms in the clouds at high altitude in the Venusian atmosphere where favorable temperature conditions might prevail. Beside the presence of sulfuric acid in the clouds which already represent a major challenge for the survival of most of microorganisms, they came to the conclusion that the Venusian atmosphere is too dry to host microbial life. They determined a water activity ≤ 0.004, two orders of magnitude below the 0.585 limit for known extremophiles.

== Airborne microbiomes ==
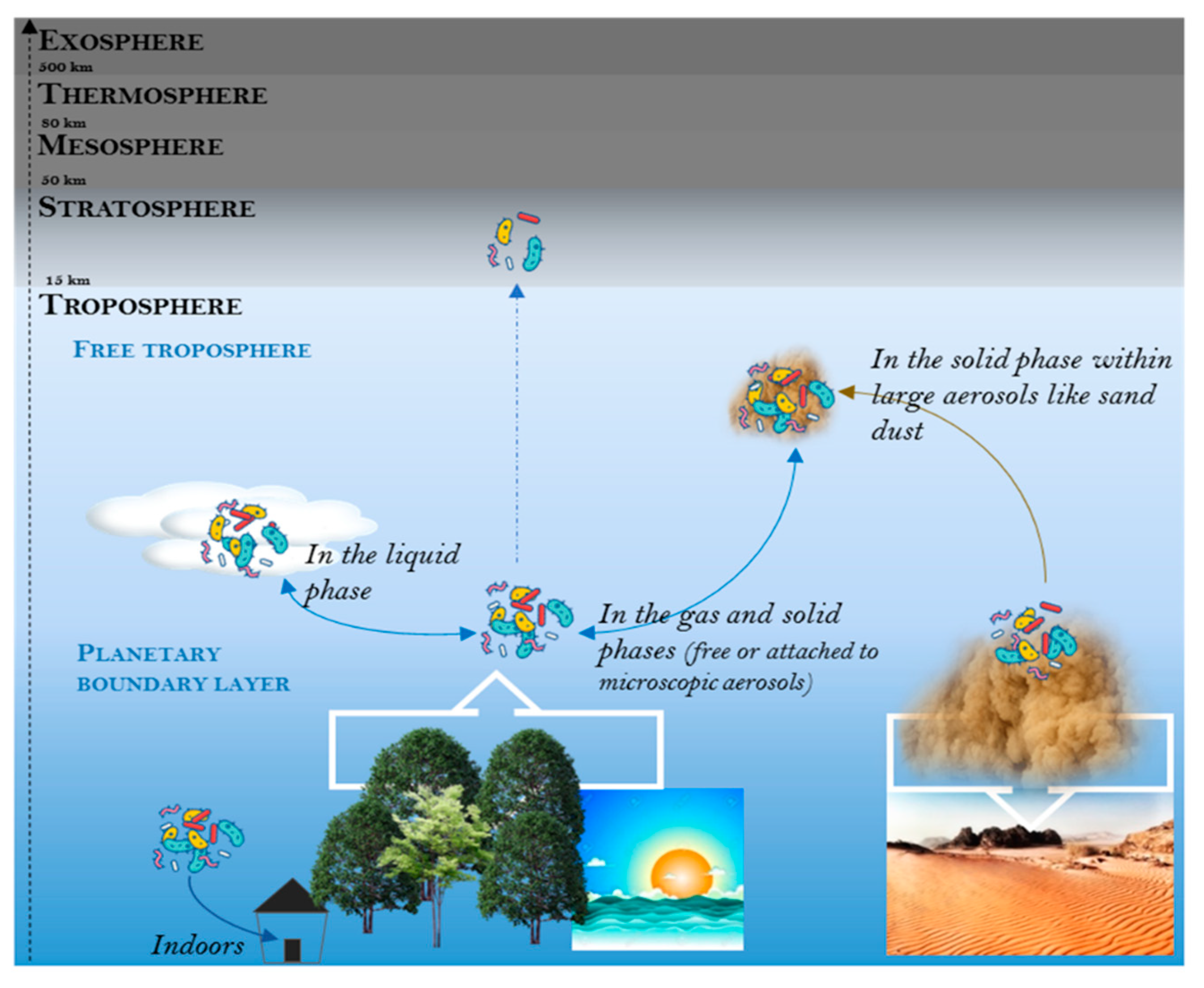
Biological habitats (niches) in aeromicrobiology

While the physical and chemical properties of airborne particulate matter have been extensively studied, their associated airborne microbiome remains largely unexplored. Microbiomes are defined as characteristic microbial communities, which include prokaryotes, fungi, protozoa, other micro-eukaryotes and viruses, that occupy well-defined habitats. The term microbiome is broader than other terms, for example, microbial communities, microbial population, microbiota or microbial flora, as microbiome refers to both its composition (the microorganisms involved) and its functions (their members' activities and interactions with the host/environment), which contribute to ecosystem functions.

Throughout Earth's history, microbial communities have changed the climate, and climate has shaped microbial communities. Microorganisms can modify ecosystem processes or biogeochemistry on a global scale, and we start to uncover their role and potential involvement in changing the climate. However, the effects of climate change on microbial communities (i.e., diversity, dynamics, or distribution) are rarely addressed. In the case of fungal aerobiota, its composition is likely influenced by dispersal ability, rather than season or climate. Indeed, the origin of air masses from marine, terrestrial, or anthropogenic-impacted environments, mainly shapes the atmospheric air microbiome. However, recent studies have shown that meteorological factors and seasonality influence the composition of airborne bacterial communities. This evidence suggests that climatic conditions may act as an environmental filter for the aeroplankton, selecting a subset of species from the regional pool, and raises the question of the relative importance of the different factors affecting both bacterial and eukaryal aeroplankton.

In 2020, Archer et al. reported evidence for a dynamic microbial presence at the ocean–atmosphere interface at the Great Barrier Reef, and identified air mass trajectories over oceanic and continental surfaces associated with observed shifts in airborne bacterial and fungal diversity. Relative abundance of shared taxa between air and coral microbiomes varied between 2.2 and 8.8% and included those identified as part of the core coral microbiome. Above marine systems, the abundance of microorganisms decreases exponentially with distance from land, but relatively little is known about potential patterns in biodiversity for airborne microorganisms above the oceans. Here we test the hypothesis that persistent microbial inputs to the ocean–atmosphere interface of the Great Barrier Reef ecosystem vary according to surface cover (i.e. land vs. ocean) during transit of the air-mass.

== Airborne DNA ==
In 2021, researchers demonstrated that environmental DNA (eDNA) can be collected from air and used to identify mammals. In 2023, scientists developed a specialized sampling probe and aircraft surveys to assess biodiversity of multiple taxa, including mammals, using air eDNA.

== Gallery ==
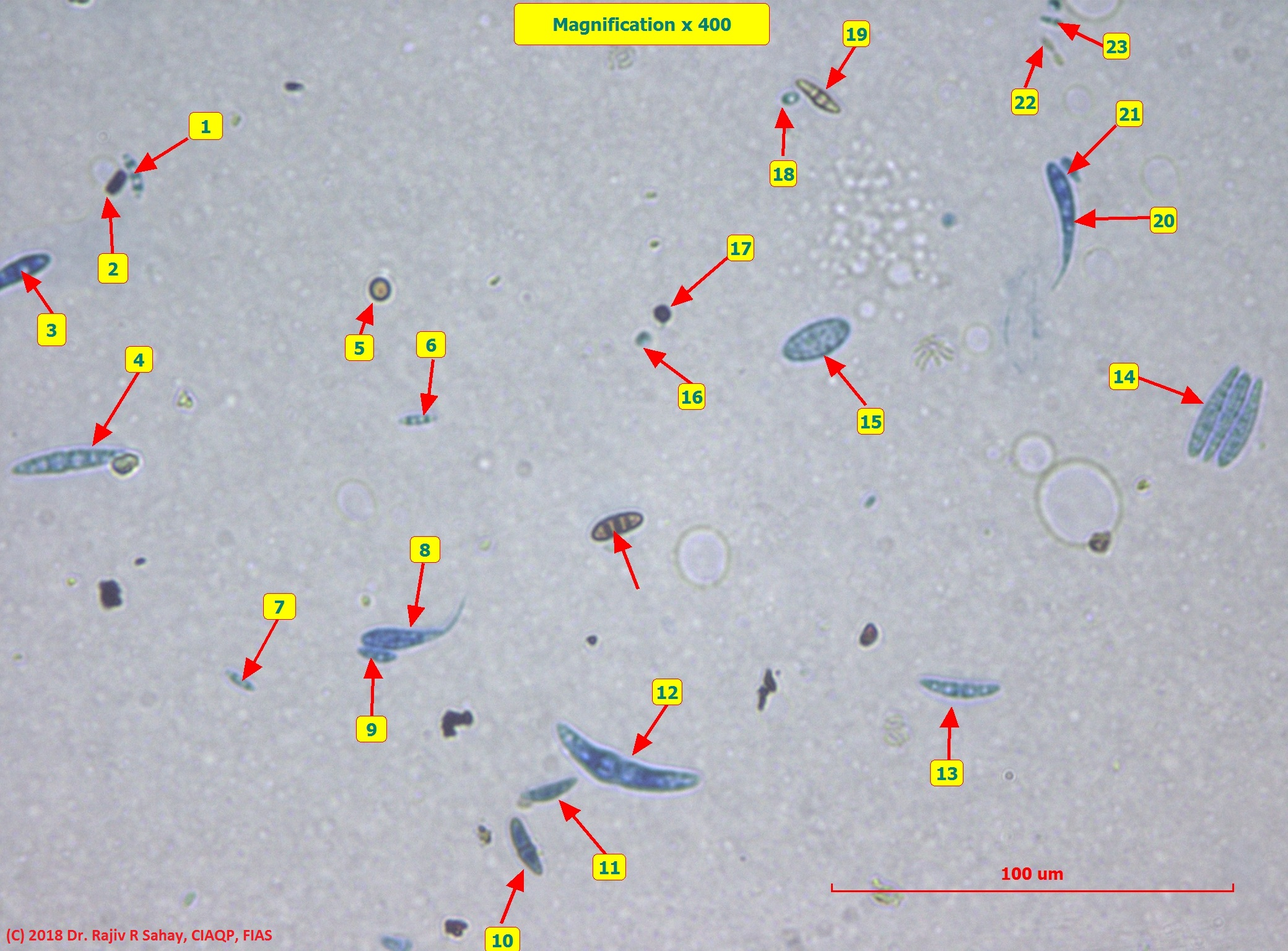
Airborne fungal spores

== See also ==
- Aeolian processes
- Aerobiology
- Airborne transmission
- Biological dispersal
  - Dispersal vector
  - Seed dispersal
- Organisms at high altitude
- Palynology

== General reference ==
- Cox, Christopher S.; Wathes, Christopher M. (25 November 2020). Bioaerosols Handbook. CRC Press. ISBN 978-1-000-11504-8.
