= Fixation (histology) =

Preservation of biological tissue

In the fields of histology, pathology, and cell biology, fixation is the preservation of biological tissues from decay due to autolysis or putrefaction. It terminates any ongoing biochemical reactions and may also increase the treated tissues' mechanical strength or stability. Tissue fixation is a critical step in the preparation of histological sections, its broad objective being to preserve cells and tissue components and to do this in such a way as to allow for the preparation of thin, stained sections. This allows the investigation of the tissues' structure, which is determined by the shapes and sizes of such macromolecules (in and around cells) as proteins and nucleic acids.

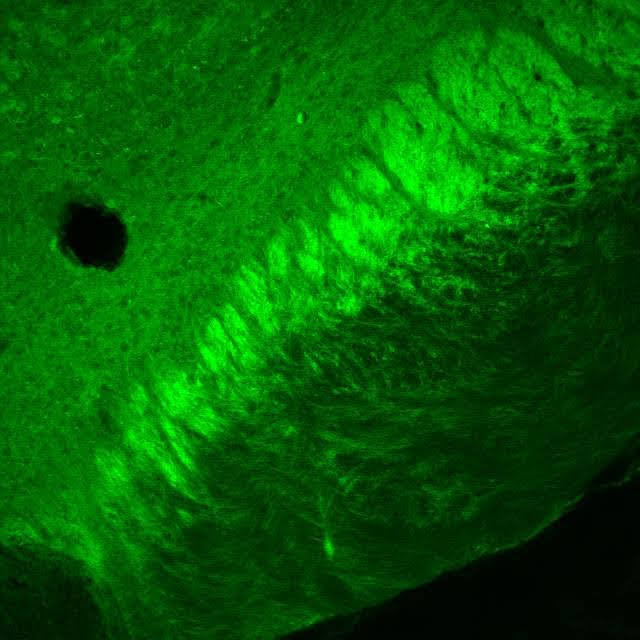
Mouse brain tissue, fixed via perfusion, stained via immunohistochemistry and imaged using confocal microscopy.

== Purposes ==
In performing their protective role, fixatives denature proteins by coagulation, by forming additive compounds, or by a combination of coagulation and additive processes. A compound that adds chemically to macromolecules stabilizes structure most effectively if it is able to combine with parts of two different macromolecules, an effect known as cross-linking. Fixation of tissue is done for several reasons. One reason is to kill the tissue so that postmortem decay (autolysis and putrefaction) is prevented. Fixation preserves biological material (tissue or cells) as close to its natural state as possible in the process of preparing tissue for examination. To achieve this, several conditions usually must be met.

First, a fixative usually acts to disable intrinsic biomolecules—particularly proteolytic enzymes—which otherwise digest or damage the sample.

Second, a fixative typically protects a sample from extrinsic damage. Fixatives are toxic to most common microorganisms (bacteria in particular) that might exist in a tissue sample or which might otherwise colonize the fixed tissue. In addition, many fixatives chemically alter the fixed material to make it less palatable (either indigestible or toxic) to opportunistic microorganisms.

Finally, fixatives often alter the cells or tissues on a molecular level to increase their mechanical strength or stability. This increased strength and rigidity can help preserve the morphology (shape and structure) of the sample as it is processed for further analysis.

Even the most careful fixation does alter the sample and introduce artifacts that can interfere with interpretation of cellular ultrastructure. A prominent example is the bacterial mesosome, which was thought to be an organelle in gram-positive bacteria in the 1970s, but was later shown by new techniques developed for electron microscopy to be simply an artifact of chemical fixation. Standardization of fixation and other tissue processing procedures takes this introduction of artifacts into account, by establishing what procedures introduce which kinds of artifacts. Researchers who know what types of artifacts to expect with each tissue type and processing technique can accurately interpret sections with artifacts, or choose techniques that minimize artifacts in areas of interest.

== Choosing a fixative procedure ==
Fixation is usually the first stage in a multistep process to prepare a sample of biological material for microscopy or other analysis. Therefore, the choice of fixative and fixation protocol may depend on the additional processing steps and final analyses that are planned. For example, immunohistochemistry uses antibodies that bind to a specific protein target. Prolonged fixation can chemically mask these targets and prevent antibody binding. In these cases, a 'quick fix' method using cold formalin for around 24 hours is typically used. Methanol (100%) can also be used for quick fixation, and that time can vary depending on the biological material. For example, MDA-MB 231 human breast cancer cells can be fixed for only 3 minutes with cold methanol (-20 °C). For enzyme localization studies, the tissues should either be pre-fixed lightly only, or post-fixed after the enzyme activity product has formed.

== Types of fixation and processes ==
There are generally three types of fixation processes depending on the sample that needs to be fixed.

=== Heat fixation ===
Heat fixation is used for the fixation of single cell organisms, most commonly bacteria and archaea. The organisms are typically mixed with water or physiological saline which helps to evenly spread out the sample. Once diluted, the sample is spread onto a microscope slide. This diluted bacteria sample is commonly referred to as a smear after it is placed on a slide. After a smear has dried at room temperature, the slide is gripped by tongs or a clothespin and passed through the flame of a Bunsen burner several times to heat-kill and adhere the organism to the slide. A microincinerating device can also be used. After heating, samples are typically stained and then imaged using a microscope. Heat fixation generally preserves overall morphology but not internal structures. Heat denatures the proteolytic enzyme and prevents autolysis. Heat fixation cannot be used in the capsular stain method as heat fixation will shrink or destroy the capsule (glycocalyx) and cannot be seen in stains.

=== Immersion ===
Immersion can be used to fix histological samples from a single cell to an entire organism. The sample of tissue is immersed in fixative solution for a set period of time. The fixative solution must have a volume at least 10 times greater than the volume of the tissue. In order for fixation to be successful, the fixative must diffuse throughout the entire tissue, so tissue size and density, as well as type of fixative must be considered. This is a common technique for cellular applications, but can be used for larger tissues as well. Using a larger sample means it must be immersed longer for the fixative to reach the deeper tissue.

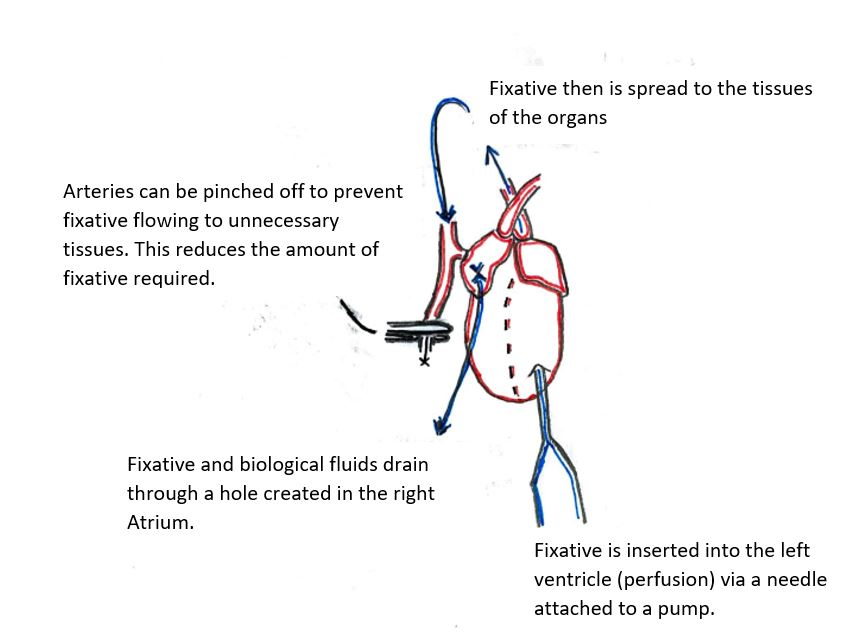

=== Perfusion ===
Perfusion is the passage of fluid through the blood vessels or natural channels of an organ or organism. In tissue fixation via perfusion, the fixative is pumped into the circulatory system, usually through a needle inserted into the left ventricle. This can be done via ultrasound guidance, or by opening the chest cavity of the subject. The fixative is injected into the heart with the injection volume matching the typical cardiac output. Using the innate circulatory system, the fixative is distributed throughout the entire body, and the tissue doesn't die until it is fixed. When this method is used, a drainage port must also be added somewhere in the circulatory system to account for the addition of the volume of the fixative and buffer, this is typically done in the right atrium. The fixative is pumped into the circulatory system until it has replaced all of the blood. Using perfusion has the advantage of preserving morphology, but the disadvantages are that the subject dies and the volume of fixative needed for larger organisms is high, potentially raising costs. It is possible to decrease the necessary volume of fluid to perform a perfusion fixation by pinching off arteries that feed tissues not of interest to the research involved. Perfusion fixation is commonly used to image brain, lung, and kidney tissues in rodents, and is also used in performing autopsies in humans.

== Chemical fixation ==
In both immersion and perfusion fixation processes, chemical fixatives are used to preserve structures in a state (both chemically and structurally) as close to living tissue as possible. This requires a chemical fixative.

=== Crosslinking fixatives – aldehydes ===
Crosslinking fixatives act by creating covalent chemical bonds between proteins in tissue. This anchors soluble proteins to the cytoskeleton, and lends additional rigidity to the tissue. Preservation of transient or fine cytoskeletal structure such as contractions during embryonic differentiation waves is best achieved by a pretreatment using microwaves before the addition of a cross linking fixative.

The most commonly used fixative in histology is formaldehyde. It is usually used as a 10% neutral buffered formalin (NBF), that is approx. 3.7%–4.0% formaldehyde in phosphate buffer, pH 7. Since formaldehyde is a gas at room temperature, formalin – formaldehyde gas dissolved in water (~37% w/v) – is used when making the former fixative. Formaldehyde fixes tissue by cross-linking the proteins, primarily the residues of the basic amino acid lysine. Its effects are reversible by excess water and it avoids formalin pigmentation. Paraformaldehyde is also commonly used and will depolymerize back to formalin when heated, also making it an effective fixative. Other benefits to paraformaldehyde include long term storage and good tissue penetration. It is particularly good for immunohistochemistry techniques. The formaldehyde vapor can also be used as a fixative for cell smears.

Another popular aldehyde for fixation is glutaraldehyde. It operates similarly to formaldehyde, causing the deformation of proteins' α-helices. However glutaraldehyde is a larger molecule than formaldehyde, and so permeates membranes more slowly. Consequently, glutaraldehyde fixation on thicker tissue samples can be difficult; this can be troubleshot by reducing the size of the tissue sample. One of the advantages of glutaraldehyde fixation is that it may offer a more rigid or tightly linked fixed product—its greater length and two aldehyde groups allow it to 'bridge' and link more distant pairs of protein molecules. It causes rapid and irreversible changes, is well suited for electron microscopy, works well at 4 °C, and gives the best overall cytoplasmic and nuclear detail. It is, however, not ideal for immunohistochemistry staining.

Some fixation protocols call for a combination of formaldehyde and glutaraldehyde so that their respective strengths complement one another.

These crosslinking fixatives, especially formaldehyde, tend to preserve the secondary structure of proteins and may also preserve most tertiary structure.

=== Precipitating fixatives – alcohols ===
Precipitating (or denaturing) fixatives act by reducing the solubility of protein molecules and often by disrupting the hydrophobic interactions that give many proteins their tertiary structure. The precipitation and aggregation of proteins is a very different process from the crosslinking that occurs with aldehyde fixatives.

The most common precipitating fixatives are ethanol and methanol. They are commonly used to fix frozen sections and smears. Acetone is also used and has been shown to produce better histological preservation than frozen sections when employed in the Acetone Methylbenzoate Xylene (AMEX) technique.

Protein-denaturing methanol, ethanol and acetone are rarely used alone for fixing blocks unless studying nucleic acids.

Acetic acid is a denaturant that is sometimes used in combination with the other precipitating fixatives, such as Davidson's AFA. The alcohols, by themselves, are known to cause considerable shrinkage and hardening of tissue during fixation while acetic acid alone is associated with tissue swelling; combining the two may result in better preservation of tissue morphology.

=== Oxidizing agents ===
The oxidizing fixatives can react with the side chains of proteins and other biomolecules, allowing the formation of crosslinks that stabilize tissue structure. However they cause extensive denaturation despite preserving fine cell structure and are used mainly as secondary fixatives.

Osmium tetroxide is often used as a secondary fixative when samples are prepared for electron microscopy. (It is not used for light microscopy as it penetrates thick sections of tissue very poorly.)

Potassium dichromate, chromic acid, and potassium permanganate all find use in certain specific histological preparations.

=== Mercurials ===
Mercurials such as B-5 and Zenker's fixative have an unknown mechanism that increases staining brightness and give excellent nuclear detail. Despite being fast, mercurials penetrate poorly and produce tissue shrinkage. Their best application is for fixation of hematopoietic and reticuloendothelial tissues. Also note that since they contain mercury, care must be taken with disposal.

=== Picrates ===
Picrates penetrate tissue well to react with histones and basic proteins to form crystalline picrates with amino acids and precipitate all proteins. It is a good fixative for connective tissue, preserves glycogen well, and extracts lipids to give superior results to formaldehyde in immunostaining of biogenic and polypeptide hormones However, it causes a loss of basophils unless the specimen is thoroughly washed following fixation.

=== HOPE fixative ===
Hepes-glutamic acid buffer-mediated organic solvent protection effect (HOPE) gives formalin-like morphology, excellent preservation of protein antigens for immunohistochemistry and enzyme histochemistry, good RNA and DNA yields and absence of crosslinking proteins.

== See also ==
- Karnovsky fixative
- Carnoy's solution
