= Cytochemistry =

Branch of cell biology

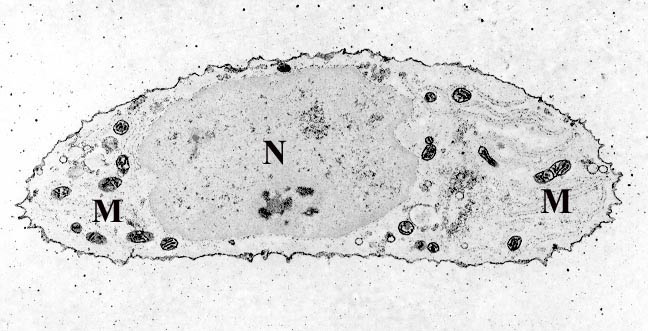
Transmission electron micrograph of a chondrocyte, stained for calcium, showing its nucleus (N) and mitochondria (M).

Cytochemistry is the branch of cell biology dealing with the detection of cell constituents by means of biochemical analysis and visualization techniques. This is the study of the localization of cellular components through the use of staining methods. The term is also used to describe a process of identification of the biochemical content of cells. Cytochemistry is a science of localizing chemical components of cells and cell organelles on thin histological sections by using several techniques like enzyme localization, micro-incineration, micro-spectrophotometry, radioautography, cryo-electron microscopy, X-ray microanalysis by energy-dispersive X-ray spectroscopy, immunohistochemistry and cytochemistry, etc.

== Freeze fracture enzyme cytochemistry ==
Freeze fracture enzyme cytochemistry was initially mentioned in the study of Pinto de silva in 1987. It is a technique that allows the introduction of cytochemistry into a freeze fracture cell membrane. immunocytochemistry is used in this technique to label and visualize the cell membrane's molecules. This technique could be useful in analyzing the ultrastructure of cell membranes. The combination of immunocytochemistry and freeze fracture enzyme technique, research can identify and have a better understanding of the structure and distribution of a cell membrane.

== Origin ==
Jean Brachet's research in Brussel demonstrated the localization and relative abundance between RNA and DNA in the cells of both animals and plants opened up the door into the research of cytochemistry. The work by Moller and Holter in 1976 about endocytosis which discussed the relationship between a cell's structure and function had established the needs of cytochemical research.

== Aims ==
Cytochemical research aims to study individual cells that may contain several cell types within a tissue. It takes a nondestructive approach to study the localization of the cell. By remaining the cell components intact, researcher are able to study the intact cell activity rather than studying an isolated biochemical activity which the result may be influenced by the distorted cell membrane and spatial difference.
