= Karnovsky fixative =

Fixative for electron microscopy

Karnovsky fixative, developed by the pathologist Morris J. Karnovsky (1926–2018), is a fixative for electron microscopy.

== Solution ==
The stock solution for Karnovsky fixative is as follows:

- 2.0 g paraformaldehyde
- 25 ml distilled water
- 1M sodium hydroxide 2 to 4 drops
- 50% glutaraldehyde 5.0 ml
- 0.2M cacodylate buffer, pH 7.4, 20.0 ml

Mix the paraformaldehyde with 25 ml of distilled water in a 125 ml Erlenmeyer flask. Heat to 60 °C on a stir plate. When moisture forms on the sides of flask, add sodium hydroxide and stir until the solution clears. Cool solution under the faucet. Filter, add glutaraldehyde and 0.2M buffer, pH range 7.2 to 7.4.

== Modified solutions ==
Karnovsky's fixative solution is often modified for specialized applications. For example, 2% paraformaldehyde, 2.5% glutaraldehyde in 0.1 Molar sodium phosphate buffer (pH 7.4) has been used to study the ultrastructure of renal pelvis fragments.
