= Aerobiology =

Study of airborne organisms

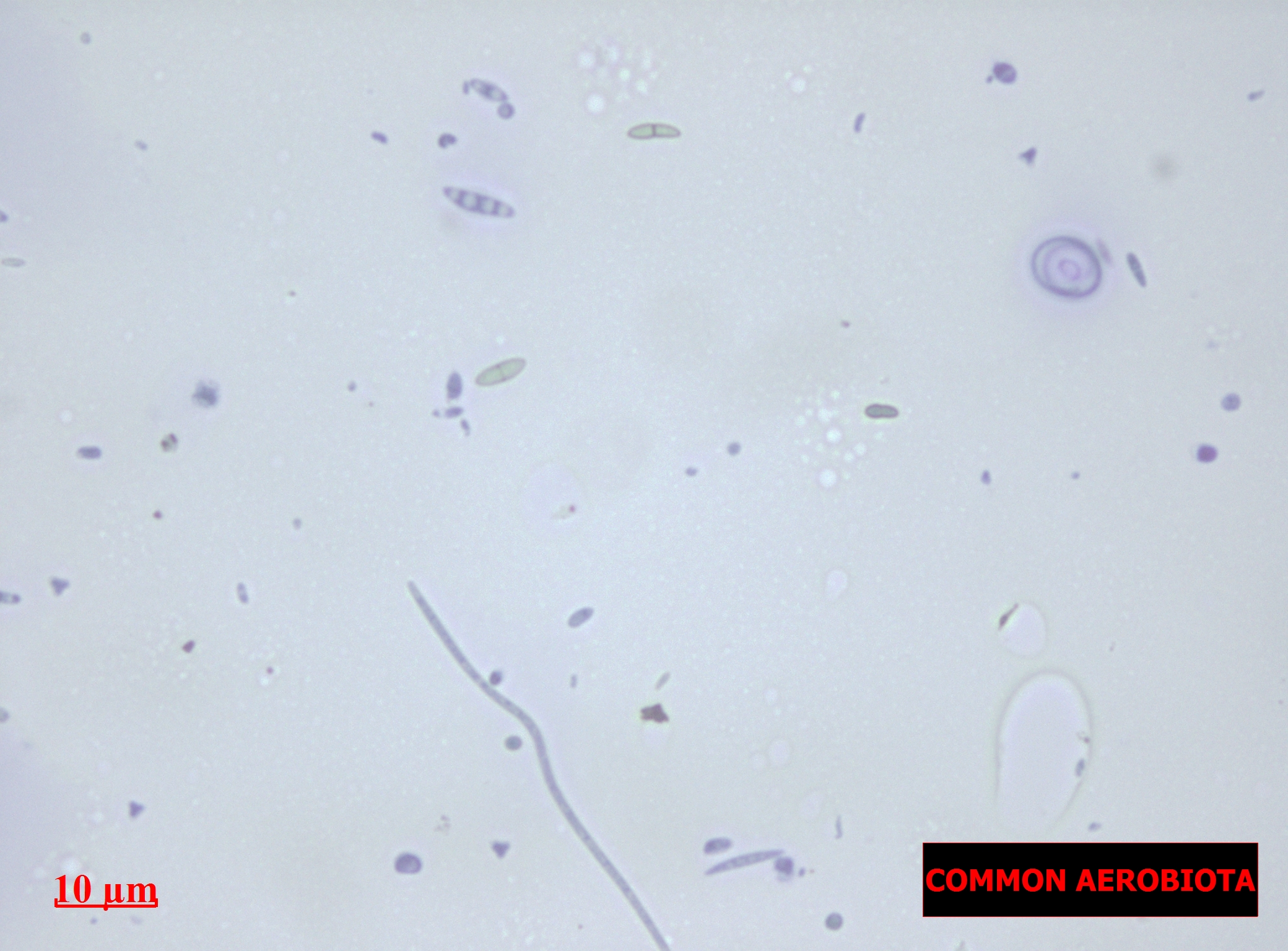
Some common air-borne spores

Aerobiology (from Greek ἀήρ, aēr, "air"; βίος, bios, "life"; and -λογία, -logia) is a branch of biology that studies the passive transport of organic particles, such as bacteria, fungal spores, very small insects, pollen grains and viruses.

Aerobiologists have traditionally been involved in the measurement and reporting of airborne pollen and fungal spores as a service to those with allergies. However, aerobiology is a varied field, relating to environmental science, plant science, meteorology, phenology, and climate change.

== Overview ==
The first mention of "aerobiology" was made by Fred Campbell Meier in the 1930s. The particles, which can be described as Aeroplankton, generally range in size from nanometers to micrometers which makes them challenging to detect.

Aerosolization is the process of small and light particles becoming suspended in moving air. Now bioaerosols, these pollen and fungal spores can be transported across an ocean, or even travel around the globe. Due to the high quantities of microbes and the ease of dispersion, Martinus Beijerinck once said "Everything is everywhere, the environment selects". This means that aeroplankton are everywhere and have been everywhere, and it solely depends on environmental factors to determine which remain. Aeroplankton are found in significant quantities even in the Atmospheric boundary layer (ABL). The effects on climate and cloud chemistry of these atmospheric populations is still under review.

NASA and other research agencies are studying how long these bioaerosols can remain afloat and how they can survive in such extreme climates. The conditions of the upper atmosphere are similar to the climate on Mars' surface, and the microbes found are helping redefine the conditions which can support life.

== Dispersal of particles ==
The process of dispersal of aerobiological particles has 3 steps: removal from source, dispersion through air, and deposition to rest. The particle geometry and environment affect all three phases, however once it is aerosolized, its fate depends on the laws of physics governing the motion of the air.

=== Removal from source ===
Pollen and spores can be blown from their surface or shaken loose. Generally the wind speed required for release is higher than average wind speed. Rain splatter can also dislodge spores. Some fungi can even be triggered by environmental factors to actively eject spores.

=== Dispersion through air ===
Once released from rest, the aeroplankton is at the mercy of the wind and physics. The settling speed of spores and pollen vary and is a major factor in dispersion; the longer the particle is floating, the longer it can be caught by a turbulent wind gust. Wind speed and direction fluctuate with time and height, so the specific path of once neighboring particles can vary significantly. The concentration of particles in the air decreases with distance from source, and the dispersion distance is most accurately modeled as a power function.

=== Deposition to rest ===
Deposition is a combination of gravity and inertia. The fall speed for small particles can be calculated by mass and geometry, but the complex shapes of pollen and spores often fall slower than their estimated speed modeled with simple shapes. Spores can also be removed from the air from impact; the inertia of the particles will cause them to hit surfaces along their path, instead of flowing around them like air.

== Experimental methods ==
There have been many studies performed to understand real-life dispersal patterns of pollen and spores. To collect samples, studies often use a volumetric spore trap such as a Hirst-type sampler. Particles stick to a sampling strip and then can be inspected under a microscope. Scientists have to count the particles under magnification, and then analyze sample DNA by Amplicon sequence variant (ASV) or another common method.

A challenge repeatedly cited in literature is that because of differing testing or analysis methodologies, results are not always comparable across studies. Therefore, extensive data collection must be performed in each study to get an accurate model. Unfortunately there is no database of aerobiological particle distribution to compare results to.

== Effects on human health ==
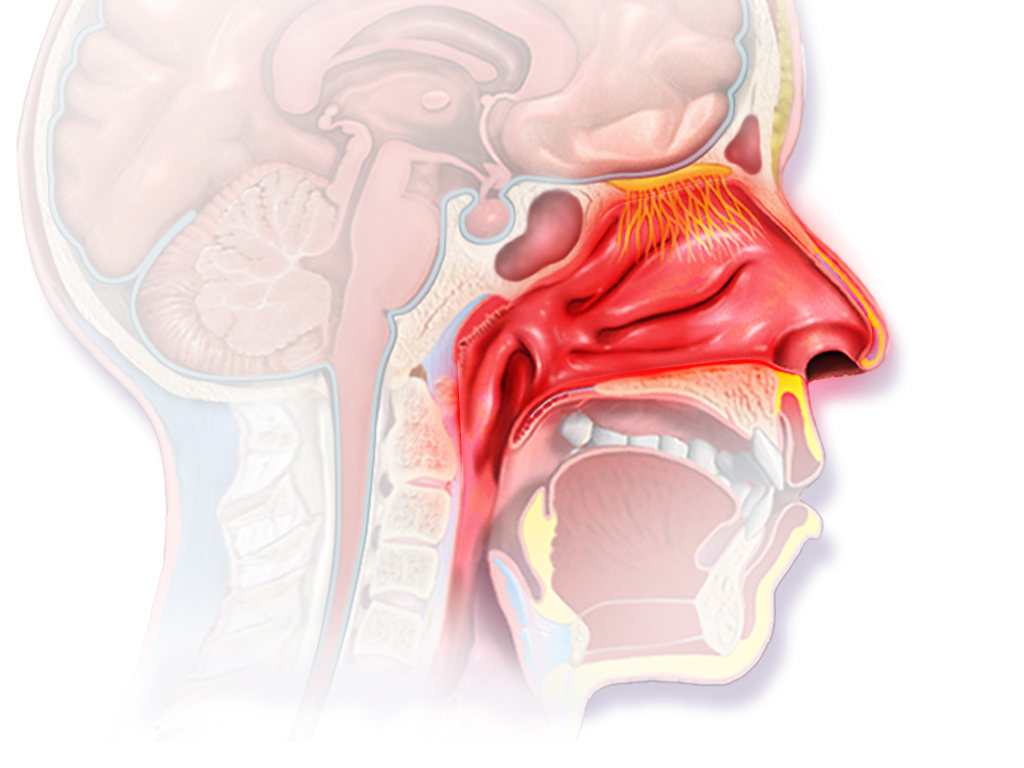
Illustration depicting inflammation associated with allergic rhinitis.

Allergic rhinitis is a type of inflammation in the nose that occurs when the immune system overreacts to allergens in the air. It is typically triggered in humans by pollen and other bioaerosols. Between 10% and 30% of people in Western countries are affected. Symptoms are usually worse during pollination periods, when there is significantly more pollen aerosolized in the air. In these peak periods, staying indoors is one way to limit exposure. However, studies have shown that there are still significant levels of pollen indoors. In the winter, pollen levels indoors actually exceed outdoor levels.

Up to date data on pollen levels is critical for humans that have allergies. A current limitation is that many spore traps require scientists to identify and count individual pollen grains under magnification. This causes data to be delayed, sometimes by over a week. There are currently a number of fully automatic spore traps in development, and once they are fully functional they will improve the lives of people with allergies.

== Effects of climate change ==
Map of precipitation change at +2 °C of global warming

Scientists have predicted that the meteorological results of climate change will weaken pollen and spore dispersal barriers, and lead to less biological uniqueness in different regions. Precipitation increases richness (number of species) of biodiversity in regions because clouds formulate in the upper atmosphere where there is more varied biodiversity. Specifically in the Arctic, climate change has dramatically increased precipitation, and scientists have seen new microbes in the area because of it.

Rising summer temperatures and CO_{2} levels have shown to increase total amounts of pollen released by certain trees, as well as delay the start of pollen season. However, more studies are needed to see long term effects of climate change.

== See also ==
- Airborne transmission – Disease transmission by airborne particles
- Miasma theory – Obsolete medical theory about the transmission of disease through bad air
- Wells-Riley model – Model of airborne disease transmission
