= Zenker's fixative =

Zenker's fixative is a rapid-acting fixative for animal tissues. It is employed to prepare specimens of animal or vegetable tissues for microscopic study. It provides excellent fixation of nuclear chromatin, connective tissue fibers and some cytoplasmic features, but does not preserve delicate cytoplasmic organelles such as mitochondria. Helly's fixative is preferable for traditional dye staining of mitochondria. Zenker's fixative permeabilises the plasma, but not the nuclear membrane. It can therefore be used to selectively stain mitotic cells (where the nuclear membrane has dissolved) with antibodies against chromatin.

Zenker's fixative contains mercuric chloride ("corrosive sublimate"), potassium dichromate, sodium sulfate, water, and acetic acid. Fixatives containing mercuric chloride or potassium dichromate are toxic, making disposal as hazardous waste costly. Mercuric chloride can be replaced with the same weight of less toxic zinc chloride, but the resulting "zinc-Zenker" may not give the same quality of fixation as the original mixture.

This fixative is named after Konrad Zenker, a German histologist, who died in 1894 (Baker 1958).

== Stock solution ==
Zenker is usually made with 50g of mercuric chloride, 25g of potassium dichromate, 10g of sodium sulfate (decahydrate) and distilled water to complete 1000 ml.

Before use, 5 ml glacial acetic acid is added to 100 ml of the solution. Both the stock solution and the complete Zenker fixative are stable for many years.

=== Helly's fixative ===
If the glacial acetic acid is replaced by 5 ml of formalin (37–40% formaldehyde), the resulting solution is Helly's fixative, also sometimes called "formol-Zenker". Helly is stable for only a few hours because the formaldehyde and dichromate components react, producing formic acid and chromium(III) ions; the orange solution becomes greenish.

== See also ==
- Fixation (histology)
- Dorland's Medical Dictionary
