= Secondary organic aerosol =

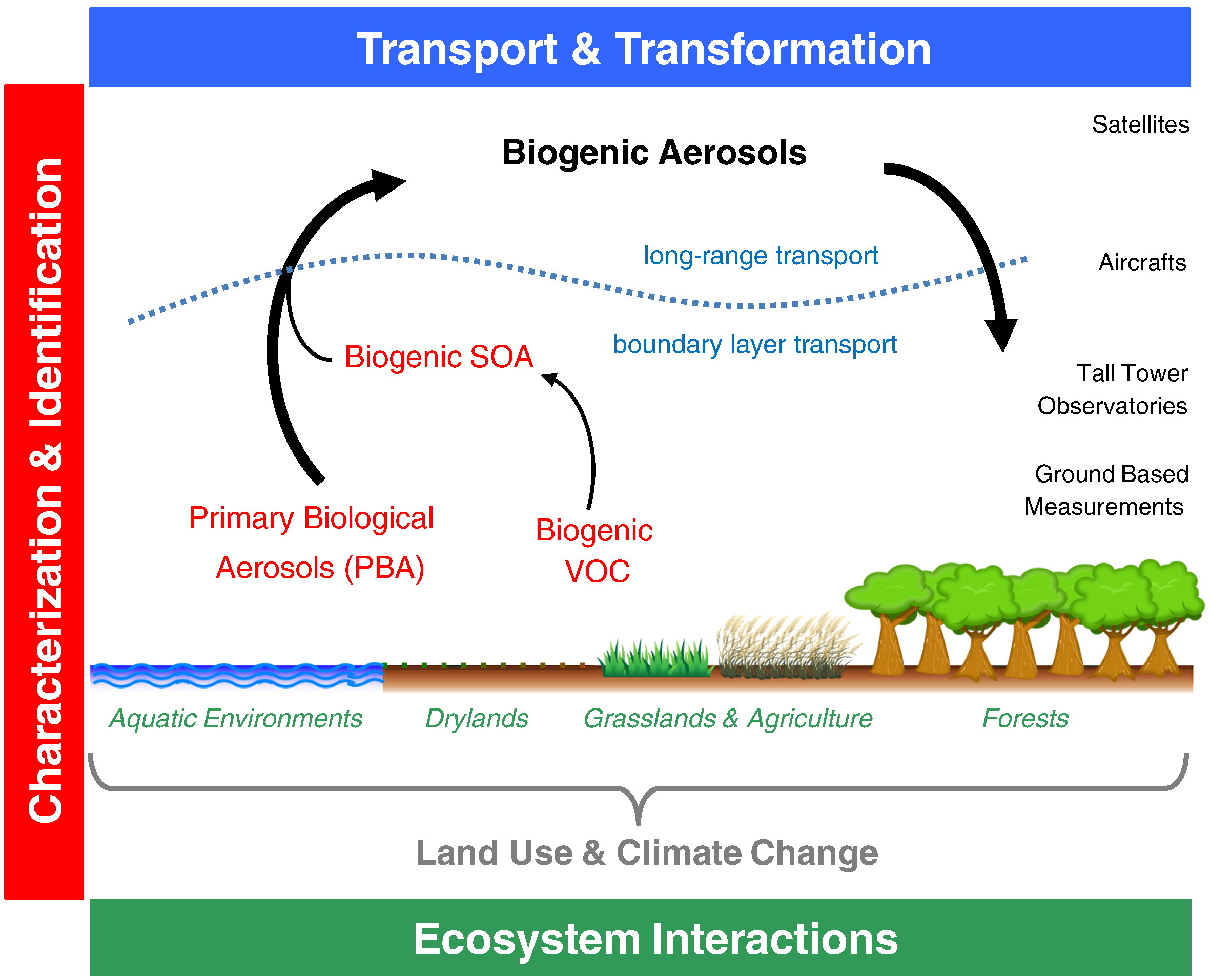
Biogenic volatile organic compounds (BVOCs) emitted by plants act as a precursor to secondary organic aerosols (SOA).

Secondary organic aerosols (SOAs) are fine particulates found in the Earth's atmosphere that can impact human health and air quality.

SOAs are formed through a series of chemical reactions between sunlight, primary organic matter and volatile organic compounds. They can be produced from both anthropogenic and biogenic sources. In contrast to primary organic aerosols, which are emitted directly from the biosphere, SOAs are either formed via homogeneous nucleation through the oxidation of gas-phase organic compounds, or through condensation on pre-existing particles. Gas-phase SOA precursor species exert high vapor pressures, meaning that they are volatile and stable in the gas-phase. Upon oxidation, the increased polarity and reduced volatility of the molecules result in a reduced vapor pressure. Eventually, the vapor pressure is sufficiently low such that the gas-phase compound partitions into the solid phase, resulting in the production of secondary organic matter (the particle phase of SOAs). SOAs represent a significant sum of aerosols contained in the troposphere.

== Human Health and Environmental Impacts ==
A large sum of fine particulates (PM2.5) are accounted for by SOAs. These fine particles are small enough to penetrate deep into the lungs, causing various respiratory health effects.

SOAs can have significant impacts on the Earth's energy balance. Through their role in the scattering and absorption of solar radiation, heterogenous chemistry and cloud formation, these aerosols can significantly enhance radiative forcing. Reduced visibility, worsened air quality and haze formation all result from enhanced SOA production. Additionally, SOA formation can impact ecosystems through the key role they play in the chemistry of the troposphere for carbon monoxide production, methane oxidation and ozone dynamics.

== SOA Formation ==
=== Gas Particle Partitioning ===
Organic compounds can partition from the gas phase to the particle phase. This process can be described by the gas particle partitioning coefficient, $K_i$. This coefficient depends on various inputs including the vapor pressure, the activity coefficient in the particle phase, the surrounding temperature, the liquid vapor pressure of the particle that is partitioning, the weight of the absorbing particle and the total fraction of particle mass into which organic components can partition. However, the vapor pressures and activity coefficients of many aerosols are unknown, making it impossible to describe the formation of SOAs for any species by this relation alone. Simplification of mixing states and reaction mechanisms through the SOA yield equation can combat this, allowing for the parameterization of SOA precursor gases.

=== Mixing States ===
SOAs have complex mixing states, meaning that often, one SOA particle formed from a single precursor can consist of hundreds of different compounds. It can be difficult to fundamentally describe the formation of SOAs as a result of the complexity of these mixing states, so these mixing states are often simplified through SOA parameterization. It has been shown in recent years that model estimates made with these simplified regimes often underestimate SOA mass in the atmosphere. This may be a result of unknown reaction mechanisms, unknown precursors or a misunderstanding of SOA lifetime.

== Role of Volatile Organic Compounds in SOA Production ==
Volatile organic compounds are oxidized by the hydroxyl radical during the day and by nitrate radicals at night. The oxidation of these compounds can lead to the formation of hundreds of oxidation products. Oxidation products that have sufficiently low vapor pressures can condense onto aerosols. SOAs can dominate organic particle mass when rapid VOC oxidation occurs in regions that exhibit favorable conditions, such as high photolysis rates or high concentrations of oxidants.

=== Biogenic SOAs ===
Biogenic volatile organic compounds emitted by plants serve as a significant SOA precursor. The biogenic VOC isoprene accounts for a large amount of reactivity with the predominant oxidizing agent, the hydroxyl radical. As such, isoprene oxidation accounts for a notable sum of SOA formation. The amount of SOA produced through isoprene oxidation is largely dependent on environmental factors that influence oxidation regimes. It has been shown that SOA yield from isoprene oxidation is largely related to NOx concentrations. Additionally, higher acidity in aerosols can increase the amount of SOA formed from isoprene oxidation.

Dimethyl sulfide emitted by marine phytoplankton represents another significant SOA source. The oxidation of dimethyl sulfide produces sulfur dioxide, and subsequently, sulfuric acid, which then either condenses onto particles already present in the atmosphere, or forms new secondary particles.

=== Anthropogenic SOAs ===
Anthropogenically emitted volatile organic compounds, such as aromatics from fossil fuel combustion, can be oxidized to form SOAs.
