= Micro-incineration =

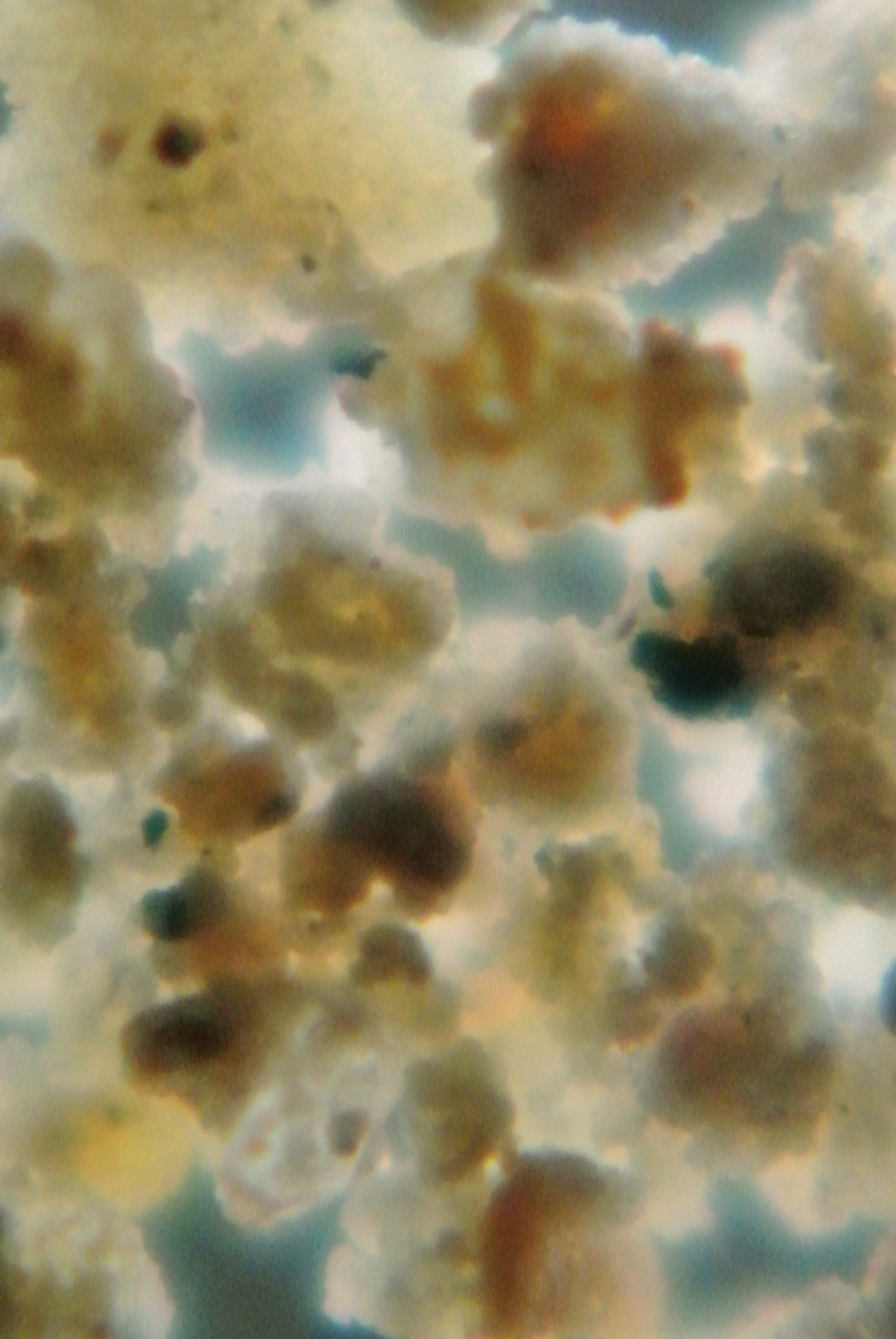
Micro-particles of ashes from the incineration of municipal solid waste.

Micro-incineration or microincineration is a technique to determine the manner and distribution of mineral elements in biological cells, biological tissues and organs. Slide preparation of tissues can be used. Examples include calcium (Ca), potassium (K), sodium (Na), magnesium (Mg), iron (Fe), and silicon (Si). The early known figure who discovered besides describing of this incineration was Raspail, a Frenchman who worked as a chemistry during his discovery in 1833.

The organic matter is vaporised by heating. The nature and position of the mineral ash is determined microscopically. Aqueous or cryo-EM fixed tissue materials can also be examined under transmission and scanning electron microscopy (TEM & SEM).

The ashing procedure produces cellular oxidised-residues rich in Na_{2}O, CaO, MgO, Fe_{2}O_{3}, SiO_{2}, Ca(PO_{4})_{2}, Mg(PO_{4})_{2}, etc., which are detected by X-ray microanalysis with 2-4 times sensitivity gained after incineration of sample, due to increased mineral concentration and reduced nonspecific background radiation.
