= M115 (disambiguation) =

M115, M1 15 or M-115 may refer to:

- M115 203 mm howitzer, a towed howitzer used by the United States Army
- M115 bomb, a 500-pound anti-crop biological weapon
- M-115 (Michigan highway), a state highway in Michigan
- Mercedes-Benz M115 engine
- M1 15, an electrical tram in Gothenburg, Sweden.
