= Agent Orange Act of 1991 =

Federal law in the United States

- Long title: An Act to provide for the Secretary of Veterans Affairs to obtain independent scientific review of the available scientific evidence regarding associations between diseases and exposure to dioxin and other chemical compounds in herbicides, and for other purposes.
- Acronyms (colloquial): AOA
- Nicknames: Agent Orange bill
- Enacted by: the 102nd United States Congress
- Effective: February 6, 1991

Citations
- Public law: 102-4
- Statutes at Large: 105 Stat. 11

Codification
- Titles amended: 38 U.S.C.: Veterans' Benefits
- U.S.C. sections created: 38 U.S.C. § 1116
- U.S.C. sections amended: 38 U.S.C. § 101 et seq.; 38 U.S.C. § 241; 38 U.S.C. § 1154

Legislative history
- Introduced in the House as H.R. 556 by Sonny Montgomery (D–MS) on January 17, 1991; Committee consideration by House Veterans' Affairs; Passed the House on January 29, 1991 (412-0 Roll call vote 016, via Clerk.House.gov); Passed the Senate on January 30, 1991 (99-0 Roll call vote 9, via Senate.gov, in lieu of S. 238); Signed into law by President George H. W. Bush on February 6, 1991

Agent Orange Act of 1991 establishes provisions for the National Academy of Sciences to analyze and summarize scientific evidence regarding presumptive military service exposure to defoliants, dioxins, and herbicides, better known as Agent Orange, during the Vietnam War era. The United States Statute endorses an observation of human medical conditions directly related to non-Hodgkin lymphoma, soft-tissue sarcoma, chloracne, and consistent acneform diseases for military personnel who served in the overseas Vietnamese region. The Act of Congress ratifies a medical research compilation of voluntarily contributed blood and tissue samples provided by Vietnam-era veterans serving in Southeast Asia between 1961 and 1975.

The H.R. 556 legislation was passed by the 102nd United States Congressional session and enacted into law by the 41st President of the United States George H. W. Bush on February 6, 1991.

== History ==
On March 20, 1979, President Jimmy Carter issued Proclamation 4647 acknowledging the Memorial Day week of May 28 through June 3, 1979 as Vietnam Veterans Week, 1979.

Agent Orange Study of 1979
On December 6, 1979, the 96th United States Congress passed H.R. 3892, better known as Veterans Health Programs Extension and Improvement Act of 1979. The Title 38 amendment, better known as Title III: Veterans' Administration Medical Personnel Amendments and Miscellaneous Provisions, was enacted into law by the 39th President of the United States Jimmy Carter on December 20, 1979. House Bill 3892 endorsed the United States Department of Veterans Affairs to conduct an epidemiological study concerning human exposure and the adverse health effects of dioxins and phenoxy herbicides. The persistent, bioaccumulative and toxic substances protocol was subject to approval by the Office of Technology Assessment as stated in the provisions of the H.R. 3892 legislation.

The 96th United States Senate passed bill S. 2096 sanctioning the Agent Orange study to be conducted by the United States Department of Health, Education, and Welfare. On January 2, 1980, President Jimmy Carter vetoed the Senate bill due to the repetitive purpose of the Section 307a1 provisions as stated in House bill 3892.

== See also ==
1990 Chemical Weapons Accord	Napalm
Chemical Corps	Operation Ranch Hand
Chemical Weapons Convention	Operation Rolling Thunder
Fairchild C-123 Provider	Organisation for the Prohibition of Chemical Weapons
Geneva Protocol	Paris Peace Accords
Herbicidal warfare	Project AGILE
I Corps of South Vietnam	Radiation exposure
III Corps of South Vietnam	Scorched earth
Jungle warfare	UH-1 Iroquois Utility Helicopter
Mekong Delta	United States chemical weapons program
Mobile Riverine Force	United States herbicidal warfare research

Chemistry of Defoliants and Herbicides

2,4-D	Naphthenic acid
2,4,5-T	Palmitic acid
Cacodylic acid	PCDD
Dioxin	Picloram
Diquat	TCDD

== Title 38 amendments and associated statutes ==
U.S. Congressional amendments to Title 38 regarding veterans' military benefits as related to the adverse effects of Agent Orange and exposure to dioxins.

U.S. Statutes Related to Veterans' Military Benefits

Enactment Date	Public Law	U.S. Statute	U.S. Bill	U.S. President
December 20, 1979	P.L. 96-151	93 Stat. 1092	H.R. 3892	Jimmy Carter
November 3, 1981	P.L. 97-72	95 Stat. 1047	H.R. 3499	Ronald Reagan
October 24, 1984	P.L. 98-542	98 Stat. 2725	H.R. 1961	Ronald Reagan
December 6, 1989	P.L. 101-201	103 Stat. 1795	S. 892	George H.W. Bush
December 18, 1989	P.L. 101-237	103 Stat. 2062	H.R. 901	George H.W. Bush
November 2, 1994	P.L. 103-452	108 Stat. 4783	H.R. 3313	William J. Clinton

== United States oversight of chemical weapons ==
- "Veterans: Use of Agent Orange in Vietnam" (PDF). U.S. GAO ~ CED-78-158. U.S. Government Accountability Office. August 16, 1978.
- "Veterans: Agent Orange" (PDF). U.S. GAO ~ 111614. U.S. Government Accountability Office. February 21, 1980.
- "VA'S Agent Orange Examination Program: Actions Needed To More Effectively Address Veterans' Health Concerns" (PDF). U.S. GAO ~ HRD-83-6. U.S. Government Accountability Office. October 25, 1982.
- "H.R. 1961 - Agent Orange Relief Act". Office of History, Art, & Archives. Washington, D.C.: United States House of Representatives. March 8, 1983.
- "Serum Dioxin in Vietnam-Era Veterans -- Preliminary Report". Morbidity and Mortality Weekly Report. Center for Disease Control and Prevention. July 24, 1987.
- Bush, George H.W. (May 13, 1991). "Statement on Chemical Weapons - May 13, 1991". Internet Archive. Washington, D.C.: National Archives and Records Service. p. 503.
- "Agent Orange: Persisting Problems With Communication of Ranch Hand Study Data and Results" (PDF). U.S. GAO ~ T-NSIAD-00-117. U.S. Government Accountability Office. March 15, 2000.
- "Agent Orange: Actions Needed to Improve Accuracy and Communication of Information on Testing and Storage Locations" (PDF). U.S. GAO ~ 19-24. U.S. Government Accountability Office. November 15, 2018.
- H.R. 2634 - Victims of Agent Orange Relief Act of 2011 at Congress.gov
- H.R. 326 - Victims of Agent Orange Relief Act of 2019 at Congress.gov

== Periodical bibliography ==
- "On the Agent Orange Trail". New York Times. July 5, 1979.
- "Traces of a Toxic Chemical Found in Vietnam Veterans". New York Times. December 13, 1979.
- "AGENT ORANGE STUDY WON'T BE COMPLETED UNTIL '89, V.A. SAYS". New York Times. September 1, 1982.
- Severo, Richard (September 16, 1982). "V.A. ASSAILED ON DELAYING AGENT ORANGE STUDY". New York Times.
- Lyons, Richard D. (September 25, 1984). "U.S. EMBARKS ON $100 MILLION STUDY OF AGENT ORANGE". New York Times.
- Peterson, Iver (May 19, 1986). "STUDY OF EFFECTS OF AGENT ORANGE ON VETERANS IS STALLED IN DISPUTE". New York Times.
- Schneider, Keith (August 10, 1990). "Agent Orange Study Was Obstructed, Panel Says". New York Times.
- Clymer, Adam (January 31, 1991). "Bill Passed to Aid Veterans Affected by Agent Orange". New York Times.
- Haberman, Clyde (May 11, 2014). "Agent Orange's Long Legacy, for Vietnam and Veterans". New York Times.

== Reading bibliography ==
Publications regarding Agent Orange Exposure
- "The U.S. Military and the Herbicide Program in Vietnam". Veterans and Agent Orange: Health Effects of Herbicides Used in Vietnam. Bethesda, Maryland: National Academies Press. 1994.
- Veterans and Agent Orange: Health Effects of Herbicides Used in Vietnam. Washington, D.C.: National Academies Press. January 15, 1994. ISBN 978-0309075299. OCLC 1013384268.
- Institute of Medicine (US) Committee on Blue Water Navy Vietnam Veterans and Agent Orange Exposure (June 1, 2011). Blue Water Navy Vietnam Veterans and Agent Orange Exposure. Bethesda, Maryland: National Academies Press. ISBN 9780309162470. PMID 24983057.
- Blue Water Navy Vietnam Veterans and Agent Orange Exposure. Washington, D.C.: National Academies Press. June 1, 2011. ISBN 978-0309216210. OCLC 742631788.
- "Summary". Post-Vietnam Dioxin Exposure in Agent Orange-Contaminated C-123 Aircraft. Bethesda, Maryland: National Academies Press. May 20, 2015.
- Post-Vietnam Dioxin Exposure in Agent Orange-Contaminated C-123 Aircraft. Washington, D.C.: National Academies Press. May 20, 2015. ISBN 978-0309308939. OCLC 910210790.

== Historical video archive ==
- Committee on Oversight and Government Reform (July 11, 1989). Agent Orange Studies. Internet Archive (Television production). Washington, D.C.: Cable-Satellite Public Affairs Network (C-SPAN).
- Committee on Oversight and Government Reform (June 26, 1990). Agent Orange Study. Internet Archive (Television production). Washington, D.C.: Cable-Satellite Public Affairs Network (C-SPAN).
- Mitchell, Jon (May 15, 2012). Defoliated Island Agent Orange, Okinawa And The Vietnam War (Television production). Internet Archive. Okinawa Island, Japan: Ryukyu Asahi Broadcasting. 47:59 minutes in.
- Wright, Gerry (June 28, 2019). Agent Orange Documentary (Television production). Internet Archive. Andover, Connecticut: Community Voice Channel. 39:49 minutes in.
- The Dark Shadow of Agent Orange on YouTube
