= United States herbicidal warfare research =

Herbicidal warfare research conducted by the U.S. military began during the Second World War with additional research during the Korean War. Interest among military strategists waned before a budgetary increase allowed further research during the early Vietnam War. The U.S. research culminated in the U.S. military defoliation program during the Vietnam war known as Operation Ranch Hand.

== World War II ==
The use of a chemical or biological agents to destroy Japan's rice was contemplated by the Allies during World War II. In 1945 Japan's rice crop was terribly affected by rice blast disease. The outbreak as well as another in Germany's potato crop coincided with covert Allied research in these areas. The timing of these outbreaks generated persistent speculation of some connection between the events however the rumors were never proven and the outbreaks could have been naturally occurring.

A U.S. War Departments report notes that "in addition to the results of human experimentation much data is available from the Japanese experiments on animals and food crops".

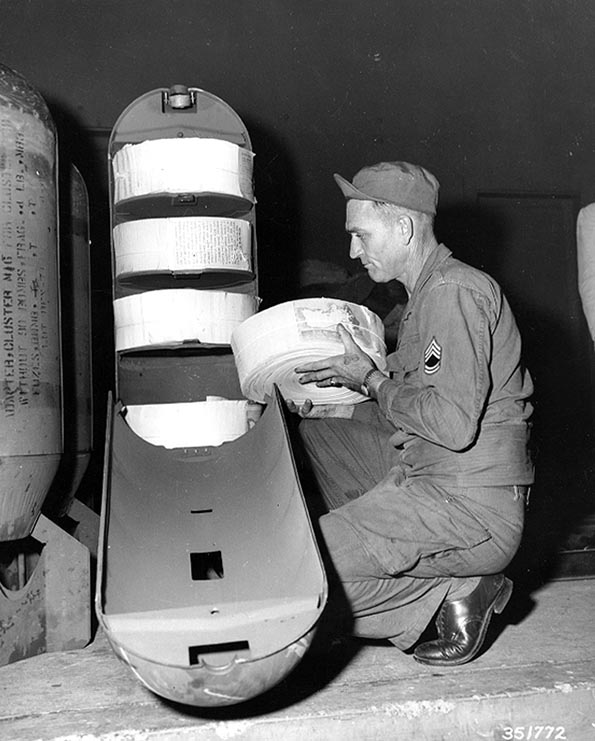
M16M1 cluster adapter is loaded with airborne leaflet propaganda at the Far Eastern Command Printing Plant, Yokohama, Japan. November 1, 1950. Adapted from the leaflet bomb casing design, the M115 anti-crop bomb, also known as the feather bomb or the E73 bomb, was a biological cluster bomb designed to deliver wheat stem rust (Agent TX).

== Cold War ==
In the mid-1950s, the Chemical Corps continued the search for anti-crop agents in order destroy the food and economic crops of enemy nations in wartime as part of the secret programs started during World War II. Several chemical and biological anti-crop agents were standardized. Former Professor Emeritus of Forage Crops Ecology at University of Tennessee's Department of Plant Sciences, Dr. Henry Fribourg, was an Army scientist in the mid-1950s who helped develop the most efficient dispersal techniques for anti-crop fungus spores and herbicides in labs at Ft. Detrick and in field tests in South Dakota, Texas, and Florida. Dr. Fribourg said, "The idea in those days was that the enemy's crops could be killed and this would be a much more humane way of winning a war than using atomic bombs."

However, in 1957 the Army found it had no funds to carry on the anti-crops research and the program nearly halted. Even though the anti-crop program had been phased out, the Chemical Corps continued to produce the new agent under an Industrial Preparedness Measure that permitted laboratory production of the agent to increase to limited production capability, testing the adequacy of the agent against varieties on rice found in the Orient and to determine the effectiveness of the agent by means of large scale field tests.

== Anti-crop herbicides ==
It was also found certain phenoxyacetic acids were effective at reducing the yield of crops. Olin Mathieson Chemical Corporation produced esters of these compounds for Fort Detrick's test program. By 1958 the Army adopted the chemical Butyl 2-Chloro-4-Fluorophenoxyacetate or Agent LNF, (also 4-Fluorophenoxyacetic acid or simply "KF") as a standard chemical agent effective against rice crops. Both Agent LNA (Agent GREEN) or 2,4-D and Agent LNB (Agent PINK) or 2,4,5-T or had also been standardized by the Army as anti-crop agents. In 1963 the two agents LNA and LNB were combined to make a new anti-crop Agent called LNX that was also known as Herbicide ORANGE.

=== Defoliants ===
During the Second World War limited test use of aerial spray delivery systems was employed only on several Japanese-controlled tropical islands to demarcate points for navigation and to kill dense island foliage. Despite the availability of the spray equipment, herbicide application with aerial chemical delivery systems were not systematically implemented in the Pacific theater during the war.

In addition to work done in the anti-crop theater, the screening program for chemical defoliants was greatly accelerated in the 1960s. By FY 1962 contracts for synthesis and testing of a thousand chemical defoliants were in the process of negotiation. Approximately 1600 compounds had been examined since July 1961 with the results entered in a Remington-Rand computer system. Of these 1600 compounds, 100 showed defoliant activity and 300 exhibited herbicidal effects in the primary defoliation process.

== Rice blast ==
Sufficient work had been done on Pyricularia oryzae to also warrant the organism in the BW arsenal. In March 1958 P. oryzae was classified as a standard anti-crop BW agent. It then known as anti-crop Agent LX. During this time period, Rice Blast spores were produced under contract to Charles Pfizer and Company and shipped to Fort Detrick for classification, drying and storage.

Agricultural BW doctrine was re-developed by the Air Force and Army during the early 1960s. At the outset of FY 1962 an important increase in emphasis in this field for technical advice on the conduct of the defoliation and anti-crop activities in Southeast Asia.

Both field tests and process research were maintained for the agent of rice blast disease. P. oryzae is a parasitic, spindle-shaped fungus of rice causing the destructive plant disease known as rice blast. "Rice blast disease causes lesions to form on the plant, threatening the crop, and the fungus is estimated to destroy enough rice to feed 60 million people a year." A number of strains were known to research scientists and the U.S. Army planned to use a mixture of races as the new agent.

During 1960 research on anti-crop agents proceeded at the pace dictated by the limited resources available. Field tests for stem rust of wheat and rice blast disease were begun at several states in the Midwest and South U.S. and in Okinawa with partial success and the accumulation of useful data. The research gained on rice blast fungus from the field and laboratory experiments conducted in Okinawa and Florida by Fort Detrick's Crops division, Directorate of Biological Research and Biomathematics division and Directorate of Technical Services increased the knowledge required to use this crop disease a strategic weapon of war and limit an enemy's food supply. The focus of this research was sources of inoculum and the minimum amount required to cause the disease, spore dispersal, meteorological and other conditions required for establishment of infection and disease buildup, spread, yield reduction, control measures, and the present ability to predict disease outbreak, buildup, and yield losses.

Between 1961 and 1962 U.S. documents reveal the testing of militarized rice blast agent on Okinawa was conducted over a dozen times. Rice blast fungus was disseminated on rice paddies to determine how the agent affected rice crop production. The Okinawa project test sites included Nago and Shuri and directly was associated with similar research at the Avon Park Air Force Range near Sebring, Florida, and in Texas and Louisiana. During the biological field testing for rice blast documents reveal the U.S. Army "used a midget duster to release inoculum alongside fields in Okinawa and Taiwan", and took measurements regarding the effectiveness of the agent against the rice crop.

In 1962 international research on the pathogenic races of rice blast disease was taken up as a three-year project beginning in 1963, when cooperation in scientific research was conducted in concert by the governments of the U.S. and Japan.

A new investigation to find the pathogen suitable for use against the opium poppy began in the third quarter of financial year 1962.

== Wheat stem rust ==
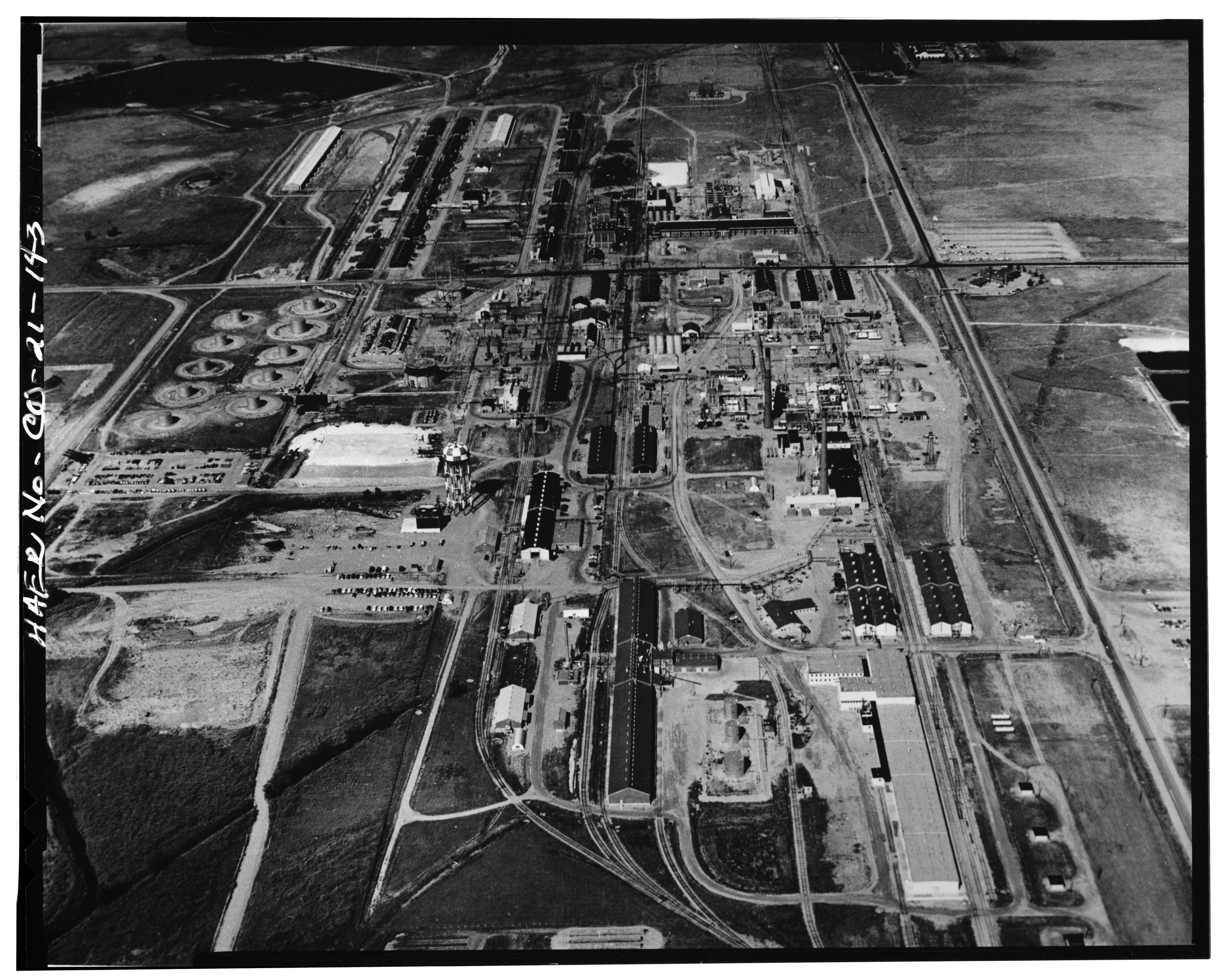
Rocky Mountain Arsenal's south plant, viewed from the east, circa 1970

Stripe rust of wheat was also under investigation, and the usual screening program for chemical anticrop agents was continued. A gradual increase in the scope of the rest of the anti-crop program accompanied this development. Large scale greenhouse experiments on stripe rust of wheat yielded considerable information on the degree of crop injury in relation to the time and number of inoculations. Rocky Mountain Arsenal, from January 1962 to October 1969, "grew, purified and militarized" the plant pathogen wheat stem rust (Puccinia graminis, var. tritici) known as Agent TX for the Air Force biological anti-crop program. Agent TX-treated grain was grown at Edgewood Arsenal and from 1962–1968 in Sections 23-26 at Rocky Mountain Arsenal The unprocessed agent was transported to Beale AFB in refrigerated trucks for purification and storage and was kept refrigerated until loaded into specialized bombs adapted from the Leaflet bombs used to deliver propaganda. The M115 anti-crop bomb, also known as the feather bomb or the E73 bomb, was a U.S. biological cluster bomb designed to deliver wheat stem rust. The deployment of the M115 represented the United States' first, though limited, anti-crop biological warfare (BW) capability.

By the mid-1970s the Central Intelligence Agency (CIA) acknowledged that it had developed and field tested methods for conducting covert attacks that could cause severe crop damage.

== Rain-making component ==
Operation Pop Eye / Motorpool / Intermediary-Compatriot was a highly classified weather modification program in Southeast Asia during 1967–1972 that was developed from research conducted on Okinawa and other locations. A report titled Rainmaking in SEASIA outlines use of lead iodide and silver iodide deployed by aircraft in a program that was developed in California at Naval Air Weapons Station China Lake and tested in Okinawa, Guam, Philippines, Texas, and Florida in a hurricane study program called Project Stormfury. The chemical weather modification program conducted from Thailand over Cambodia, Laos, and Vietnam was allegedly sponsored by Secretary of State Henry Kissinger and CIA without the authorization of Secretary of Defense Melvin Laird who had categorically denied to Congress that a program for modification of the weather for use as a tactical weapon even existed. The program was used to induce rain and extend the East Asian Monsoon season in support of U.S. government efforts related to the War in Southeast Asia.

The use of a military weather control program was related to the destruction of enemy food crops. Whether the weather modification program was related to any of the CBW programs is not documented. However, it is certain that some of the military herbicides used in Vietnam required rainfall to be absorbed. In theory, any CBW program using mosquitoes or fungus would have also benefited from prolonged periods of rain. Rice blast sporulation on diseased leaves occurs when relative humidity approaches 100%. Laboratory measurements indicate sporulation increases with the length of time 100% relative humidity prevails.
