= Business Sydney =

Australian chamber of commerce

- Industry: Not for Profit
- Founded: 1825
- Headquarters: Sydney, Australia
- Area served: Sydney
- Key people: Paul Nicolaou (Executive Director)
- Website: www.businesssydney.com

Business Sydney is an advocacy group for businesses in Sydney. It is a division of Business NSW, the peak body for business in NSW.

Business Sydney's primary role is advocating, influencing and delivering policies and outcomes to drive economic growth. The organisation aims to advance Sydney as a global, competitive and liveable city.

Business Sydney is headed by its Executive Director, Paul Nicolaou. Nicolaou took up his current post as Executive Director in 2021. In 2025, The Daily Telegraph named Paul Nicolaou the 88th most powerful person in Sydney.

== History ==
Business Sydney was established in 1825 as the Sydney Chamber of Commerce and is almost as old as the NSW Legislative Council.

In 1996 or 2006 it became the Sydney Business Chamber. In 2021 Sydney Business Chamber became Business Sydney.

By February 2012, the Sydney Business Chamber represented 120 corporations. As of February 2026, Business Sydney states it has 140 members.

In 2023 Business Sydney moved offices to join Business NSW at Level 7, 8 Chifley Square, Sydney.

== Purpose and programmes ==
Business Sydney states it supports the "economic, social, and cultural growth" of Sydney.

In 2006 the Sydney Business Chamber launched the Sydney First membership offering. (Note: Not to be confused with the Sydney First reports.) Sydney First members are listed on the Business Sydney website.

Business Sydney hosts over 50 events per year and offers invitation-only membership. Sydney First members are invited to exclusive forums as well as roundtables.

== Policy views ==
=== Housing policy ===
Business Sydney advocates for increasing the number of people living in the Sydney CBD. Paul Nicolaou has called for the population to be increased from 30,000 people in postcode 2000 to around 100,000 – 200,000.

A recommendation of a report authored in collaboration with Urbis was to identify land suitable for essential worker housing. It also recommended implementing Inclusionary zoning on government land, requiring 25% to 35% on such land to be reserved for essential workers.

Nicolaou has stated Parramatta Road is an ideal candidate for more housing, however needs revitalisation. Business Sydney published a report detailing Parramatta Road options in 2023 in collaboration with Business Western Sydney and the Housing Industry Association.

=== Town Hall Square ===
Paul Nicolaou has stated the proposed Town Hall Square public space "makes little sense" for the CBD's businesses and residents. Nicolaou claimed "Demolishing the Woolworths building would tear at the commercial heart of the city at precisely the time it is needed most."

Paul Nicolaou wrote to state government ministers Yasmin Catley and John Graham to oppose the project. The Daily Telegraph printed Nicolaou's concern that the square could become a place where "vulnerable people congregate", above an AI-generated image showing protests on "Aboriginal rights, Palestine" and "homeless encampments".

The City of Sydney is considering cancelling their membership of Business Sydney given opposition to the square. An 17 August 2026, councillor Jess Miller questioned the council's membership of Business Sydney, given their purpose is a support group and solutions provider. As Business Sydney have referred to their position being based on their members' views, councillor Zann Maxwell questioned how members were consulted. Lord Mayor Clover Moore remarked "I'm sure we'd like to know if we were consulted". The council resolved (Note: Or "further information was sought".) to write to Business Sydney.

Business NSW was asked if Nicolaou's views are representative of Business Sydney members, and who was consulted, but neither were answered.

=== Glebe Island port ===
Business Sydney has criticised plans (and the associating uncertainty) to close the Glebe Island port. It is Sydney Harbour's last deep water port. Business Sydney and the Tourism & Transport Forum coordinated more than 20 peak bodies, companies and associations to form Sydney’s Working Port Coalition. Nicolaou claimed closing Glebe Island Port would disrupt Sydney's supply chains and inflate construction costs, and instead supported redeveloping Parramatta Road to deliver more housing.

=== Speed limits ===
In 2020, Business Sydney co-authored and published a report recommending a 30km/h speed limit on Oxford Street to increase safety and encourage economic activity. In 2024, Paul Nicolaou sought assurance the NSW Government would not support 30km/h as claiming it would impact commercial activity and the economy.

In July 2024, the City of Sydney's proposal for 30km/h sparked a backlash from Paul Nicolaou, who stated on behalf of Business Sydney that a 30km/h speed limit in the Sydney CBD would be "another nail in the coffin for business". Paul Nicolaou claimed "unreasonably low speed limits" risk impacting commercial life of the city.

On 10 July 2024, Business Sydney called on John Graham to urge the NSW Government to prevent the City of Sydney from changing speed limits on Sydney CBD streets from 50km/h to 40km/h, and opposed 30km/h. The next day, Chris Minns claimed 30km/h in Sydney was over the top and that "You could walk quicker than that."

In 2025, Business Sydney stated reducing the speed limit across suburban streets in New South Wales to 30km/h would create "red tape and confusion". Business Sydney opposed a New South Wales Greens proposal to reduce urban speed limits to 30km/h. Under the proposal Councils would need to apply to increase speed limits for their local government areas.

=== Transport ===
In April 2023, Business Sydney called for the State Government to ask the Greater Cities Commission (formerly the Greater Sydney Commission) to conduct a review into cycleways. Business Sydney claimed in May 2024 the "bike lane experiment is a fiasco" and in July 2024 the "share bike experiment has failed".

In May 2024, The Daily Telegraph published an opinion article by Nicolaou titled "Now is the time to tear up bike lanes blighting Sydney".

Business Sydney claims a benefit of cycling is reduced motor vehicle use, however claims more consultation is required before cycleway construction. In May 2024 Nicolaou stated "Business Sydney is all for bike lanes where it makes sense and there has been proper consultation with the business community". In September 2024 he stated one area of disagreement with Clover Moore was he didn't support new cycle lanes because he thought they were being put in the wrong spots.

In July 2024, Business Sydney stated "Business Sydney has never opposed the introduction of bike lanes or general encouragement of bike riding". In October 2024 Business Sydney stated "we really are supportive of e-bikes" in a Parliament of NSW inquiry.

Nicolaou stated in September 2024 "I think bike lanes do serve a purpose and we do need bike lanes that work efficient and effectively". In November 2024 Nicolaou suggested millions of dollars has been "blown" on "seldom used CBD bike lanes", and repeated this claim in December 2025.

In October 2022, Nicolaou called for a "two-to-three year moratorium on any new CBD cycleways", which was also supported by the New South Wales Taxi Council and Tourism Accommodation Australia (a division of the Australian Hotels Association). In April 2025 Nicolaou again called for a "moratorium on the construction of bicycle lanes in the CBD".

In April 2025, Paul Nicolou criticised City of Sydney councillor Matthew Thompson in The Daily Telegraph for his proposal of higher SUV parking fees in the Sydney CBD, claiming Sydney isn't exclusively designed for bike riders or compact cars.

In April and May 2025, The Daily Telegraph published several articles quoting Nicolaou's criticism of bike lanes. Paul Nicolaou stated in April 2025 a bike lane along King Street (Sydney CBD) might plunge the city into "even greater gridlock". Nicolaou claimed building more bike paths in the CBD was causing "chaos" and commented less cars in the city is not the right thing to do. Business Sydney claimed the two-way cycleway on King Street is a safety risk because the street is one-way for cars. Clover Moore responded to the April 14 article with "If anyone's got a “bike lane obsession", it might be the Daily Telegraph!"

Nicolaou described his advocacy on Sydney CBD cycle lanes in a September 2024 interview. He might first speak to the relevant officer for a project. If he doesn't "get any joy out of them" he seeks to speak to the council CEO, and if no joy to Clover Moore or other councillors. He stated "Well they do listen to me. Whether they then actually implement what I suggest is another matter." If he can't, "then I probably would ring up Ben Fordham or I'd get in contact with Ben English (editor of the Daily Telegraph) or one of his editors" and say "Here's an issue that you should help me advocate for through the media." Nicolaou stated Ben Fordham is a very powerful individual in Sydney and is very influential.

Nicolaou opposed the construction of the Sydney Harbour Bridge cycle ramp. He has suggested funding be redirected to reducing homelessness instead.

In May 2026, Business Sydney proposed that the NSW Government extend the L3 light rail line from Kingsford to La Perouse via Anzac Parade in order to unlock up to 50,000 new homes.

In September 2026, Business Sydney claimed "we’ve never been opposed to encouraging "active transport" and bike lanes as such" when calling for a reevaluation if the cycling network is "serving the needs" of Sydney.

== See also ==
- Economy of Sydney
- Economy of New South Wales
- Business NSW
