= Economy of New South Wales =

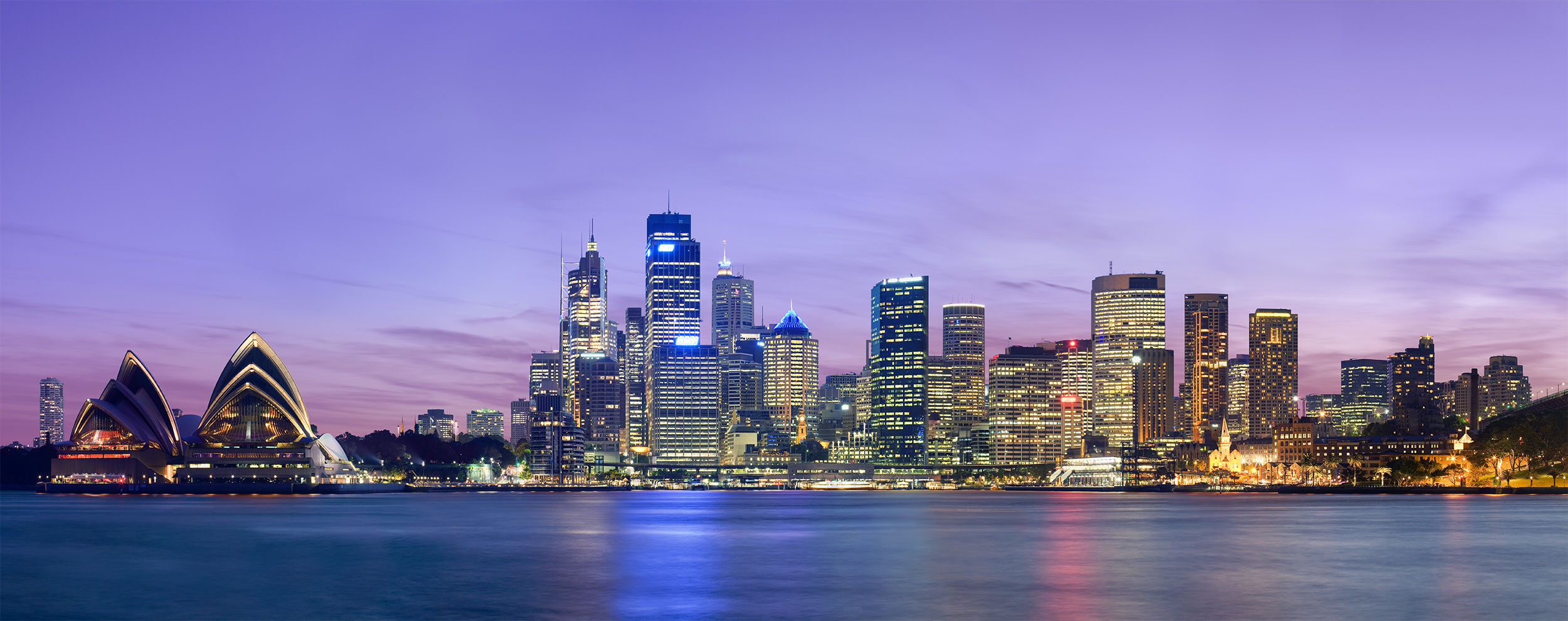
- The Sydney Opera House and CBD at dusk from Jeffrey Street, Kirribilli, in December 2008
- Currency: Australian Dollar (A$ or AUD)
- Fiscal year: 1 July - 30 June

Statistics
- GDP growth: 1.8% (2021/22)
- GDP per capita: A$81,612 (2021/22)
- Unemployment: 3.6% (August 2023)
- Main industries: Services, mining, industrial and transportation equipment, food processing, chemicals, steel

External
- Exports: A$120.3 billion (2021/22)
- Export goods: Coal, Gold, Wheat, Aluminium, Refined Petroleum, Beef, Meat (Excl. Beef), Medical Instruments, Measuring & analysing instruments, Oil-seeds & oleaginous fruits (Soft).
- Main export partners: Japan 28.7% South Korea 9.1% Taiwan 7.8% China 5.9% United States 5%
- Imports: A$187.1 billion (2021/22)
- Import goods: Telecom equipment & parts, Refined petroleum, Computers, Medicaments (incl veterinary), Goods vehicles
- Main import partners: China 29.7% United States 10.5% Japan 5.0% South Korea 4.7% Germany 4.5%
- All values, unless otherwise stated, are in US dollars.

The economy of New South Wales is the largest of any state in Australia, accounting for 30.6% of Australia's GDP and valuing at A$660.6 billion in 2021–22. The economy consists primarily of the services, mining and agricultural sectors, each of which represents a significant proportion of the overall Australian economy. Should New South Wales be considered a country, it would be the 37th largest economy in the world, above countries such as Denmark, South Africa, and New Zealand. Per Capita it places 19th, beating Germany, the UAE, The United Kingdom, and New Zealand.

The New South Wales economy, driven by its educated population, contributes significantly to Australia's knowledge-based economy. NSW has 46.1% of Australia's finance and insurance industry and is also home to 42% of Australia's top 500 companies, as well as containing the overall most registered companies out of all the states.

== Economic history ==
Aboriginal Australians generally lived within a hunter-gatherer economic system. The European settlement of New South Wales began in 1788 as a convict economy, with human capital hired out to private entrepreneurs, and government and the military dominating the colony. Successive commodity booms (and busts) in whaling, sealing, wool, gold and wheat characterised the 19th century and fostered a thriving colonial capitalism.

=== Revenue ===
At the time of Federation in 1901, New South Wales was a free-trading state (as opposed to protectionist) with a broad revenue-base including income tax. The state earned more revenue than it needed to run its services. This situation reversed during World War II (1939–1945) when the Commonwealth took responsibility for the collection of income tax. Following the war, the states attempted to re-enter the income-tax field but were rebuffed by High Court rulings (Income Tax decisions).

The loss of income-tax collection meant NSW became totally dependent on Federal Government funding in order to deliver the services it was constitutionally entitled to do (e.g. health, primary/secondary education, transport). It also forced a greater reliance on indirect taxes - such as excise duty on cigarettes, alcohol, and gambling. This was challenged by an individual who argued that the constitution forbade the states from collecting taxation in this way. The High Court upheld the complaint and the Commonwealth was forced to collect these excises on behalf of the states. Since NSW expends far more than it can ever earn, it has little choice but to comply with Commonwealth demands.

== Sectors ==
=== Knowledge Economy ===
NSW has a diversified and knowledge intensive economy. In the 2012-13 Fiscal year, it accounted for:

- 46.1% of the finance and insurance industry
- 35.7% of the administrative and support services Industry
- 44% of the communications industry
- 34% of the manufacturing industry

Sydney is home to 42% of Australia's top 500 companies, and is the Asia-Pacific headquarters for over 600 multinational companies.

The state boasts a highly trained multilingual workforce, with more than half of its residents aged 15–74 tertiary qualified, and 22% of the population speaking another language than English at home.

In 2019-2023 just over 116,000 new companies registered in NSW, compared with just under 100,000 in Victoria and fewer than 50,000 in Queensland. NSW is home to more than half of Australia's fintech startups.

NSW also has the largest number of total companies registered at 786,403 compared to 630,888 in Victoria and 443,729 in Queensland.

=== Agriculture ===
Agriculture is spread throughout the eastern two-thirds of New South Wales.

Wheat is the most extensive crop in the state by hectare amounting to 39% of the continent's harvest. As such the Puccinia graminis f. sp. tritici (Pgt) strain Ug99 is a tremendous forward looking concern and Plant Health Australia, Grains Research & Development Corporation (GRDC), and the Plant Biosecurity Cooperative Research Centre have already begun preparing for its arrival. Sydney is a major port for the export of Australian wheat. DPI is concerned about foreign biotypes of wheat pathogens carrying virulence genes not yet a burden for Australians, including Ug99.

Pgt standard race 126 was the most common race here from 1929 to 1941, as it was for the whole of Australia. First detected on Tasmania in 1954, standard race 21 was the most common race by the next year in the southern part of this state, Victoria, and Tasmania.

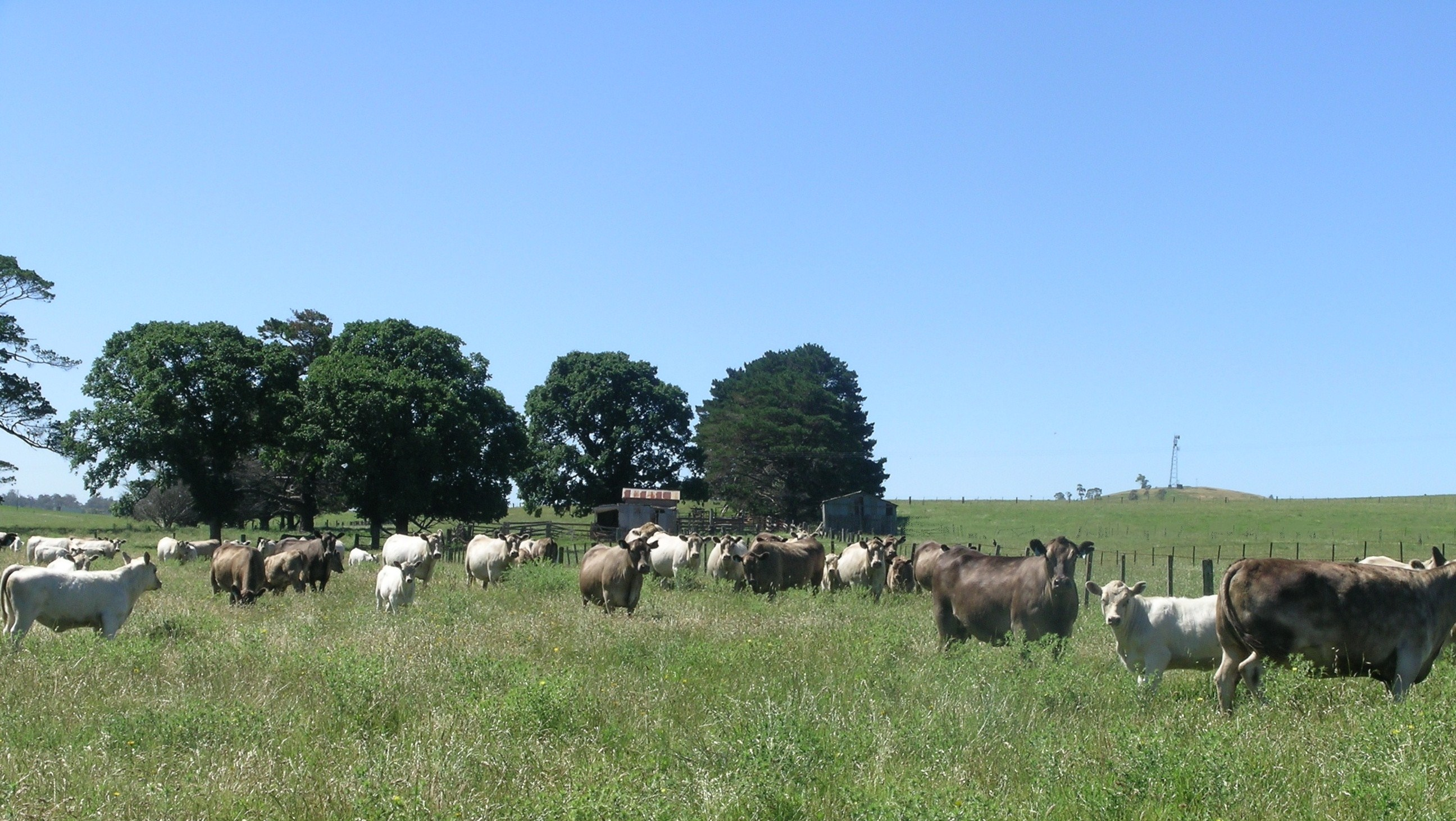
Murray Grey cows and calves

Cattle, sheep and pigs are the predominant types of livestock produced in NSW and they have been present since their importation during the earliest days of European settlement. Economically the state is the most important state in Australia, with about one-third of the country's sheep, one-fifth of its cattle, and one-third of its small number of pigs. New South Wales produces a large share of Australia's hay, fruit, legumes, lucerne, maize, nuts, wool, wheat, oats, oilseeds (about 51%), poultry, rice (about 99%), vegetables, fishing including oyster farming, and forestry including wood chips. Bananas and sugar are grown chiefly in the Clarence, Richmond and Tweed River areas. Wool is produced on the Northern Tablelands as well as prime lambs and beef cattle.

The cotton industry is centred in the Namoi Valley in northwestern New South Wales.

On the central slopes, there are many orchards, with the principal fruits grown being apples, cherries and pears. However, the fruit industry is threatened by the Queensland fruit fly (Bactrocera tryoni) which causes more than $28.5 million a year in damage to Australian crops, primarily in Queensland and northern New South Wales.

Approximately 40,200 hectares (99,000 acres) of vineyards lie across the eastern region of the state with wines produced in the Hunter Valley with the Riverina being the largest wine producer in New South Wales. Australia's largest and most valuable Thoroughbred horse breeding area is centred on Scone in the Hunter Valley. Powdery Mildew (Erysiphe necator, syn. Uncinula necator), Downy Mildew (Plasmopara viticola), and Gray Mold (Botrytis cinerea) are common fungal diseases of grape here. Fungicides are commonly used in this crop and so fungicide resistance and resistance management are a concern. DPI provides recommendations on these and other topics for producers.

As with the entire world, the most popular rodenticide is warfarin although some warfarin resistance is found here. DPI recommends rodenticides including alternatives for resistant targets.

About half of Australia's timber production is in New South Wales. Large areas of the state are now being replanted with eucalyptus forests

Under the Water Management Act 2000, updated riparian water rights were given to those within NSW with livestock. Under the Act, "an owner or occupier of a landholding is entitled to take water from a river, estuary or lake which fronts their land or from an aquifer which is underlying their land for domestic consumption and stock watering without the need for an access licence."

40% of Australia's lucerne (Medicago sativa, alfalfa) is grown here. Due to the introduction of the spotted alfalfa aphid (Therioaphis maculata) in the 1700s all varieties grown here must be resistant to it (see also Lucerne § Varieties).

The Flow Hive was invented here and the company is operated here.

In the late 1970s, drug resistance had become so severe that the government convened a committee to advise them. The Stock Medicines Board formed a committee from University of New England, CSIRO, the Agriculture Department, University of Sydney, and the Victoria Department of Agriculture. The state's stations are so numerous – and modern drugs so vital to modern production – that anthelminthic resistance in livestock parasites of sheep, goats, and horses had become widespread. (In fact the first known example of any anthelminthic resistance in the country was against thiabendazole (TBZ) in Haemonchus contortus of sheep in the Northern Tablelands, reported by Smeal et al., 1968.) The committee found that by the late '70s bendazole resistances were common in H. contortus, Trichostrongylus colubriformis, and Ostertagia circumcincta spp. of sheep and Strongylidae spp. of horse. They advised that resistance would continue to develop and could not be avoided, and so resistance management would be a constant companion for the industry in the future.

== Future Investment ==
In 2021 the government department 'Investment NSW' was created with the purpose to:

- Boost research and development
- foster start-ups and innovations
- Grow priority sectors and precincts
- Attract global talent and investment
- Export to the world

As of September 2023, Investment NSW lists priority sectors as:

- Manufacturing
- Agrifood
- Clean Economy
- Technology
- Health and life sciences
- Defence and aerospace
- International students

The 2023-24 NSW budget shows a commitment to continued investment into essential services, Education, Transport infrastructure. Along with a major focus on reducing state debt after a major increase from 2019 due to the COVID-19 pandemic.

== Exports ==
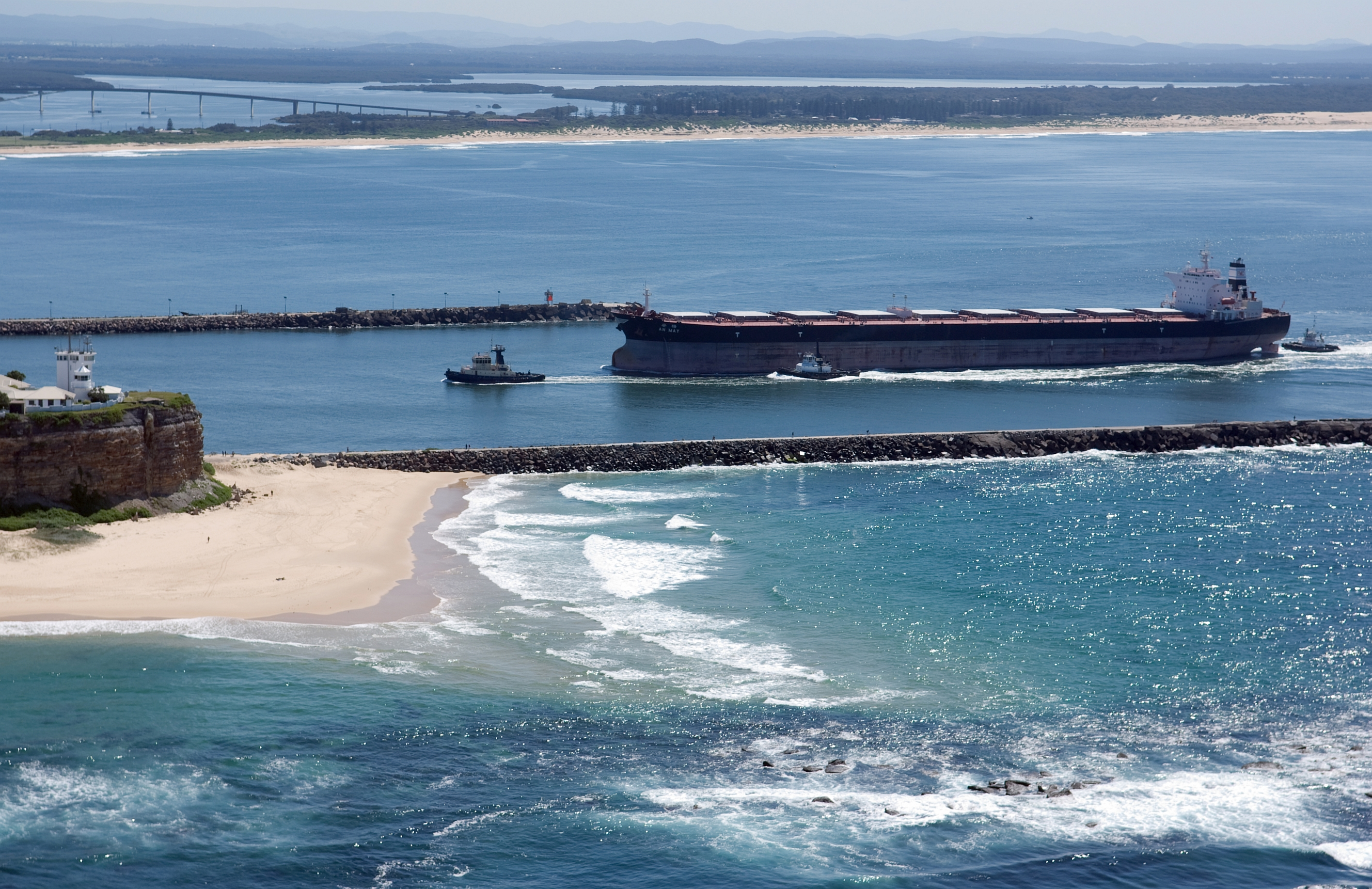
A bulk carrier entering the Port of Newcastle, New South Wales, 2009

In 2021–22, NSW recorded A$31.1 billion or 51% of Australia's total services exports.

In 2021–22, total goods and services exports from NSW amounted to $120.3 billion, with the five largest exports being:

- Coal: A$41.5 Billion
- Education-Related Travel: A$7.5 Billion
- Computer & Information Services: A$5.1 Billion
- Professional & Management Consulting Services: A$4.44 Billion
- Gold: A$4.42 Billion

NSW goods exports for 2021-22 were worth A$89.2 billion, while services exports were worth A$31.1 billion. While goods imports for the same time period were worth A$150.9 billion, and services imports worth A$36.1 billion. Meaning in 2021-22 NSW imported A$66.7 billion more in total than it exported. This total accounts for 20.2% of total Australian exports, and 40.6% of Australian imports.

== See also ==
- Economy of Sydney
- Economy of Australia
- New South Wales wine
- Business NSW

== Data ==
| Recent Economic Indicators | 2020/21 | 2021/22 |
|---|---|---|
| Estimated Resident Population | 8,095,430 | 8,130,115 |
| Real Gross State Product growth (%) | 2.6 | 1.8 |
| Real GSP per head growth (%) | 2.5 | 1.6 |
| GSP (current prices) (A$m) | 649,173 | 697,364 |
| Proportion of Australian GDP (%) | 31.2 | 30.2 |
| Change in real final demand (%) | 4.4 | 3.4 |
| Unemployment rate (%) | 6.1 | 5.0 |
