= Economy of Sydney =

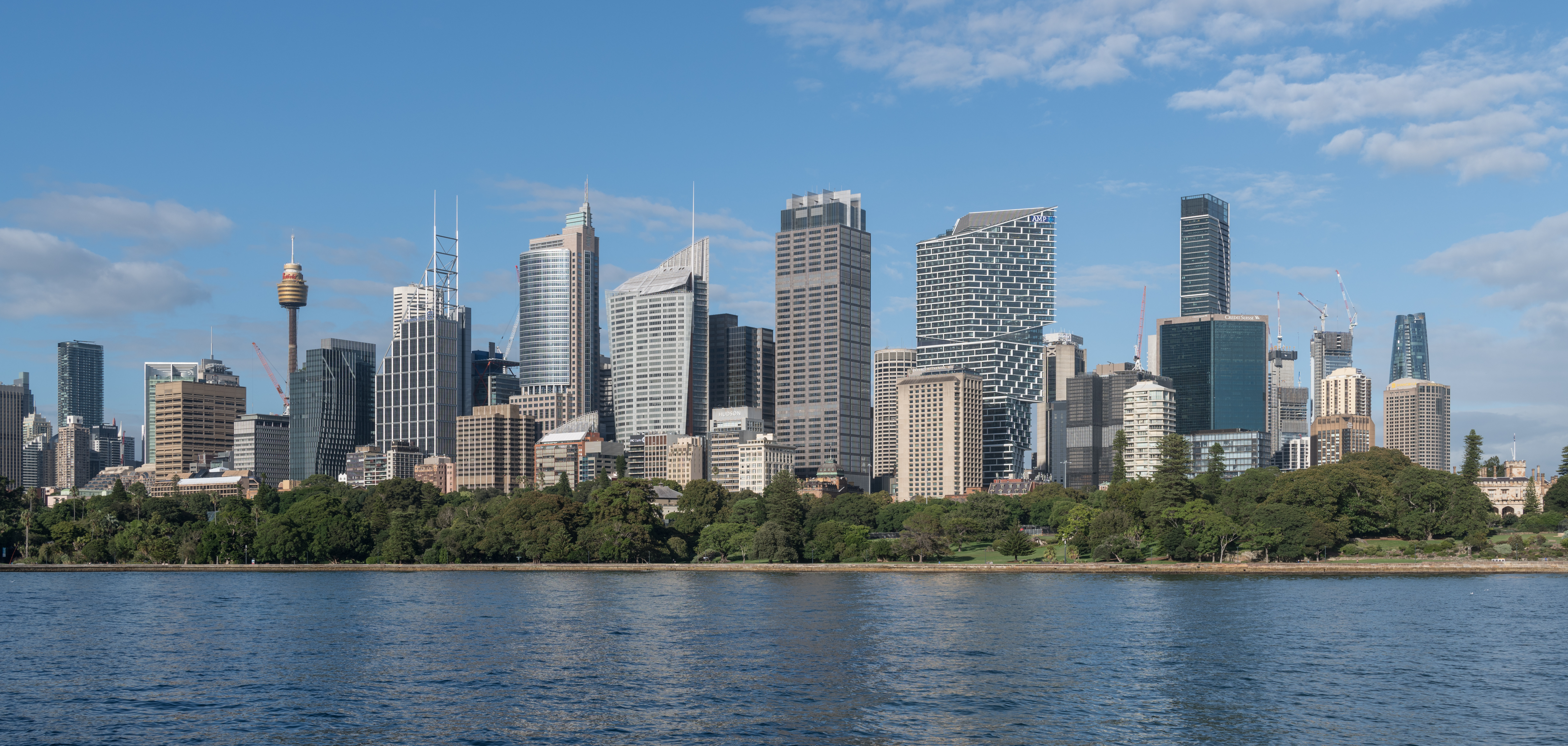
Sydney's central business district is Australia's largest financial and business services hub.

Median weekly household incomes by postal area in the 2011 census, red indicates high incomes, purple indicates low incomes. The North Shore and areas fronting Sydney Harbour tend to be more affluent, while the south is generally middle class and west is predominantly working class.

The economy of Sydney is notable for its importance in the areas of trading, manufacturing, finance, education, and distribution in Australia. Sydney has the largest economy in Australia.

Sydney's CBD is the largest in Australia and also has plenty of surrounding commercial areas which are considered part of Sydney. A notable one is Parramatta, which is bigger than some state capitals.

Sydney city extends over the harbour bridge, forming North Sydney, a continuation of the CBD. North Sydney has a large economy; however it tends to have a high vacancy rate. Just a few kilometres north of Sydney's city centre, is Sydney's fourth largest commercial area, Chatswood. Chatswood's main economy is retail and is home to many highrise buildings, with its own recognisable skyline.

== GDP ==
Sydney's nominal gross domestic product was AU$490 billion (US$368.42 billion) in 2021. In 2024, the City of Sydney local government area accounted for 6% of Australia's national GDP and produced roughly AU$156 billion (US$117.29 billion) in gross regional product.

== History ==
Although the CBD dominated the city's business and cultural life in the early days, other business/cultural districts have developed in a radial pattern since World War II. In 1945, two-thirds of all jobs in Sydney were located in the City of Sydney and surrounding inner city municipalities, but post-war suburbanisation meant that only a quarter of the workforce were located in the city, South Sydney, Leichhardt and Marrickville municipalities.

With a boom in passenger railway construction came rapid extension of the suburbs along the railway corridors to the west and south, and eventually to the North Shore, after the completion of the Harbour Bridge allowed trains to continue from North Sydney into the CBD. This radial-spoke pattern of development changed after World War II, when increasing car ownership encouraged infill development where the railways didn't run, and then further expansion around the perimeter of the city. These outer areas have mostly missed out on further rail expansion and are primarily car dependent to this day.

== Financial centre ==
Sydney is a leading financial centre in the Asia-Pacific region, housing regional headquarters for over 60% of multinational corporations with a presence in the Asia-Pacific region. The city is home to the headquarters of the Australian Securities Exchange and the Reserve Bank of Australia. It also serves as the regional headquarters for numerous multinational corporations.

== Banking industry ==
Of the 57 authorised deposit-taking banks with operations in Australia, 44 are based in Sydney.

== Tourism ==
Sydney received 8.2 million visitors in 2016, an 11.4 per cent increase from 2015. The main sources of Sydney's tourists were from north-east and south-east Asia. The Vivid Sydney festival, held annually each winter, attracted 1.7 million visitors in 2015–it is the biggest festival in Australia and one of the biggest of its kind in the world. The most visited landmark in the city is the Sydney Opera House, located at Bennelong Point, and is also the most visited landmark in Australia–the building received a $202 million renovation in 2017, known as the Renewal Project, and accommodates an average yearly audience of two million people. Tourism in Sydney generates approximately $30 billion to the state (NSW) economy each year according to 2010 statistics.

== Manufacturing ==
Sydney is the largest manufacturing hub in Australia, with the value of the city's manufacturing industry surpassing $21 billion in 2012–13, overtaking that of Melbourne ($18.9 billion)–which was formerly Australia's manufacturing heartland. Sydney's manufacturing sector consists largely of domestic-focused and high-tech manufacturing such as biotechnology, food processing and advanced electronics. Major manufacturing companies with operations in Sydney include Arnott's, Coca-Cola Amatil, Arrium, Visy, Amcor and Rheem, among many others.

The Smithfield-Wetherill Park Industrial Estate in Greater Western Sydney is the largest industrial estate in the Southern Hemisphere and is the centre of manufacturing and distribution in the region. Lying between the major population growth zones in the north-west and south-west of Sydney, the estate contains more than 1,000 manufacturing, wholesale, transport and service firms which employ more than 20,000 persons.

== Waste management ==
Waste management is an essential component of Sydney's economy and urban infrastructure. Greater Sydney's residual waste is disposed of primarily at four landfill facilities: the Lucas Heights Resource Recovery Park (Western Sydney), the Woodlawn Eco Precinct in Tarago (Northern Sydney, Northern Beaches, Inner West, Eastern Sydney, Forest District), Elizabeth Drive Landfill in Kemps Creek, and the Eastern Creek landfill in Eastern Creek.

Elizabeth Drive Landfill and Eastern Creek Landfill primarily receive non-putrescible waste generated by construction and demolition activities (with Eastern Creek also accepting FOGO waste) and are projected to close within the next five to seven years. Their closure is expected to create a shortfall of approximately two million tonnes of non-putrescible landfill capacity per year across Greater Sydney by 2031. The New South Wales Environment Protection Authority has identified the region's reliance on a small number of landfill facilities as a significant risk to the continuity of essential waste services, including the collection of red-lidded kerbside bins. Disruption to any of these facilities, whether through flooding or permanent closure, could leave Greater Sydney without sufficient residual waste-disposal capacity, resulting in large volumes of waste lacking an appropriate disposal pathway.

== Housing ==
As of December 2019, Sydney has the highest median house price of any Australian capital city at $1,142,212. According to The Economist Intelligence Unit's Worldwide cost of living survey, Sydney is the sixteenth most expensive city in the world. According to a report published by the OECD in November 2005, Australia has the most overvalued houses in the Western world, with prices 52 percent higher than that justified by rental values.

Since the 1980s Sydney's average capital growth has been growing 7.4% per year, which means that the average property prices doubled in value every decade.

== Employment ==
As of January 2022, Sydney's unemployment rate was reported as 4.8% in the 'East Metro' employment region, 6.9% in the 'South West', 5.9% in the 'Greater West', and 4.1% in the 'North and West' region.

== See also ==
- Economy of Australia
- Economy of New South Wales
- Sydney Chamber of Commerce
