= Business NSW =

Advocacy group on behalf of business interests

- Formerly: NSW Business Chamber
- Industry: Not for profit
- Founded: 1826 as the Sydney Chamber of Commerce; 1885 as Chamber of Manufactures of NSW; 1995 as Australian Business Limited; 2007 as NSW Business Chamber; 2020 as Business Australia
- Headquarters: Chifley Square, Sydney, New South Wales, Australia
- Area served: New South Wales
- Key people: Daniel Hunter (CEO)
- Products: Political advocacy
- Subsidiaries: Business Sydney, Business Illawarra, Business Western Sydney
- Website: www.businessnsw.com

Business NSW is an Australian not-for-profit membership organisation that advocates on behalf of Australian businesses. The organisation has been operating since 1826. It has formerly been known as the NSW Business Chamber (2006–2020), The Chamber of Manufactures of NSW (1885–2006) and the Sydney Chamber of Commerce (1826–1885).

== Advocacy ==
Business NSW has advocated for business interests such as by participating in the public debate on NSW workers' compensation reform. It has made submissions to the Fair Work Commission Annual Wage Review on minimum wages. It was cited in reporting about business impacts from higher fuel costs linked to global supply disruptions, alongside national measures such as a temporary halving of the fuel excise. Business NSW has supported efforts to reduce red tape for small business, in addition to developing a NSW Charter for Small Business.

Business NSW carries out surveys that assess business sentiment and issues. Their Business Conditions Survey covers operating costs, labour availability and other pressures. The organisation also undertakes Workforce Skills Surveys on issues such as difficulty hiring staff and skills shortages, including challenges faced by employers in regional areas. Findings are used in submissions to government and industry bodies.

Business NSW consults with members and the Region Advisory Committee when taking advocacy positions.

== History ==
Business NSW has undergone a number of name changes and mergers with other business organisations since its founding in 1826 when it was known as the Sydney Chamber of Commerce.

The Chamber of Manufactures of New South Wales was then established with the inaugural meeting in August 1885 at Sydney Town Hall in which the rules and regulations were adopted and Archibald Forsyth was elected its first president.

The Chamber got off to an initial slow start with its primary supporters focusing most of their efforts on tariff policy lobbying, especially in setting up a "Protection Union", in direct opposition to the "Free Traders" led by Sir Henry Parkes.

The Chamber was finally re-constituted in June 1895 at a meeting at the Hotel Australia. The Chamber abandoned the idea of partisan political lobbying and adopted a position of a non-political organisation which has continued to the present day.

In 1914, the Chamber of Manufactures of NSW set up the Manufacturers Mutual Insurance Company (now MMI). The insurance company arm was established primarily to indemnify employers against claims that might be made by their employees who were injured at work, and was in direct response to the new Workmen's Compensation Act 1910.

The Chamber continued to expand in NSW over the following years opening offices in Newcastle, Lismore, Wollongong and Ballina while pursuing possible amalgamations with other business organisations, such as the Australian Chamber of Manufactures and Employer's Federation, most of these options were explored but not acted upon.

In 1995, the Chamber of Manufactures of NSW broke its tie with MMI, selling its shares of the company and changing its name to Australian Business Limited. The sale of MMI shares made Australia Business Limited one of the most well funded business organisations in Australia.

In 2006 the State Chamber of Commerce (NSW) changed its name to the Sydney Business Chamber of Commerce, echoing the original concept of the chamber of Commerce that applied when it started in 1826. In December 2006, Australian Business Limited changed its name to NSW Business Chamber Limited to reflect the new entity emerging from this union. Following the transfer of all members into NSW Business Chamber Limited, the Sydney Chamber activities continued as the Sydney Business chamber, a division of the NSW Business Chamber.

In 2020, the NSW Business Chamber rebranded its advocacy arm to Business NSW.

=== Leadership ===
Joseph Carrozzi was appointed President of Business NSW in February 2025. Business NSW's executive leadership team is led by Chief Executive Officer Daniel Hunter and includes, Zaklina Craig as Chief People Officer, and Ben Pearce as Chief Financial Officer.

== See also ==
- Economy of New South Wales
- Economy of Australia
