= M1 15 =

Preserved tram in Sweden

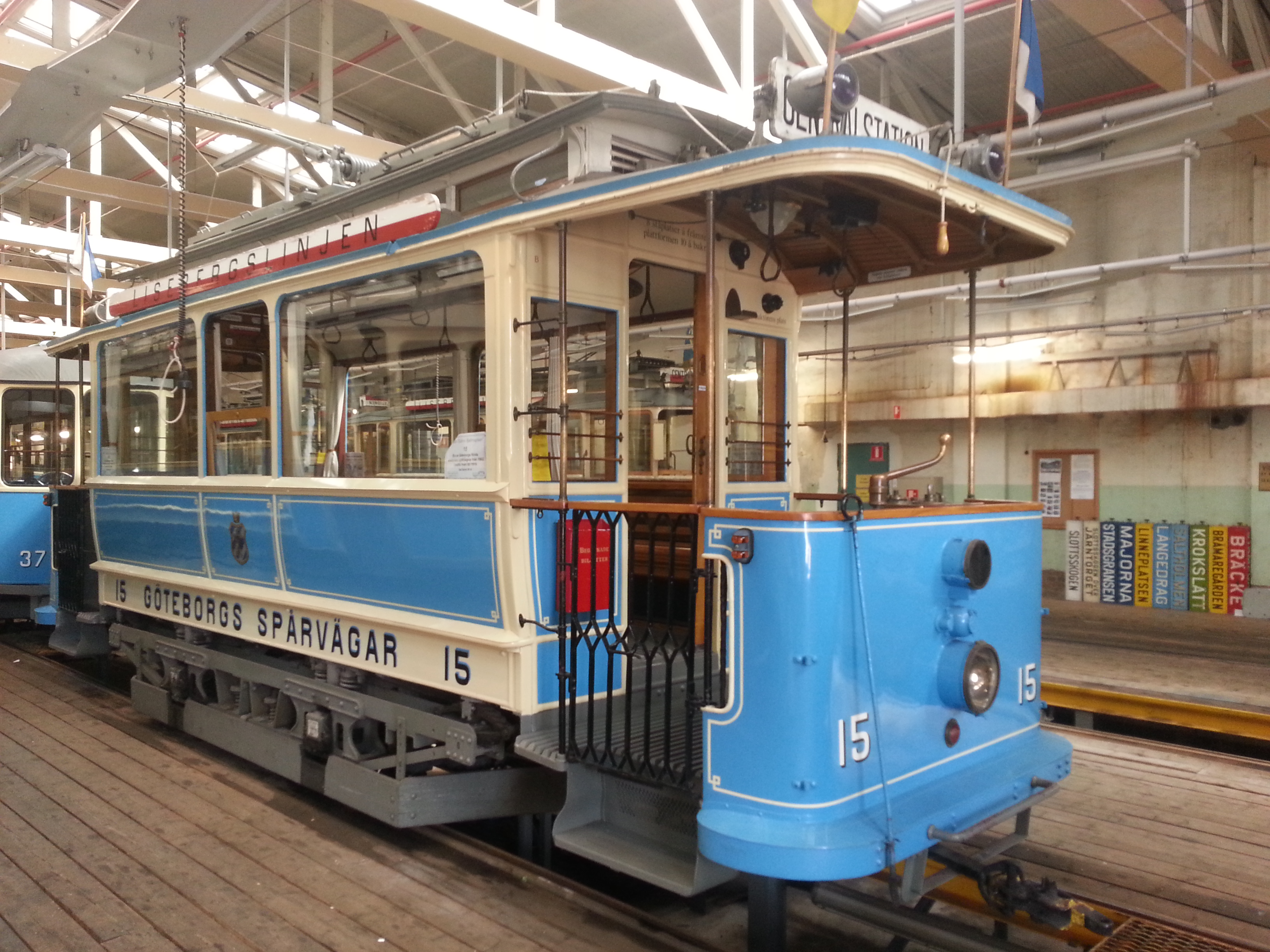
- M1 15 in Gårdahallen, Gothenburg, July 2014
- Manufacturer: ASEA
- Constructed: 1902
- Fleet numbers: 15
- Capacity: 20 (Seated); 18 (Standing)

Specifications
- Train length: 8,080 mm
- Width: 2,000 mm
- Wheelbase: 1,800 mm
- Weight: 9,300 kg
- Power output: 2 × 30 kW
- Current collector(s): Bow collector
- AAR wheel arrangement: Bo
- Wheels driven: 100%
- Track gauge: 1,435 mm (4 ft 8 1/2 in) standard gauge

The M1 15 is the oldest preserved electrical tram in Gothenburg, Sweden. It was built in 1902 by ASEA and is one of the first electrical trams in Gothenburg. The tram has been restored to the same appearance it had between 1902 and 1906.

The tram has open platforms and the cabin is equipped with ceiling lights, curtains, and long benches on the sides.

== History ==
Prior to the electrification of the Gothenburg tram network, Göteborgs Spårvägar AB ordered 46 electric trams from ASEA. These were all delivered in 1902.

Between 1912 and 1916 all M1 trams were rebuilt to M4 trams with built-in platforms. The M1 15 was rebuilt in 1914 and was used as an M4 tram for seven years. From 15 February 1921 it was used as a trailer car. It was not rebuilt, but the bow collector was lowered and the engine disengaged.

Prior to the 50th anniversary of the Gothenburg tram network in 1929 it was decided that the M1 15 should be preserved as a museal tram, and also restored to its original appearance. This was accomplished 17 September the same year, and the M1 15 was displayed with Gothenburg's only preserved horse tram on tow.

For many years the M1 15 was stored in the Saltholmen depot and was not displayed again until its 100th anniversary in 2002. In recent years the tram has been renovated by the Ringlinien Tramway Society and it is stored in the Gårdahallen depot. During the summertime the tram is running as a tourist attraction on the "Liseberg line" between the Gothenburg Central Station and Liseberg.

== Sources ==
- "Vagn M1 15" (in Swedish). Spårvägssällskapet Ringlinien. Archived from the original on 12 August 2014.
