= Ug99 =

Puccinia graminis var. Ug99

Scientific classification
- Kingdom: Fungi
- Division: Basidiomycota
- Class: Pucciniomycetes
- Order: Pucciniales
- Family: Pucciniaceae
- Genus: Puccinia
- Species: P. graminis
- Forma specialis: P. g. f. sp. tritici
- Varietas: P. g. var. Ug99

Trionomial name
- Puccinia graminis var. Ug99

Races
- see text

Virulent race of stem rust

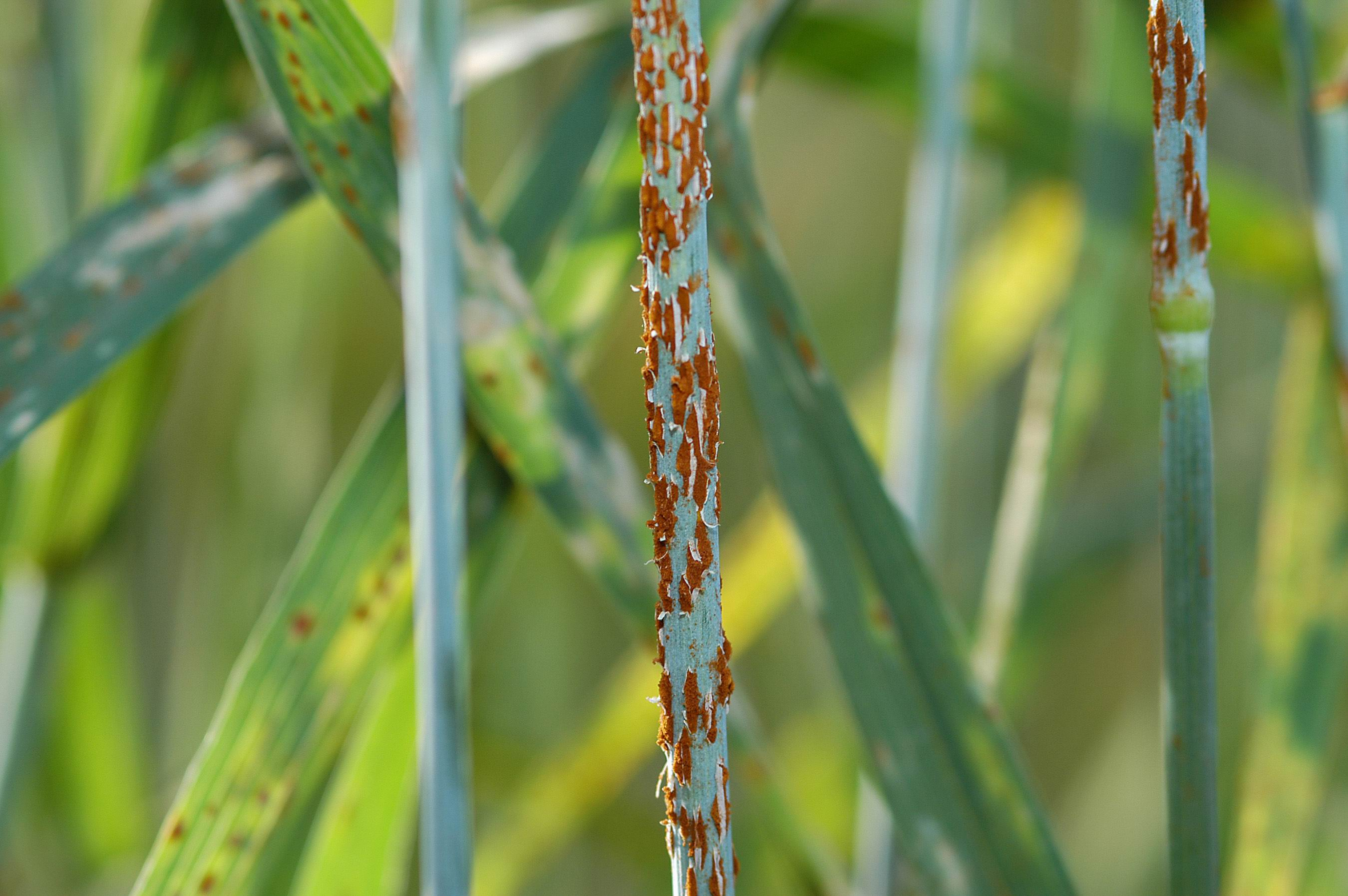
Stem rust close up

Ug99 is a lineage of wheat stem rust (Puccinia graminis f. sp. tritici), which is present in wheat fields in several countries in Africa and the Middle East and is predicted to spread rapidly through these regions and possibly further afield, potentially causing a wheat production disaster that would affect food security worldwide. In 2005 the noted green revolution pioneer Norman Borlaug brought great attention to the problem, and most subsequent efforts can be traced to his advocacy. It can cause up to 100% crop losses and is virulent against many resistance genes which have previously protected wheat against stem rust.

Although Ug99-resistant varieties of wheat do exist, a screen of 200,000 wheat varieties used in 22 African and Asian countries found that only 5–10% of the area of wheat grown in these countries consisted of varieties with adequate resistance.

The original race of Ug99, which is designated as 'TTKSK' under the North American nomenclature system, was first detected in Uganda in 1998 and first characterised in 1999 (hence the name Ug99) and has since been detected in Kenya, Ethiopia, Eritrea, Sudan, Yemen, Iran, Tanzania, Mozambique, Zimbabwe, South Africa, and Egypt. There are now 15 known races of Ug99. They are all closely related and are believed to have evolved from a common ancestor, but differ in their virulence/avirulence profiles and the countries in which they have been detected.

== Genetics ==
Ug99 is the product of a type of somatic nuclear exchange event which has not been observed in other stem rust races. During this event and thereafter the nuclei have not experienced recombination.

== Gene resistance ==
Ug99 and its variants differ from other strains of the Black Stem Rust (BSR) pathogen due to their ability to overcome resistance genes in wheat that have been durable against the BSR pathogen for decades. These resistant Sr genes, of which 50 are known, give wheat different resistances to stem rust. The virulence in Uganda was virulent against Sr31 and is specific to Ug99. The massive losses of wheat that have occurred have been devastating, but in recent years the wheat rust epidemic has been effectively controlled through selection and breeding for additional Sr genes. (In the decades since, however, Sr31-virulence has evolved in other strains in other locations. Patpour et al., 2022 finds it in Spain and Siberia.)

United States Department of Agriculture (USDA) researchers are testing genes to determine their Ug99 resistance, which will ultimately aid in the development of wheat varieties that will be able to fight off the rust. Resistance has been identified in a small number of spring wheat land races from North America – 23 out of 250 races with adult plant resistance, 27 out of 23,976 SNPs conveying APR, and only 9 races having seedling resistance. This resistance was present without the Ug99 pathogen challenge being present in NA to drive its selection. USDA has studied winter wheat land races where resistance is more probable.

In addition to the research being conducted by the USDA, The United Kingdom's Department for International Development (DFID) along with Bill & Melinda Gates Foundation, announced in February 2011 that they will be granting $40 million to a global project led by Cornell University to combat virulent strains of Ug99. The five-year grant to the Durable Rust Resistance in Wheat (DRRW) project supported attempts to identify new resistance genes as well as reproduce and distribute rust resistant wheat seeds to farmers.

There has been a continuous process of development of new resistant cultivars and failure of those cultivars. This demonstrates the need for continuous improvement.

As of 2020 modern molecular and molecular genetics techniques are identifying quantitative trait loci (QTLs), particular cellular structures, and individual R genes more efficiently than ever before. These will be needed given the continuing severe, worldwide threat Ug99 poses.

Sr35 confers resistance to all other severe Pgt races and the original Ug99. Salcedo et al., 2017 finds its Avr target, AvrSr35. Races virulent on Sr35 benefit from nonfunctionalization of AvrSr35 by insertion of a mobile element.

== Races ==
There are 15 races of Ug99, which (under the North American nomenclature system) have the designations TTKSK, TTKSF, TTKST, TTTSK, TTKSP, PTKSK, PTKST, TTKSF+, TTKTT, TTKTK, TTHSK, PTKTK, TTHST, TTKTT+, and TTHTT. They are all closely related and are believed to have evolved from a common ancestor.

=== TTKSK ===
Also known as PTKS. The first Ug99 race to be characterised. Like most Ug99 races, and unlike other stem rust varieties, it is virulent against the Sr gene Sr31; also virulent against Sr38. Avirulent against Sr24. It was found in Uganda in 1999, Kenya in 2001, Ethiopia in 2003, Sudan and Yemen in 2006, Iran in 2007, and Tanzania in 2009, Eritrea in 2012, and Rwanda and Egypt in 2014.

=== TTKSF ===
First detected in South Africa in 2000, Zimbabwe 2009, and Uganda in 2012. Avirulent on Sr31.

=== TTKST ===
Discovered in Kenya in 2006 was the first Ug99 race found to be virulent against Sr gene Sr24. TTKST is now the predominant stem rust race in Kenya. Virulent on Sr31.

=== TTTSK ===
First detected in Kenya in 2007, Tanzania in 2009, Ethiopia in 2010, Uganda in 2012, and Rwanda in 2014. Virulent on Sr31 and Sr36.

=== TTKSP ===
First detected by Visser et al., 2011 in South Africa in 2007. Avirulent on Sr31 and virulent on Sr24.

=== PTKSK ===
First detected in Ethiopia in 2007, Kenya in 2009, Yemen in 2009, and South Africa in 2017. Virulent on Sr31 and avirulent on Sr21.

=== PTKST ===
First detected in Ethiopia in 2007, Kenya in 2008, South Africa in 2009 by Visser et al., 2011, Eritrea and Mozambique and Zimbabwe in 2010. Virulent on Sr31 and Sr24, but avirulent on Sr21.

=== TTKSF+ ===
First detected in both South Africa and Zimbabwe in 2010. Virulent against Sr9h. Avirulent on Sr31 but virulent on Sr9h.

=== TTKTT ===
First detected in Kenya in 2014. Also detected in Iraq in 2019, the first such detection in the country. Found in Nepal in 2023. Virulent on Sr31, Sr24, and SrTmp.

=== TTKTK ===
First detected in Kenya, Rwanda, Uganda, Eritrea, and Egypt in 2014. Virulent on Sr31 and SrTmp.

=== TTHSK ===
First detected in Kenya in 2014. Differs from the original (TTKSK) by avirulence against Sr30. Similar to TTHST. Virulent on Sr31 but avirulent on Sr30.

=== PTKTK ===
First detected in Kenya in 2014. Differs from PTKSK by virulence against SrTmp. Differs from TTKTK by avirulence against Sr21. Virulent on Sr31 and Sr24, but avirulent on Sr21.

=== TTHST ===
First detected in Kenya in 2013. Virulent on Sr31 and Sr24, but avirulent on Sr30.

=== TTKTT+ ===
First detected in Kenya in 2019. Virulent to Sr31, Sr24, SrTmp, and Sr8155B1.

=== TTHTT ===
First detected in Kenya in 2020. Virulent to Sr31, Sr24, and SrTmp, avirulent to Sr30.

== Timeline ==
=== 1993 ===
- There is some evidence that race TTKSK may have been present in Kenya.

=== 1998 ===
- Severe stem rust infections observed in Uganda. Ug99 identified, characterised as having virulence on Sr31 and named.

=== 2000 ===
- TTKSF detected in South Africa.

=== 2001 ===
- TTKSK detected in Kenya.

=== 2003 ===
- TTKSK detected in Ethiopia.

=== 2006 ===
- TTKSK detected in Sudan and Yemen.
- TTKST, a new variant of Ug99 with virulence to Sr24, detected in Kenya.

=== 2007 ===
- TTTSK detected in Kenya.
- TTKSP detected in South Africa by Visser et al., 2011.
- PTKSK detected in Ethiopia.
- PTKST detected in Ethiopia.

=== 2008 ===
- FAO announced the presence of Ug99 in Iran.
- PTKST detected in Kenya.
- Present in Yemen.

=== 2009 ===
- TTKSK detected in Tanzania.
- TTKST detected in Tanzania.
- TTTSK detected in Tanzania.
- TTKSF detected in Zimbabwe.
- PTKSK detected in Kenya.
- PTKST detected in South Africa by Visser et al., 2011.

=== 2010 ===
- TTKST detected in Eritrea.
- PTKST detected in Eritrea.
- PTKST detected in Mozambique.
- PTKST detected in Zimbabwe.
- TTKSF+ detected in South Africa.
- TTKSF+ detected in Zimbabwe.

=== 2013 ===
- TTHST confirmed in Kenya

=== 2014 ===
- TTKTK confirmed in Egypt, Kenya, Eritrea, Rwanda, and Uganda.
- TTHSK confirmed in Kenya
- PTKTK confirmed in Kenya
- TTKTT confirmed in Kenya.
- TTKST detected in Egypt.
- TTKSK detected in Egypt.

=== 2017 ===
- PTKSK confirmed in South Africa.

=== 2019 ===
- TTKTT detected in Iraq.
- TTKTT+ confirmed in Kenya.

=== 2020 ===
- TTHTT confirmed in Kenya.

=== 2023 ===
- TTKTT confirmed in Nepal.

== Geographic spread ==
Stem rust spreads its spores easily across long distances with the help of natural air currents which makes containment difficult. Furthermore, this spread is exacerbated by natural environmental flows such as ocean and air currents. This is especially important for inter-continental, intermittent spread, such as from Eastern South Africa to Western Australia. Lagrangian coherent structures can be used to predict spore movement as they are believed to play a significant role in spore movement.

=== China ===
Although Ug99 had not reached China in 2020, other stem rust races already have, and an effort is under way to marry resistance against present races with future needs for resistance against Ug99 whenever it arrives.

=== Lebanon ===
Although Sr5, Sr21, Sr9e, Sr7b, Sr11, Sr6, Sr8a, Sr9g, Sr9b, Sr30, Sr17, Sr9a, Sr9d, Sr10, SrTmp, Sr38, and SrMcN are no longer effective in Lebanon, Sr11, Sr24, and Sr31 still are which is diagnostic for the absence of Ug99 from Lebanon.

=== Iraq ===
Detected in Iraq in 2019.

=== South Asia ===
Low-levels of TTKTT were detected in Nepal in 2023, but surveillance has not revealed any propagation in the region. As of 2013 it was the US Director of National Intelligence's assessment that Ug99 would arrive in South Asia soon, in the following few years. This was expected to cause worldwide supply disruptions because, although productivity was growing in Eastern Europe and could theoretically fill that gap, governments worldwide had shown a readiness to forbid exports.

== See also ==
- Stem rust
- Rust (fungus)
