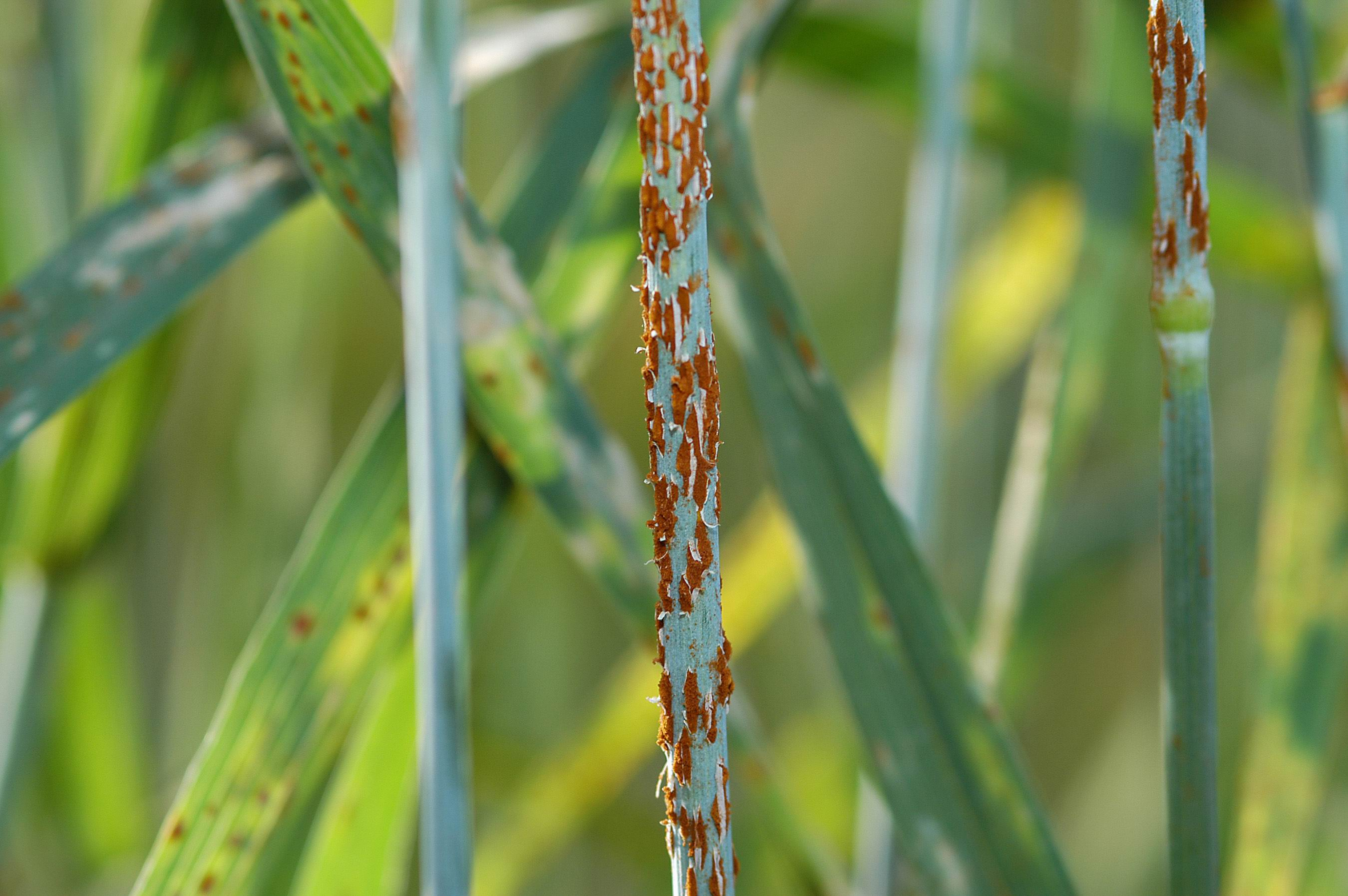

Scientific classification
- Kingdom: Fungi
- Division: Basidiomycota
- Class: Pucciniomycetes
- Order: Pucciniales
- Family: Pucciniaceae
- Genus: Puccinia
- Species: P. graminis

Binomial name
- Puccinia graminis Pers., (1794)

Synonyms
- See § Synonyms

= Stem rust =

Fungus disease of cereal crops

Stem rust, also known as cereal rust, black rust, red rust or red dust, is caused by the fungus Puccinia graminis, which causes significant disease in cereal crops. Crop species that are affected by the disease include bread wheat, durum wheat, barley and triticale. These diseases have affected cereal farming throughout history. The annual recurrence of stem rust of wheat in North Indian plains was discovered by K. C. Mehta. Since the 1950s, wheat strains bred to be resistant to stem rust have become available. Fungicides effective against stem rust are available as well.

In 1999 a new, more virulent race of stem rust was identified against which most current wheat strains show no resistance. The race was named TTKSK (e.g. isolate Ug99). An epidemic of stem rust on wheat caused by race TTKSK spread across Africa, Asia and the Middle East, causing major concern due to the large numbers of people dependent on wheat for sustenance, thus threatening global food security.

An outbreak of another virulent race of stem rust, TTTTF, took place in Sicily in 2016, suggesting that the disease is returning to Europe. Comprehensive genomic analysis of Puccinia graminis, combined with plant pathology and climate data, has pointed out the potential of the re-emergence of stem wheat rust in UK.

== History ==
The fungal ancestors of stem rust have infected grasses for millions of years and wheat crops for as long as they have been grown. According to Jim Peterson, professor of wheat breeding and genetics at Oregon State University, "Stem rust destroyed more than 20% of U.S. wheat crops several times between 1917 and 1935, and losses reached 9% twice in the 1950s," with the last U.S. outbreak in 1962 destroying 5.2% of the crop.

Stem rust has been an ongoing problem dating back to Aristotle's time (384–322 BC). An early ancient practice by the Romans was one where they would sacrifice red animals, such as foxes, dogs, and cows, to Robigus (fem. Robigo), the rust god. They would perform this ritual in the spring during a festival known as the Robigalia in hopes of the wheat crop being spared from the destruction caused by the rust. Weather records from that time have been reexamined and it has been speculated that the fall of the Roman Empire was due to a string of rainy seasons in which the rust would have been more harsh, resulting in reduced wheat harvests. Laws banning barberry were established in 1660 in Rouen, France. This was due to the fact that European farmers noticed a correlation between barberry and stem rust epidemics in wheat. The law banned the planting of barberry near wheat fields and was the first of its kind.

The parasitic nature of stem rust was discovered in the 1700s. Two Italian scientists, Fontana and Tozzetti, first explained the stem rust fungus in wheat in 1767. Italian scientist Giuseppe Maria Giovene (1753–1837), in his work Lettera al dottor Cosimo Moschettini sulla ruggine, also thoroughly studied the stem rust. Thirty years later it received its name, Puccinia graminis, by Persoon, and in 1854 brothers Louis René and Charles Tulasne discovered the characteristic five-spore stage that is known in some stem rust species. The brothers were also able to make a connection between the red (urediniospore) and black (teliospore) spores as different stages within the life cycle of the same organism, but the rest of the stages remained unknown.

Anton de Bary later conducted experiments to observe the beliefs of European farmers regarding the relationship between the rust and barberry plants, and after connecting the basidiospores of the basidia stage to barberry, he also identified that the aeciospores in the aecia stage reinfect the wheat host. Upon de Bary's discovery of all five spore stages and their need for barberry as a host, John Craigie, a Canadian pathologist, identified the function of the spermogonium in 1927.

Due to the useful nature of both barberry and wheat plants, they were eventually brought to North America by European colonists. Barberry was used for many things like making wine and jams from the berries to tool handles from the wood. Ultimately, as they did in Europe, the colonists began to notice a relationship between barberry and stem rust epidemics in wheat. Laws were enacted in many New England colonies, but as the farmers moved west, the problem with stem rust moved with them and began to spread to many areas, creating a devastating epidemic in 1916. It was not until two years later in 1918 that the United States created a program to remove barberry. The program was one that was supported by state and federal entities and was partly prompted by the threat it posed to food supplies during World War I. The "war against barberries" was waged and called upon the help of citizens through radio and newspaper advertisements, pamphlets, and fair booths asking for help from all in the attempt to rid the barberry bushes of their existence. Later, in 1975–1980, the program was reestablished under state jurisdiction. Once this happened, a federal quarantine was established against the sale of stem rust susceptible barberry in those states that were part of the program. A barberry testing program was created to ensure that only those species and varieties of barberry that are immune to stem rust will be grown in the quarantine area.

In 1969 two races not detected before in Australia were found and for decades one hypothesis was an African origin, and in 2018 DNA analysis confirmed that, specifically South African.

South Africa itself has an ongoing problem with various stem rust outbreaks which requires better response, including an indigenous breeding for resistance program.

== Taxonomy ==
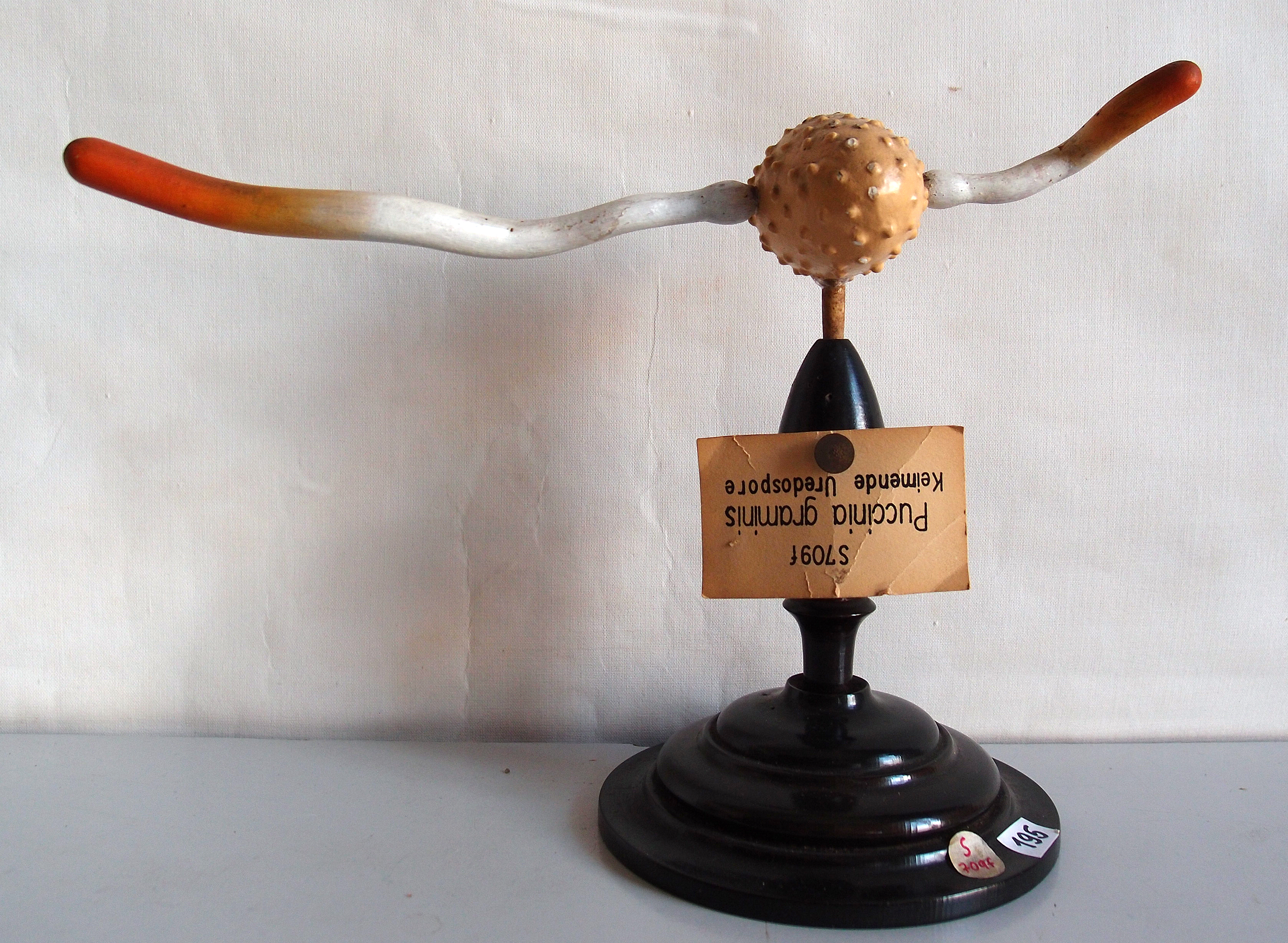
Model of a spore, late 19th century, Botanical Museum Greifswald

There is considerable genetic diversity within the species P. graminis, and several special forms, forma specialis, which vary in host range have been identified.

- Puccinia graminis f. sp. avenae, oat
- Puccinia graminis f. sp. dactylis
- Puccinia graminis f. sp. hordei, barley
- Puccinia graminis f. sp. lolii
- Puccinia graminis f. sp. poae
- Puccinia graminis f. sp. secalis, rye and barley
- Puccinia graminis f. sp. tritici / Pgt, wheat and barley

P. graminis is a member of the phylum Basidiomycota within the kingdom Fungi. The characteristic rust color on stems and leaves is typical of a general stem rust as well as any variation of this type of fungus. Different from most fungi, the rust variations have five spore stages and alternate between two hosts. Wheat is the primary host, and barberry is the alternate host.

The rust is sometimes termed "red rust" or "red dust" owing to the spores on the leaf surfaces that range from orange to dark-red in color. Later, the spores change and become dark in color, which gives rise to another common name, "black rust".

=== Puccinia graminis f. sp. tritici ===
The North American race nomenclature system was introduced in 1988 by Roelfs and Martens. This nomenclature is a series of letters each of which indicate virulence/avirulence against one resistance gene, as diagnosed by performance against a group of cultivars known to bear that gene.

==== Ug99 ====
Pgt contains many races of wheat diseases, including some of the most significant in the world. Ug99 began as a race (TTKSK) of Pgt and now has proliferated into a large number of races of its own.

The virulent new race, against which most current wheat strains show no resistance, was identified in 1999. The race was named TTKSK (e.g. isolate Ug99), named after the country where it was identified (Uganda) and the year of its discovery (1999). It spread to Kenya, then Ethiopia, Sudan and Yemen, and becomes more virulent as it spreads. An epidemic of stem rust on wheat caused by race TTKSK spread across Africa, Asia and the Middle East, causing major concern due to the large numbers of people dependent on wheat for sustenance, thus threatening global food security. In 2011, after it had spread into southern Africa, the Bill Gates Foundation donated $40 million towards research into Ug99, to be spent on critical infrastructure in Africa. Scientists are working on breeding strains of wheat that are resistant to UG99. However, wheat is grown in a broad range of environments. This means that breeding programs would have extensive work remaining to get resistance into regionally adapted germplasms even after resistance is identified. Similarly, in 2014, a Ug99 race called "Digalu" emerged and devastated the Digalu variety in Ethiopia.

==== JRCQC ====
JRCQC is a race affecting Durum in Ethiopia.

==== MCC ====
Affects barley.

==== QCC ====
Affects barley.

Successfully overwintered in Kansas in 1989/90, and in Texas and Kansas in 1990/91, and so was expected to thereafter be a permanent part of the North American Pg population. Further pathogen adaptation, resulting in widening of the host range, is expected.

===== QCCJ =====
Synonymous with QCCJB or known as QCC-2 by some classifications.

Most common Pg race in 1991 in the United States, 68% of all Pg samples, and 67% in 1990. Afflicted spring-sown barley in the northern Great Plains in 1990. Was the first barley stem rust to show up in the United States in 1991, in southern Texas in Uvalde. Thought to be responsible for rusting of wild Hordea in the Midwestern United States and Great Plains, and overall was 94% of Pgs on Hordea in 1991. 67% of QCCJ was from barley and 95% of Pg on barley was QCCJ. On wheat, QCCJ was still the most common race but only at 38% of Pg. Continues to threaten barley in the Red River Valley in North Dakota and Minnesota. Higher than normal inoculum production in South Central Oklahoma and the adjacent part of North Texas before the 1991 season resulted in an epidemic in North Central and northwestern Kansas. Virulent against barley bearing Rpg1. Down to 26% of Pgs afflicting wheat in the US in 1995, 1% in 1996, and not at all in 1997 or 1998. Not found on barley in 1997 but found again in 1998.

====== QCCJB ======
The first QCC race (since renamed QCCJ or QCCJB) was detected in the northwest Great Plains in 1988, and by 1990 was over 90% of Pgs on barley in the United States. Also afflicted wheat until a mass switch away from vulnerable cultivars resulted in complete absence in 1997 or 1998. Barley virulence is temperature-sensitive: from 18–20 °C (64–68 °F) rpg4 and Rpg5 are highly effective, but above 27 °C (81 °F) they are ineffective. Not necessarily distinguishable from QCCJ, used synonymously by some practitioners.

===== QCCS =====
Found in the US on wheat in 1997 and 1998 – but only in the West across both years. On barley in 1997 but not 1998.

==== QFCS ====
25% of Pgs on wheat in 1991. Traces found growing in northwest Illinois fields, also in 1991. 8% of all Pgs on wheat, barley, and oat in the US in 1997, and 31% in 1998. Displaced the previously dominant TPMK suddenly in 1998.

==== TPMK ====
36% of Pg samples from wheat in 1991 in the United States. Unusually severe in southern Illinois in the first week of June, and in west central Indiana, in 1991. TPMK was the worst at 69% of Pgs on wheat in 1997 in the United States – being absent only from the southern Great Plains and the west, but then was down to 10% in 1998. In the upper Great Plains it was already declining – to 26% of samples in 1997, and 12% in 1998. In the most fertile areas of the eastern US it was 96% of Pgs in 1997 but then suddenly fell to 29% in 1998. In a few other locations in the US, and overall across the US, this race declined 97–98 in favor of other races, and not because of overall Pg decline.

=== Synonyms ===
As listed by Species Fungorum;

- Aecidium berberidis Pers. ex J.F. Gmel., Syst. Nat., Edn 13 2(2): 1473 (1792)
- Aecidium berberidis var. cyathiforme Rebent., Prodr. fl. neomarch. (Berolini): 352 (1804)
- Aecidium berberidis var. cylindricum Rebent., Prodr. fl. neomarch. (Berolini): 352, tab. 3:11a-b (1804)
- Caeoma berberidis (Pers. ex J.F. Gmel.) Schltdl., Fl. berol. (Berlin) 2: 112 (1824)
- Dicaeoma anthistiriae (Barclay) Syd., Annls mycol. 20(3/4): 117 (1922)
- Dicaeoma anthoxanthi (Fuckel) Kuntze, Revis. gen. pl. (Leipzig) 3(3): 467 (1898)
- Dicaeoma graminis (Pers.) Gray, Nat. Arr. Brit. Pl. (London) 1: 542 (1821)
- Dicaeoma phlei-pratensis (Erikss. & Henn.) Kuntze, Revis. gen. pl. (Leipzig) 3(3): 470 (1898)
- Dicaeoma vilis (Arthur) Arthur, Résult. Sci. Congr. Bot. Wien 1905: 344 (1906)
- Epitea dactylidis G.H. Otth, Mitt. naturf. Ges. Bern 531-552: 88 (1864)
- Lycoperdon berberidis C.-J. Duval, in Hoppe, Bot. Taschenb.: 257 (1793)
- Puccinia albigensis Mayor, Revue Mycol., Paris 22(3): 278 (1957)
- Puccinia anthistiriae Barclay, J. Asiat. Soc. Bengal, Pt. 2, Nat. Sci. 58: 246 (1889)
- Puccinia anthoxanthi Fuckel, Jb. nassau. Ver. Naturk. 27-28: 15 (1874)
- Puccinia brizae-maximae T.S. Ramakr., Indian Phytopath. 6: 30 (1954)
- Puccinia cerealis H. Mart., Prodr. Fl. Mosq., Edn 2: 227 (1817)
- Puccinia culmorum Schumach., Enum. pl. (Kjbenhavn) 2: 233 (1801)
- Puccinia dactylidis G.H. Otth, Mitt. naturf. Ges. Bern 531-552: 88 (1864)
- Puccinia dactylidis Gäum., Ber. schweiz. bot. Ges. 55: 79 (1945)
- Puccinia elymina Miura, Flora of Manchuria and East Mongolia, III Cryptogams, Fungi (Industr. Contr. S. Manch. Rly 27): 283 (1928)
- Puccinia favargeri Mayor, Revue Mycol., Paris 22(3): 273 (1957)
- Puccinia graminis f. macrospora Baudyš, Lotos 64: 29 (1916)
- Puccinia graminis subsp. graminicola Z. Urb., Česká Mykol. 21(1): 14 (1967)
- Puccinia graminis subsp. major A.L. Guyot, Massenot & Saccas, Annales de l'École Nationale d'Agriculture de Grignon, sér. 3 5: 142 (1946)
- Puccinia graminis var. phlei-pratensis (Erikss. & Henn.) Stakman & Piem., J. Agric. Res., Washington 10: 433 (1917)
- Puccinia graminis var. stakmanii A.L. Guyot, Massenot & Saccas, Ann. Ec. Agric. Grignon 5: 145 (1946)
- Puccinia graminis var. stakmanii A.L. Guyot, Massenot & Saccas ex Z. Urb., Česká Mykol. 21(1): 14 (1967)
- Puccinia graminis var. tritici A.L. Guyot, Massenot & Saccas, Annales de l'École Nationale d'Agriculture de Grignon, sér. 3 5: 145 (1946)
- Puccinia jubata Ellis & Barthol., Erythea 4: 2 (1896)
- Puccinia linearis Röhl., Deutschl. Fl. (Frankfurt) 3(3): 132 (1813)
- Puccinia megalopotamica Speg., Anal. Mus. nac. Hist. nat. B. Aires 6: 224 (1898)
- Puccinia phlei-pratensis Erikss. & Henn., Z. PflKrankh. 4: 140 (1894)
- Puccinia vilis Arthur, Bull. Torrey bot. Club 28: 663 (1901)
- Roestelia berberidis (Pers. ex J.F. Gmel.) Gray, Nat. Arr. Brit. Pl. (London) 1: 534 (1821)
- Uredo frumenti Sowerby, Col. fig. Engl. Fung. Mushr. (London) 2(no. 13): tab. 140 (1799)

== Pathology ==
The stem rust fungus attacks the parts of the plant that are above ground. Spores that land on green wheat plants form a pustule that invades the outer layers of the stalk. Infected plants produce fewer tillers and set fewer seed, and in cases of severe infection the plant may die. Infection can reduce what is an apparently healthy crop about three weeks before harvest into a black tangle of broken stems and shriveled grains by harvest.

Stem rust of cereals causes yield losses in several ways:

- Fungus absorbs nutrients that would otherwise be used for grain development.
- Pustules break through epidermis, which disrupt the plant's control of transpiration and can lead to desiccation and infection by other fungi.
- Interference with plant vascular tissue leads to shriveled grains.
- The fungus weakens the stems, which can lead to lodging (falling over). In severe cases lodging can make mechanical harvesting impossible.

== Signs and symptoms ==
=== On wheat ===
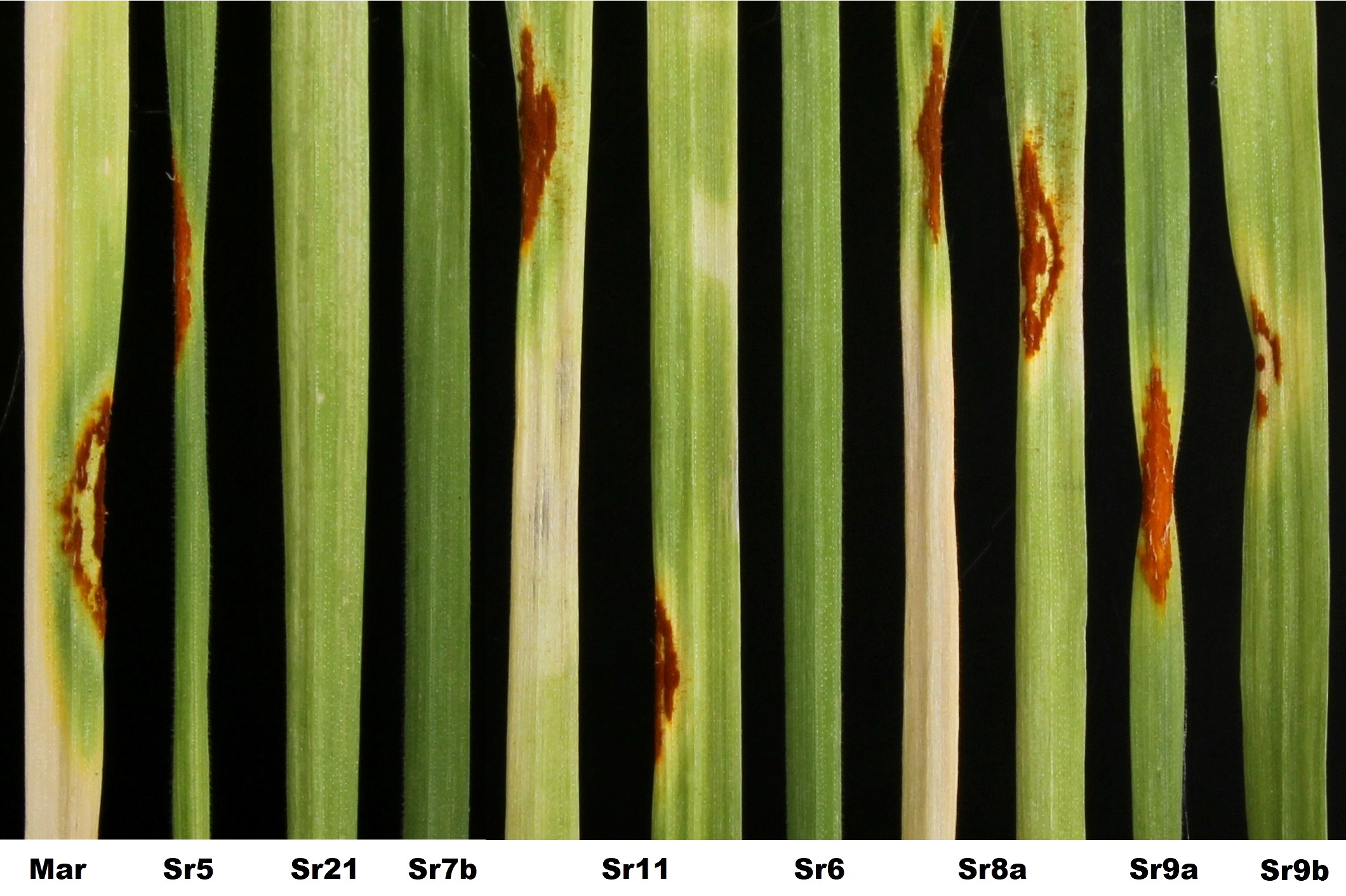
Race differential (Infected and uninfected depending on specific resistance genes)

Stem rust on wheat is characterized by the presence of uredinia on the plant, which are brick-red, elongated, blister-like pustules that are easily shaken off. They most frequently occur on the leaf sheaths, but are also found on stems, leaves, glumes and awns. On leaves they develop mostly on the underside but may penetrate to the upperside. On leaf sheaths and glumes pustules rupture the epidermis, giving a ragged appearance.

Towards the end of the growing season black telia are produced. For this reason stem rust is also known as "black rust". The telia are firmly attached to the plant tissue.

The site of infection is a visible symptom of the disease.

=== On barberry ===
Pycnia appear on barberry plants in the spring, usually in the upper leaf surfaces. They are often in small clusters and exude pycniospores in a sticky honeydew. Five to ten days later, cup-shaped structures filled with orange-yellow, powdery aeciospores break through the lower leaf surface. The aecial cups are yellow and sometimes elongate to extend up to 5 millimetres (13/64 in) from the leaf surface. So important is its role in maintenance of prevalence that since the near extermination of the alternate host from the northern Great Plains in the United States, epidemics in crops have become rare.

== Life cycle ==
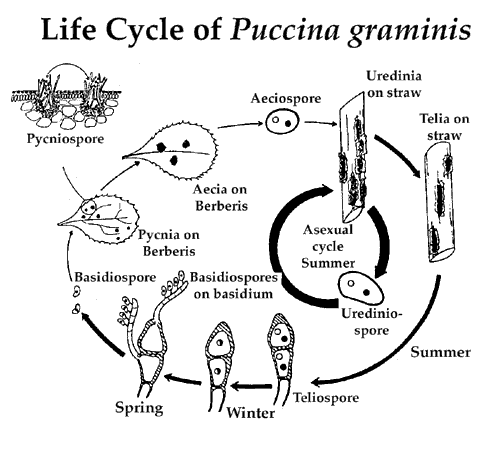

Like other Puccinia species, P. graminis is an obligate biotroph (it colonizes living plant cells) and has a complex life cycle featuring alternation of generations. The fungus is heteroecious, requiring two hosts to complete its life cycle – the cereal host and the alternate host. There are many species in Berberis and Mahonia (and their hybrid genus x Mahoberberis) that are susceptible to stem rust, but the common barberry (B. vulgaris) is considered to be the most important alternate host. P. graminis is macrocyclic (exhibits all five of the spore types that are known for rust fungi).

P. graminis can complete its life cycle either with or without barberry (the alternate host).

P. g. tritici's obligately biotrophic lifestyle involves the dramatic up-regulation of particular gene transcriptions, constituting its biotrophy genomic features. These genomic regions have parallels in other eukaryotic plant pathogens. These parallels – between these independently evolved and unrelated sets of genes – show a strong and broad pattern of convergent evolution around the plant pathogenic lifestyle.

=== Life cycle on barberry ===
Due to its cyclical nature, there is no true 'start point' for this process. Here, the production of urediniospores is arbitrarily chosen as a start point.

Urediniospores are formed in structures called uredinia, which are produced by fungal mycelia on the cereal host 1–2 weeks after infection. The urediniospores are dikaryotic (contain two un-fused, haploid nuclei in one cell) and are formed on individual stalks within the uredinium. They are spiny and brick-red. Urediniospores are the only type of spores in the rust fungus life cycle that are capable of infecting the host on which they are produced, and this is therefore referred to as the 'repeating stage' of the life cycle. It is the spread of urediniospores that allows infection to spread from one cereal plant to another. This phase can rapidly spread the infection over a wide area.

Towards the end of the cereal host's growing season, the mycelia produce structures called telia. Telia produce a type of spore called teliospores. These black, thick-walled spores are dikaryotic. They are the only form in which Puccinia graminis is able to overwinter independently of a host.

Each teliospore undergoes karyogamy (fusion of nuclei) and meiosis to form four haploid spores called basidiospores. This is an important source of genetic recombination in the life cycle. Basidiospores are thin-walled and colourless. They cannot infect the cereal host, but can infect the alternative host (barberry). They are usually carried to the alternative host by wind.

Once basidiospores arrive on a leaf of the alternative host, they germinate to produce a mycelium (which is haploid) that directly penetrates the epidermis and colonises the leaf. Once inside the leaf the mycelium produces specialised infection structures called pycnia. The pycnia produce two types of haploid gametes, the pycniospores and the receptive hyphae. The pycniospores are produced in a sticky honeydew that attracts insects. The insects carry pycniospores from one leaf to another. Splashing raindrops can also spread pycniospores. A pycniospore can fertilise a receptive hypha of the opposite mating type, leading to the production of a mycelium that is dikaryotic. This is the sexual stage of the life cycle and cross-fertilisation provides an important source of genetic recombination.

This dikaryotic mycelium then forms structures called aecia, which produce a type of dikaryotic spores called aeciospores. These have a worty appearance and are formed in chains – unlike the urediniospores that are spiny and are produced on individual stalks. The chains of aeciospores are surrounded by a bell-like enclosure of fungal cells. The aeciospores are able to germinate on the cereal host but not on the alternative host (they are produced on the alternative host, which is usually barberry). They are carried by wind to the cereal host where they germinate and the germ tubes penetrate into the plant. The fungus grows inside the plant as a dikaryotic mycelium. Within 1–2 weeks the mycelium produces uredinia and the cycle is complete.

=== Life cycle without barberry ===
Since the urediniospores are produced on the cereal host and can infect the cereal host, it is possible for the infection to pass from one year's crop to the next without infecting the alternate host (barberry). For example, infected volunteer wheat plants can serve as a bridge from one growing season to another. In other cases the fungus passes between winter wheat and spring wheat, meaning that it has a cereal host all year round. Since the urediniospores are wind dispersed, this can occur over large distances. Note that this cycle consists simply of vegetative propagation – urediniospores infect one wheat plant, leading to the production of more urediniospores that then infect other wheat plants.

== Spore dispersal ==
Puccinia graminis produces all five of the spore types that are known for rust fungi.

Spores are typically deposited close to the source, but long-distance dispersal is also well documented commonly out to hundreds of kilometres/miles. The following three categories of long-distance dispersal are known to occur:

- Extremely long-distance dispersal

This can occur unassisted (the robust nature of the spores allows them to be carried long distances in the air and then deposited by rain-scrubbing) or assisted (typically on human clothing or infected plant material that is transported between regions). This type of dispersal is rare and is very difficult to predict. This is especially known to rarely occur across thousands of km/mi from South Africa to Western Australia.

- Step-wise range expansion

This is probably the most common mode of long-distance dispersal and usually occurs within a country or region.

- Extinction and recolonisation

This occurs in areas that have unsuitable conditions for year-round survival of Puccinia graminis – typically temperate regions where hosts are absent during either the winter or summer. Spores overwinter or oversummer in another region and then recolonise when conditions are favorable.

== Wheat stem rust resistance genes ==
A number of stem rust resistance genes (Sr genes) have been identified in wheat. Some of them arose in bread wheat (e.g. Sr5 and Sr6), while others have been bred in from other wheat species (e.g. Sr21 from T. monococcum) or from other members of the tribe Triticeae (e.g. Sr31 from rye and Sr44 from Thinopyrum intermedium).

None of the Sr genes provide resistance to all races of stem rust. For instance many of them are ineffective against the Ug99 lineage. Notably Ug99 has virulence against Sr31, which was effective against all previous stem rust races. Recently, a new stem rust resistance gene Sr59 from Secale cereale was introgressed into wheat, which provides an additional asset for wheat improvement to mitigate yield losses caused by stem rust. Singh et al. (2011) provide a list of known Sr genes and their effectiveness against Ug99.

There has been significant uptake of resistant wheat varieties among Ethiopian farmers since 2014 – a great deal of which is thanks to CGIAR and CIMMYT (the International Maize and Wheat Improvement Center).

Although Sr5, Sr21, Sr9e, Sr7b, Sr11, Sr6, Sr8a, Sr9g, Sr9b, Sr30, Sr17, Sr9a, Sr9d, Sr10, SrTmp, Sr38, and SrMcN are no longer effective in Lebanon, Sr11, Sr24, and Sr31 still are which is diagnostic for the presence of various races of stem rust – but the complete absence of Ug99 specifically – from Lebanon.

=== Sr9h ===
Discovered and found to provide Ug99 resistance by Rouse et al., 2014. However Ug99 isolates from South Africa and Zimbabwe, both in 2010, already had virulence when retested against this new gene. Both Rouse and Wessels et al., 2019 find the Ug99 resistance of cv. 'Matlabas' is probably due to this gene. Wessels finds it is present in less than 5% of breeding lines.

=== Sr14 ===
Sr14 does not protect seedlings against TTKSK but does provide moderate resistance at later stages. It is effective against TTKST.

=== Sr22 ===
There is considerable variation among Sr22 alleles, with some conferring resistance and some susceptibility.

=== Sr27 ===
Sr27 is originally from rye (Imperial Rye), now (as of 2021) widely found in triticale and rarely in hexaploid wheat. Located on the 3A chromosome arm, originally from 3R. Virulence has been observed in field Pgs and in an artificial Pgt × Pgs. When successful, Sr27 is among the few Srs that does not allow the underdeveloped uredinia and slight degree of sporulation commonly allowed by most Srs. Instead there are necrotic or chlorotic flecks. Pgt virulent on wheat with this gene was found in Kenya in 1972. Deployment in triticale in New South Wales and Queensland, Australia, rapidly produced virulence between 1982 and 1984 – the first virulence on this gene in the world. (This was especially associated with the cultivar Coorong.) Therefore, CIMMYT's triticale offerings were tested and many were found to depend solely on Sr27. Four years later, in 1988, virulence was found in South Africa. Sr27 has become less common in CIMMYT triticales since the mid-'80s.

=== Sr31 ===
Ug99 is virulent against Sr31, which was effective against all previous stem rust races.

=== Sr33 ===
An introgression from a wild wheat Aegilops tauschii orthologous to Mla in barley. Confers broad resistance to multiple races including Ug99.

=== Sr35 ===
Sr35 is an introgression from Triticum monococcum conferring some resistance. AvrSr35 – a Pgt gene so named because it was discovered causing avirulence on Sr35 – is the ancestral allele to all Pgt alleles that are virulent on Sr35. AvrSr35 came first, followed by the selective pressure of widespread adoption of Sr35 wheat races, followed by the evolution of virulence on Sr35 by way of nonfunctionalization mutations of AvrSr35.

=== Sr59 ===
Recently, a new stem rust resistance gene Sr59 from Secale cereale was introgressed into wheat, which provides an additional asset for wheat improvement to mitigate yield losses caused by stem rust.

=== Sr62 ===
An NLR (or NB-LRR, or R gene) from Aegilops sharonensis, one of only three resistance genes from that species. Was discovered by Yu et al., 2017 and then introgressed into hexaploid by Millet et al., 2017. Sr62 encodes for a unique tandem protein kinase which is composed of domains which are common among plants. Yu et al., 2022

=== SrTmp ===
Originally from the widespread Ethiopian 'Digalu'. Resistant to Ug99, susceptible to § TKTTF.

== Weaponization ==
In the 1950s, the United States Air Force developed Operation Steelyard, a plan to drop wheat stem rust mixed with feathers over wheat farms in the Soviet Union. If the plan were enacted, Boeing B-29 Superfortress bombers would drop 500-pound M115 bombs over Soviet farms, with the intention of destroying up to 50% of the Soviet winter wheat harvest.

== Future ==
Alone amongst cereals, rice is naturally immune to rusts. If a genetic source of this resistance could be identified, transgenic wheats with rice as the gene donor could be the future.

== See also ==
- Chilean wheat cycle
- List of Puccinia species
