= M115 bomb =

The M115 anti-crop bomb, also known as the feather bomb or the E73 bomb, was a U.S. biological cluster bomb designed to deliver wheat stem rust.

== History ==
Mass production of the M115 bomb began in 1953. The weapon was a modified M16A1 cluster bomb, which was normally used to distribute airborne leaflet propaganda or fragmentation weapons. The U.S. Air Force first pointed out the need for an anti-crop weapon in September 1947. In October 1950 the Air Force began procuring 4,800 M115 bombs. By 1954, with the biological agents causing wheat and rye rust standardized in laboratory culture, the U.S. Air Force prepared to transfer the agent to some 4,800 of the M115s. The deployment of the M115 represented the United States' first, though limited, anti-crop biological warfare (BW) capability. Though the weapon was tested at Fort Detrick, in Frederick, Maryland, it was never used in combat.

== Specifications ==
The M115 was a 500-pound (227 kg) bomb that was converted from a leaflet bomb and to be used to deliver wheat stem rust. Wheat stem rust culture consisted of a dry particulate matter which was adhered to a light-weight vector, usually feathers. Because of its method of dissemination, the bomb was commonly referred to as the "feather bomb". The feathers would fall over a wide area when released. The M115 was shown to establish 100,000 foci of infection over a 50-square-mile (130 km^{2}) area.

== Tests involving the M115 ==
According to a 1950 military report the M115 was tested in an area 11 miles (18 km) long and 1.5 miles (2.4 km) wide. The area consisted of 7.5 acres (30,000 m^{2}) plots sown with the Overland variety of oats, susceptible to the test agent, Puccinia graminis avenae, but not to other strains of cereal rust. The test drops of the M115 showed that, from an altitude of 4,000 feet (1,200 m), feathers could be spread over an area of 12 square miles (31 km^{2}). Three M115 feather bombs were dropped 1 mile (1.6 km) upwind from the target area, which was then monitored for any changes. Estimates showed about a 30% reduction in yield from the infected area.

== See also ==
- E77 balloon bomb
- M33 cluster bomb
