= Peter J. Davies =

American plant physiologist

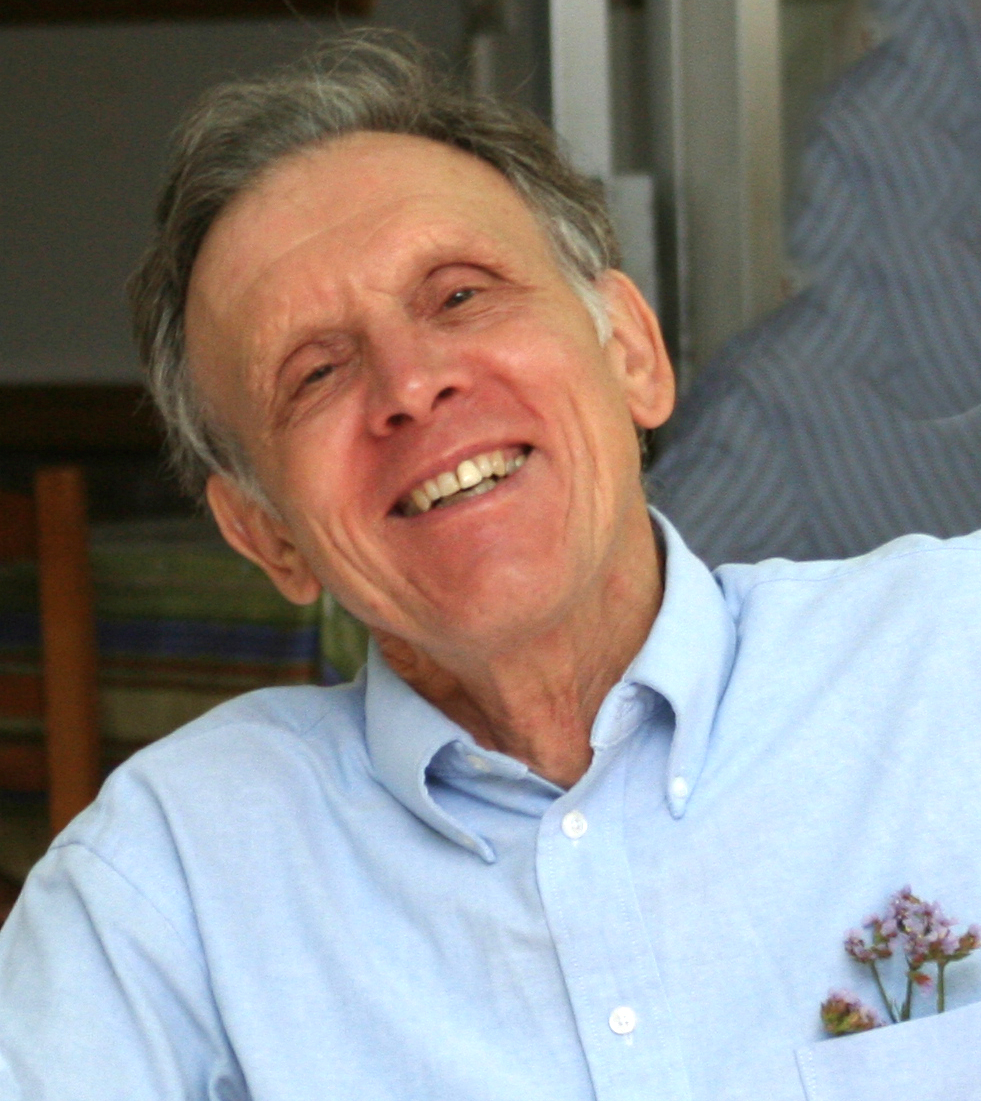
- Citizenship: United States
- Education: University of Reading, B. Sc., PhD; University of California, Davis M.S.
- Known for: Plant Physiology, Plant Hormones
- Awards: Jefferson Science Fellow at the United States Department of State
- Scientific career
- Fields: Plant Physiology, Plant Biotechnology
- Workplaces: Yale University; Cornell University

Peter John Davies is a professor emeritus of Plant Physiology in the Departments of Plant Biology and Horticulture at Cornell University who is notable for his work on plant development, plant hormones, and in educating the public on agricultural technology and genetically modified organisms (GMOs) as a Jefferson Science Fellow from 2011 to 2014. As a Jefferson Science Fellow Davies monitored developments in agriculture and food security, monitored the status of biotech crops in Europe, and provided input to promote the acceptance of these crops on a scientific basis.

== Personal life ==
Peter J. Davies was born in Harrow in London U.K. in 1940, the son of William B. Davies, an Anglican vicar in Edmonton and Enfield U.K., and Ivy D Davies. Peter Davies married Linda DeNoyer. They have two children: Kenneth Davies and Caryn Davies.

== University life ==
Davies earned a B.Sc. in Agricultural Botany (1962) and a Ph.D. in Agricultural Botany with an emphasis on herbicide physiology in 1966 from the University of Reading in England, and an M.S. in Plant Physiology from the University of California, Davis in 1964. He did a postdoc with Arthur Galston and an instructor in the Biology Department at Yale University. At Cornell University, Davies became an assistant professor in 1969, an associate professor in 1975, a Full Professor in 1983 and retired in 2016. A Mini-Symposium Celebrated Davies' 46 years in Plant Sciences at Cornell.

== Research ==
Davies research has been on the role of plant hormones in whole plant physiology, including stem growth, whole-plant senescence, tomato ripening and potato tuberization.

In 1866, Gregor Mendel, the father of genetics, demonstrated that height in peas was controlled by a single factor. More than a century later, Davies discovered that Mendel's stem length gene (Le) in peas encoded a gibberellin 3β-hydroxylase. This enzyme converts GA_{20}, an inactive form of gibberellin to GA_{1}, the form of gibberellin that stimulates stem growth in peas. The conversion of gibberellins results in the tall phenotype that Mendel observed. The mutant (le) that was observed by Mendel is shorter because it is unable to convert sufficient GA_{20} to GA_{1}.

== Awards and honors ==
Davies was the Potato Grower Researcher of the Year for 2008. He was a Senior Fellow at the Institute of Advanced Studies, Università di Bologna, Italy in 2010, an OECD (Trade Agriculture) Research Fellow at the Università di Bologna, Italy in 2010, a Jefferson Science Fellow in the United States Department of State from 2011 to 2014 and was made an International Professor of Plant Biology at Cornell University in 2013.

== Video lectures on Genetically-Modified Organisms (GMOs) ==
- How to Evaluate Evidence For and Against GMOs (Cornell University, December 8, 2015)
- Jefferson Lecture at the Department of State on Crop Biotechnology: Science and Sustainability (Department of State, March 27, 2012)
- Are GMO foods safe? We asked an expert.

== Books ==
- Galston, A. W. and P. J. Davies (1970) Control Mechanisms in Plant Development, Prentice-Hall, Englewood Cliffs, NJ
- Davies, P. J. ed. (1975) Historical and Current Aspects of Plant Physiology: A Symposium Honoring F.C. Steward, New York State College of Agriculture and Life Sciences, Cornell University, Ithaca, NY
- Galston, A. W., P. J. Davies and R. L. Satter (1980) The Life of the Green Plant, Third edition, Prentice-Hall, Englewood Cliffs, NJ
- Davies, P. J. ed. (1987) Plant Hormones and their Role in Plant Growth and Development, M. Nijhoff, Dordrecht
- Davies, P. J. ed. (1995) Plant Hormones: Physiology, Biochemistry and Molecular Biology, Kluwer Academic, Dordrecht
- Davies, P. J. ed. (2004, revised edition 2010) Plant Hormones: Biosynthesis, Signal Transduction, Action!, Kluwer Academic, Dordrecht
