= Shine Muscat =

Variety of table grape

- Grape (Vitis)
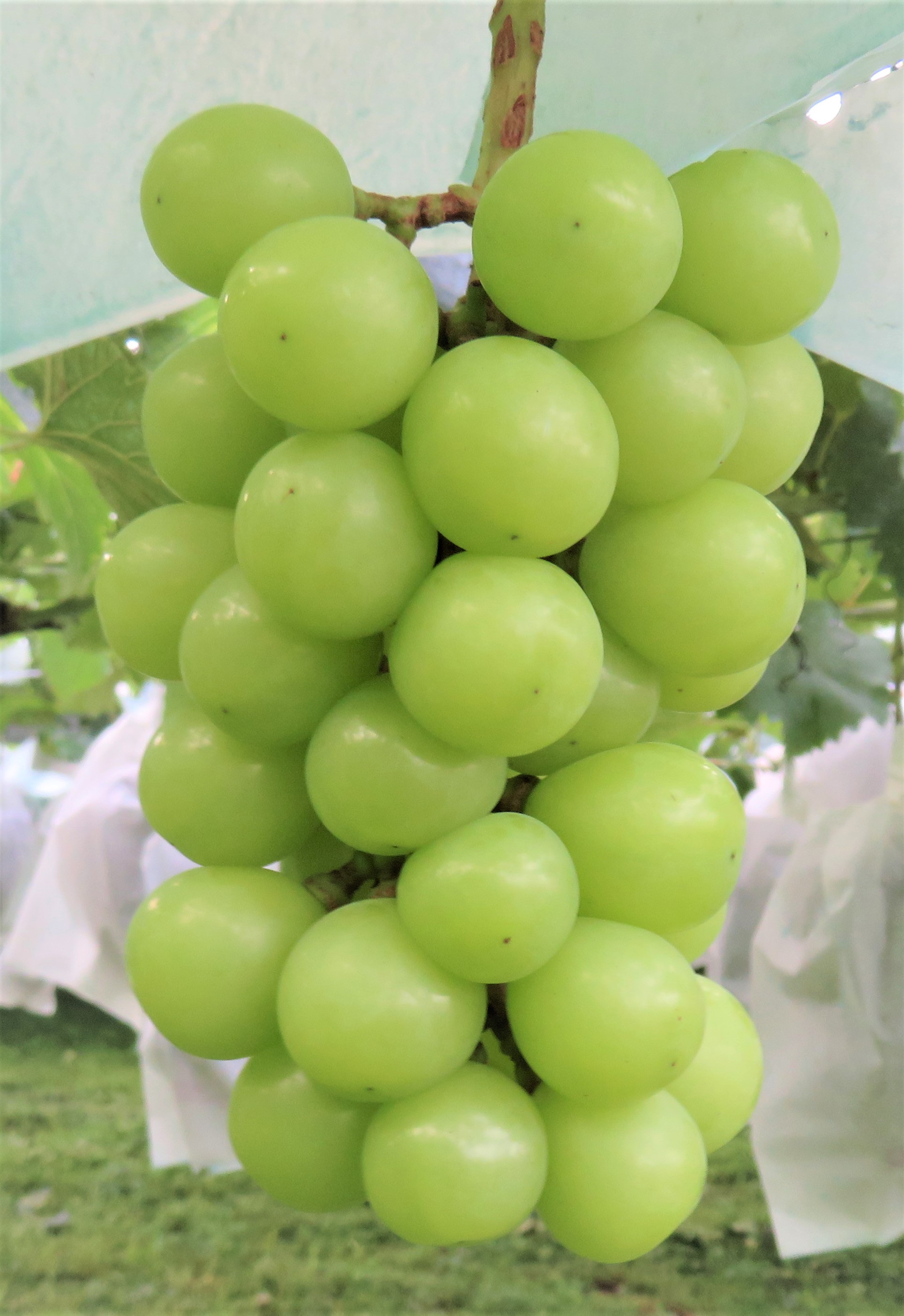
- Shine Muscat
- Color of berry skin: Blanc
- Species: interspecific Vitis hybrid
- Origin: Japan
- Original pedigree: Akitsu-21 × Hakunan
- Pedigree parent 1: Akitsu-21 = Steuben × Muscat of Alexandria
- Pedigree parent 2: Hakunan = Katta Kurgan × Kaiji
- VIVC number: 22688

Shine Muscat is a grape cultivar. Its Nomenclature registration number is "Grape Agriculture and Forestry No. 21" (ぶどう農林21号). Japan's Institute of Fruit Tree and Tea Science (NIFTS) registered Shine Muscat as a plant variety domestically in 2006, but its international protection lapsed because the variety was not registered for global protection within the six-year UPOV deadline.

By 2012, the variety was effectively treated as unprotected outside Japan, allowing growers in countries such as China and South Korea to propagate it legally without paying royalties. In response, Japan passed legislation in 2021 restricting the overseas sale of seeds and seedlings, enabling developers to designate export destinations to protect their intellectual property. In Japan, Shine Muscat is considered a high-end grape, reportedly selling for up to US$100 per bunch, while production in China and South Korea, with larger cultivation areas, has allowed for more affordable prices and a substantial increase in global market share.

== Overview and history ==
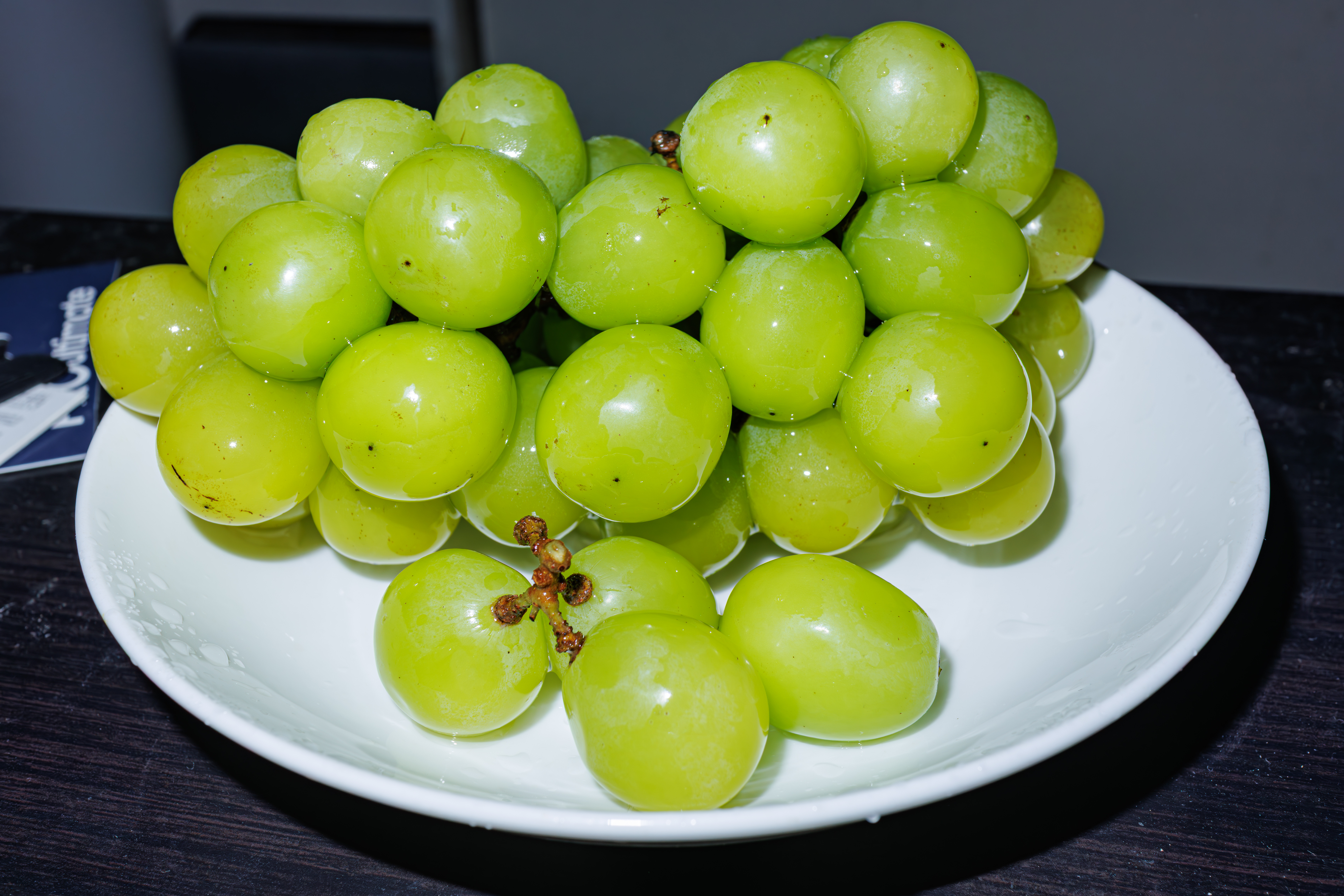

It is a cultivar that was bred at the National Institute of Agrobiological Sciences' grape research center (formerly the Akitsu Branch of the Fruit Tree Experiment Station of the Ministry of Agriculture, Forestry and Fisheries (旧農林水産省果樹試験場安芸津支場) in Akitsu-cho, Higashihiroshima City, Hiroshima Prefecture and is an early maturing variety that ripens in mid-August in Hiroshima, where it was bred.

The Muscat of Alexandria, commonly known as Muscat in Japan, is a grape with good taste and texture, but European grapes, including this species, are prone to cracking and disease in areas with heavy rainfall and are not suited to the Japanese climate, requiring facilities such as glasshouses for cultivation.

Resistant to disease and tolerant of the Japanese climate, American grapes are difficult to bite through and are generally considered to be less palatable than European grapes. It also has a unique aroma called foxy scent.

To improve on these shortcomings, the cultivar Steuben, which has the highest sugar content of all American grapes, and Muscat of Alexandria were crossed, and Grape Akitsu 21 was born.

This Akitsu 21 had a flesh similar to Muscat of Alexandria and was rather large, but it had a not-so-good aroma, a mixture of Muscat and Foxy scents.

Therefore, a large-grained European grape cultivar called "Hakunan" (a cross between Cattacurgan and Kaiji), which was created at the Uehara Grape Research Institute in Yamanashi Prefecture, was crossed with a variety that had the best quality and taste but gave up badly due to skin contamination, and this variety with only Muscat aroma was born.

The grapes were selected from the seedlings of a cross between Akitsu No. 21 and Hakunan in 1988, and from 1999 to 2002, the grapes were named "Grape Akitsu No. 23" and submitted to a strain adaptability test to examine their characteristics nationwide.

Named "Shine-Muscat" and registered on September 5, 2003, as Grape No. 21 of Agriculture and Forestry, and registered on March 9, 2006, as Grape No. 13,891 (valid for 30 years).

== Pedigree of Shine Muscat ==
The "Grape Akitsu 21" was created by crossing Muscat of Alexandria with Steuben, a cultivar with a sweet, high sugar content among American grapes.

                           ┌─ Steuben
              ┌─ Akitsu-21─┤
              │            └─ Muscat of Alexandria
Shine Muscat ─┤
              │            ┌─ Katta Kurgan
              └─ Hakunan ──┤
                           │          ┌─ Flame Tokay
                           └─ Kaiji ──┤
                                      └─ Neomuscat

== Plant morphology ==
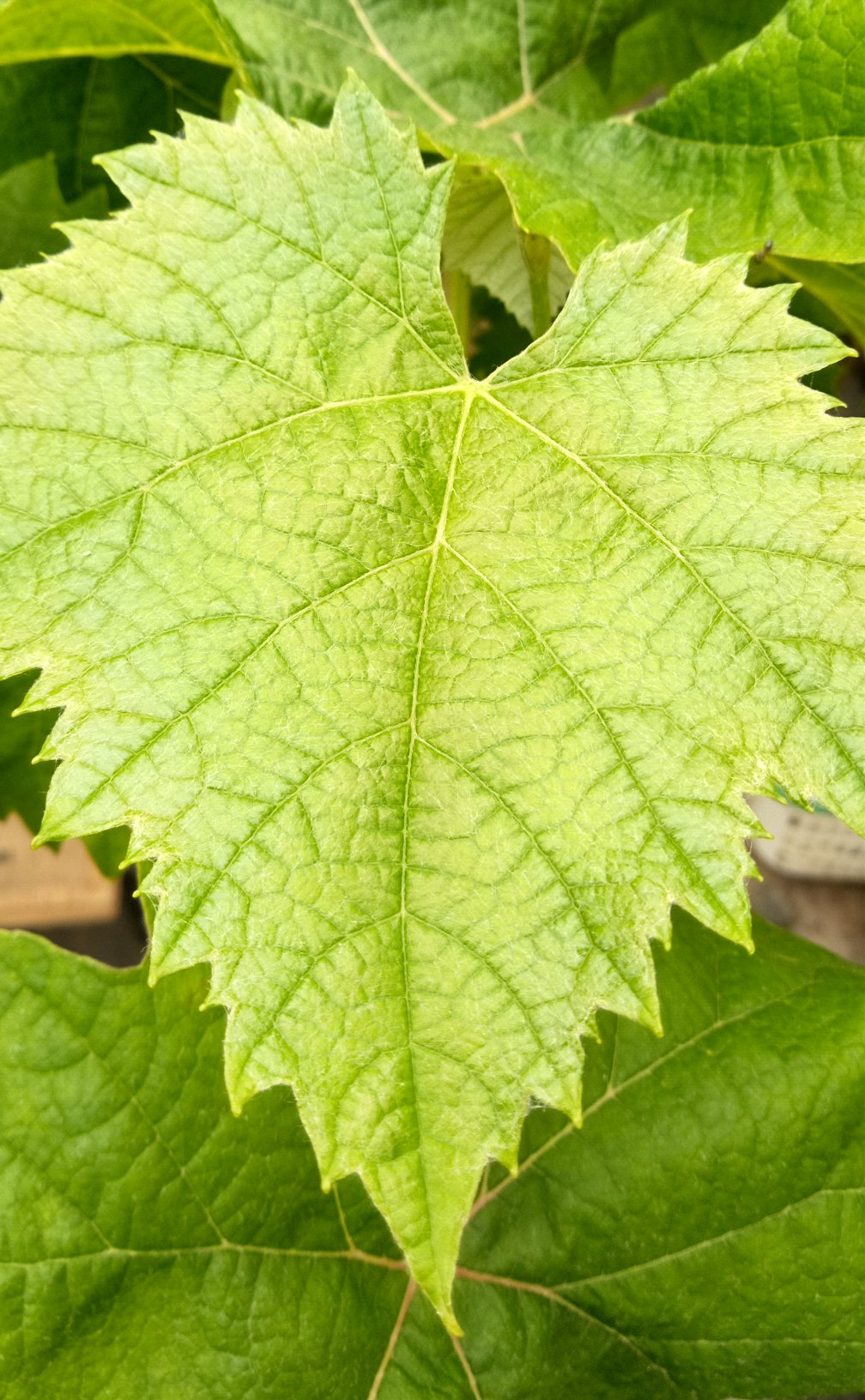
Leaf 1

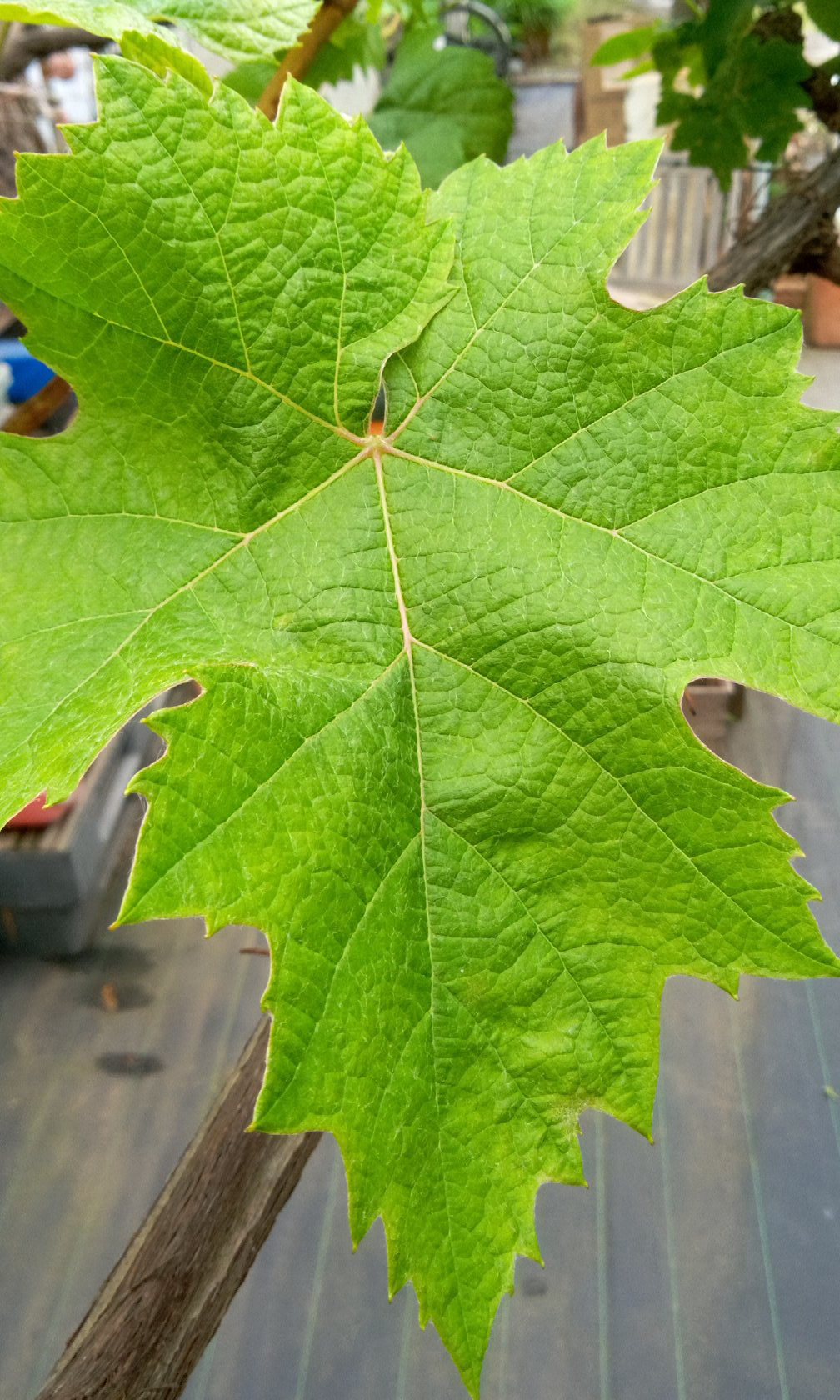
Leaf 2

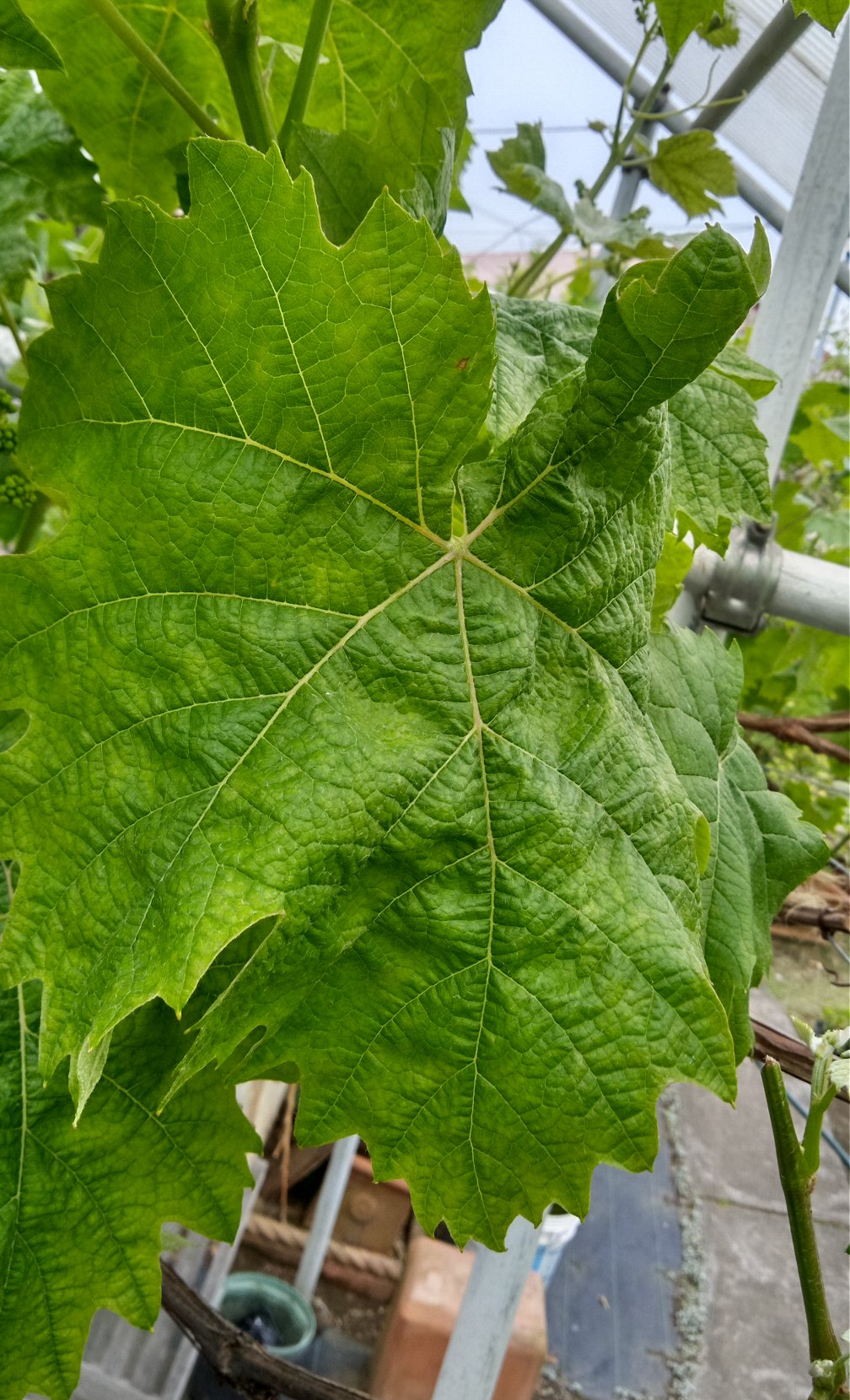
Leaf 3

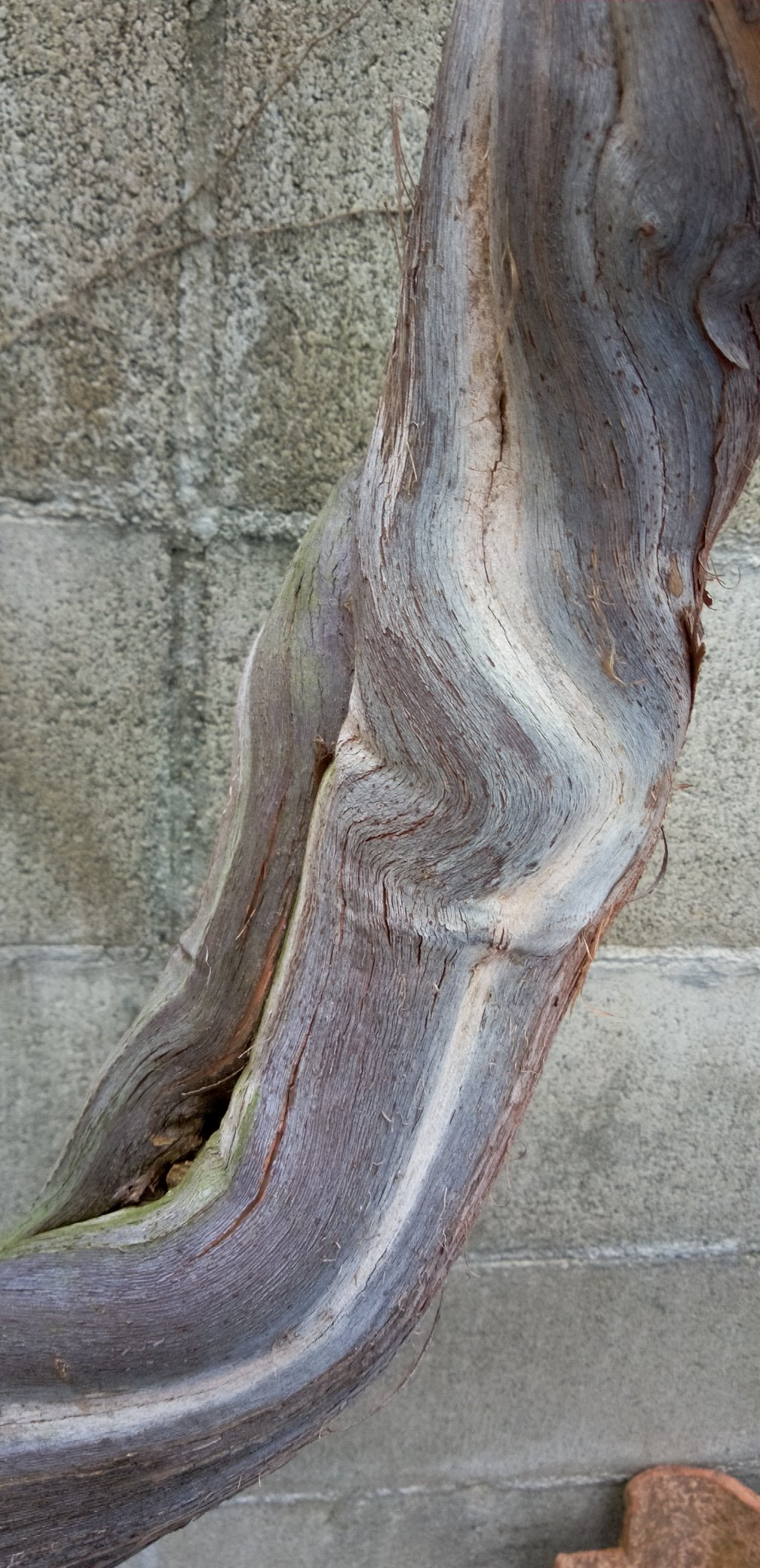
Stem of Shine Muscat

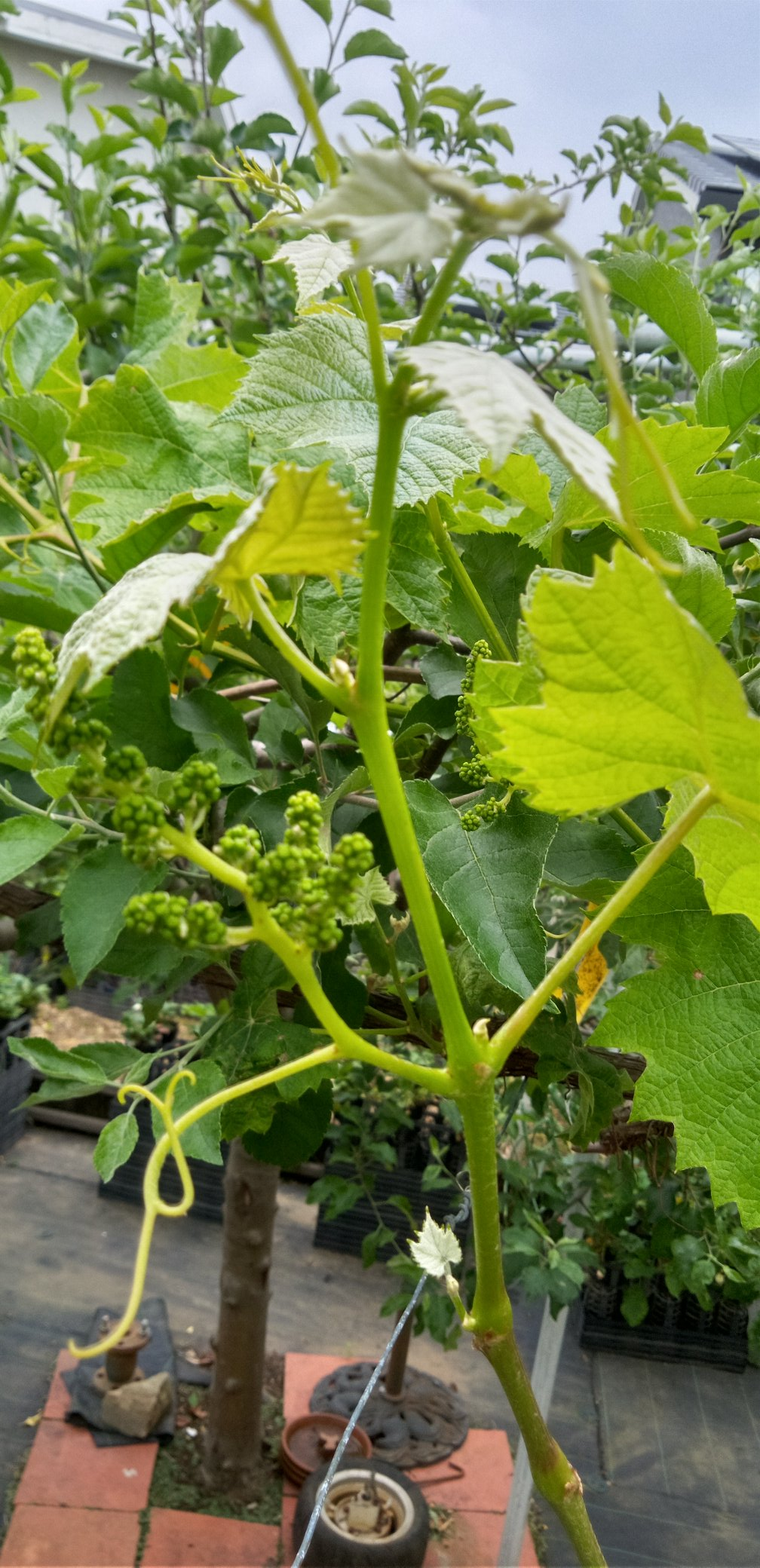
New tip of Shine Muscat

The clusters are cylindrical and weigh 400–500 grams (14–18 oz). The color at maturity is yellowish green, and the grains are short and oval. The size is 11 to 12 grams, about the same as Kyoho. It has a high sugar content of about 20 degrees and a low acid content of 0.3 to 0.4 g/100 mL. With gibberellin treatment, the whole skin can be eaten without seeds.

The leaves are green in color and wavy at maturity. The underside of the leaf is densely covered with flat-lying hairs.

In terms of climate, the grapes are relatively resistant to cold and the color does not deteriorate even when the summer is extremely hot. In terms of taste, texture, and aroma, it is comparable to European grapes in quality. It also has excellent storability.

It is a vigorous tree that can produce its first harvest three years after planting.

== Cultivation ==
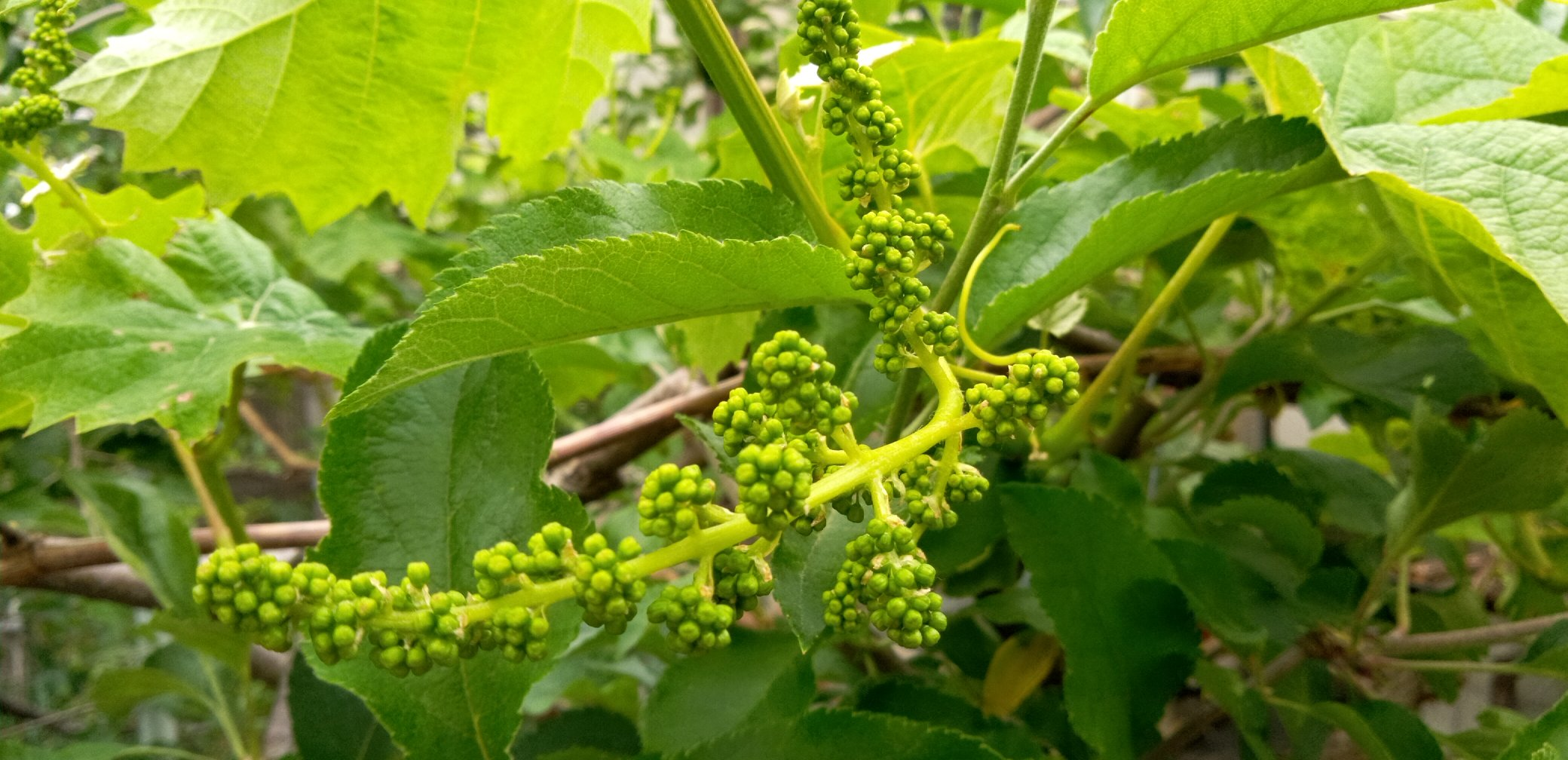
New cluster bud of Shine Muscat

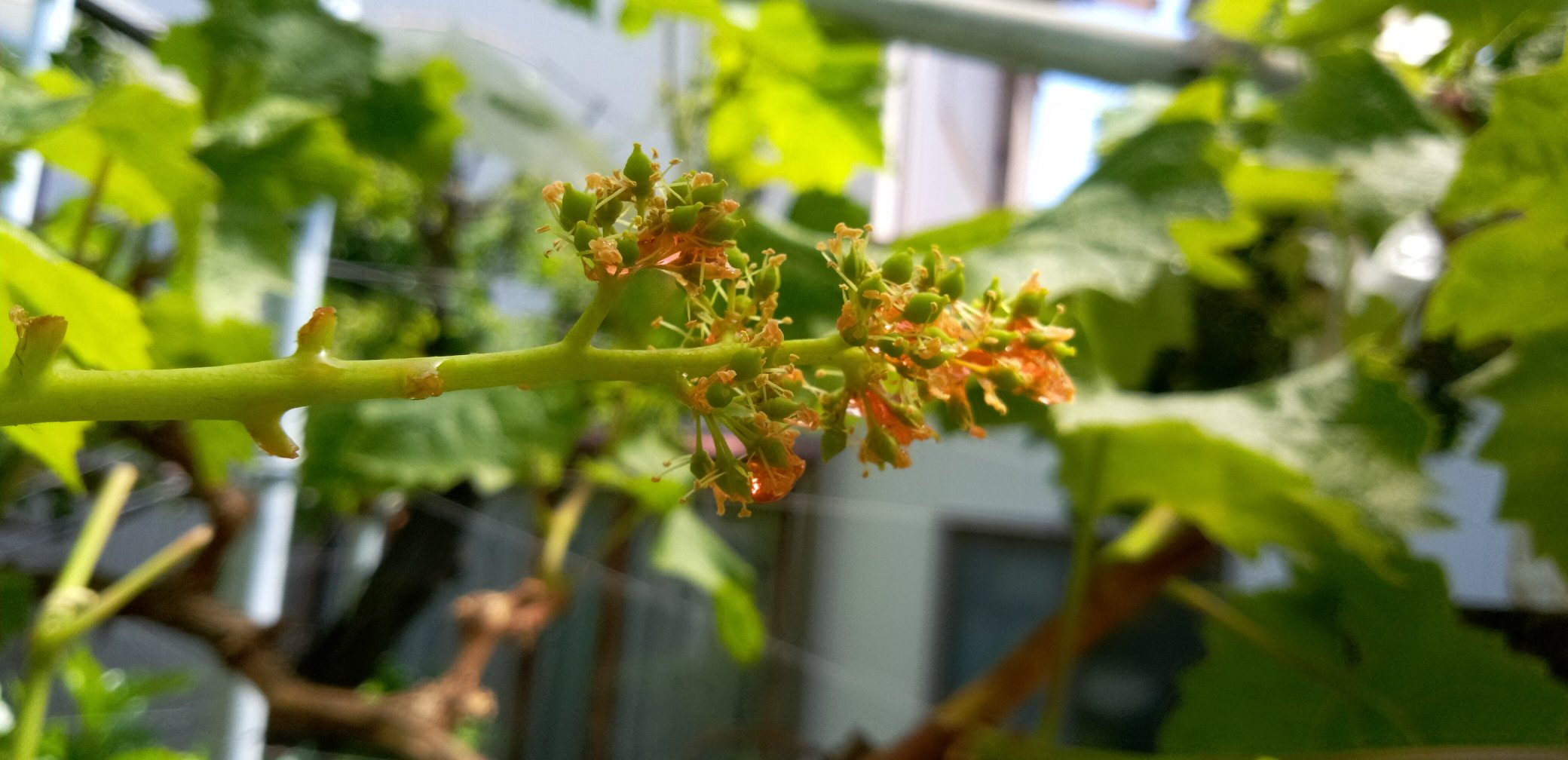
Shaped bunches after gibberellin treatment

The following descriptions are mainly of cultivation methods used in Japan.

=== Shape of an ear (e.g. sprout) ===
For the production of relatively large grains and bunches, shape the flower ear to 3.5 to 4 cm, adjust the axis to 9.5 to 10 cm at about 15 days after full bloom, and place 4 to 5 seeds on the upper stalk and 2 to 3 seeds on the middle to lower stalk to make a cluster of 45 to 50 seeds.

=== Treatment with plant hormone ===
The method of producing seedless or large fruits using gibberellin, a type of plant growth hormone, was developed in Japan. This method has been adapted to Shine Muscat as well as many other grapes for table grapes. The timing and concentration of the treatment is strictly regulated by the type of grape. Many of these methods have been patented.

This process makes the skin thin and the fruit edible as is.

This grape belongs to a diploid European variety. The following treatments are specific to this variety. The objective is to achieve seedlessness and granule enlargement, and the number of treatments can be either one or two, depending on the purpose.

In addition to gibberellin, there is a way to use a combination of forchlorfenuron; see the instructions for the commercial chemical for details.

Processing method
Objective	Gibberellin ppm	Timing	Remarks
seedlessness	12.5～25	From full bloom to 3 days after full bloom	due to rainfall, no more than two times in total
seedlessness and enlargement	25 at first time	From full bloom to 3 days after full bloom	due to rainfall, no more than 4 times in total
	25 at second time	From 10 days after full bloom to 15 days	

If you use the tablet in the picture on the right, the concentration is 25 ppm for one tablet and 200 cc of water.

In the photo on the right, the stamens are dyed with food coloring in a solution of gibberellin to mark the stamens as having been treated. It does not have to be red.

== Production outside Japan ==
Japan's National Institute of Agrobiological Sciences, the developer of Shine Muscat, registered the variety domestically in 2006 but did not seek protection overseas, as it was not initially intended for export. Seedlings were later introduced to South Korea and China, where they were cultivated and sold at lower prices than in Japan.

Legally propagating a plant variety abroad depends on whether international plant variety rights are in force. Under the 1991 Act of the International Convention for the Protection of New Varieties of Plants (UPOV), a new grape variety must be registered internationally within six years of its registration in the country of origin to preserve exclusive rights abroad.

For Shine Muscat, this deadline was 2012. Japan did not file for international registration within this period, and its intellectual property protection outside Japan expired, leaving it unable to collect overseas royalties. As a result, growers in other countries were legally entitled to propagate and market Shine Muscat without compensating Japan. The Ministry of Agriculture, Forestry and Fisheries estimates an annual economic loss of 10 billion yen a year for Japan in this case.

In South Korea, Yeongcheon, Gimcheon, Sangju, Gyeongsan, and Gyeongju in Gyeongbuk are the regions which produce Shine Muscats and export their products about one-third the price in Japan. Korean varieties of Shine Muscat are sold in markets such as Hong Kong, Thailand, Malaysia, and Vietnam.

Chinese products are exported overseas at even lower prices. In 2022, the South China Morning Post reported that in Hong Kong, Shine Muscat grapes from Japan sold for HK$100–500 per bunch and Korean varieties up to HK$300, limiting their appeal among price-sensitive consumers. By comparison, Chinese Shine Muscat, priced at HK$50–100 per bunch, has been more affordable and has gained market share in recent years.
