= CPPU =

CPPU may refer to:

- China People's Police University, a public university in Langfang, Hebei, China
- Forchlorfenuron (with CPPU being its alternative name in chemistry), a chemical compound and plant growth regulator
