= Ruth Lyttle Satter =

American botanist

- Born: March 8, 1923
- Died: August 3, 1989 (aged 66)
- Education: Barnard College; University of Connecticut
- Spouse: Robert Satter
- Children: Four
- Scientific career
- Fields: Botany, plant physiology, chronobiology
- Workplaces: Bell Laboratories; Maxson Company; University of Connecticut; Yale University

Ruth Lyttle Satter (March 8, 1923 – August 3, 1989) was an American botanist best known for her work on circadian leaf movement.

== Biography ==
Ruth Lyttle Satter was born March 8, 1923, in New York City as Ruth Lyttle.

Satter received a B.A. in mathematics and physics from Barnard College in 1944. After graduating, she worked at Bell Laboratories and Maxson Company. In 1946 she married Robert Satter and in 1947 she became a homemaker, devoting herself to raising her and Robert's four children, Mimi, Shoshana, Jane and Dick. While raising her children, her love of plants led her to complete the New York Botanical Garden's horticulturist training in 1951 and to serve as a horticulture instructor for the YMCA Hobby School from 1953 to 1963.

In 1964, she began her graduate studies in plant physiology at the University of Connecticut, where she earned her PhD in botany in 1968. During her doctoral work, Satter began unraveling the molecular underpinnings of the plant circadian clock. She determined the impact of red/far red light and the associated photopigment, phytochrome, on plant morphogenesis. Her work on circadian rhythms would define her career and markedly impact the field of chronobiology.

In 1968, after completion of her PhD, Satter joined the lab of Arthur W. Galston at Yale University to work first as a staff biologist and then as a research associate. At Yale, Satter continued her research on plant chronobiology by studying control of leaf movements. Her work demonstrated that ion flux in leaf motor cells drives this movement, and that the same mechanisms control the movement if the plant is in an environment with a light-dark cycle or an environment with constant light or constant darkness. Additionally, in 1980, she co-authored the third edition of The Life of the Green Plant, a textbook on plant physiology and botany, with Galston and another colleague, Peter J. Davies.

In 1980, Satter also became a professor-in-residence at the University of Connecticut, where she discovered that the phosphatidylinositol cycle is the basic light transduction mechanism in the leaf motor cells. The same year Ruth was diagnosed with chronic lymphocytic leukemia but this diagnosis only heightened her scientific focus. During this time she published multiple papers, worked on a book, and gained international acclaim for her work on chronobiology. She also stayed active with her husband as they traveled the world to bike, swim, and experience different cultures.

== Death and legacy ==
While Satter had remained active throughout most of her illness, her health began to deteriorate in the late 1980s. As her quality of life plummeted, she chose to end treatment and take control of her remaining time. Her peace with this decision and her final days were immortalized by her husband in a New York Times article.

Satter finally lost her protracted battle with leukemia at the age of 66 on August 3, 1989. Satter's will established the Ruth Satter Memorial Award which gives $1000 to women who interrupted their education for at least three years to raise a family. In 1990, the Ruth Lyttle Satter Prize in Mathematics was also established in her memory, with funds donated by her sister, Joan S. Birman. The prize is given every two years and honors Satter's commitment to research and encourages women in science by awarding $5000 to a woman who has made a significant contribution to mathematics research.

== Contributions to chronobiology ==
=== Mechanisms of circadian leaf movement ===
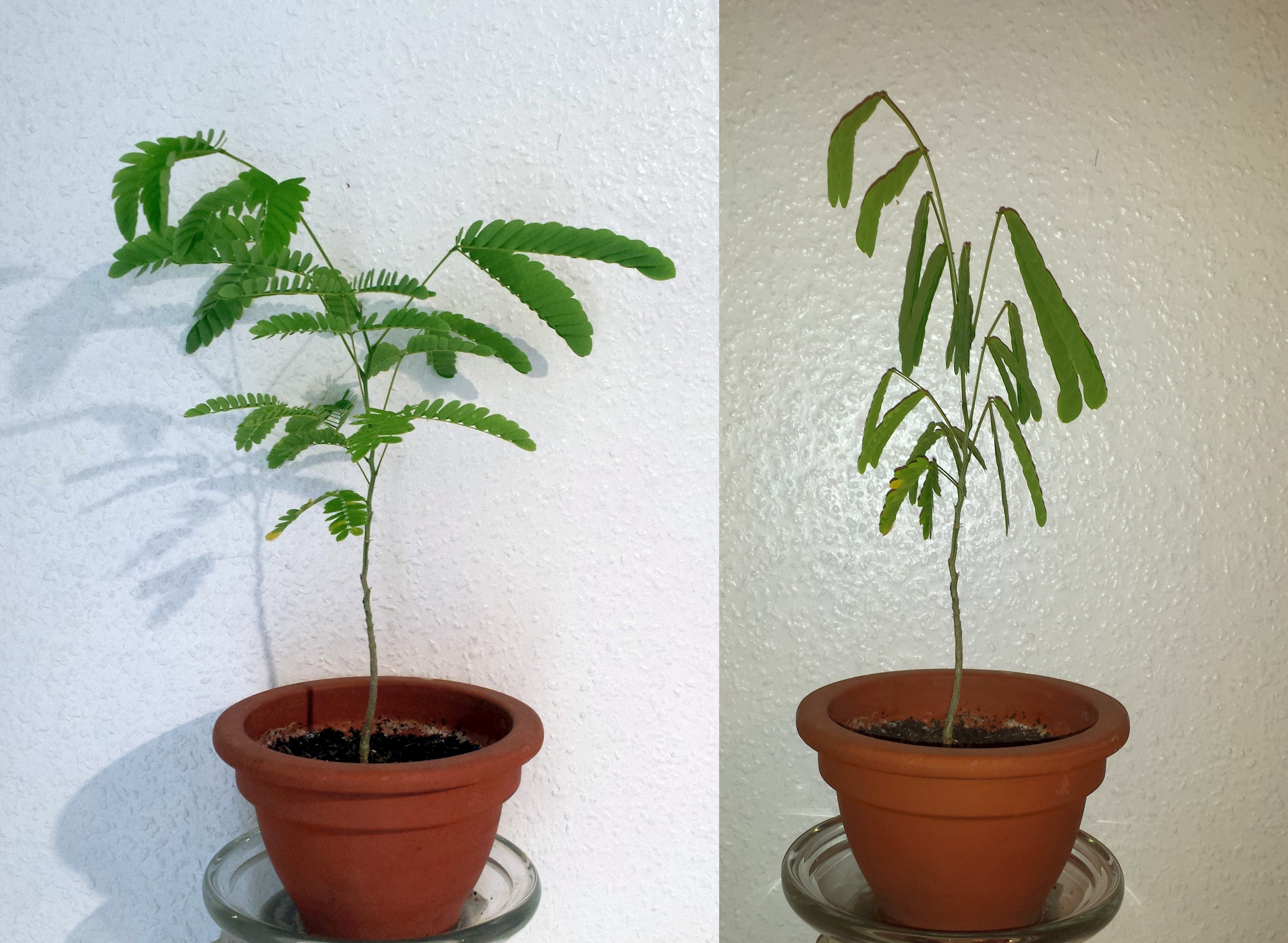
Motor leaf movement in Albizia julibrissin, a model plant used in Satter's research

Circadian leaf movement was first observed by the French monk Jean-Jacques d'Ortous de Mairan in the 18th century. It was such a critical method for observing circadian rhythms in plants that the phenomena was dubbed the "hands of the circadian clock". However, it was not until Satter's groundbreaking work that the molecular mechanisms of this phenomenon were understood.

Satter worked to decipher the structure and function of pulvini, specialized plant motor organs found at the base of leaves and leaflets which allow leaves to extend and fold down. She identified that changes in potassium and chloride ion concentrations in pulvini drive osmotic water flux, or changes in the amount of water in the cell. The pulvini contain two cell types, flexor and extensor cells. Satter's work demonstrated that as the flexor gains solutes and thus water to increase their rigidity, the extensor loses ions and water to decrease their rigidity. The coordinated inverse rigidity changes in extensor and flexor induce extension or collapse of the pulvinus to lift and lower leaflets.

Satter also collaborated with Richard Racusen of the University of Vermont to study circadian changes in pulvini membrane potential. Satter determined that the changes in membrane potential were too quick to be explained by the passive movement of potassium ions reported in her earlier papers. She discovered an energy-consuming proton pump that removes protons (H^{+}) from the cell, facilitating the observed rapid electrical changes as well as potassium ion flux. Thus, Satter and Racusen determined that changes in membrane potential drives the ion flux necessary for circadian leaf movement. Additional experiments observing the pH in both flexor and extensor pulvini cells in different experimental conditions (darkness, white light, red light, and far red light) demonstrated that pH levels in flexor and extensor cells were inversely correlated. From these studies, Satter demonstrated that proton pumps were active in flexor cells in darkness and in extensor cells in light.

=== Entrainment of motor cells ===
Satter additionally unveiled the mechanisms that allow circadian leaf movements to synchronize with (entrain to) light-dark cycles. She showed that phytochromes, a type of plant photopigment, mediate changes in membrane potential of pulvini in response to red and far-red light.

Phytochromes have two interconvertible isomeric forms, P_{fr} and P_{r}. Red light converts the pulvinus phytochrome to the P_{fr} form which promotes leaf closing, while exposure to far-red light converts the photopigment to the P_{r} form and promotes leaf opening. P_{fr} phytochrome depolarizes the cell membrane by opening potassium ion channels and facilitating potassium ion flow while P_{r} hyperpolarizes the cell membrane to close the potassium ion channel and prevent ion flow. Over the course of 24 hours, the amount of red and far-red light in the environment changes, so the form of phytochrome in the pulvinus also changes over time, causing the plant leaves to open or close as a result of the environmental light cycle.

Satter also studied other methods of leaf movement entrainment including the effects of blue light. Satter and her colleagues showed that blue light leads to phase shifts in leaf movement in both Samanea saman and Albizia. Satter found that blue light exposure can affect when plant leaves extend and that the timing of blue light exposure determined whether leaves extended earlier or later than expected. While these studies revealed that blue light could advance or delay circadian leaf movement rhythms, the photoreceptor that mediates this response would not be discovered until later.
