= Chlormequat =

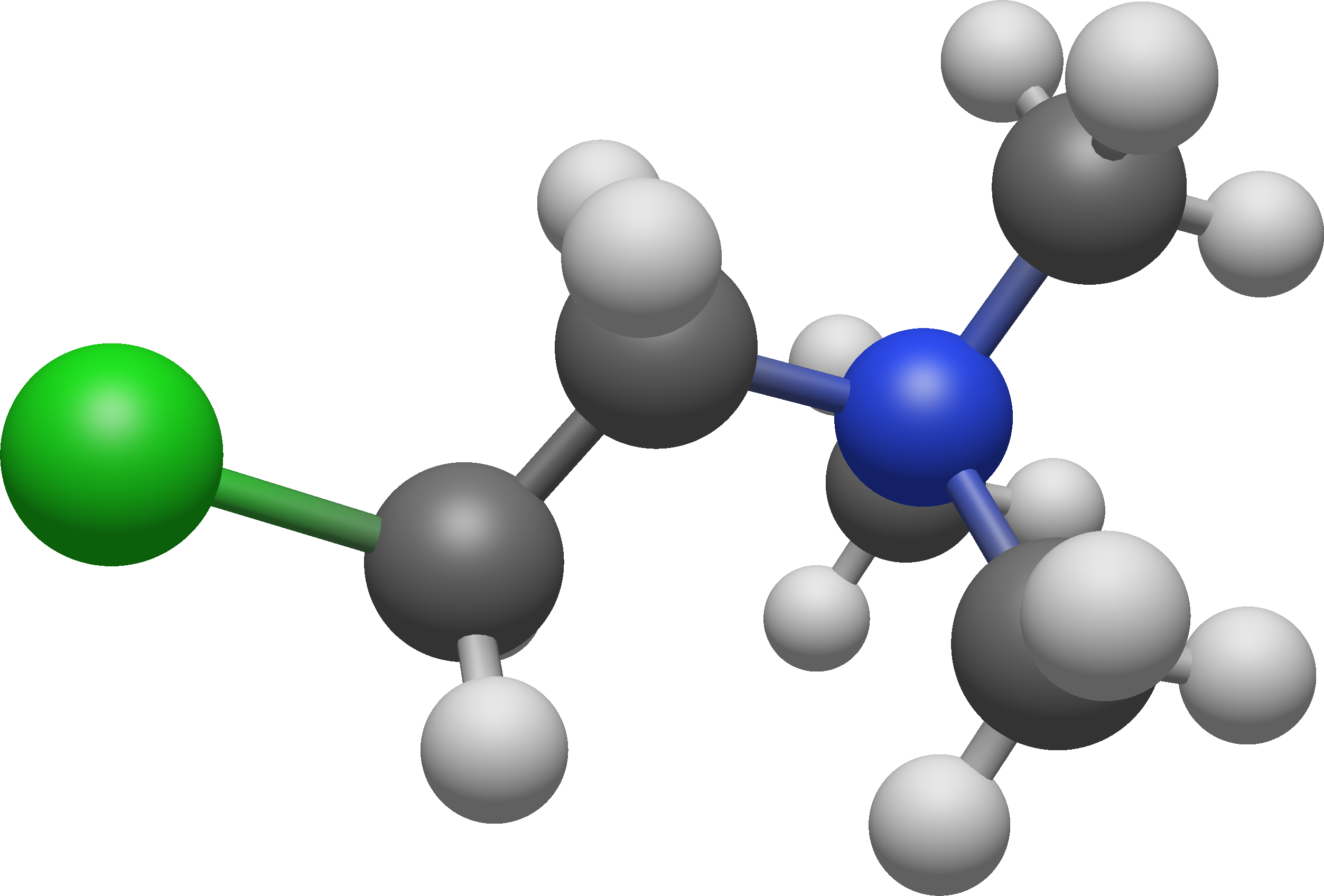

Names
- Preferred IUPAC name 2-Chloro-N,N,N-trimethylethan-1-aminium
- Other names Chlorocholine; Chlorcholine

Identifiers
CAS Number	7003-89-6; 999-81-5 (chloride salt)
3D model (JSmol)	Interactive image
ChemSpider	13237
PubChem CID	13837
UNII	8SUZ1123XX; PPL2215L82 (chloride salt)
CompTox Dashboard (EPA)	DTXSID4048064
- InChI: InChI=1S/C5H13ClN/c1-7(2,3)5-4-6/h4-5H2,1-3H3/q+1 Key: JUZXDNPBRPUIOR-UHFFFAOYSA-N; InChI=1/C5H13ClN/c1-7(2,3)5-4-6/h4-5H2,1-3H3/q+1 Key: JUZXDNPBRPUIOR-UHFFFAOYAN
- SMILES: ClCC[N+](C)(C)C

Properties
Chemical formula	C_{5}H_{13}ClN
Molar mass	122.62 g·mol^{−1}
Melting point	245 °C (decomp.)
- Except where otherwise noted, data are given for materials in their standard state (at 25 °C [77 °F], 100 kPa). Infobox references

Chlormequat is an organic compound with the formula ClCH_{2}CH_{2}N(CH_{3})^{+}_{3} that is used as a plant growth regulator. It is typically sold as the chloride salt, chlormequat chloride (C_{5}H_{13}Cl_{2}N), a colorless hygroscopic crystalline substance that is soluble in water and ethanol. It is an alkylating agent and a quaternary ammonium salt. Chlormequat is one of the onium-type growth regulators.

== Plant interactions ==
Chlormequat was discovered in the 1950s, and was the first known plant growth regulator. It can cause stem thickening, reduced stem height, additional root development, plant dwarfing, and increase chlorophyll concentration.

Chlormequat is an inhibitor of gibberellin biosynthesis, thereby causing reduced cell elongation and thicker sturdier stalks that facilitate harvesting of cereal crops. It can also be used as an adjuvant for herbicides by retarding their oxidative disposal by plants. This is due to cytochrome P450-inhibition.

== Regulation and toxicity ==
In the United States, chlormequat is classified as a low risk plant growth regulator and it is registered for use on ornamental plants grown in greenhouses, nurseries, and shadehouses. The LD_{50} (rat, oral) is approximately 670 mg/kg. Exposure to high levels of chlormequat has been linked to developmental toxicity in animal models.

Chlormequat has not previously been registered for use on food crops in the United States. In April 2023, the U.S. Environmental Protection Agency proposed allowing the use of the chemical on food crops such as barley, oat, triticale, and wheat. The EPA's human health risk assessment indicated "no dietary, residential, or aggregate (i.e., combined dietary and residential exposures) risks of concern." No risks were identified by EPA to aquatic species of invertebrates, vertebrates, and plants in addition to terrestrial plants.

=== EU Regulations ===
In July 2022, the EU published Regulation (EU) 2022/1290, which amended the maximum residue levels (MRLs) for chlormequat in or on certain products, based on the scientific assessment of EFSA and the international standards of the Codex Alimentarius Commission. The regulation lowered the MRL for chlormequat in citrus fruits from 2 mg/kg to 0.5 mg/kg, and also modified the MRLs for other products such as apples, pears, quinces, cherries, plums, apricots, and barley. The regulation also set a specific MRL of 0.01 mg/kg for Spodoptera exigua multicapsid nucleopolyhedrovirus (SeMNPV) isolate BV-0004, a biological plant protection product containing chlormequat as a co-formulant. The regulation entered into force on 14 August 2022.
