= Glyphosine =

Names
- Preferred IUPAC name N,N-bis(phosphonomethyl)glycine

Identifiers
CAS Number	2439-99-8
3D model (JSmol)	Interactive image
ChEBI	CHEBI:63484
ChEMBL	ChEMBL265954
ChemSpider	16196
ECHA InfoCard	100.017.699
EC Number	219-468-4
KEGG	C19132
PubChem CID	17112
UNII	2U96121SKR
CompTox Dashboard (EPA)	DTXSID2044557
- InChI: InChI=1S/C4H11NO8P2/c6-4(7)1-5(2-14(8,9)10)3-15(11,12)13/h1-3H2,(H,6,7)(H2,8,9,10)(H2,11,12,13) Key: OXHDYFKENBXUEM-UHFFFAOYSA-N
- SMILES: C(C(=O)O)N(CP(=O)(O)O)CP(=O)(O)O

Properties
Chemical formula	C_{4}H_{11}NO_{8}P_{2}
Molar mass	263.079 g·mol^{−1}
Appearance	Colourless solid
Solubility in water	350 g/L

Hazards
- Occupational safety and health (OHS/OSH)
Main hazards	danger
- GHS labelling
Pictograms	(GHS05: Corrosive)
Signal word	Warning
Hazard statements	H318
Precautionary statements	P264+P265, P280, P305+P354+P338, P317
- Lethal dose or concentration (LD, LC)
LD_{50} (median dose)	3925 mg/kg (rat, oral)
- Except where otherwise noted, data are given for materials in their standard state (at 25 °C [77 °F], 100 kPa). Infobox references

Glyphosine is a plant growth regulator used on sugar beet and sugarcane. It inhibits fiber production, causing the plant to divert more dry matter to sucrose storage. 76,000 pounds (34,000 kg) of glyphosine were used in the US in 1974. It was first registered in 1972, though now is considered largely obsolete. In other plants, e.g. maize, it causes chlorosis by inhibiting plasmid RNA synthesis. It can be synthesized from chloroacetic acid and N,N-bis(phosphonomethyl)amine. Metals form complexes with glyphosine.

Chemically, glyphosine is a tertiary amine, a glycine derivative and a phosphonic acid.

It has been manufactured by CCA Biochemical and Monsanto, and sold under the "Polaris" trademark.

== Links ==
- Glyphosine in the Pesticide Properties DataBase (PPDB)
