= Leaf expansion =

Leaf expansion is a process by which plants make efficient use of the space around them by causing their leaves to enlarge, or wither. This process enables a plant to maximize its own biomass, whether it be due to increased surface area; which enables more sunlight to be absorbed by chloroplasts, driving the rate of photosynthesis upward, or it enables more stomata to be created on the leaf surface, allowing the plant to increase its carbon dioxide intake.

== Mechanism ==
Initially, sensory organs, such as chloroplasts, the cambium, and roots, detect external stimuli, such as light. The stimulus triggers biochemical events downstream that result in the expansion of tissue in the leaf. There are two processes by which this occurs: osmotic regulation, which has a temporary effect that causes leaves to increase size, or wall extensibility, which gradually changes the leaf over time and permanently enlarges it.

=== Osmotic regulation ===
Red light hits leaves and depolarizes the plasma membrane of plant cells via photosensitive calcium and chloride ion channels. Chloride leaves the cells, while calcium enters. This depolarization causes an osmotic shift in ionic concentrations in the apoplast, which concurrently causes an increase in turgor pressure based on apoplastic solute potentials, forming an electrical gradient across the plasma membrane. The increase in turgor pressure causes the cells to expand, enabling the chloroplasts to shift to a different area, and the collective expansion of all the cells at once causes the leaf itself to become larger and more rigid. The movement of the chloroplasts enables light that was previously unobtainable to be reached and utilized.

=== Wall extensibility ===
Blue light hits a plant's leaves and causes the downstream activation of proton pumps. In turn, this results in a decrease of the cell wall's pH. The decrease, in conjunction with membrane-bound proteins called expansins, increases the plasticity of the apoplastic membrane. This plasticity enables more cell area to be created during cell division, which expands the leaf as more standard-sized cells are added. The increase in overall organelles and cell area causes more stomates to form and more light to be utilized.

== In nature ==
Different types of plants tend to grow at different rates. Those that grow slowly tend to prioritize having much smaller leaf areas in order to conserve energy, and will only expend them when an excess of light is close by. This is due to light being scarce, their slow growth preventing them from reaching the heights that fast-growing plants reach that provides them with plentiful amounts of light. As a contrast, the fast-growing plants have large leaves as a result of constantly being bathed in light. The differing leaf sizes allow both types of plants to coexist in nature while in different ecological niches, and explain why certain canopy layers tend to be highly uneven.

== See also ==
- Hyponastic response
