= Petiole (botany) =

Stalk attaching a leaf to a plant

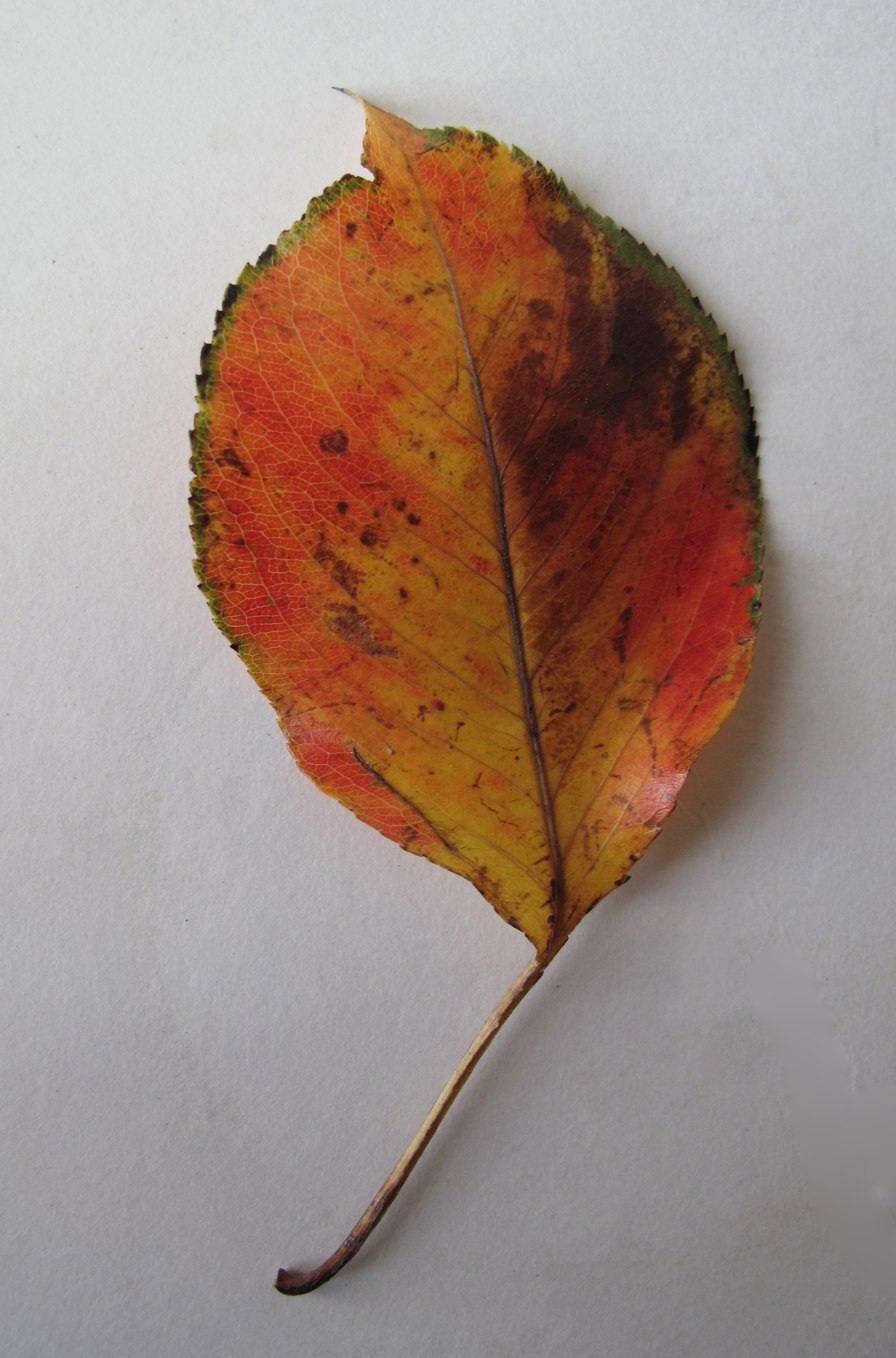
Leaf of Pyrus calleryana with petiole

In botany, the petiole (/ˈpiːti.oʊl, ˈpɛti-/), commonly known as the leaf stem or leaf stalk, is the stalk that attaches the leaf to the twigs, branches or stems of a plant. The terms petiolate and apetiolate are applied, respectively, to leaves with and without petioles.

== Description ==
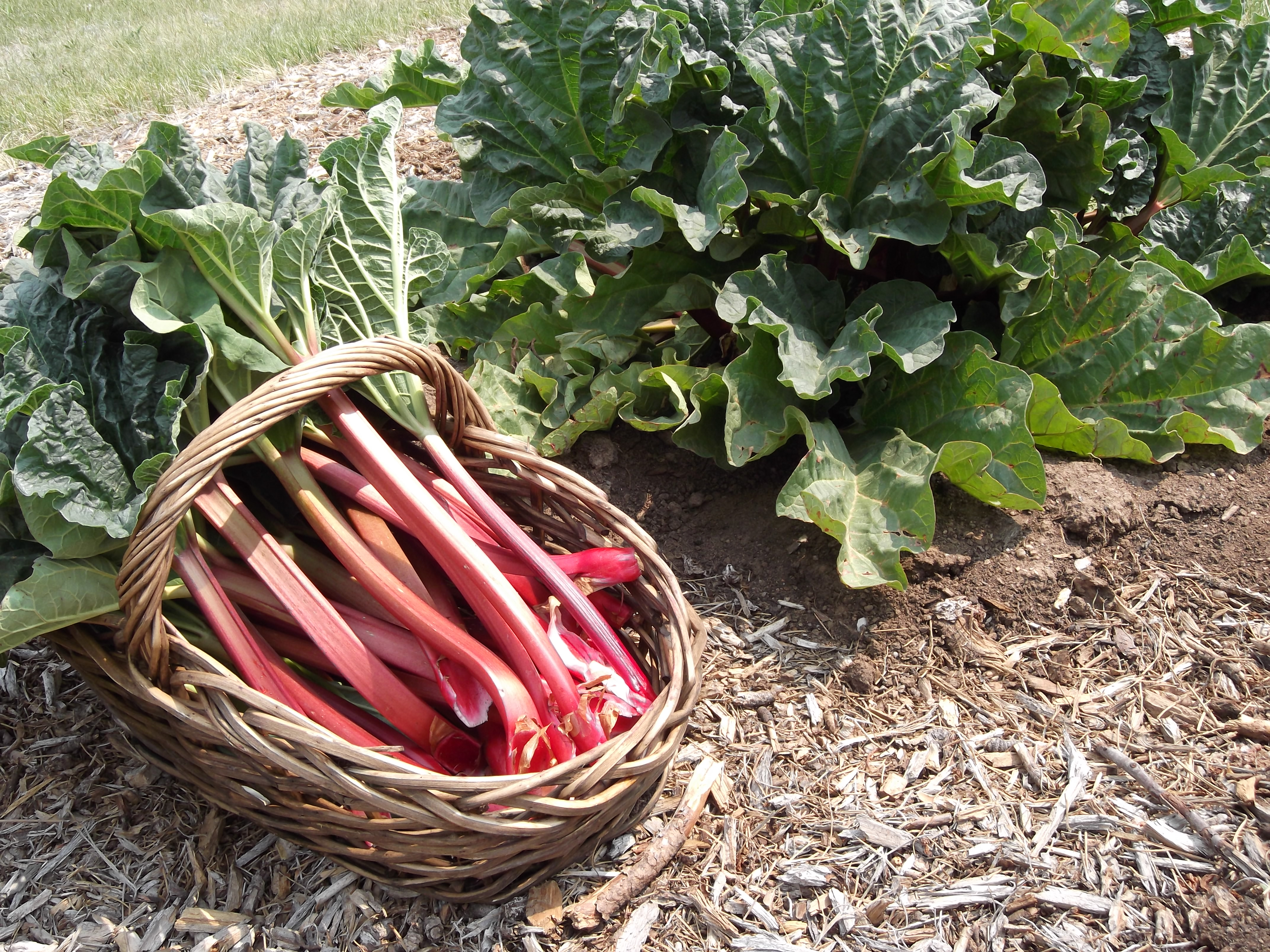
Harvested rhubarb petioles with leaf blades attached

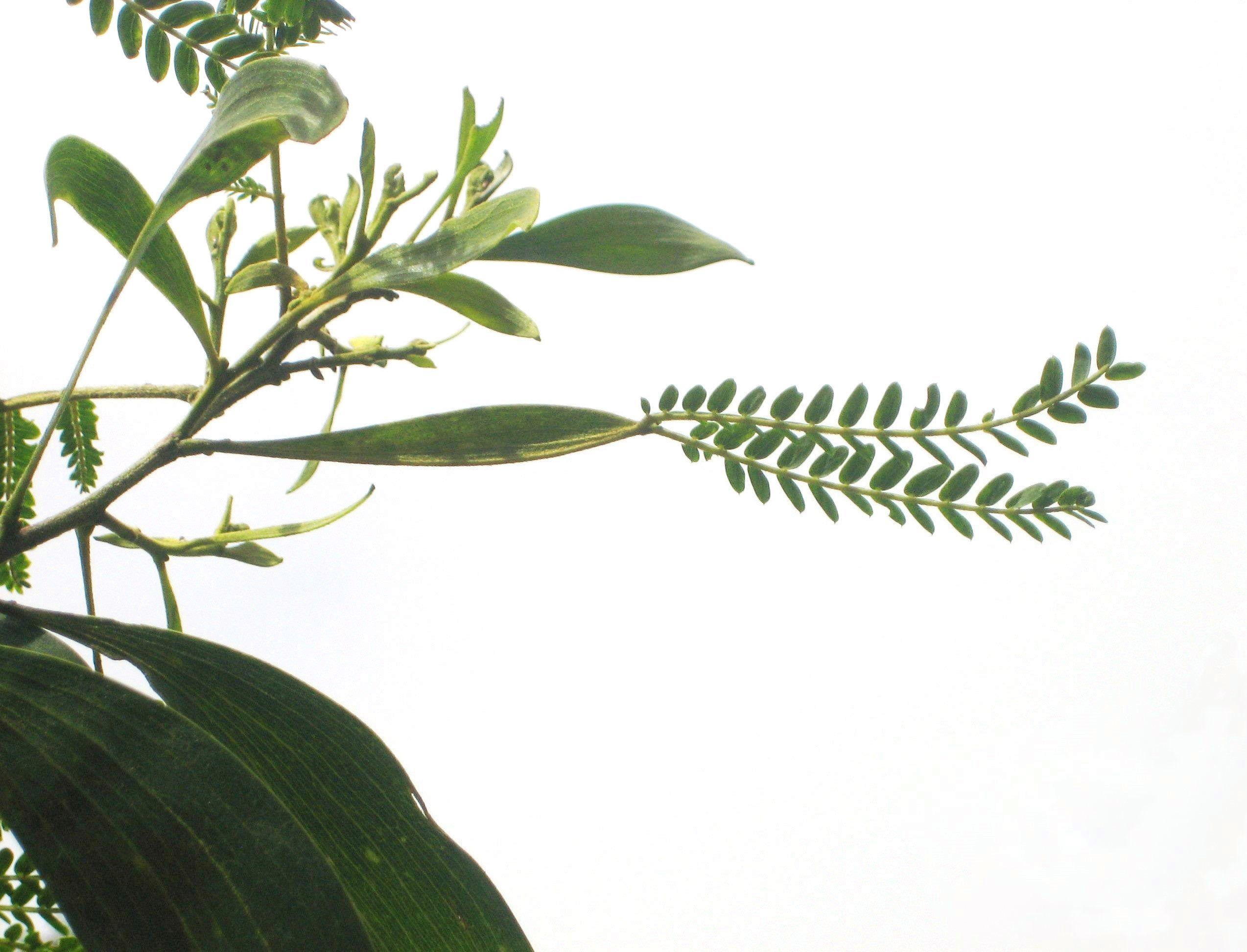
Acacia koa with phyllode between the branch and the compound leaves

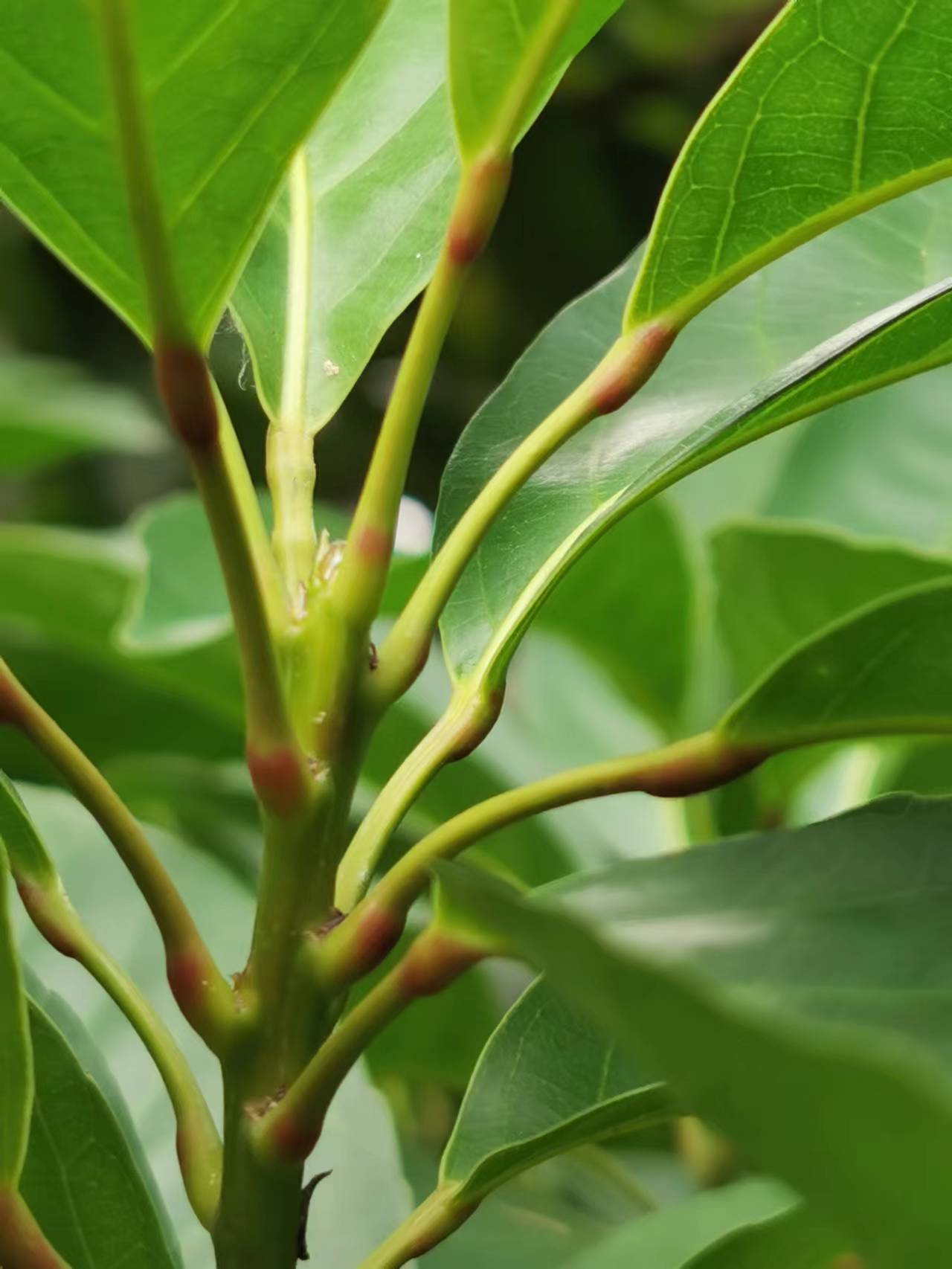
Pulvini at both ends of the petioles of Elaeocarpus multiflorus

The petiole is a stalk that attaches a leaf to the rest of a plant. In some species, it is able to twist the leaf to face the sun, thus optimizing its exposure to sunlight.

In petiolate leaves, the leaf stalk may be long (as in the leaves of celery and rhubarb) or short (e.g. basil). When completely absent, the blade attaches directly to the stem and is said to be sessile or apetiolate. Subpetiolate leaves have an extremely short petiole and may appear sessile. The broomrape family, Orobanchaceae, is an example of a taxon in which the leaves are always sessile. In some other plant groups, such as the speedwell genus Veronica, petiolate and sessile leaves may occur in different species.

In the grasses (Poaceae), the leaves are apetiolate, but the leaf blade may be narrowed at the junction with the leaf sheath to form a pseudopetiole, as in Pseudosasa japonica.

In plants with compound leaves, the leaflets are attached to a continuation of the petiole called the rachis. Each leaflet may be attached to the rachis by a short stalk called the petiolule. There may be swollen regions at either end of the petiole known as pulvina (singular = pulvinus) that are composed of a flexible tissue that allows leaf movement. Pulvina are common in the bean family Fabaceae and the prayer plant family Marantaceae. A pulvinus on a petiolule is called a pulvinulus.

In some plants, the petioles are flattened and widened to become phyllodes (also known as phyllodia or cladophylls) and the true leaves may be reduced or absent. Thus, the phyllode comes to serve the functions of the leaf. Phyllodes are common in the genus Acacia, especially the Australian species, at one time put in Acacia subgenus Phyllodineae.

In Acacia koa, the phyllodes are leathery and thick, allowing the tree to survive stressful environments. The petiole allows partially submerged hydrophytes to have leaves floating at different depths, the petiole being between the node and the stem.

== Etymology ==
'Petiole' comes from Latin petiolus, or 'little foot', 'stem', an alternative diminutive of 'pes', 'foot'. The regular diminutive 'pediculus' is also used for 'foot stalk'.

== Uses ==
In plants such as rhubarb (Rheum rhabarbarum), celery (Apium graveolens), artichokes, and cardoons (Cynara cardunculus), the petioles are cultivated as edible crops. The petiole of rhubarb grows directly from the rhizome and produces the leaf at its end. Botanically, it is categorized as a vegetable but, culinarily, it is more often used as a fruit.

== See also ==
- Hyponastic response
- Pedicel
- Stipule
