= Politics and Excellence =

1990 book by Miriam Galston

Politics and Excellence: The Political Philosophy of Alfarabi
- Authors: Miriam Galston
- Language: English
- Subject: Farabi
- Publisher: Princeton University Press
- Publication date: 1990
- Publication place: United States
- Pages: 252

Politics and Excellence: The Political Philosophy of Alfarabi is a 1990 book by the philosopher Miriam Galston. The book was awarded the Farabi Award.

== Content ==
The author develops a theory accounting how Farabi's major political treatises form a coherent political philosophy. Galston's research focuses on Farabi's views of the nature of happiness, the characteristics of ideal rulers, the best kind of government, and the relationship between political theory and theoretical inquiry.

== Reception ==
The book has been reviewed in the Journal of the History of Philosophy and the International Journal of Middle East Studies.
