= Miriam Galston =

American philosopher

- Born: 1946 (age 79–80)
- Spouse: William A. Galston
- Awards: Farabi Award

Education
- Education: University of Chicago (Ph.D.)
- Thesis: Opinion and Knowledge in Farabi's Understanding of Aristotle's Philosophy (1973)
- Doctoral advisor: Muhsin Mahdi

Philosophical work
- Era: 21st-century philosophy
- Region: Western philosophy
- School: Islamic philosophy
- Institutions: George Washington University
- Main interests: political philosophy

Miriam Galston (born 1946) is an American philosopher and associate professor at The George Washington University Law School. She is known for her research on Farabi and won the Farabi International Award for her book Politics and Excellence.

== Books ==
- Politics and Excellence: The Political Philosophy of Alfarabi, Princeton University Press, 1990; translated into Persian, 2008
