= William Galston =

American author, scholar, and academic

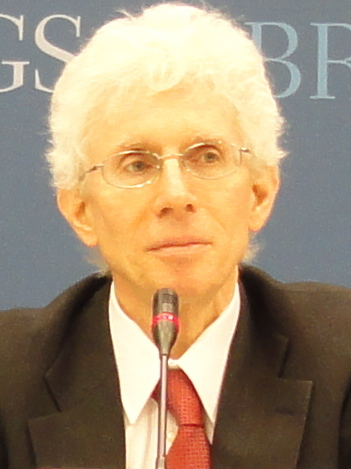
- Born: William Arthur Galston; January 17, 1946 (age 80)
- Education: Cornell University (BA); University of Chicago (MA, PhD)
- Spouse: Miriam Galston

William Arthur Galston (/ˈɡɔːlstən/; born January 17, 1946) is an American author, academic, and political advisor, who holds the Ezra K. Zilkha Chair in Governance Studies and is a senior fellow at the Brookings Institution. Formerly the Saul Stern Professor and Dean at the School of Public Policy at the University of Maryland and a professor of political science at the University of Texas, Austin, Galston specializes in issues of U.S. public philosophy and political institutions, having joined the Brookings Institution on January 1, 2006.

== Family ==
He is the son of Yale University plant physiologist Arthur Galston.

== Career ==
He was deputy assistant for domestic policy to U.S. President Bill Clinton (January 1993 – May 1995). He has also been employed by the presidential campaigns of Al Gore (1988, 2000), Walter Mondale, and John B. Anderson. Since 1995, Galston has served as a founding member of the Board of the National Campaign to Prevent Teen Pregnancy and as chair of the Campaign's Task Force on Religion and Public Values.

Galston had once served in the United States Marine Corps as a sergeant. He was educated at Cornell, where he was a member of the Telluride House, and the University of Chicago, where he got his Ph.D. He then taught for nearly a decade in the Department of Government at the University of Texas. From 1998 until 2005 he was professor of public policy at the University of Maryland. Later he was executive director for the National Commission on Civic Renewal. Galston founded, with support from The Pew Charitable Trusts, the Center for Information and Research on Civic Learning and Engagement. He was also director of the Institute for Philosophy and Public Policy, both located at the University of Maryland.

He has written on questions of political and moral philosophy, U.S. politics and public policy, having produced eight books and more than one hundred articles. His most recent book is Anger, Fear, and Domination: Dark Passions and the Power of Political Speech. Galston is also a co-author of Democracy at Risk: How Political Choices Undermine Citizen Participation and What We Can Do About It, published by the Brookings Press.

Galston became an op-ed columnist for the Wall Street Journal in 2013. In 2014, he continued public commentary on partisan politics.

== Publications ==
- Galston, William A. (William Arthur) (2025). Anger, Fear, Domination: Dark Passions and the Power of Political Speech. New Haven and London: Yale University Press. ISBN 9780300282290. LCCN 2025931241.
- Galston, William A. (William Arthur) (2018). Anti-Pluralism: The Populist Threat to Liberal Democracy. New Haven: Yale University Press. ISBN 9780300228922. LCCN 2017952044.
- Galston, William A.; Hoffenberg, Peter H., eds. (2010). Poverty and morality : religious and secular perspectives. Cambridge; New York: Cambridge University Press. ISBN 9780521763745. LCCN 2010030599.
- Galston, William A. (William Arthur) (2005). Public matters : essays on politics, policy and religion. Lanham, Maryland: Rowman & Littlefield Publishers. ISBN 0742549798. LCCN 2005008940.
- Galston, William A. (William Arthur) (2005). The practice of liberal pluralism. Cambridge, UK; New York: Cambridge University Press. ISBN 0521840341. LCCN 2004046567.
- Galston, William A. (William Arthur) (2002). Liberal pluralism : the implications of value pluralism for political theory and practice. Cambridge, UK; New York: Cambridge University Press. ISBN 0521813042. LCCN 2001043917.
- Galston, William A. (William Arthur) (1995). Rural development in the United States : connecting theory, practice, and possibilities. Karen J. Baehler. Washington, D.C.: Island Press. ISBN 1559633263. LCCN 94041685.
- Chapman, John W.; Galston, William A., eds. (1992). Virtue. New York: New York University Press. ISBN 0814714846. LCCN 92017749.
- Galston, William A. (William Arthur) (1991). Liberal purposes : goods, virtues, and diversity in the liberal state. Cambridge; New York: Cambridge University Press. ISBN 0521410363. LCCN 90025355.
- Rovner, Mark J.; Galston, William A. (1987). One year to go : citizen attitudes in Iowa and New Hampshire : a report on focus groups conducted by the Roosevelt Center for American Policy Studies. Washington, D.C.: The Center. ISBN 0913217093. LCCN 87060758.
- Rovner, Mark J.; Galston, William A. (1987). Southern voices/southern views : a report on focus groups conducted by the Roosevelt Center for American Policy Studies. Washington, DC: The Center. LCCN 87072197.
- Obert, John C.; Galston, William A. (1985). Down-- down-- down-- on the farm : the farm financial crisis, a background paper. Washington, D.C.: Roosevelt Center for American Policy Studies. ISBN 0913217034. LCCN 85060998.
- Galston, William A. (William Arthur) (1985). A tough row to hoe : the 1985 Farm Bill and beyond. Lanham, MD: Hamilton Press; Washington, D.C. : Roosevelt Center for American Policy Studies. ISBN 0819148040. LCCN 85013978.
- Galston, William A. (William Arthur) (1980). Justice and the human good. Chicago: University of Chicago Press. ISBN 0226279634. LCCN 79025945.
- Galston, William A. (William Arthur) (1975). Kant and the problem of history. Chicago: University of Chicago Press. ISBN 0226280446. LCCN 74011620.
- Galston, William A. (William Arthur) (1973). Kant and the problem of history [microform]. ISBN 0226280446. LCCN 89893118.
