= Arthur Galston =

American botanist and bioethicist (1920–2008)

Arthur William Galston
- Born: April 21, 1920; New York, NY
- Died: June 15, 2008 (aged 88); Hamden, Connecticut
- Education: Cornell University; University of Illinois
- Known for: Research that led to Agent Orange and ethical objections to its use; Early data suggesting flavin components of plant photoreceptors, phototropin and cryptochrome
- Spouse: Dale Judith Kuntz (m. June 27, 1941)
- Children: William Arthur Galston; Beth Dale Galston
- Awards: William Clyde DeVane Medal, 1994; Alumni Achievement Award, 2004
- Scientific career
- Workplaces: California Institute of Technology; Yale University; Hebrew University
- Academic advisors: Harry Fuller

Arthur W. Galston (April 21, 1920 – June 15, 2008) was an American plant physiologist and bioethicist. As a plant biologist, Galston studied plant hormones and the effects of light on plant development, particularly phototropism. He identified riboflavin and other flavins as what are called phototropins, photoreceptor proteins for phototropism (the bending of plants toward light), challenging the prevailing view that carotenoids were responsible.

As a graduate student in 1943, Galston studied the use of 2,3,5-triiodobenzoic acid (TIBA) to encourage the flowering of soybeans and noted that high levels had a defoliant effect. The British and U.S. military later developed TIBA into Agent Orange which was employed extensively in Malaya and Vietnam. Galston became a bioethicist, and spoke out against such uses of science. As chairman of Yale's botany department, Galston's ethical objections led President Nixon to end the use of Agent Orange.

== Early life and education ==
Galston was the youngest child of Hyman and Freda Galston. He grew up in a Jewish family in the Brooklyn borough of New York City, impoverished during the Great Depression. Inspired by doctors like microbiologist Paul de Kruif but unable to afford medical school, Galston enrolled at Cornell's Agricultural College which was free for citizens of New York State. He played saxophone in jazz and swing bands to earn living expenses.

Galston's original intention was to attend Cornell Veterinary School after his freshman year. However, under the influence of botany professor Loren C. Petry he came to love botany, turned down an acceptance to Cornell Veterinary School, and earned a B.S. in botany from Cornell instead in 1940.

The University of Illinois offered Galston a teaching assistantship for graduate work, so he went to Champaign-Urbana to study botany and biochemistry. He worked with plant physiologist Harry J. Fuller and botanist Oswald Tippo. Fuller, although nominally his advisor, was sent to South America on war-related research and was unavailable much of the time. Galston completed his M.Sc. in 1942 and his Ph.D. in 1943. It was a wartime requirement that the doctorate be completed in three years.

Galston's Ph.D. dissertation was titled Physiology of flowering, with especial reference to floral initiation in soybeans (1943). His research focused on finding a chemical means to make soybeans flower and fruit earlier, so that they could mature before the end of the growing season. He discovered that 2,3,5-triiodobenzoic acid (TIBA) would speed up the flowering of soybeans. He also noted that in higher concentrations it would defoliate the soybeans by causing them to release ethylene.

== Wartime service ==
During World War II, the Imperial Japanese Army captured most of the world's rubber plantations in British Malaya, causing a natural rubber shortage for the Allied armies. Natural rubber came from the rubber tree, Hevea brasiliensis, a native of South America that was commercially grown in Southeast Asia. The United States government established a research program to develop synthetic rubber, and also encouraged research into botanical alternatives. Guayule, whose sap could be used to produce latex, was considered a possible substitute for rubber. Galston was recommended to James F. Bonner by H. E. Carter, and spent a year working with Bonner at Caltech in Pasadena, California, to develop rubber tires from guayule. By the end of 1944, the U.S. had achieved success with synthetic, petroleum-based rubber, and interest in guayule research lessened.

In July 1944, Galston was drafted into the U.S. Navy as an enlisted man. He ultimately served as Natural Resources officer in Naval Military Government on Okinawa until his discharge in 1946.

== Plant biology ==
After a year as an instructor at Yale University in 1946–1947, Galston returned to the California Institute of Technology to work with James Bonner as a senior research fellow. While at Caltech, Galston made an important discovery. He identified riboflavin as a photoreceptor involved in the bending of plants toward light. This overturned a commonly held belief that carotene was the photoreceptor involved in phototropism.

In 1950 Galston accepted a Guggenheim Fellowship to spend a year working with Hugo Theorell at the Karolinska Institute in Stockholm, Sweden. Upon his return to Caltech in 1951, Galston became tenured as an associate professor. His supporters included Bonner and Frits Warmolt Went, both of whom were senior plant biology researchers at Caltech. He co-taught classes in biology with George Beadle, who was then chairman of the biology department.

In 1955, Galston was offered a full professorship at Yale University by Oswald Tippo, chair of the botany department. In addition to a significant increase in salary and position, it was an opportunity for leadership in an expanding department. Yale, in New Haven, Connecticut, was also closer to family members in New York City and work opportunities for Galston's wife, Dale Judith Kuntz. Galston accepted the offer, and taught at Yale from 1955 onwards.

At Yale, Galston continued to do research in the areas of auxin physiology, photobiology, plant hormones, protoplasts and polyamines. Using microspectrophotometric measurements, he was the first researcher to report that phytochromes were located in plant nuclei, a result that would be confirmed using molecular techniques over 30 years later.

At Yale, increasing amounts of Galston's time were spent in administrative roles. He served as chair of the Departments of Botany and Biology, the university-wide Course of Study Committee, and the Committee on Teaching and Learning. He was also director of the Biological Sciences Division. Following mandatory retirement from the biology department in 1990, he became the Eaton Professor Emeritus in the Department of Molecular, Cellular and Developmental Biology as well as professor emeritus in the School of Forestry & Environmental Studies. He continued to lecture and write after his retirement, in his second career as a bioethicist. He was president of the Botanical Society of America and of the American Society of Plant Physiologists (1962-1963).

Galston supervised 24 Ph.D. and 67 postdoctoral students from around the world. He authored more than 320 papers and several books on plant physiology, as well as co-editing two books on bioethics.

== Bioethics ==
2,3,5-Triiodobenzoic acid

In 1951, biological warfare scientists at Fort Detrick, Maryland, began investigating defoliants based upon Galston's Ph.D. discoveries with TIBA. They eventually produced the toxic defoliant Agent Orange used by the British Air Force during the Malayan Emergency and the U.S. Air Force during the Vietnam War.

Galston was deeply affected by this development of his research. In 1972, he described his viewpoint:

I used to think that one could avoid involvement in the antisocial consequences of science simply by not working on any project that might be turned to evil or destructive ends. I have learned that things are not all that simple, and that almost any scientific finding can be perverted or twisted under appropriate societal pressures. In my view, the only recourse for a scientist concerned about the social consequences of his work is to remain involved with it to the end. His responsibility to society does not cease with publication of a definitive scientific paper. Rather, if his discovery is translated into some impact on the world outside the laboratory, he will, in most instances, want to follow through to see that it is used for constructive rather than anti-human purposes.... Science is now too potent in transforming our world to permit random fallout of the social consequences of scientific discoveries. Some scrutiny and regulation are required, and I believe that scientists must play an important role in any bodies devised to carry out such tasks.

While the United States government argued that herbicides like Agent Orange did not qualify as chemical weapons, Galston asserted that their use was a violation of the United Nations Resolution of December 5, 1966, against the wartime use of “asphyxiating, poisonous or other gases” and “analogous liquids, materials or devices”. He was clear about the devastating impact of their use on the environment, and warned of the likelihood that they were harmful to animals and humans as well as plants. Galston visited Vietnam and China, viewing the environmental damage in Vietnam first-hand.

The complex mangrove community lining the estuaries is virtually completely killed by a single spray with agent Orange and regeneration takes several decades, at least... The complete killing of the mangroves is certain to have a major effect on the ecology of the estuarine zone... The ecological and social effects of our massive use of herbicides have not been properly evaluated, and it is doubtful that they ever will be.

Beginning in 1965, Galston lobbied both his scientific colleagues and the government to stop using Agent Orange. Galston and U.S. geneticist Matthew S. Meselson appealed to the U. S. Department of Defense to investigate the human toxicology of Agent Orange. The research conducted by the Department of Defense led to the discovery that Agent Orange caused birth defects in laboratory rats. In 1971 this information led to U.S. President Richard M. Nixon banning the use of the substance. Later research showed that Agent Orange contained high levels of teratogenic dioxins.

With Ethan Signer of MIT, Galston was one of the first two American scientists invited to visit the People's Republic of China. In 1971, he met Zhou Enlai, then Prime Minister, as well as King Norodom Sihanouk of Cambodia, who then resided in Shanghai. Galston and Singer had applied for visas to visit China. Shortly after the successful ping-pong diplomacy between China and the United States, and while Galston and Singer were visiting North Vietnam, China approved their visas. Galston and Singer immediately traveled to China, where they met with Zhou on May 19, 1971. Zhou sought to address American concerns about China by telling them that while the Pacific Ocean was a small pond for the United States, it "was still a huge ocean for the Chinese to cross." Zhou stated that China had no desire to be a superpower or send soldiers abroad. The visit was reported in The New York Times. Galston's experiences on visits to China led him to write Daily life in People's China (1973).

Galston taught bioethics to Yale undergraduates from 1977 to 2004. In 2003-2004 his introductory bioethics course attracted 460 students, making it one of the most popular courses in Yale College. After his retirement as a biologist in 1990, he became affiliated with Yale's Institution for Social & Policy Studies, where he helped to found the Interdisciplinary Center for Bioethics.

Galston also co-founded the National Senior Conservation Corps (Grey is Green), a non-profit organization dedicated to helping older Americans to create positive environmental change and lead more sustainable lives.

In 1966, Galston successfully nominated Duke Ellington to receive an honorary doctorate from Yale. The Duke received the honor in 1967, but Galston was unable to attend, and did not meet him until 1972.

Arthur Galston died of congestive heart failure on June 15, 2008, in Hamden, Connecticut.

== Family ==
In 1942, Galston married Dale Judith Kuntz, whom he had met at Cornell University. Their son William Arthur Galston became a political scientist. He was an advisor to U.S. President Bill Clinton and is a senior fellow at the Brookings Institution. Their daughter, Beth Galston, is an environmental sculptor who often uses plants as source material.

== Awards and honors ==
- Guggenheim fellow in Sweden, France, and England, awarded 1946, claimed 1950-51
- Fulbright fellow in Australia, 1960-61
- National Science Foundation fellow in England, 1967-68
- merit award from Botanical Society of America, 1969
- Phi Beta Kappa national visiting scholar, 1972-73
- award from New York Academy of Sciences, 1979
- fellow of American Academy of Arts and Sciences, 1979
- LL.D., Iona College, 1980
- LL.D., Hebrew Univ, Jerusalem, 1992
- William Clyde DeVane Medal for lifelong teaching and scholarship, 1994
- Alumni Achievement Award, U. Illinois College of LAS in 2004
- Recognized as a Pioneer Member of the American Society of Plant Biologists.

== Books ==
- Galston, Arthur W.; Bonner, James C. (1952). Principles of Plant Physiology. San Francisco and London: W. H. Freeman & Co. Ltd., reprinted 1959.
- Galston, Arthur W.; Davies, Peter J.; Satter, Ruth L. (1961). The life of the green plant. Englewood Cliffs, N.J.: Prentice-Hall., reprinted 1964, 1968 (as The green plant), 1980, 1990, 1994, 1998.
- Galston, Arthur W.; Davies, Peter J. (1970). Control mechanisms in plant development. Englewood Cliffs N.J: Prentice-Hall. ISBN 9780131718012.
- Galston, Arthur W.; Savage, Jean S. (1973). Daily life in people's China. New York: Crowell. ISBN 9780690231403.; reprinted as Galston, Arthur W. (1981). Green wisdom. New York: Basic Books. ISBN 978-0465027125.
- Galston, Arthur W.; Smith, Terence A., eds. (1985). Polyamines in plants. Dordrecht, Netherlands: M. Nijhoff/W. Junk. ISBN 9789024732456.
- Galston, Arthur W. (1994). Life processes of plants. New York: Scientific American Library. ISBN 978-0716750444.
- Galston, Arthur W.; Shurr, Emily G., eds. (2001). New Dimensions in Bioethics Science, Ethics and the Formulation of Public Policy. Boston, MA: Springer US. ISBN 978-1-4615-1591-3.
- Galston, Arthur W. (2005). Expanding Horizons in Bioethics. New York: Springer. ISBN 978-1402030611.
