= Plant hormone =

Chemical compounds that regulate plant growth and development

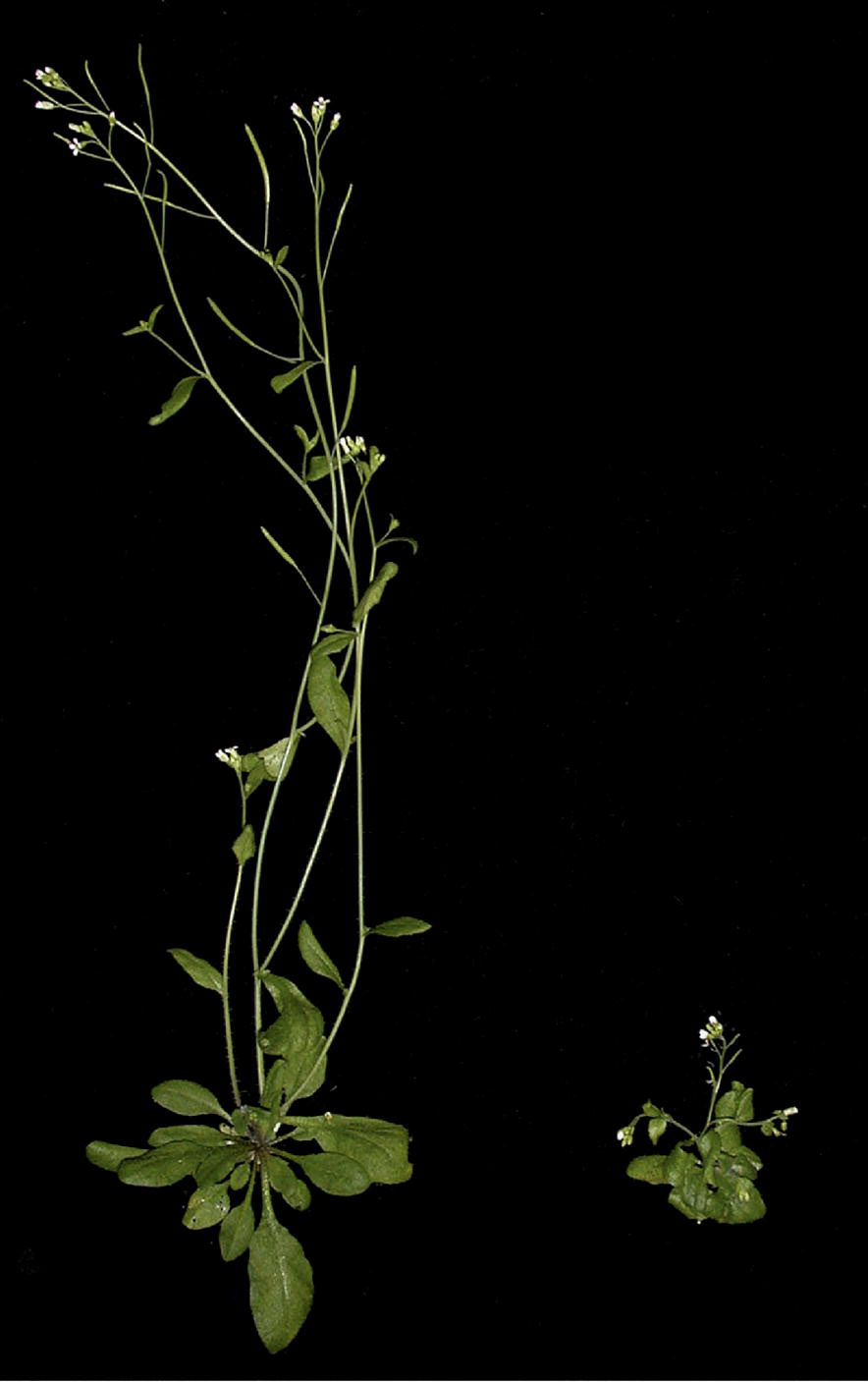
Lack of the plant hormone auxin can cause abnormal growth (right)

Plant hormones (or phytohormones) are signal molecules, produced within plants, that occur in extremely low concentrations. Plant hormones control all aspects of plant growth and development, including embryogenesis, the regulation of organ size, pathogen defense, stress tolerance and reproductive development. Unlike in animals (in which hormone production is restricted to specialized glands) each plant cell is capable of producing hormones. Went and Thimann coined the term "phytohormone" and used it in the title of their 1937 book.

Phytohormones occur across the plant kingdom, and even in algae, where they have similar functions to those seen in vascular plants ("higher plants"). Some phytohormones also occur in microorganisms, such as unicellular fungi and bacteria, however in these cases they do not play a hormonal role and can better be regarded as secondary metabolites.

== Characteristics ==
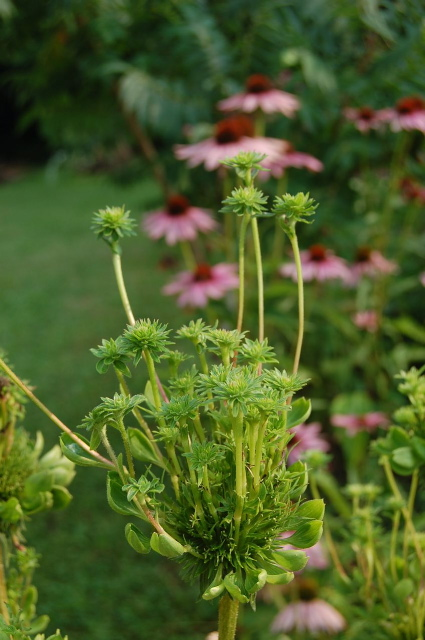
Phyllody on a purple coneflower (Echinacea purpurea), a plant development abnormality where leaf-like structures replace flower organs. It can be caused by hormonal imbalance, among other reasons.

The word hormone is derived from Greek, meaning set in motion. Early in the study of plant hormones, "phytohormone" was the commonly used term, but its use is less widely applied now. Plant hormones affect gene expression and transcription levels, cellular division, and growth. They are naturally produced within plants, though very similar chemicals are produced by fungi and bacteria that can also affect plant growth. Both natural hormones and many synthetic compounds are used in agriculture as plant growth regulators (PGRs) to regulate the growth of cultivated plants, weeds, and in vitro-grown plants and plant cells.

Plant hormones are not nutrients, but chemicals that in small amounts promote and influence the growth, development, and differentiation of cells and tissues. The biosynthesis of plant hormones within plant tissues is often diffuse and not always localized. Plants lack glands to produce and store hormones, because, unlike animals—which have two circulatory systems (lymphatic and cardiovascular) —plants use more passive means to move chemicals around their bodies. Plants utilize simple chemicals as hormones, which move more easily through their tissues. They are often produced and used on a local basis within the plant body. Plant cells produce hormones that affect even different regions of the cell producing the hormone.

Hormones are transported within the plant by utilizing four types of movements. For localized movement, cytoplasmic streaming within cells and slow diffusion of ions and molecules between cells are utilized. Vascular tissues are used to move hormones from one part of the plant to another; these include sieve tubes or phloem that move sugars from the leaves to the roots and flowers, and xylem that moves water and mineral solutes from the roots to the foliage.

Not all plant cells respond to hormones, but those cells that do are programmed to respond at specific points in their growth cycle. The greatest effects occur at specific stages during the cell's life, with diminished effects occurring before or after this period. Plants need hormones at very specific times during plant growth and at specific locations. They also need to disengage the effects that hormones have when they are no longer needed. The production of hormones occurs very often at sites of active growth within the meristems, before cells have fully differentiated. After production, they are sometimes moved to other parts of the plant, where they cause an immediate effect; or they can be stored in cells to be released later. Plants use different pathways to regulate internal hormone quantities and moderate their effects; they can regulate the amount of chemicals used to biosynthesize hormones. They can store them in cells, inactivate them, or cannibalise already-formed hormones by conjugating them with carbohydrates, amino acids, or peptides. Plants can also break down hormones chemically, effectively destroying them. Plant hormones frequently regulate the concentrations of other plant hormones. Plants also move hormones around the plant diluting their concentrations.

The concentration of hormones required for plant responses are very low (10^{−6} to 10^{−5} mol/L). Because of these low concentrations, it has been very difficult to study plant hormones, and only since the late 1970s have scientists been able to start piecing together their effects and relationships to plant physiology. Much of the early work on plant hormones involved studying plants that were genetically deficient in one or involved the use of tissue-cultured plants grown in vitro that were subjected to differing ratios of hormones, and the resultant growth compared. The earliest scientific observation and study dates to the 1880s; the determination and observation of plant hormones and their identification was spread out over the next 70 years.

Synergism in plant hormones refers to the how of two or more hormones result in an effect that is more than the individual effects. For example, auxins and cytokinins often act in cooperation during cellular division and differentiation. Both hormones are key to cell cycle regulation, but when they come together, their synergistic interactions can enhance cell proliferation and organogenesis more effectively than either could in isolation.

== Classes ==
Different hormones can be sorted into different classes, depending on their chemical structures. Within each class of hormone, chemical structures can vary, but all members of the same class have similar physiological effects. Initial research into plant hormones identified five major classes: abscisic acid, auxins, gibberellins, cytokinins and ethylene. This list was later expanded, and brassinosteroids, jasmonates, salicylic acid, and strigolactones are now also considered major plant hormones. Additionally there are several other compounds that serve functions similar to the major hormones, but their status as bona fide hormones is still debated.

=== Abscisic acid ===
Abscisic acid

Abscisic acid (also called ABA) is one of the most important plant growth inhibitors. It was discovered and researched under two different names, dormin and abscicin II, before its chemical properties were fully known. Once it was determined that the two compounds are the same, it was named abscisic acid. The name refers to the fact that it is found in high concentrations in newly abscissed or freshly fallen leaves.

This class of PGR is composed of one chemical compound normally produced in the leaves of plants, originating from chloroplasts, especially when plants are under stress. In general, it acts as an inhibitory chemical compound that affects bud growth, and seed and bud dormancy. It mediates changes within the apical meristem, causing bud dormancy and the alteration of the last set of leaves into protective bud covers. Since it was found in freshly abscissed leaves, it was initially thought to play a role in the processes of natural leaf drop, but further research has disproven this. In plant species from temperate parts of the world, abscisic acid plays a role in leaf and seed dormancy by inhibiting growth, but, as it is dissipated from seeds or buds, growth begins. In other plants, as ABA levels decrease, growth then commences as gibberellin levels increase. Without ABA, buds and seeds would start to grow during warm periods in winter and would be killed when it froze again. Since ABA dissipates slowly from the tissues and its effects take time to be offset by other plant hormones, there is a delay in physiological pathways that provides some protection from premature growth. Abscisic acid accumulates within seeds during fruit maturation, preventing seed germination within the fruit or before winter. Abscisic acid's effects are degraded within plant tissues during cold temperatures or by its removal by water washing in and out of the tissues, releasing the seeds and buds from dormancy.

ABA exists in all parts of the plant, and its concentration within any tissue seems to mediate its effects and function as a hormone; its degradation, or more properly catabolism, within the plant affects metabolic reactions and cellular growth and production of other hormones. Plants start life as a seed with high ABA levels. Just before the seed germinates, ABA levels decrease; during germination and early growth of the seedling, ABA levels decrease even more. As plants begin to produce shoots with fully functional leaves, ABA levels begin to increase again, slowing down cellular growth in more "mature" areas of the plant. Stress from water or predation affects ABA production and catabolism rates, mediating another cascade of effects that trigger specific responses from targeted cells. Scientists are still piecing together the complex interactions and effects of this and other phytohormones.

In plants under water stress, ABA plays a role in closing the stomata. Soon after plants are water-stressed and the roots are deficient in water, a signal moves up to the leaves, causing the formation of ABA precursors there, which then move to the roots. The roots then release ABA, which is translocated to the foliage through the vascular system and modulates potassium and sodium uptake within the guard cells, which then lose turgidity, closing the stomata.

=== Auxins ===
The auxin, indole-3-acetic acid

Auxins are compounds that positively influence cell enlargement, bud formation, and root initiation. They also promote the production of other hormones and, in conjunction with cytokinins, control the growth of stems, roots, and fruits, and convert stems into flowers. Auxins were the first class of growth regulators discovered. A Dutch Biologist Frits Warmolt Went first described auxins. They affect cell elongation by altering cell wall plasticity. They stimulate cambium, a subtype of meristem cells, to divide, and in stems cause secondary xylem to differentiate.

Auxins act to inhibit the growth of buds lower down the stems in a phenomenon known as apical dominance, and also to promote lateral and adventitious root development and growth. Leaf abscission is initiated by the growing point of a plant ceasing to produce auxins. Auxins in seeds regulate specific protein synthesis, as they develop within the flower after pollination, causing the flower to develop a fruit to contain the developing seeds.

In large concentrations, auxins are often toxic to plants; they are most toxic to dicots and less so to monocots. Because of this property, synthetic auxin herbicides including 2,4-dichlorophenoxyacetic acid (2,4-D) and 2,4,5-trichlorophenoxyacetic acid (2,4,5-T) have been developed and used for weed control by defoliation. Auxins, especially 1-naphthaleneacetic acid (NAA) and indole-3-butyric acid (IBA), are also commonly applied to stimulate root growth when taking cuttings of plants. The most common auxin found in plants is indole-3-acetic acid (IAA).

=== Brassinosteroids ===
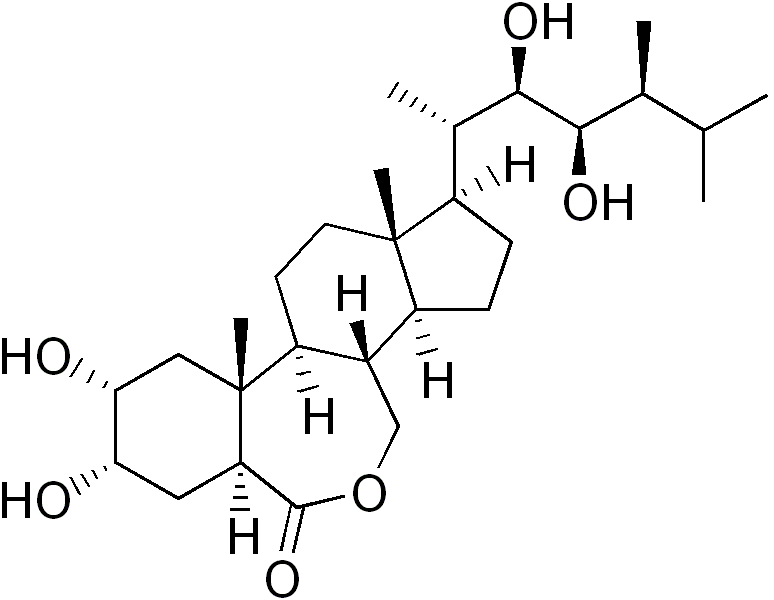
Brassinolide, a major brassinosteroid

Brassinosteroids (BRs) are a class of polyhydroxysteroids, the only example of steroid-based hormones in plants. Brassinosteroids control cell elongation and division, gravitropism, resistance to stress, and xylem differentiation. They inhibit root growth and leaf abscission. Brassinolide was the first brassinosteroid to be identified and was isolated from extracts of rapeseed (Brassica napus) pollen in 1979. Brassinosteroids are a class of steroidal phytohormones in plants that regulate numerous physiological processes. This plant hormone was identified by Mitchell et al. who extracted ingredients from Brassica pollen only to find that the extracted ingredients' main active component was Brassinolide. This finding meant the discovery of a new class of plant hormones called Brassinosteroids. These hormones act very similarly to animal steroidal hormones by promoting growth and development.

In plants these steroidal hormones play an important role in cell elongation via BR signaling. The brassinosteroids receptor brassinosteroid insensitive 1 (BRI1) is the main receptor for this signaling pathway. This BRI1 receptor was found by Clouse et al. who made the discovery by inhibiting BR and comparing it to the wildtype in Arabidopsis. The BRI1 mutant displayed several problems associated with growth and development such as dwarfism, reduced cell elongation and other physical alterations. These findings mean that plants properly expressing brassinosteroids grow more than their mutant counterparts. Brassinosteroids bind to BRI1 localized at the plasma membrane which leads to a signal cascade that further regulates cell elongation. This signal cascade however is not entirely understood at this time. What is believed to be happening is that BR binds to the BAK1 complex which leads to a phosphorylation cascade. This phosphorylation cascade then causes BIN2 to be deactivated which causes the release of transcription factors. These released transcription factors then bind to DNA that leads to growth and developmental processes and allows plants to respond to abiotic stressors.

=== Cytokinins ===
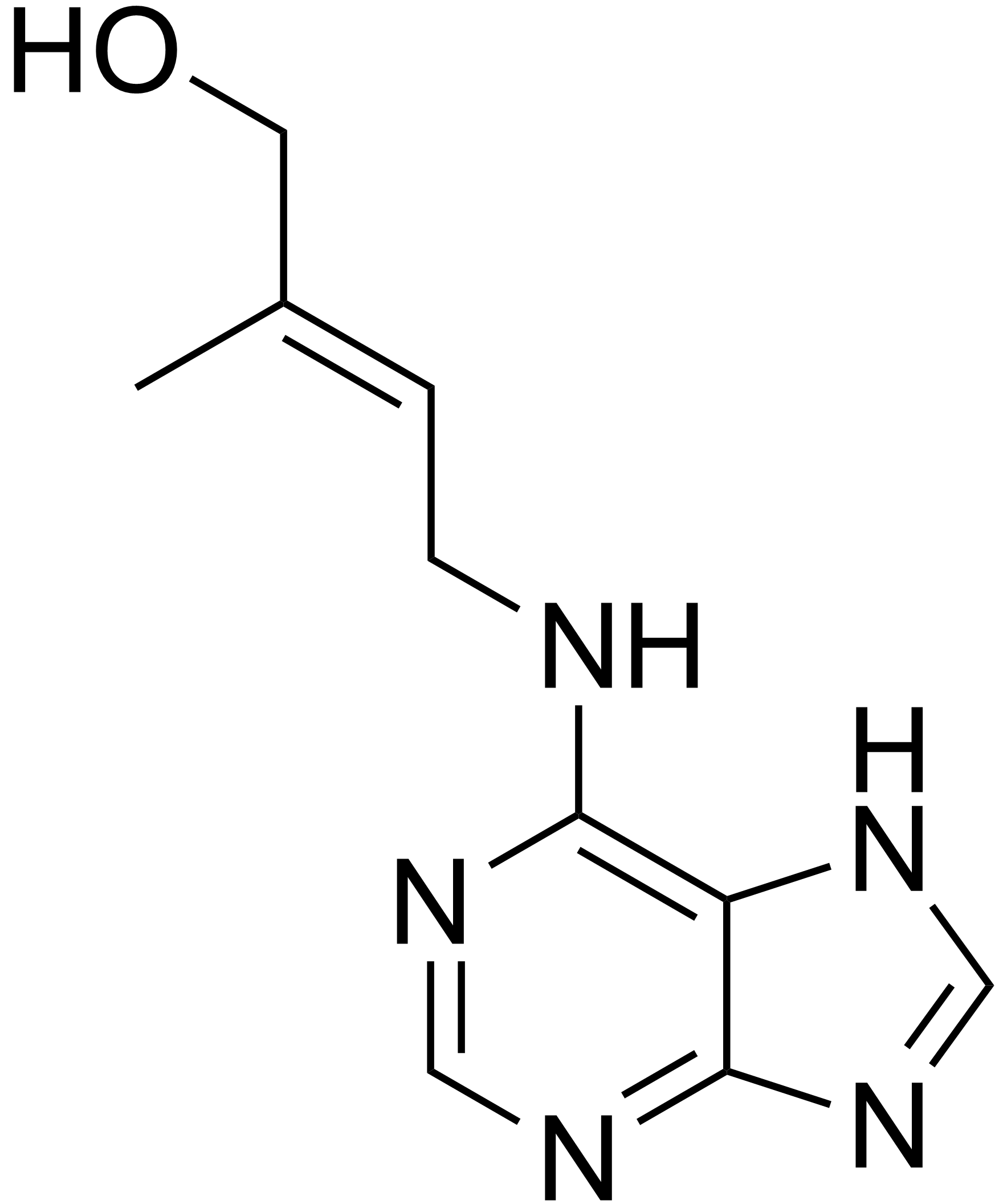
Zeatin, a cytokinin

Cytokinins (CKs) are a group of chemicals that influence cell division and shoot formation. They also help delay senescence of tissues, are responsible for mediating auxin transport throughout the plant, and affect internodal length and leaf growth. They were called kinins in the past when they were first isolated from yeast cells. Cytokinins and auxins often work together, and the ratios of these two groups of plant hormones affect most major growth periods during a plant's lifetime. Cytokinins counter the apical dominance induced by auxins; in conjunction with ethylene, they promote abscission of leaves, flower parts, and fruits.

Among the plant hormones, the three that are known to help with immunological interactions are ethylene (ET), salicylates (SA), and jasmonates (JA), however more research has gone into identifying the role that cytokinins play in this. Evidence suggests that cytokinins delay the interactions with pathogens, showing signs that they could induce resistance toward these pathogenic bacteria. Accordingly, there are higher CK levels in plants that have increased resistance to pathogens compared to those which are more susceptible. For example, pathogen resistance involving cytokinins was tested using the Arabidopsis species by treating them with naturally occurring CK (trans-zeatin) to see their response to the bacteria Pseudomonas syringa. Tobacco studies reveal that over expression of CK inducing IPT genes yields increased resistance whereas over expression of CK oxidase yields increased susceptibility to pathogen, namely P. syringae.

While there's not much of a relationship between this hormone and physical plant behavior, there are behavioral changes that go on inside the plant in response to it. Cytokinin defense effects can include the establishment and growth of microbes (delay leaf senescence), reconfiguration of secondary metabolism or even induce the production of new organs such as galls or nodules. These organs and their corresponding processes are all used to protect the plants against biotic/abiotic factors.

=== Ethylene ===
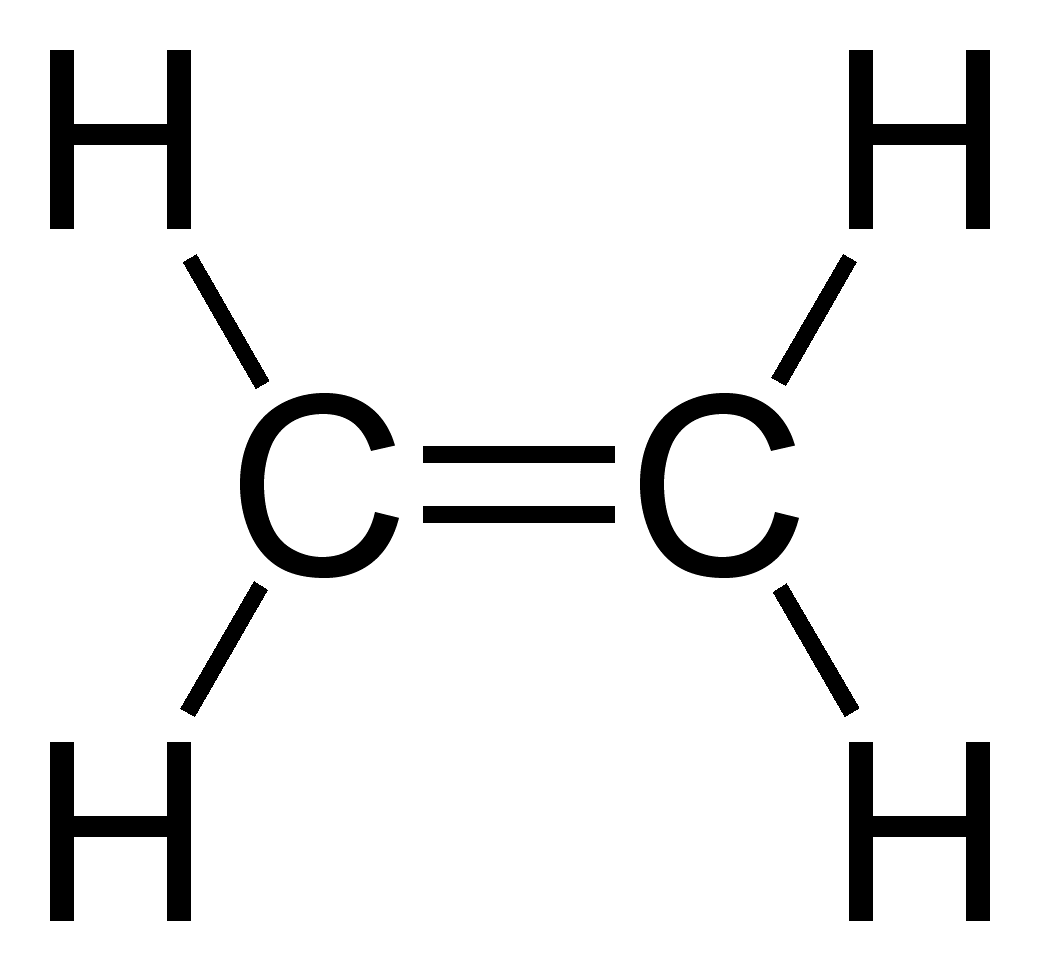
Ethylene

Unlike the other major plant hormones, ethylene is a gas and a very simple organic compound, consisting of just six atoms. It forms through the breakdown of methionine, an amino acid which is in all cells. Ethylene has very limited solubility in water and therefore does not accumulate within the cell, typically diffusing out of the cell and escaping the plant. Its effectiveness as a plant hormone is dependent on its rate of production versus its rate of escaping into the atmosphere. Ethylene is produced at a faster rate in rapidly growing and dividing cells, especially in darkness. New growth and newly germinated seedlings produce more ethylene than can escape the plant, which leads to elevated amounts of ethylene, inhibiting leaf expansion (see hyponastic response).

As the new shoot is exposed to light, reactions mediated by phytochrome in the plant's cells produce a signal for ethylene production to decrease, allowing leaf expansion. Ethylene affects cell growth and cell shape; when a growing shoot or root hits an obstacle while underground, ethylene production greatly increases, preventing cell elongation and causing the stem to swell. The resulting thicker stem is stronger and less likely to buckle under pressure as it presses against the object impeding its path to the surface. If the shoot does not reach the surface and the ethylene stimulus becomes prolonged, it affects the stem's natural geotropic response, which is to grow upright, allowing it to grow around an object. Studies seem to indicate that ethylene affects stem diameter and height: when stems of trees are subjected to wind, causing lateral stress, greater ethylene production occurs, resulting in thicker, sturdier tree trunks and branches.

Ethylene also affects fruit ripening. Normally, when the seeds are mature, ethylene production increases and builds up within the fruit, resulting in a climacteric event just before seed dispersal. The nuclear protein Ethylene Insensitive2 (EIN2) is regulated by ethylene production, and, in turn, regulates other hormones including ABA and stress hormones. Ethylene diffusion out of plants is strongly inhibited underwater. This increases internal concentrations of the gas. In numerous aquatic and semi-aquatic species (e.g. Callitriche platycarpus, rice, and Rumex palustris), the accumulated ethylene strongly stimulates upward elongation. This response is an important mechanism for the adaptive escape from submergence that avoids asphyxiation by returning the shoot and leaves to contact with the air whilst allowing the release of entrapped ethylene. At least one species (Potamogeton pectinatus) has been found to be incapable of making ethylene while retaining a conventional morphology. This suggests ethylene is a true regulator rather than being a requirement for building a plant's basic body plan.

=== Gibberellins ===
Gibberellin A1

Gibberellins (GAs) include a large range of chemicals that are produced naturally within plants and by fungi. They were first discovered when Japanese researchers, including Eiichi Kurosawa, noticed a chemical produced by a fungus called Gibberella fujikuroi that produced abnormal growth in rice plants. It was later discovered that GAs are also produced by the plants themselves and control multiple aspects of development across the life cycle. The synthesis of GA is strongly upregulated in seeds at germination and its presence is required for germination to occur. In seedlings and adults, GAs strongly promote cell elongation. GAs also promote the transition between vegetative and reproductive growth and are also required for pollen function during fertilization.

Gibberellins breaks the dormancy (in active stage) in seeds and buds and helps increasing the height of the plant. It helps in the growth of the stem.

=== Jasmonates ===
Jasmonic acid

Jasmonates (JAs) are lipid-based hormones that were originally isolated from jasmine oil. JAs are especially important in the plant response to attack from herbivores and necrotrophic pathogens. The most active JA in plants is jasmonic acid. Jasmonic acid can be further metabolized into methyl jasmonate (MeJA), which is a volatile organic compound. This unusual property means that MeJA can act as an airborne signal to communicate herbivore attack to other distant leaves within one plant and even as a signal to neighboring plants. In addition to their role in defense, JAs are also believed to play roles in seed germination, the storage of protein in seeds, and root growth.

JAs have been shown to interact in the signalling pathway of other hormones in a mechanism described as "crosstalk." The hormone classes can have both negative and positive effects on each other's signal processes.

Jasmonic acid methyl ester (JAME) has been shown to regulate genetic expression in plants. They act in signalling pathways in response to herbivory, and upregulate expression of defense genes. Jasmonyl-isoleucine (JA-Ile) accumulates in response to herbivory, which causes an upregulation in defense gene expression by freeing up transcription factors.

Jasmonate mutants are more readily consumed by herbivores than wild type plants, indicating that JAs play an important role in the execution of plant defense. When herbivores are moved around leaves of wild type plants, they reach similar masses to herbivores that consume only mutant plants, implying the effects of JAs are localized to sites of herbivory. Studies have shown that there is significant crosstalk between defense pathways.

=== Salicylic acid ===
Salicylic acid

Salicylic acid (SA) is a hormone with a structure related to benzoic acid and phenol. It was originally isolated from an extract of white willow bark (Salix alba) and is of great interest to human medicine, as it is the precursor of the painkiller aspirin. In plants, SA plays a critical role in the defense against biotrophic pathogens. In a similar manner to JA, SA can also become methylated. Like MeJA, methyl salicylate is volatile and can act as a long-distance signal to neighboring plants to warn of pathogen attack. In addition to its role in defense, SA is also involved in the response of plants to abiotic stress, particularly from drought, extreme temperatures, heavy metals, and osmotic stress.

Salicylic acid (SA) serves as a key hormone in plant innate immunity, including resistance in both local and systemic tissue upon biotic attacks, hypersensitive responses, and cell death. Some of the SA influences on plants include seed germination, cell growth, respiration, stomatal closure, senescence-associated gene expression, responses to abiotic and biotic stresses, basal thermo tolerance and fruit yield. A possible role of salicylic acid in signaling disease resistance was first demonstrated by injecting leaves of resistant tobacco with SA. The result was that injecting SA stimulated pathogenesis related (PR) protein accumulation and enhanced resistance to tobacco mosaic virus (TMV) infection. Exposure to pathogens causes a cascade of reactions in the plant cells. SA biosynthesis is increased via isochorismate synthase (ICS) and phenylalanine ammonia-lyase (PAL) pathway in plastids. It was observed that during plant-microbe interactions, as part of the defense mechanisms, SA is initially accumulated at the local infected tissue and then spread all over the plant to induce systemic acquired resistance at non-infected distal parts of the plant. Therefore with increased internal concentration of SA, plants were able to build resistant barriers for pathogens and other adverse environmental conditions.

=== Strigolactones ===
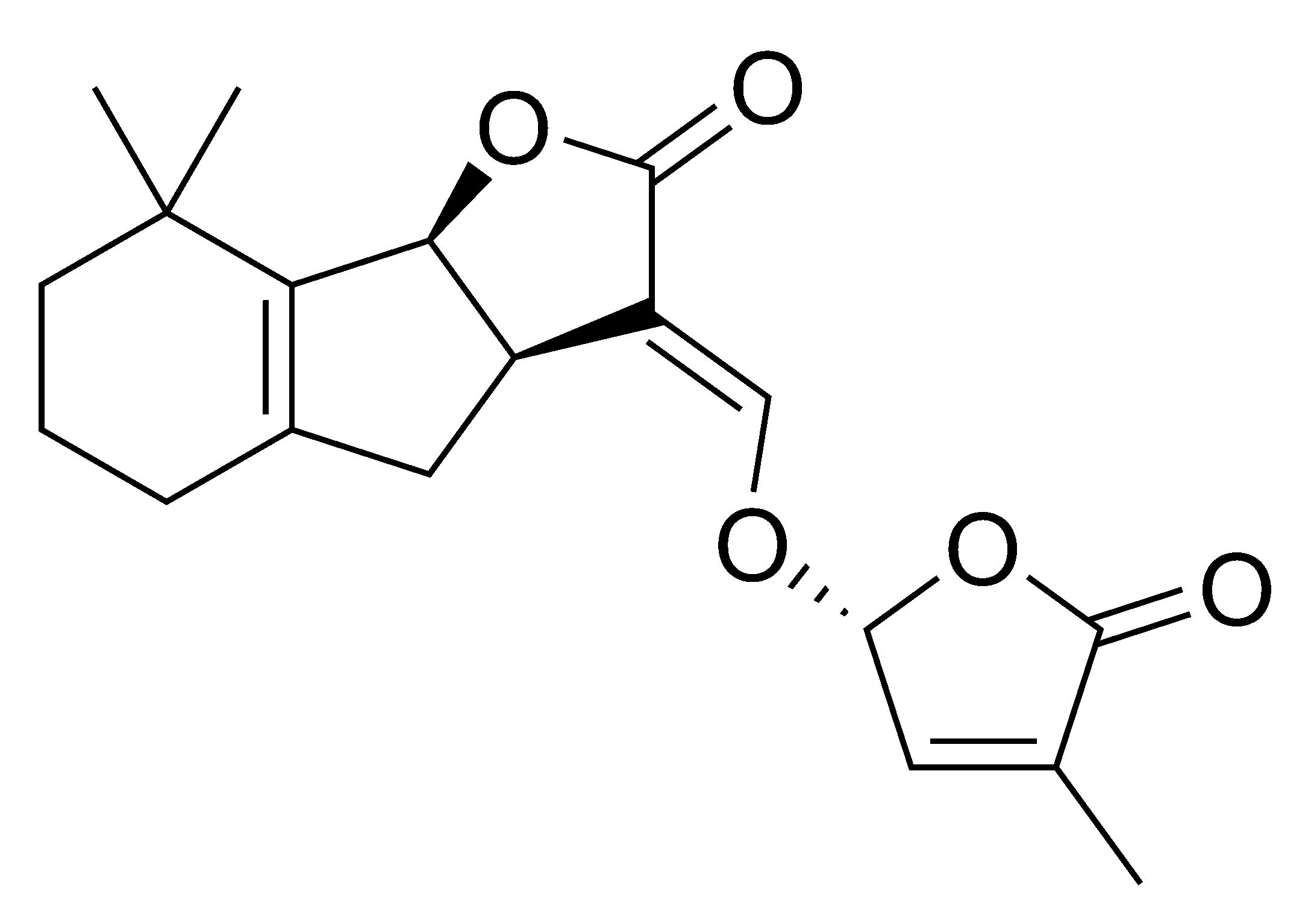
5-deoxystrigol, a strigolactone

Strigolactones (SLs) were originally discovered through studies of the germination of the parasitic weed Striga lutea. It was found that the germination of Striga species was stimulated by the presence of a compound exuded by the roots of its host plant. It was later shown that SLs that are exuded into the soil also promote the growth of symbiotic arbuscular mycorrhizal (AM) fungi. More recently, another role of SLs was identified in the inhibition of shoot branching. This discovery of the role of SLs in shoot branching led to a dramatic increase in the interest in these hormones, and it has since been shown that SLs play important roles in leaf senescence, phosphate starvation response, salt tolerance, and light signalling.

=== Other known hormones ===
Other identified plant growth regulators include:

- Plant peptide hormones – encompasses all small secreted peptides that are involved in cell-to-cell signaling. These small peptide hormones play crucial roles in plant growth and development, including defense mechanisms, the control of cell division and expansion, and pollen self-incompatibility. The small peptide CLE25 is known to act as a long-distance signal to communicate water stress sensed in the roots to the stomata in the leaves.
- Polyamines – are strongly basic molecules with low molecular weight that have been found in all organisms studied thus far. They are essential for plant growth and development and affect the process of mitosis and meiosis. In plants, polyamines have been linked to the control of senescence and programmed cell death.
- Nitric oxide (NO) – serves as signal in hormonal and defense responses (e.g. stomatal closure, root development, germination, nitrogen fixation, cell death, stress response). NO can be produced by a yet undefined NO synthase, a special type of nitrite reductase, nitrate reductase, mitochondrial cytochrome c oxidase or non enzymatic processes and regulate plant cell organelle functions (e.g. ATP synthesis in chloroplasts and mitochondria).
- Karrikins – are not plant hormones as they are not produced by plants themselves but are rather found in the smoke of burning plant material. Karrikins can promote seed germination in many species. The finding that plants which lack the receptor of karrikin receptor show several developmental phenotypes (enhanced biomass accumulation and increased sensitivity to drought) have led some to speculate on the existence of an as yet unidentified karrikin-like endogenous hormone in plants. The cellular karrikin signalling pathway shares many components with the strigolactone signalling pathway.
- Triacontanol – a fatty alcohol that acts as a growth stimulant, especially initiating new basal breaks in the rose family. It is found in alfalfa (lucerne), bee's wax, and some waxy leaf cuticles.

=== Seed dormancy ===
Plant hormones affect seed germination and dormancy by acting on different parts of the seed.

Embryo dormancy is characterized by a high ABA:GA ratio, whereas the seed has high abscisic acid sensitivity and low GA sensitivity. In order to release the seed from this type of dormancy and initiate seed germination, an alteration in hormone biosynthesis and degradation toward a low ABA/GA ratio, along with a decrease in ABA sensitivity and an increase in GA sensitivity, must occur.

ABA controls embryo dormancy, and GA embryo germination. Seed coat dormancy involves the mechanical restriction of the seed coat. This, along with a low embryo growth potential, effectively produces seed dormancy. GA releases this dormancy by increasing the embryo growth potential, and/or weakening the seed coat so the radical of the seedling can break through the seed coat. Different types of seed coats can be made up of living or dead cells, and both types can be influenced by hormones; those composed of living cells are acted upon after seed formation, whereas the seed coats composed of dead cells can be influenced by hormones during the formation of the seed coat. ABA affects testa or seed coat growth characteristics, including thickness, and effects the GA-mediated embryo growth potential. These conditions and effects occur during the formation of the seed, often in response to environmental conditions. Hormones also mediate endosperm dormancy: Endosperm in most seeds is composed of living tissue that can actively respond to hormones generated by the embryo. The endosperm often acts as a barrier to seed germination, playing a part in seed coat dormancy or in the germination process. Living cells respond to and also affect the ABA:GA ratio, and mediate cellular sensitivity; GA thus increases the embryo growth potential and can promote endosperm weakening. GA also affects both ABA-independent and ABA-inhibiting processes within the endosperm.

== Use in horticulture ==
Synthetic plant hormones or PGRs are used in a number of different techniques involving plant propagation from cuttings, grafting, micropropagation and tissue culture. Most commonly they are commercially available as "rooting hormone powder".

The propagation of plants by cuttings of fully developed leaves, stems, or roots is performed by gardeners utilizing auxin as a rooting compound applied to the cut surface; the auxins are taken into the plant and promote root initiation. In grafting, auxin promotes callus tissue formation, which joins the surfaces of the graft together. In micropropagation, different PGRs are used to promote multiplication and then rooting of new plantlets. In the tissue-culturing of plant cells, PGRs are used to produce callus growth, multiplication, and rooting.

== Use in agriculture ==
Plant regulators (PRs) or plant growth regulators (PGRs) are compounds, both naturally occurring and synthetic, used in agriculture to modify the behaviour of plants. They can be used to increase or inhibit growth, influence flowering and/or fruit growth, alter the maturation, or reduce abiotic stress. The compendium of pesticide common names lists 103 plant growth regulators, many of which have been removed from the market.

When used in field conditions, plant hormones or mixtures that include them can be applied as biostimulants.

== Human use ==
=== Salicylic acid ===
Willow bark has been used for centuries as a painkiller. The active ingredient in willow bark that provides these effects is the hormone salicylic acid (SA). In 1899, the pharmaceutical company Bayer began marketing a derivative of SA as the drug aspirin. In addition to its use as a painkiller, SA is also used in topical treatments of several skin conditions, including acne, warts and psoriasis. Another derivative of SA, sodium salicylate has been found to suppress proliferation of lymphoblastic leukemia, prostate, breast, and melanoma human cancer cells.

=== Jasmonic acid ===
Jasmonic acid (JA) can induce death in lymphoblastic leukemia cells. Methyl jasmonate (a derivative of JA, also found in plants) has been shown to inhibit proliferation in a number of cancer cell lines, although there is still debate over its use as an anti-cancer drug, due to its potential negative effects on healthy cells.

== See also ==
- Forchlorfenuron
- Phytoestrogen
- Phytoandrogen
- Chlormequat
- Glyphosine
