= Hyponastic response =

Upward bending of plant leaves due to growth in the leaf stalk

In plant biology, the hyponastic response is a nastic movement characterized by an upward bending of leaves or other plant parts, resulting from accelerated growth of the lower side of the petiole in comparison to its upper part. This can be observed in many terrestrial plants and it is regulated by plant hormone ethylene. The plant’s root senses the water excess and produces 1-aminocyclopropane-1-carboxylic acid which then is converted into ethylene, regulating this process.

Submerged plants often show a hyponastic response, where the upward bending of the leaves and the elongation of the petioles might help the plant to restore normal gas exchange with the atmosphere.

Plants that are exposed to elevated ethylene levels in experimental set-ups showed a hyponastic response.
