= Biotic stress =

Biological harm to an organism

Biotic stress is stress that occurs as a result of damage done to an organism by other living organisms, such as bacteria, viruses, fungi, parasites, beneficial and harmful insects, weeds, and cultivated or native plants. It is different from abiotic stress, which is the negative impact of non-living factors on the organisms such as temperature, sunlight, wind, salinity, flooding and drought. The types of biotic stresses imposed on an organism depend the climate where it lives as well as the species' ability to resist particular stresses. Biotic stress remains a broadly defined term and those who study it face many challenges, such as the greater difficulty in controlling biotic stresses in an experimental context compared to abiotic stress.

The damage caused by these various living and nonliving agents can appear very similar. Even with close observation, accurate diagnosis can be difficult. For example, browning of leaves on an oak tree caused by drought stress may appear similar to leaf browning caused by oak wilt, a serious vascular disease caused by a fungus, or the browning caused by anthracnose, a fairly minor leaf disease...

== Agriculture ==
Biotic stressors are a major focus of agricultural research, due to the vast economic losses caused to cash crops. The relationship between biotic stress and plant yield affects economic decisions as well as practical development. The impact of biotic injury on crop yield impacts population dynamics, plant-stressor coevolution, and ecosystem nutrient cycling.

Biotic stress also impacts horticultural plant health and natural habitats ecology. It also has dramatic changes in the host recipient. Plants are exposed to many stress factors, such as drought, high salinity or pathogens, which reduce the yield of the cultivated plants or affect the quality of the harvested products. Although there are many kinds of biotic stress, the majority of plant diseases are caused by fungi. Arabidopsis thaliana is often used as a model plant to study the responses of plants to different sources of stress.

=== In history ===
Biotic stresses have had huge repercussions for humanity; an example of this is the potato blight, an oomycete which caused widespread famine in England, Ireland and Belgium in the 1840s. Another example is grape phylloxera coming from North America in the 19th century, which led to the Great French Wine Blight.

=== Today ===
Losses to pests and disease in crop plants continue to pose a significant threat to agriculture and food security. During the latter half of the 20th century, agriculture became increasingly reliant on synthetic chemical pesticides to provide control of pests and diseases, especially within the intensive farming systems common in the developed world. However, in the 21st century, this reliance on chemical control is becoming unsustainable. Pesticides tend to have a limited lifespan due to the emergence of resistance in the target pests, and are increasingly recognised in many cases to have negative impacts on biodiversity, and on the health of agricultural workers and even consumers.

=== Tomorrow ===
Due to the implications of climate change, it is suspected that plants will have increased susceptibility to pathogens. Additionally, elevated threat of abiotic stresses (i.e. drought and heat) are likely to contribute to plant pathogen susceptibility.

== Effect on plant growth ==
=== Photosynthesis ===
Many biotic stresses affect photosynthesis, as chewing insects reduce leaf area and virus infections reduce the rate of photosynthesis per leaf area. Vascular-wilt fungi compromise the water transport and photosynthesis by inducing stomatal closure.

== Response to stress ==
Plants have co-evolved with their parasites for several hundred million years. This co-evolutionary process has resulted in the selection of a wide range of plant defences against microbial pathogens and herbivorous pests which act to minimise frequency and impact of attack. These defences include both physical and chemical adaptations, which may either be expressed constitutively, or in many cases, are activated only in response to attack. For example, utilization of high metal ion concentrations derived from the soil allow plants to reduce the harmful effects of biotic stressors (pathogens, herbivores etc.); meanwhile preventing the infliction of severe metal toxicity by way of safeguarding metal ion distribution throughout the plant with protective physiological pathways. Such induced resistance provides a mechanism whereby the costs of defence are avoided until defense is beneficial to the plant. At the same time, successful pests and pathogens have evolved mechanisms to overcome both constitutive and induced resistance in their particular host species. In order to fully understand and manipulate plant biotic stress resistance, we require a detailed knowledge of these interactions at a wide range of scales, from the molecular to the community level.

=== Inducible defense responses to insect herbivores ===
In order for a plant to defend itself against biotic stress, it must be able to differentiate between an abiotic and biotic stress. A plants response to herbivores starts with the recognition of certain chemicals that are abundant in the saliva of the herbivores. These compounds that trigger a response in plants are known as elicitors or herbivore-associated molecular patterns (HAMPs). These HAMPs trigger signalling pathways throughout the plant, initiating its defence mechanism and allowing the plant to minimise damage to other regions. These HAMPs trigger signalling pathways throughout the plant, initiating its defence mechanism and allowing the plant to minimise damage to other regions. Phloem feeders, like aphids, do not cause a great deal of mechanical damage to plants, but they are still regarded as pests and can seriously harm crop yields. Plants have developed a defence mechanism using salicylic acid pathway, which is also used in infection stress, when defending itself against phloem feeders. Plants perform a more direct attack on an insects digestive system. The plants do this using proteinase inhibitors. These proteinase inhibitors prevent protein digestion and once in the digestive system of an insect, they bind tightly and specifically to the active site of protein hydrolysing enzymes such as trypsin and chymotrypsin. This mechanism is most likely to have evolved in plants when dealing with insect attack.

Plants detect elicitors in the insects saliva. Once detected, a signal transduction network is activated. The presence of an elicitor causes an influx of Ca^{2+} ions to be released in to the cytosol. This increase in cytosolic concentration activates target proteins such as Calmodulin and other binding proteins. Downstream targets, such as phosphorylation and transcriptional activation of stimulus specific responses, are turned on by Ca^{2+} dependent protein kinases. In Arabidopsis, over expression of the IQD1 calmodulin-binding transcriptional regulator leads to inhibitor of herbivore activity. The role of calcium ions in this signal transduction network is therefore important.

Calcium Ions also play a large role in activating a plants defensive response. When fatty acid amides are present in insect saliva, the mitogen-activated protein kinases (MAPKs) are activated. These genes when activated, play a role in the jasmonic acid pathway. The jasmonic acid pathway is also referred to as the Octadecanoid pathway. This pathway is vital for the activation of defence genes in plants. The production of jasmonic acid, a phytohormone, is a result of the pathway. In an experiment using virus-induced gene silencing of two calcium-dependent protein kinases (CDPKs) in a wild tobacco (Nicotiana attenuata), it was discovered that the longer herbivory continued the higher the accumulation of jasmonic acid in wild-type plants and in silenced plants, the production of more defence metabolites was seen as well as the decrease in the growth rate of the herbivore used, the tobacco hornworm (Manduca sexta). This example demonstrates the importance of MAP kinases in plant defence regulation.

=== Inducible defense responses to pathogens ===
Plants are capable of detecting invaders through the recognition of non-self signals despite the lack of a circulatory or immune system like those found in animals. Often a plant's first line of defense against microbes occurs at the plant cell surface and involves the detection of microorganism-associated molecular patterns (MAMPs). MAMPs include nucleic acids common to viruses and endotoxins on bacterial cell membranes which can be detected by specialized pattern-recognition receptors. Another method of detection involves the use of plant immune receptors to detect effector molecules released into plant cells by pathogens. Detection of these signals in infected cells leads to an activation of effector-triggered immunity (ETI), a type of innate immune response.

Both the pattern recognition immunity (PTI) and effector-triggered immunity (ETI) result from the upregulation of multiple defense mechanisms including defensive chemical signaling compounds. An increase in the production of salicylic acid (SA) has been shown to be induced by pathogenic infection. The increase in SA results in the production of pathogenesis related (PR) genes which ultimately increase plant resistance to biotrophic and hemibiotrophic pathogens. Increases in jasmonic acid (JA) synthesis near the sites of pathogen infection have also been described. This physiological response to increase JA production has been implicated in the ubiquitination of jasmonate ZIM domains (JAZ) proteins, which inhibit JA signaling, leading to their degradation and a subsequent increase in JA activated defense genes.

Studies regarding the upregulation of defensive chemicals have confirmed the role of SA and JA in pathogen defense. In studies utilizing Arabidopsis mutants with the bacterial NahG gene, which inhibits the production and accumulation of SA, were shown to be more susceptible to pathogens than the wild-type plants. This was thought to result from the inability to produce critical defensive mechanisms including increased PR gene expression. Other studies conducted by injecting tobacco plants and Arabidopsis with salicylic acid resulted in higher resistance of infection by the alfalfa and tobacco mosaic viruses, indicating a role for SA biosynthesis in reducing viral replication. Additionally, studies performed using Arabidopsis with mutated jasmonic acid biosynthesis pathways have shown JA mutants to be at an increased risk of infection by soil pathogens.

Along with SA and JA, other defensive chemicals have been implicated in plant viral pathogen defenses including abscisic acid (ABA), gibberellic acid (GA), auxin, and peptide hormones. The use of hormones and innate immunity presents parallels between animal and plant defenses, though pattern-triggered immunity is thought to have arisen independently in each.

=== Cross tolerance with abiotic stress ===
- Evidence shows that a plant undergoing multiple stresses, both abiotic and biotic (usually pathogen or herbivore attack), can produce a positive effect on plant performance, by reducing their susceptibility to biotic stress compared to how they respond to individual stresses. The interaction leads to a crosstalk between their respective hormone signalling pathways which will either induce or antagonize another restructuring genes machinery to increase tolerance of defense reactions.
- Reactive oxygen species (ROS) are key signalling molecules produced in response to biotic and abiotic stress cross tolerance. ROS are produced in response to biotic stresses during the oxidative burst.
- Dual stress imposed by ozone (O3) and pathogen affects tolerance of crop and leads to altered host pathogen interaction (Fuhrer, 2003). Alteration in pathogenesis potential of pest due to O3 exposure is of ecological and economical importance.
- Tolerance to both biotic and abiotic stresses has been achieved. In maize, breeding programmes have led to plants which are tolerant to drought and have additional resistance to the parasitic weed Striga hermonthica.

== Remote sensing ==
The Agricultural Research Service (ARS) and various government agencies and private institutions have provided a great deal of fundamental information relating spectral reflectance and thermal emittance properties of soils and crops to their agronomic and biophysical characteristics. This knowledge has facilitated the development and use of various remote sensing methods for non-destructive monitoring of plant growth and development and for the detection of many environmental stresses that limit plant productivity. Coupled with rapid advances in computing and position locating technologies, remote sensing from ground-, air-, and space-based platforms is now capable of providing detailed spatial and temporal information on plant response to their local environment that is needed for site specific agricultural management approaches. This is very important in today's society because with increasing pressure on global food productivity due to population increase, result in a demand for stress-tolerant crop varieties that has never been greater.

== See also ==
- Abiotic stress – Stress on organisms caused by nonliving factors
- Biotic component – Community of living organisms together with the nonliving components of their environment
- List of beneficial weeds

== Sources ==
- Atkinson, N. J.; Urwin, P. E. (2012). "The interaction of plant biotic and abiotic stresses: from genes to the field". Journal of Experimental Botany. 63 (10): 3523–3543. doi:10.1093/jxb/ers100. PMID 22467407.
- Carris, L. M.; Little, C. R.; Stiles, C. M. (2012). "Introduction to Fungi". www.apsnet.org. doi:10.1094/PHI-I-2012-0426-01 (inactive 11 July 2025). Archived from the original on 2015-11-10.
- Flexas, J.; Loreto, F.; Medrano, H., eds. (2012). Terrestrial Photosynthesis In A Changing Environment: A Molecular, Physiological, and Ecological Approach. CUP. ISBN 978-0521899413.
- Flynn, P. (2003). "Biotic vs. Abiotic - Distinguishing Disease Problems from Environmental Stresses". ISU Entomology.
- Fuller, V. L.; Lilley, C. J.; Urwin, P. E. (2008). "Nematode resistance". New Phytologist. 180 (1): 27–44. Bibcode:2008NewPh.180...27F. doi:10.1111/j.1469-8137.2008.02508.x. PMID 18564304.
- Garrett, K. A.; Dendy, S. P.; Frank, E. E.; Rouse, M. N.; Travers, S. E. (2006). "Climate Change Effects on Plant Disease: Genomes to Ecosystems" (PDF). Annual Review of Phytopathology. 44 (1): 489–509. Bibcode:2006AnRvP..44..489G. doi:10.1146/annurev.phyto.44.070505.143420. hdl:2097/2379. PMID 16722808.
- Karim, S. (2007). Exploring plant tolerance to biotic and abiotic stresses (PDF) (Thesis). ISBN 978-9157673572.
- Perez, I. B.; Brown, P. J. (2014). "The role of ROS signaling in cross-tolerance: from model to crop". Front. Plant Sci. 5: 754. Bibcode:2014FrPS....5..754P. doi:10.3389/fpls.2014.00754. PMC 4274871. PMID 25566313.
- Peterson, R. K. D.; Higley, L. G., eds. (2001). Biotic Stress and Yield Loss. CRC Press. ISBN 978-0849311451.
- Pinter, P. J.; Hatfield, J. L.; Schepers, J. S.; Barnes, E. M.; Moran, M. S.; Daughtry, C. S.T.; Upchurch, D. R. (2003). "Remote Sensing for Crop Management". Photogrammetric Engineering & Remote Sensing. 69 (6): 647–664. Bibcode:2003PgERS..69..647P. doi:10.14358/PERS.69.6.647.
- Poschenrieder, C.; Tolrà, R.; Barceló, J. (2006). "Can metals defend plants against biotic stress?". Trends in Plant Science. 11 (6): 288–295. Bibcode:2006TPS....11..288P. doi:10.1016/j.tplants.2006.04.007. PMID 16697693.
- Raju, N. J.; Gossel, W.; Ramanathan, A.; Sudhakar, M., eds. (2015). Management of Water, Energy and Bio-resources in the Era of Climate Change: Emerging Issues and Challenges. doi:10.1007/978-3-319-05969-3. ISBN 978-3319059686. S2CID 132165592.
- Rejeb, I. B.; Pastor, V.; Mauch-Mani, B. (2014). "Plant Responses to Simultaneous Biotic and Abiotic Stress: Molecular Mechanisms". Plants. 3 (4): 458–475. Bibcode:2014Plnts...3..458B. doi:10.3390/plants3040458. PMC 4844285. PMID 27135514.
- Roberts, M. (2013). "Preface: Induced Resistance to biotic stress". Journal of Experimental Botany. 64 (5): 1235–1236. doi:10.1093/jxb/ert076. PMID 23616991.
- Yadav, B. K. V. (2012). "Abiotic stress". forestrynepal.org. Archived from the original on 7 August 2016.
