= Leucyl aminopeptidase =

Class of enzymes

Leucine aminopeptidase
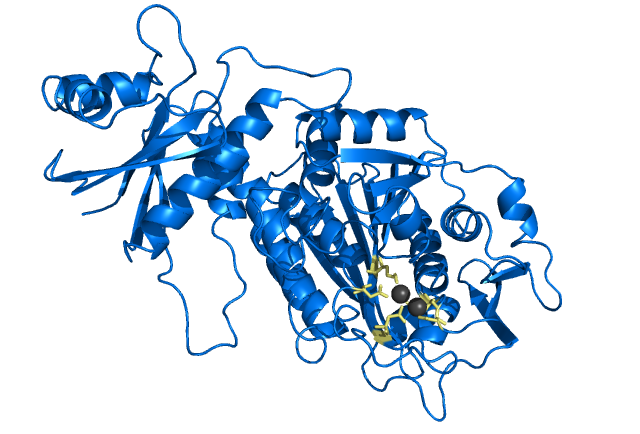
- Crystal structure of bovine leucyl aminopeptidase with co-ordinated zinc ions. Rendered from PDB 1BLL.

Identifiers
- Symbol: LAP
- Alt. symbols: PEPS
- NCBI gene: 51056
- HGNC: 18449
- OMIM: 170250
- RefSeq: NM_015907
- UniProt: P28838

Other data
- EC number: 3.4.11.1
- Locus: Chr. 4 p15.33
Search for
- Structures: Swiss-model
- Domains: InterPro

Leucyl aminopeptidases (EC 3.4.11.1, leucine aminopeptidase, LAPs, leucyl peptidase, peptidase S, cytosol aminopeptidase, cathepsin III, L-leucine aminopeptidase, leucinaminopeptidase, leucinamide aminopeptidase, FTBL proteins, proteinates FTBL, aminopeptidase II, aminopeptidase III, aminopeptidase I) are enzymes that preferentially catalyze the hydrolysis of leucine residues at the N-terminus of peptides and proteins. Other N-terminal residues can also be cleaved, however. LAPs have been found across superkingdoms. Identified LAPs include human LAP, bovine lens LAP, porcine LAP, Escherichia coli (E. coli) LAP (also known as PepA or XerB), and the solanaceous-specific acidic LAP (LAP-A) in tomato (Solanum lycopersicum).

== Enzyme description, structure, and active site ==
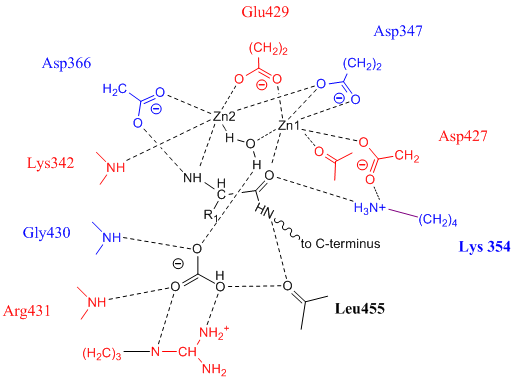
LAP-A active site residues. Two Zn+2 cations are also shown, along with a water and a bicarbonate ion that acts as a general base.

The active sites in PepA and in bovine lens LAP have been found to be similar. Shown in the picture below is the proposed model for the active site of LAP-A in tomato based on the work of Strater et al. It is also known that the biochemistry of the LAPs from these three kingdoms is very similar. PepA, bovine lens LAP, and LAP-A preferentially cleave N-terminal leucine, arginine, and methionine residues. These enzymes are all metallopeptidases requiring divalent metal cations for their enzymatic activity Enzymes are active in the presence of Mn^{+2}, Mg^{+2} and Zn^{+2}. These enzymes are also known to have high pH (pH 8) and temperature optima. At pH 8, the highest enzymatic activity is seen at 60 °C. PepA, bovine lens LAP and LAP-A are also known to form hexamers in vivo. The Gu et al. from 1999 demonstrated that six 55kDA enzymatically inactive LAP-A protomers come together to form the 353kDa bioactive LAP-A hexamer. Structures of the bovine lens LAP protomer and the biologically active hexamer have been constructed can be found through Protein Data Bank (2J9A).

== Mechanism(s) ==
Historically, the mechanisms of carboxypeptidases and endoprotease have been much more well-studied and understood by researchers (Ref #6 Lipscomb 1990). Work within the past two decades has provided vital knowledge regarding the mechanisms of aminopeptidases. The mechanism of

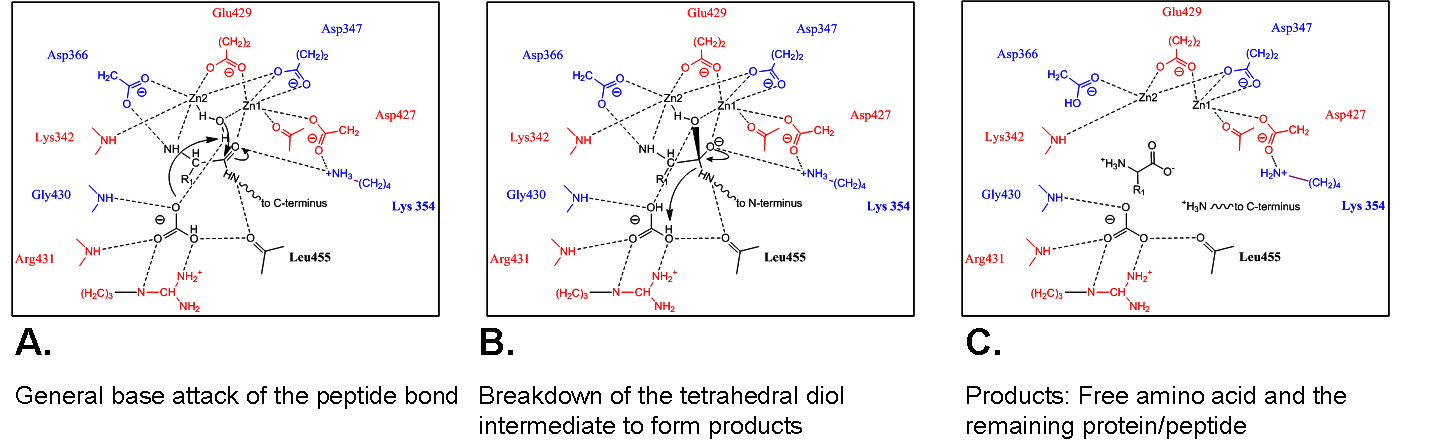
In this mechanism, the bicarbonate ion acts as a general base. For LAP-A, R1 could be the R group of leucine, methionine, or arginine.

bovine lens LAP and PepA have been elucidated (Ref 1 and 2), however, the exact mechanism of tomato LAP-A is unknown at this time. A search of current literature does not indicate that new research is underway to determine the exact mechanism of LAP-A. Based on the biochemical similarities of the LAPs between kingdoms, the mechanism of LAP-A may be similar to bovine lens LAP and PepA.

== Biological function ==
Once thought of as a housekeeping gene necessary only for protein turnover, studies have demonstrated that LAP-A has a regulatory role in the immune response in tomato.

=== Background on plant immune response ===
In order to survive, plants must be able to respond to many biotic and abiotic stresses, including pathogen attack, piercing/sucking insects, herbivory, and mechanical wounding. These stresses activate specialized signal transduction pathways, which are specific to the stressor and the amount of tissue damage inflicted. Similar to mechanical wounding, chewing insects, such as the tobacco hornworm (Manduca sexta, one of the major pests of tomato), cause extensive tissue damage activating the jasmonic acid (JA)-mediated response (Walling 2000). This JA-mediated response revolves around the octadecanoid pathway, which is responsible for the synthesis of JA and several other potent signaling molecules, and ends in the regulation of two sets of genes whose expression changes over time. The early genes amplify the wounding signal and can be detected 30 minutes to 2 hours after damage (Ryan 2000). Late gene expression can be seen 4–24 hours after wounding. Products of late-response genes act as deterrents to chewing-insect feeding, often by decreasing the nutritional value of the food ingested or interfering with insect gut function (Walling 2000). For example, serine proteinase inhibitors (Pins) interfere with digestive proteases in the insect gut and polyphenol oxidases (PPO) act to decrease the nutritive value of plant leaves after ingestion by herbivores (Johnson et al. 1989; Ryan 2000; Orozco-Cardenas 2001). Please see the Picture 3 for a summary of the wound response in tomato.

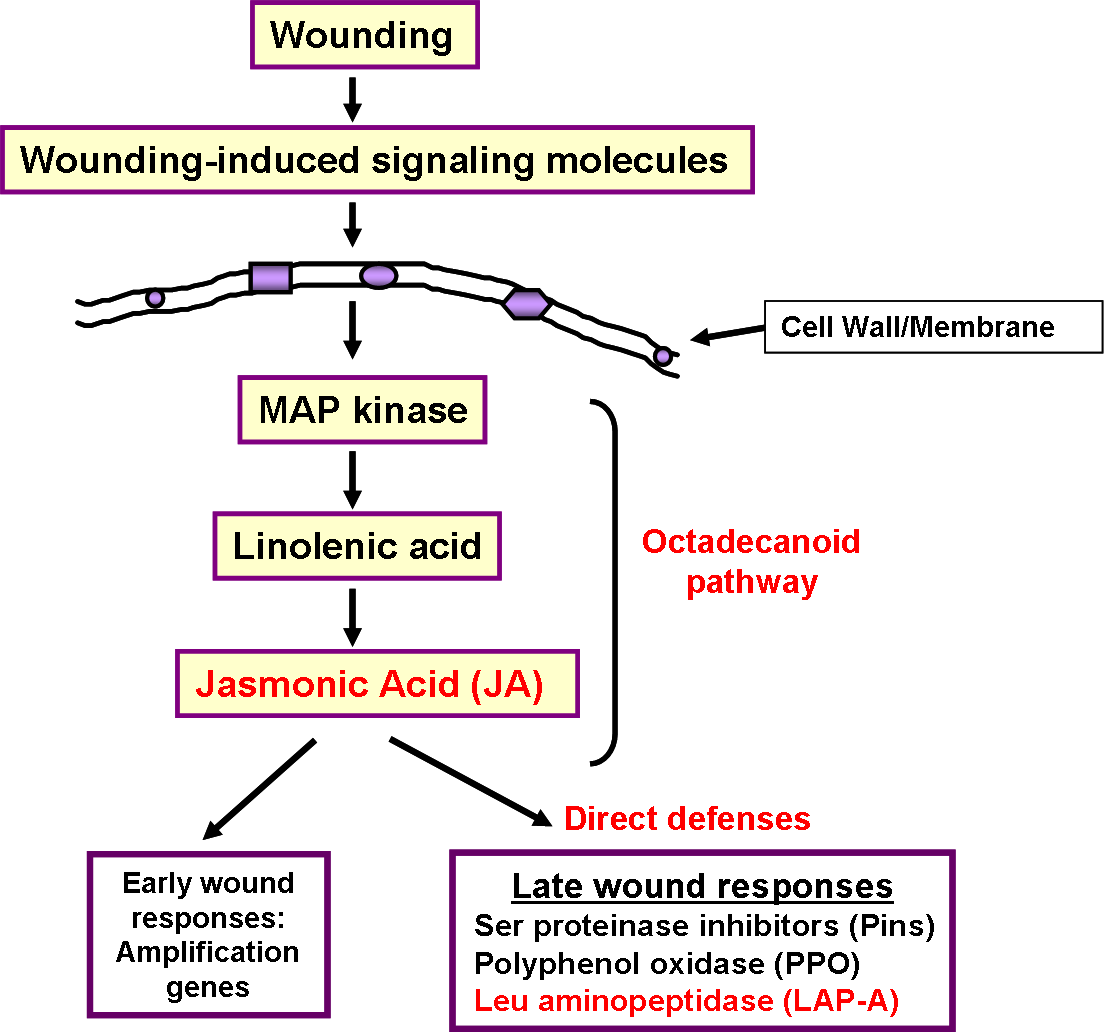
The wounding response pathway as studied in tomato.

The plant response in this octadecanoid pathway is similar to mammalian prostaglandin and leukotriene pathways (Ref Walling 2000). This particular pathway is inhibited by salicylic acid.

=== Octadecanoid pathway ===
(LAP-A), a product of the octadecanoid pathway in some solanaceous plants, has been shown by Fowler et al. to have a regulatory role in the late wound response of tomato. Experiments were conducted using three genotypes of tomato plants: wildtype (WT), (LapA-SI) plants that were silenced for LAP-A, and LapA-OX that constitutively expressed LAP-A. Late-gene expression was inhibited in wounded LapA-SI plants, and the LapA-SI plants were also more susceptible to tobacco hornworm feeding, relative to wildtype (WT) plants. In comparison, the wounded LapA-OX leaves exhibited heightened levels of late gene RNA accumulation, an increased resistance to herbivory, and extended expression of late wound-response genes. These data suggest that LAP-A functions in regulating both the intensity and the persistence of the late wound response. However, unwounded LapA-OX did not accumulate late gene RNA transcripts, suggesting that presence of LAP-A alone is not sufficient to induce late gene expression. LAP-A is the first plant aminopeptidase shown to have a regulatory role in signal transduction pathway.

=== Osmoregulation ===
LAP proteins are expressed in a variety of marine organisms as a method of coping with the osmotic threat high salinity poses to the cell. During bouts of high salinity, LAP begins the catalysis of proteins in order to release amino acids into the cell in an attempt to balance the high ion concentrations in the external environment.
