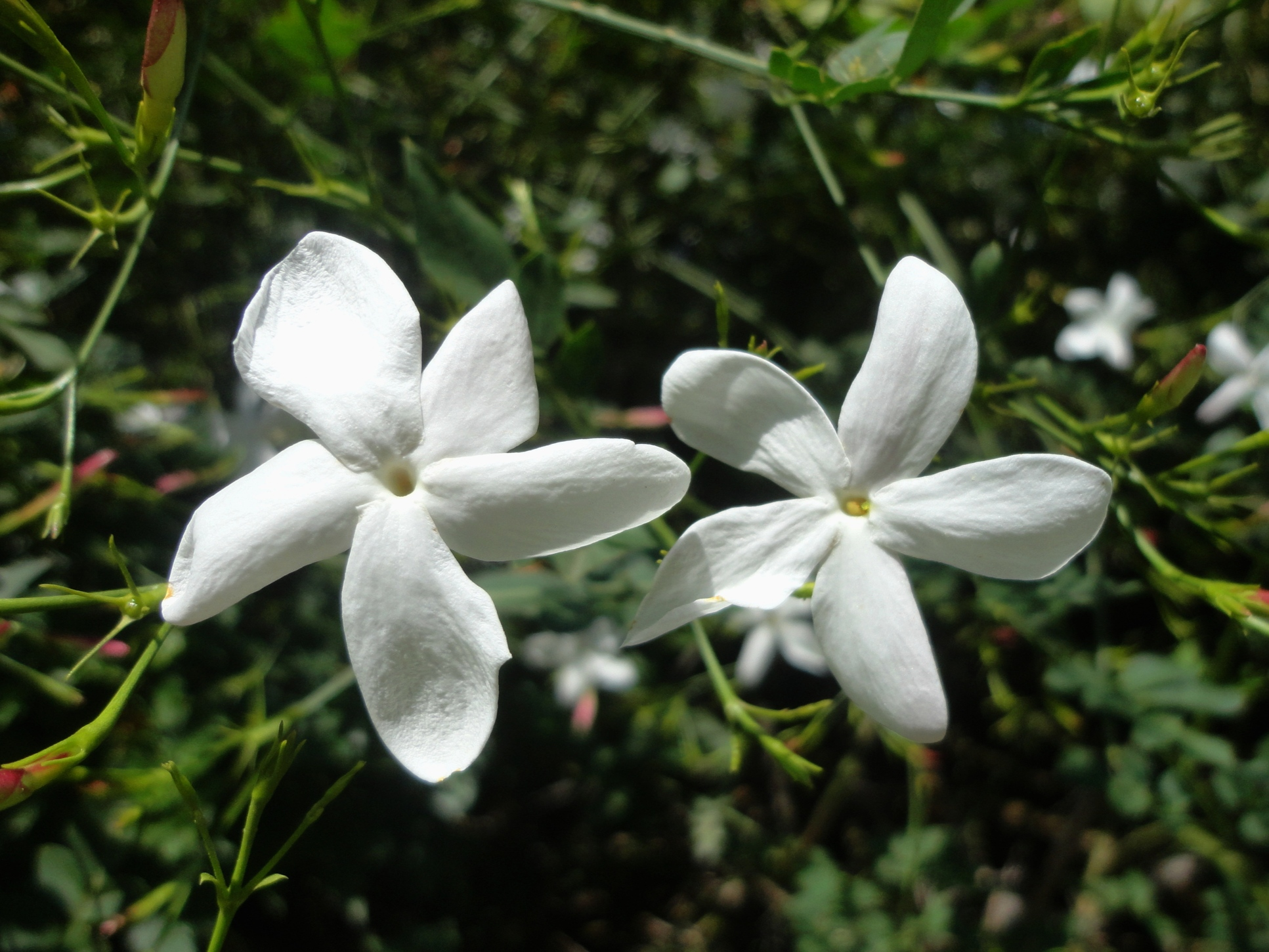

Scientific classification
- Kingdom: Plantae
- Clade: Tracheophytes
- Clade: Angiosperms
- Clade: Eudicots
- Clade: Asterids
- Order: Lamiales
- Family: Oleaceae
- Genus: Jasminum
- Species: J. grandiflorum

Binomial name
- Jasminum grandiflorum L.

= Jasminum grandiflorum =

Species of plant

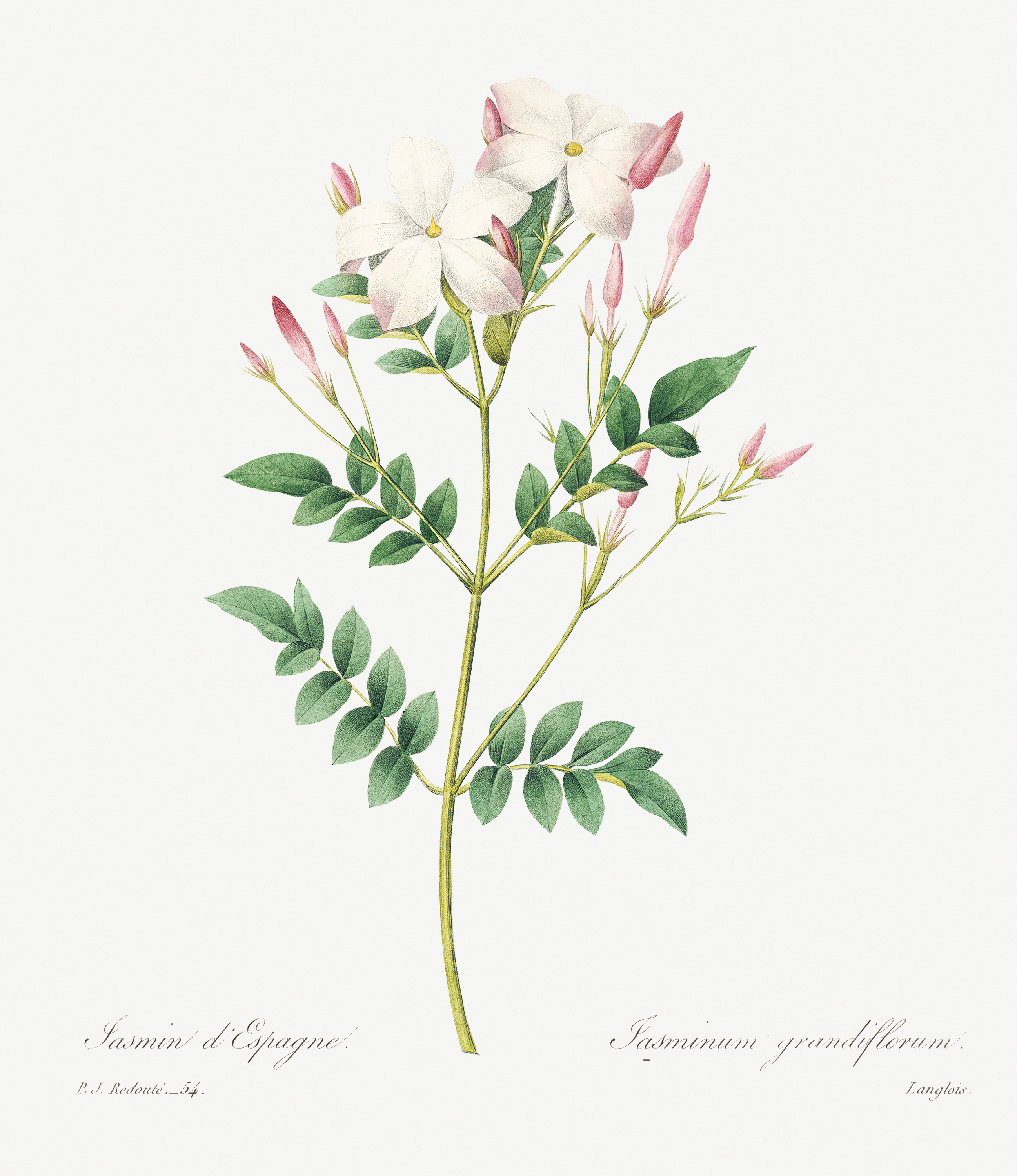
Botanical illustration of Spanish jasmine by Pierre-Joseph Redouté

Jasminum grandiflorum, also known variously as the Spanish jasmine, Royal jasmine, Catalan jasmine, Sicilian jasmine, is a species of jasmine native to South Asia, the Arabian peninsula, East and Northeast Africa and the Yunnan and Sichuan regions of China. The species is widely cultivated and is reportedly naturalized in Guinea, the Maldive Islands, Mauritius, Réunion, Java, the Cook Islands, Chiapas, Central America, and the Caribbean. It is closely related to, and sometimes treated as merely a form of, Jasminum officinale.

== Description ==
It is a scrambling deciduous shrub growing to 2–4 m (6 ft 7 in – 13 ft 1 in) tall. The leaves are opposite, 5–12 cm (2.0–4.7 in) long, pinnate with 5–11 leaflets. The flowers are produced in open cymes, the individual flowers are white having corolla with a basal tube 13–25 mm (0.51–0.98 in) long and five lobes 13–22 mm (0.51–0.87 in) long. In Pakistan, it grows wild in the Salt Range and Rawalpindi District at 500–1,500 m (1,640–4,920 ft) altitude.

=== Etymology ===
'Jasminum' is a Latinized form of the Persian word 'yasmin' for sweetly scented plants. 'Grandiflorum' is a Latin term meaning large, showy flowers.

== Morphology ==
J. grandiflorum grow in shrubs that are semi-spreading. These plants have green, woody, pubescent stems that are either angular or grooved shape. The green colored leaves are ovate-acute or acuminate shaped and are either pinnatipartite or pinnately compound. The surface of the leaves are glabrous, have no hairs, with a wavy leaf margin and contain no stipules. These leaves are about 0.35 mm thick that are arranged in whorls of three and also include short petioles. The sepals of the flowers are green with white, glabrous flowers in a linear arrangement. There are two stamens, each with a yellow colored anther, in the center of the corolla tube per flower. These flowers contain no fruit.

== Subspecies ==
Two subspecies are recognized:

- Jasminum grandiflorum subsp. floribundum (R.Br. ex Fresen.) P.S.Green (syn., Jasminum floribundum R. Br. ex Fresen.) - African and Arabian portions of natural range
- Jasminum grandiflorum subsp. grandiflorum - South Asian plants as well as cultivars and naturalized populations

== Uses ==
=== Medicine ===
Ancient Indian physicians such as Charaka and Sushruta used Jasminum grandiflorum for various medicinal purposes. This flower is also given a variety of names in India as it is used for different remedies. Parts of J. grandiflorum, including their sprouts and flowers (dried), have been used for prescriptions. This type of holistic medicine was used to treat various sicknesses such as dermatosis, coryza, and nasal haemorrhage. The leaves of J. grandiflorum is utilized as an ingredient for clarified butter, a treatment for infected wounds and cleaning and sterilizing ulcers. In addition, the leaves can be made into an oil as a remedy for infection. The leaves may also be chewed on to aid in toothaches and stomatitis. The root of the plant would be cooked with goat's milk and sugar to relieve pain in urine retention and kidney stone release. The root was also made into a paste to improve the skin and removing freckles or dark shades. The root paste would be applied to the foreheads as well for any headaches. This plant is used as another ingredient for hair oil to treat baldness and alopecia. It can also be used as a component for an eye-salve to help vision loss. In India, Jasminum grandiflorum, was additionally prescribed for severe skin diseases and leprosy. In the West, the flowers have also been made into a syrup as a medicine for throat issues such as coughs and hoarseness.

=== Fragrance ===
Jasmine has been made into a well-known scent around the world. It was introduced as a perfume in Europe in the 16th century. The flowers create an aroma that exudes a calm atmosphere, relieving mental and emotional strains. Due to the pleasing scent, J. grandiflorum are commonly made into essential oils, perfumes, soaps, and cosmetics worldwide.

=== Chemical Composition ===
J. grandiflorum is composed of benzyl acetate (23.7%), benzyl benzoate (20.7%), phytol (10.9%), linalool (8.2%), isophytol (5.5%), geranyl linalool (3.0%), methyl linoleate (2.8%) and eugenol (2.5%). These components contribute to creating the popular jasmine fragrance. Methyl jasmonate isolated from the jasmine oil of Jasinum grandiflorum led to the discovery of the molecular structure of the jasmonate plant hormones.

== Conservation ==
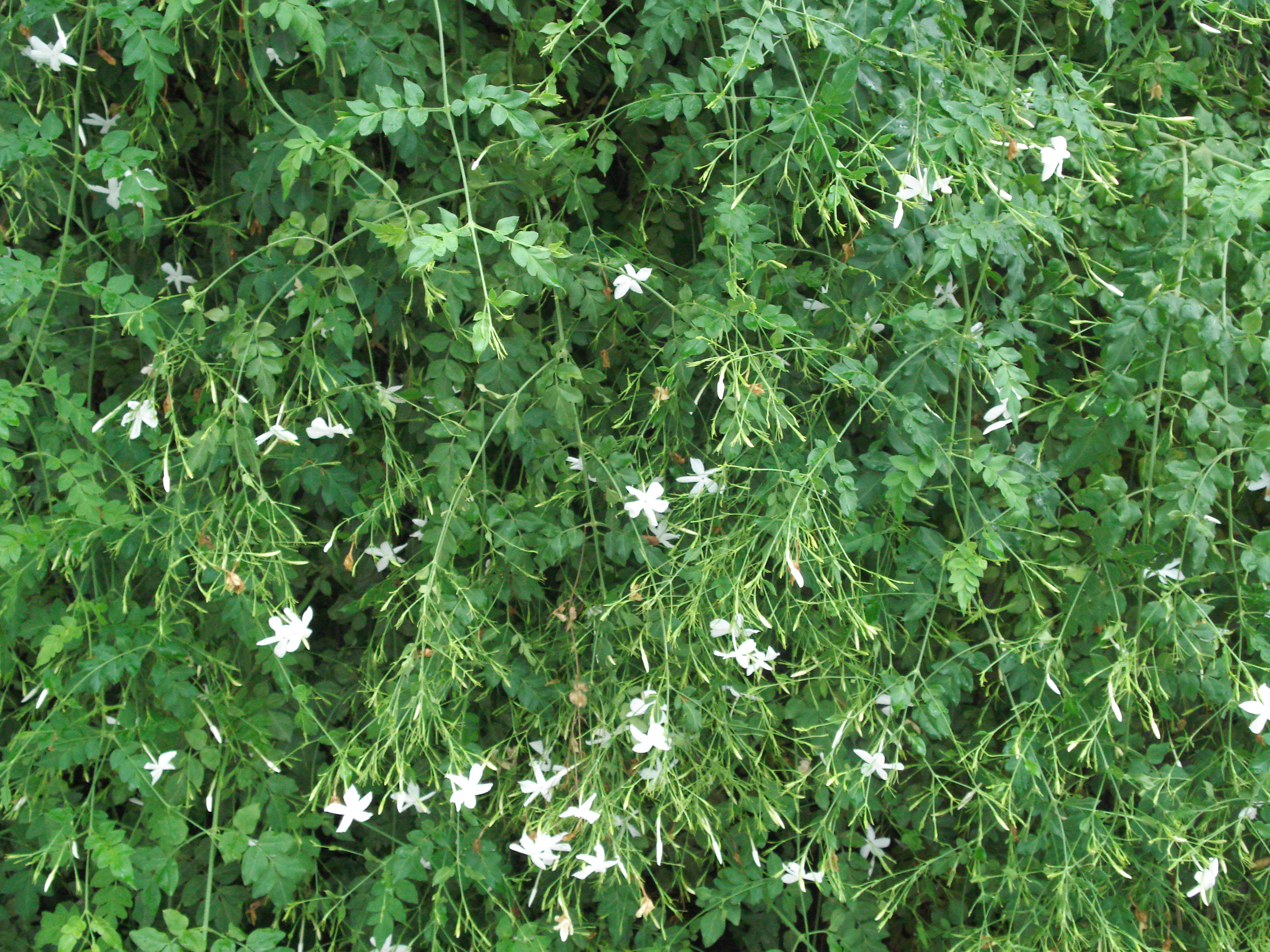
Jasminum grandiflorum

Because of the valued medicinal properties of this plant, there have been efforts to conserve it. Pharmaceutical companies rely on the export of Jasminum grandiflorum from countries such as India and Bangladesh. Commercial cultivation is rarely seen of the plant. In vitro micropropagation is a method that has been used to conserve the plant by rapidly producing clones of the original parent species under a short time period and in sterile conditions.
