= Diaminohexanoic acid =

Diaminohexanoic acid may refer to:

- 2,6-Diaminohexanoic acid (lysine)
- 3,6-Diaminohexanoic acid (beta-lysine)
