= 12-oxophytodienoate reductase =

Class of enzymes

Identifiers
- EC no.: 1.3.1.42
- CAS no.: 101150-03-2

Databases
- IntEnz: IntEnz view
- BRENDA: BRENDA entry
- ExPASy: NiceZyme view
- KEGG: KEGG entry
- MetaCyc: metabolic pathway
- PRIAM: profile
- PDB structures: RCSB PDB PDBe PDBsum
- Gene Ontology: AmiGO / QuickGO
Search
- PMC: articles
- PubMed: articles
- NCBI: proteins

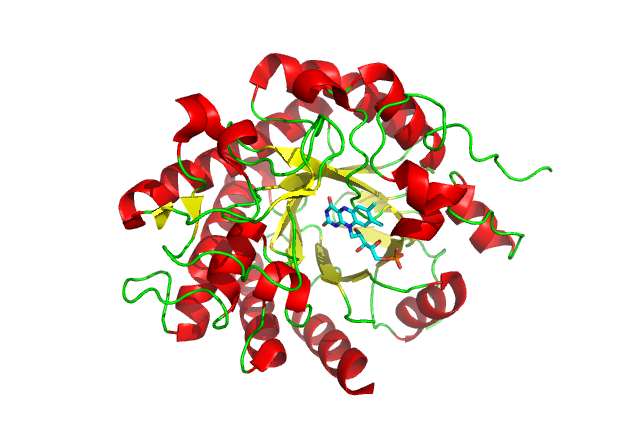
Structure of 12-oxophytodienoate reductase (OPR3) bound to FMN cofactor, created in Pymol.

12-oxophytodienoate reductase (OPRs) is an enzyme of the family of Old Yellow Enzymes (OYE). OPRs are grouped into two groups: OPRI and OPRII – the second group is the focus of this article, as the function of the first group is unknown, but is the subject of current research. The OPR enzyme utilizes the cofactor flavin mononucleotide (FMN) and catalyzes the following reaction in the jasmonic acid synthesis pathway:

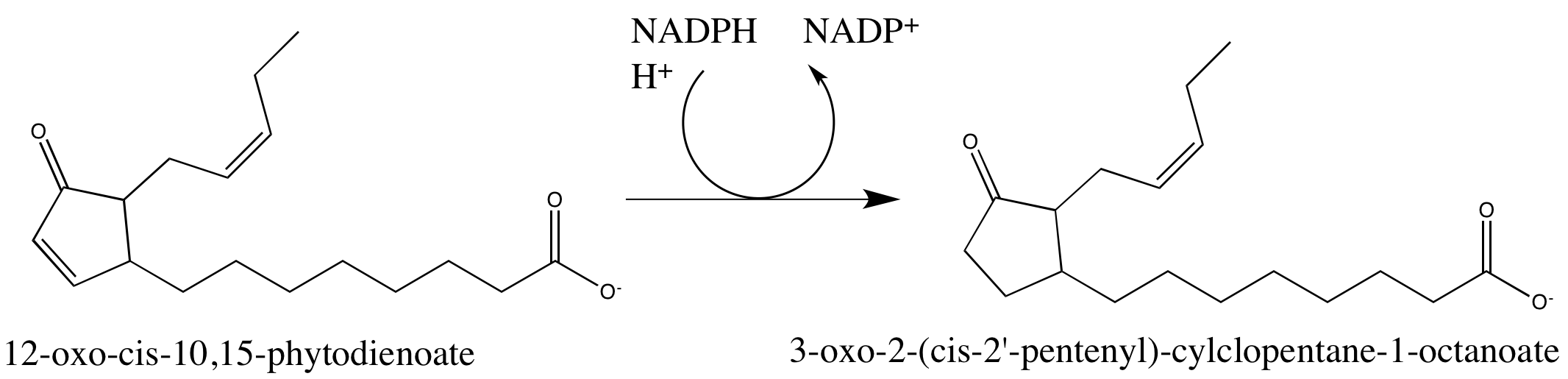
Reaction catalyzed by 12-oxophytodienoate reductase in the jasmonic acid synthesis pathway.

This reaction occurs in peroxisomes in plants. Several isozymes have been discovered, with varying substrate stereospecificity: three in Solanum lycopersicum, 13 in Oryza sativa, and five in Arabidopsis thaliana. The OPR3 isozyme is most extensively studied because it can reduce all 4 stereoisomers of the substrate, OPDA and because it has shown to be the most significant enzyme in the jasmonic acid synthesis pathway.

== Structure ==
12-oxophytodienoate reductase structure resembles OYE enzymes and has been elucidated by x-ray crystal structures. The cDNA encodes 372 amino acids for this enzyme. It exhibits a barrel fold of eight parallel beta-strands surrounded by eight alpha-helices to create a barrel shape. Turns at the N-terminus loops of the beta-strands have been shown to contain three to four amino acid residues and the C-terminus loops range between three and 47 amino acid residues. The C-terminus loops largely make up the active site and the larger range of the amount of residues is due to the diversity in the different isozyme active sites.

OPR3, the most extensively studied isoform of 12-oxophytodienoate reductase, has a wider binding pocket than OPR1, which is enantioselective for only one OPDA substrate enantiomer. The residues Tyr78 and Tyr246 that are at the mouth of the active site are responsible for the higher enantioselectivity of OPR1. OPR1 and OPR3 have identical substrate binding residues, but the difference in the width of the mouth of the active site determines the OPR1 specificity.

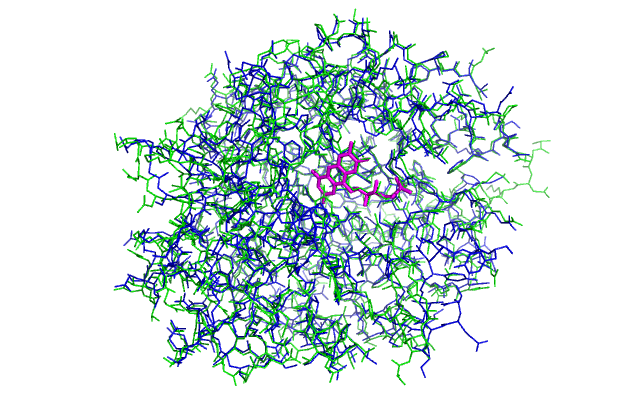
12-oxophytodienoate reductase isomers OPR3 (blue) and OPR1 (green) with FMN cofactor (pink).

12-oxophytodienoate reductase has also been shown to practice self-inhibition by dimerization. This is the only flavoprotein known to dimerize for inhibition and this dimerization is thought to be regulated by phosphorylation. The dimerization occurs by the mutual binding of two loops into the two active sites. These loops are highly evolutionarily conserved, indicating the dimerization is purposeful and significant in regulation.

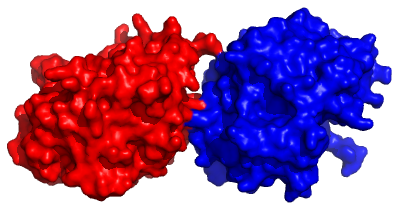
12-oxophytodienoate reductase (OPR3) dimerized to itself. This dimer provides self-inhibition of the enzyme.

== Mechanism ==
The reduction mechanism employed has been shown to be a ping-pong, bi-bi mechanism. The FMN cofactor is first reduced by NADPH, the substrate is then bound, and finally the substrate is reduced by a hydride transfer from NADPH to the substrate’s beta carbon. The Km of OPR3 in Zea mays was found to be 190 micromolar for its substrate OPDA.

== Biological Function ==
The reaction catalyzed by 12-oxophytodienoate reductase is in the jasmonic acid biosynthesis pathway. Jasmonic acid is known for its importance as a gene regulator for development and defense.

OPR3 is shown to be induced by touch, wind, UV light, application of detergent, wounding, and brassinosteroids. In wound response, its activity has been shown to partially depend on jasmonic acid perception. It is also shown to have greater enzyme efficiency than OPR1 and OPR2 in Arabidopsis thaliana, showing it is the significant enzyme in the jasmonic acid biosynthesis pathway.

== Relevance to Agriculture ==
This enzyme is of interest in plant biology research because the disrupted OPR3 gene has been shown to cause male sterility in Arabidopsis thaliana. This is a point of interest in understanding the factors surrounding viable pollen development, a focus of research in the agriculture industry.

== Relevance to Phytoremediation ==
OPR has shown to also function in the reduction of explosive 2,4,6-trinitrotoluene (TNT). Because TNT is a known toxic, environmental pollutant that is difficult to degrade, the use of phytoremediation to clean up sites contaminated with TNT is of significant interest. OPR1 degraded TNT faster and with greater amount of degraded products than other isozymes. This enzyme could therefore be used in phytoremediation.

== Phylogenetics ==
A phylogenetic analysis studying the structural evolution and functional divergence of the various OPR paralogues found seven conserved sub-families and suggested expansion of the OPR families occurred in land plants. A total of 74 OPR genes in 11 species from six major plant lineages were found. Surprisingly, introns were found to differ in length and number, but conserved in position, indicating successive intron loss. The study also indicated that the substrate binding loop and the alpha-helices, but not the beta-sheets, were critical for functional divergence after sub-families were established and are therefore important in the OPR proteins.
