= Inflammatory reflex =

Neural circuit on immune system

The inflammatory reflex is a neural circuit that regulates the immune response to injury and invasion. All reflexes have an afferent and efferent arc. The Inflammatory reflex has a sensory afferent arc, which is activated by cytokines and a motor or efferent arc, which transmits action potentials in the vagus nerve to suppress cytokine production. Increased signaling in the efferent arc inhibits inflammation and prevents organ damage.

It has also been shown that the brain can use this circuit to regulate the immune response and to extend the immunological memory.

== Molecular mechanism ==
The molecular basis of cytokine-inhibiting signals requires the neurotransmitter acetylcholine, and the Alpha-7 nicotinic receptor receptor expressed on cytokine-producing cells. The release of acetylcholine in the spleen suppresses the production of TNF and other cytokines which causes damaging inflammation. Signaling in the efferent arc of the inflammatory reflex, termed the "Cholinergic anti-inflammatory pathway," provides a regulatory check on the innate immune system response to invasion and injury. The action potentials that arise in the vagus nerve are transmitted to the spleen, where a subset of specialized T cells are activated to secrete acetylcholine. The net effect of the reflex is to prevent the damage caused by excessive cytokine production.

== Therapeutic potential ==
Evidence from experimental disease models of arthritis, colitis, sepsis, hemorrhagic shock, and congestive heart failure indicate that electrical stimulation of the vagus nerve can prevent or reverse these diseases. Some research suggests that it is possible to implant nerve stimulants to replace anti-inflammatory drugs that target cytokine activity (e.g. anti-TNF and anti-IL-1 antibodies).

According to Dawn Steiner, a patient in SetPoint Medical's RESET-RA clinical trial, she experienced significant relief from her rheumatoid arthritis symptoms thanks to a vitamin-sized device surgically implanted in her neck to stimulate her vagus nerve, which uses the inflammatory reflex to stop inflammation.

== See also ==
- Interoception
- Pavlovian conditioning
