= Allene oxide =

In organic chemistry, an allene oxide is an epoxide of an allene. The parent compound 2-methylideneoxirane, also known as allene oxide, is CH_{2}=C(−O−)CH_{2}, a rare and reactive species of only theoretical interest.

Certain derivatives can be prepared by epoxidation of the allenes with peracetic acid. Typical allene oxides require steric protection for their isolation. They readily rearrange to cyclopropanones via an oxyallyl intermediate.

Despite the esoteric character of synthetic allene oxides, allene oxides occur naturally. They are intermediates in the chemical defense of some plants against attack by herbivores. Specifically, a hydroperoxide of linolenic acid is the substrate for the enzyme allene oxide synthase. The resulting allene oxide in turn is converted by allene oxide cyclase to jasmonic acid.

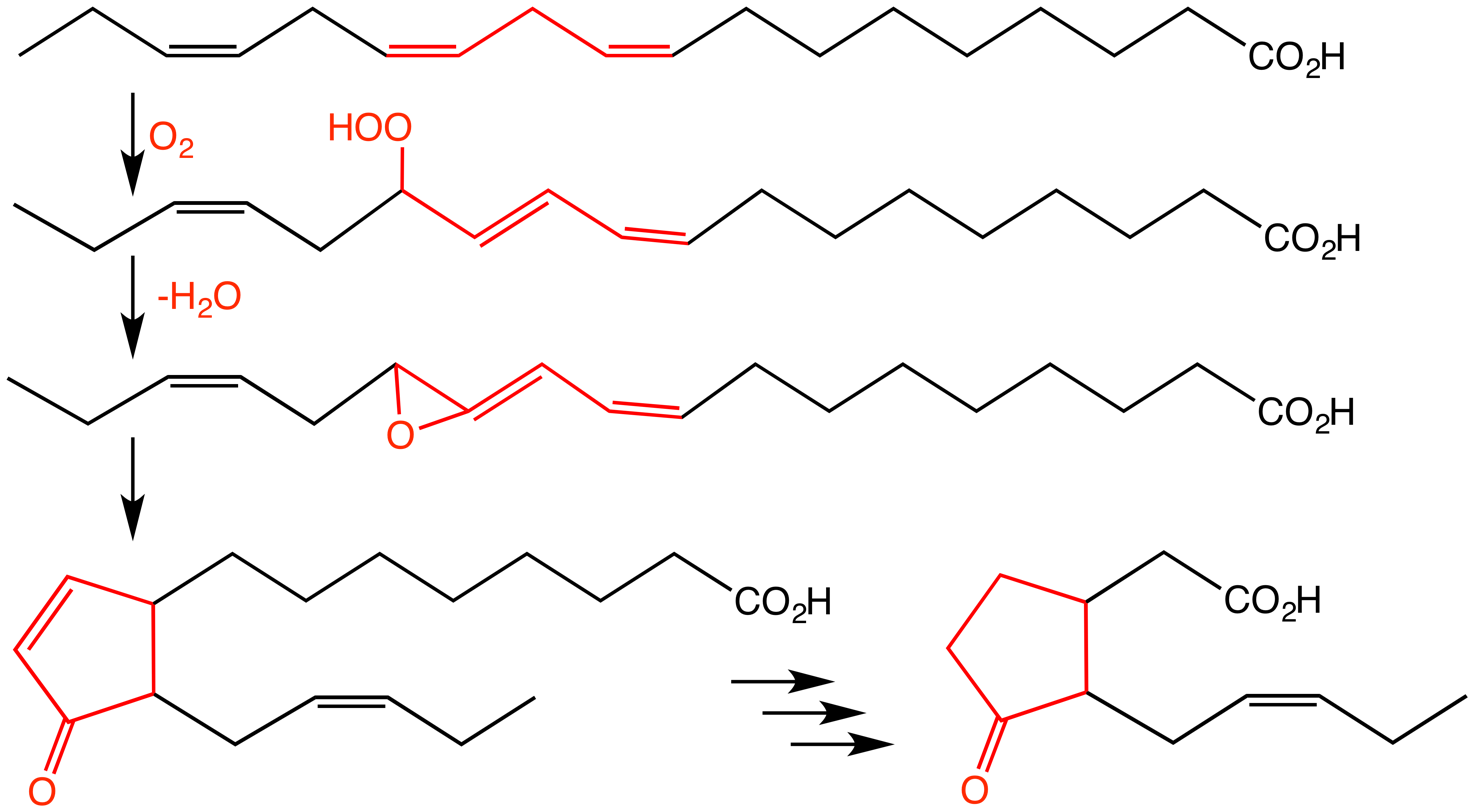
Pathway for biosynthesis of jasmonic acid via allene oxide intermediate. Highlighted is the pentadiene core that is the site of the reactions.

Nevertheless, allene oxides are extremely unstable even in biological contexts, decomposing with a half-life of approximately 15–30 s.
