= Elicitor =

Molecules involved in pattern triggered plant immunity

In plant biology, elicitors are extrinsic or foreign molecules often associated with plant pests, diseases or synergistic organisms. Elicitor molecules can attach to special receptor proteins located on plant cell membranes. These receptors are able to recognize the molecular pattern of elicitors and trigger intracellular defence signalling via the octadecanoid pathway. This response results in the enhanced synthesis of metabolites which reduce damage and increase resistance to pest, disease or environmental stress. This is an immune response called pattern triggered immunity (PTI).

PTI is effective against necrotrophic microorganisms.

An example is chitosan which is found in insects, fungi and the shells of crustaceans. Chitosan is used in agriculture as a natural biocontrol agent, to improve plant health and increase crop yields.

== Effectors and hormones ==
Effectors and hormones are other signalling molecules often confused with elicitors. Elicitors and effectors differ from hormones in that they are not produced within the organism that they are triggering a response in, and are usually not naturally occurring in the organism.

=== Plant hormones ===
Plant hormones are signalling molecules produced within the plant (i.e. they are endogenous). Hormones regulate cellular processes in targeted cells locally and can be moved to other parts of the plant. Examples of plant hormones are auxins, cytokins, gibberellin, ethylene, abscisic acid, salicylic acid and jasmonates. Hormones naturally occur in extremely low, finely balanced, concentrations.

Plant hormones act as plant growth regulators or modulators. Modulators are defined as molecules that "bind to a particular target protein, mainly to an enzyme, thereby directly changing its activity, i.e. increasing or decreasing". An example is salicylic acid which is a modulator of catalase isozymes activity and jasmonate, which modulates phenylalanine ammonia lyase activity.

=== Effectors ===
Effectors are proteins secreted by microbial pathogens which can either trigger or compromise immunity depending on the ability of perception (presence of suitable receptor) and response (appropriate defence reaction) of the plant. Effector could be extracellular or injected directly into cells.

Microorganisms are able to inject effectors directly into host cells to by-pass induced defences in plants. This compromises the host plant's defence system and is referred to as effector-triggered susceptibility (ETS). The remaining immunity is called basal defense which can limit the spread of virulent pathogens in their hosts but it is typically insufficient to prevent disease.

In response to this threat, plant's have evolved effector recognition protein receptors to recognise, or monitor, effectors and initiate effector-triggered immunity (ETI). ETI is a strong immune response that efficiently protects plants from avirulent biotrophic pathogens and is often associated with the hypersensitive reaction (HR), a form of programmed death of plant cells at infection sites.

== Crop protection and commercialisation of elicitors ==
Elicitors can protect crops from diseases, stress and damage. Elicitors do not need to be directly toxic for pathogenic organisms or pests to be of benefit. Therefore, they are an alternative to conventional pesticides which are often harmful for the environment, farmers and consumers and for which consumers are increasingly seeking safer alternatives.
