= Jasmonate =

Lipid-based plant hormones

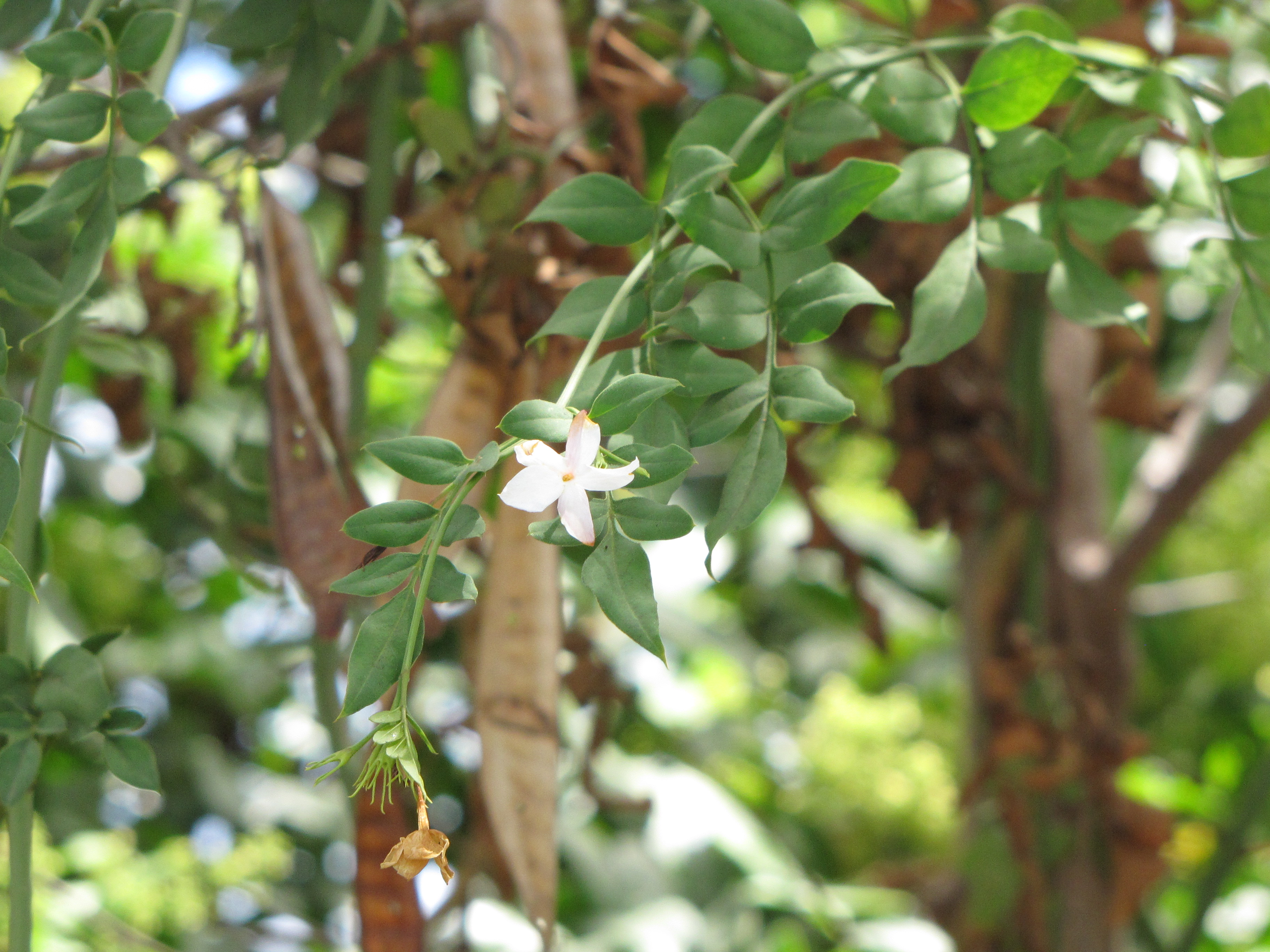
Jasminum grandiflorum

Jasmonate (JA) and its derivatives are lipid-based plant hormones that regulate a wide range of processes in plants, ranging from growth and photosynthesis to reproductive development. In particular, JAs are critical for plant defense against herbivory and plant responses to poor environmental conditions and other kinds of abiotic and biotic challenges. Some JAs can also be released as volatile organic compounds (VOCs) to permit communication between plants in anticipation of mutual dangers.

== History ==
The isolation of methyl jasmonate (MeJA) from jasmine oil derived from Jasminum grandiflorum led to the discovery of the molecular structure of jasmonates and their name in 1962 while jasmonic acid itself was isolated from Lasiodiplodia theobromae by Alderidge et al in 1971.

== Biosynthesis ==
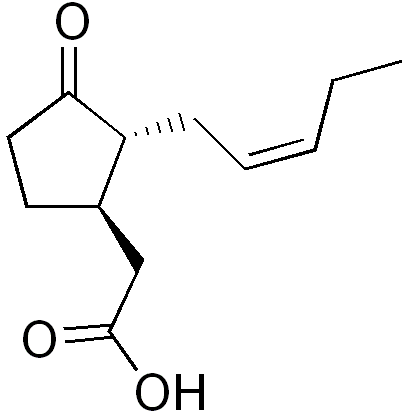
Jasmonic acid (JA)

Methyl JA

Structures of active jasmonate derivatives

Biosynthesis is reviewed by Acosta and Farmer 2010, Wasternack and Hause 2013, and Wasternack and Song 2017. Jasmonates (JA) are oxylipins, i.e. derivatives of oxygenated fatty acid. They are biosynthesized from linolenic acid in chloroplast membranes. Synthesis is initiated with the conversion of linolenic acid to 12-oxo-phytodienoic acid (OPDA), which then undergoes a reduction and three rounds of oxidation to form (+)-7-iso-JA, jasmonic acid. Only the conversion of linolenic acid to OPDA occurs in the chloroplast; all subsequent reactions occur in the peroxisome.

JA itself can be further metabolized into active or inactive derivatives. Methyl JA (MeJA) is a volatile compound that is potentially responsible for interplant communication. JA conjugated with amino acid isoleucine (Ile) results in JA-Ile ((+)-7-iso-jasmonoyl-L-isoleucine), which Fonseca et al 2009 finds is involved in most JA signaling - see also the review by Katsir et al 2008. However Van Poecke & Dicke 2003 finds Arabidopsis's emission of volatiles to not require JA-Ile, nor VanDoorn et al 2011 for Solanum nigrum's herbivore resistance. JA undergoes decarboxylation to give cis-jasmone.

== Function ==
Although jasmonate (JA) regulates many different processes in the plant, its role in wound response is best understood. Following mechanical wounding or herbivory, JA biosynthesis is rapidly activated, leading to expression of the appropriate response genes. For example, in the tomato, wounding produces defense molecules that inhibit leaf digestion in guts of insects. Another indirect result of JA signaling is the volatile emission of JA-derived compounds. MeJA on leaves can travel airborne to nearby plants and elevate levels of transcripts related to wound response. In general, this emission can further upregulate JA biosynthesis and cell signaling, thereby inducing nearby plants to prime their defenses in case of herbivory.

JAs have also been implicated in cell death and leaf senescence. JA can interact with many kinases and transcription factors associated with senescence. JA can also induce mitochondrial death by inducing the accumulation of reactive oxygen species (ROSs). These compounds disrupt mitochondria membranes and compromise the cell by causing apoptosis, or programmed cell death. JAs' roles in these processes are suggestive of methods by which the plant defends itself against biotic challenges and limits the spread of infections.

JA and its derivatives have also been implicated in plant development, symbiosis, and a host of other processes included in the list below.

- By studying mutants overexpressing JA, one of the earliest discoveries made was that JA inhibits root growth. The mechanism behind this event is still not understood, but mutants in the COI1-dependent signaling pathway tend to show reduced inhibition, demonstrating that the COI1 pathway is somehow necessary for inhibiting root growth.
- JA plays many roles in flower development. Mutants in JA synthesis or in JA signaling in Arabidopsis present with male sterility, typically due to delayed development. The same genes promoting male fertility in Arabidopsis promote female fertility in tomatoes. Overexpression of 12-OH-JA can also delay flowering.
- JA and MeJA inhibit the germination of nondormant seeds and stimulate the germination of dormant seeds.
- High levels of JA encourage the accumulation of storage proteins; genes encoding vegetative storage proteins are JA responsive. Specifically, tuberonic acid, a JA derivative, induces the formation of tubers.
- JAs also play a role in symbiosis between plants and microorganisms; however, its precise role is still unclear. JA currently appears to regulate signal exchange and nodulation regulation between legumes and rhizobium. On the other hand, elevated JA levels appear to regulate carbohydrate partitioning and stress tolerance in mycorrhizal plants.

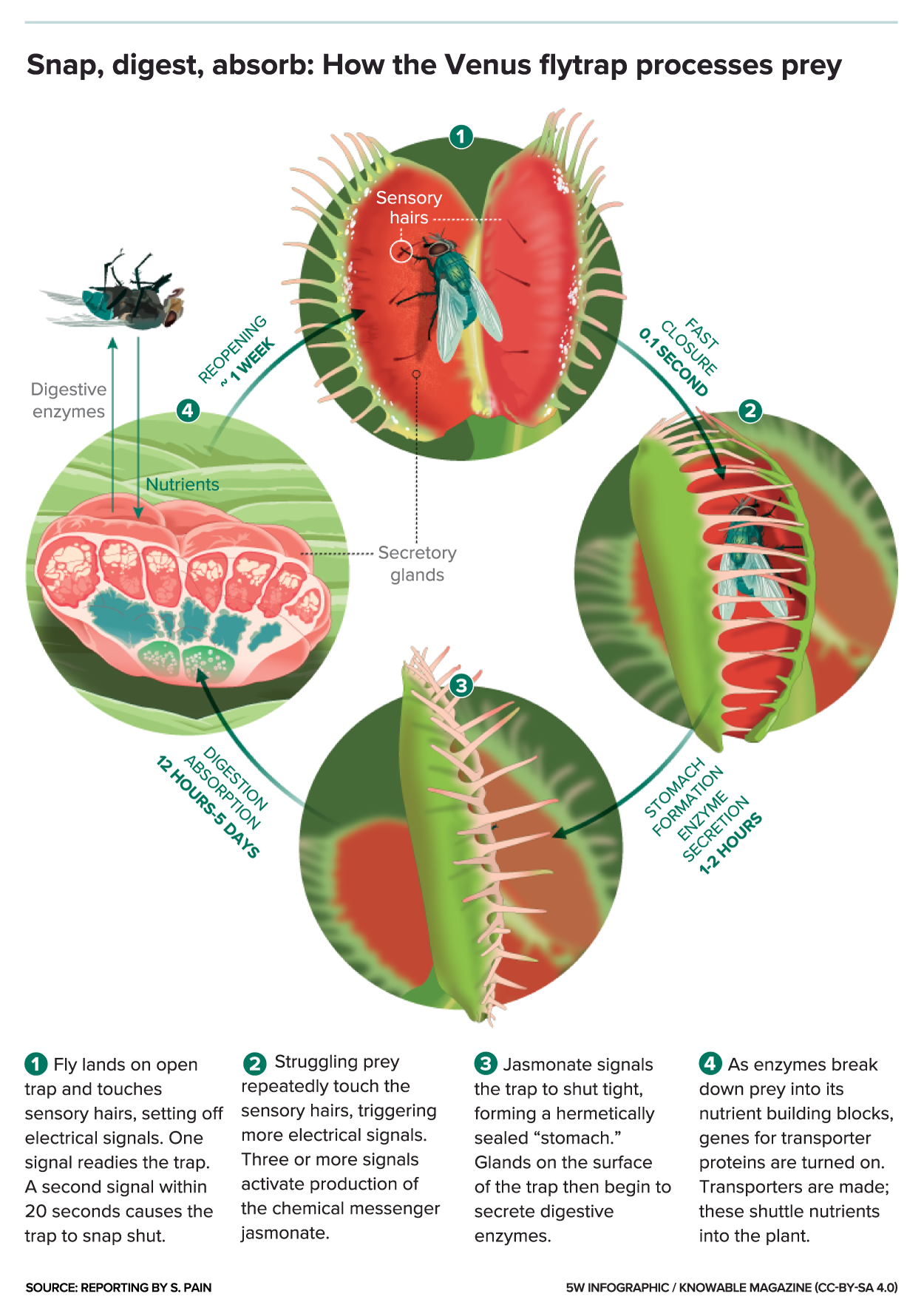
Stages and timing of the Venus flytrap carnivory process, with JA signaling Knowable Magazine

- JAs have been implicated in the development of carnivorous plants such as the Venus flytrap. Research suggests that evolutionary repurposing of the jasmonate signaling pathway, which mediates defense against herbivores in noncarnivorous plants, has supported the evolution of plant carnivory. Jasmonates can be used to signal the closing of traps and to control the release of enzymes and nutrient transporters which are used in plant digestion. However, not all carnivorous plants rely on the jasmonate pathway in the same way. Butterworts differ significantly from Venus flytraps and sundews, and may have developed methods of regulating digestive enzymes that are JA-independent.

=== Role in pathogenesis ===
Pseudomonas syringae causes bacterial speck disease in tomatoes by hijacking the plant's jasmonate (JA) signaling pathway. This bacteria utilizes a type III secretion system to inject a cocktail of viral effector proteins into host cells.

One of the molecules included in this mixture is the phytotoxin coronatine (COR). JA-insensitive plants are highly resistant to P. syringae and unresponsive to COR; additionally, applying MeJA was sufficient to rescue virulence in COR mutant bacteria. Infected plants also expressed downstream JA and wound response genes but repressed levels of pathogenesis-related (PR) genes. All these data suggest COR acts through the JA pathway to invade host plants. Activation of a wound response is hypothesized to come at the expense of pathogen defense. By activating the JA wound response pathway, P. syringae could divert resources from its host's immune system and infect more effectively.

Plants produce N-acylamides that confer resistance to necrotrophic pathogens by activating JA biosynthesis and signalling. Arachidonic acid (AA), the counterpart of the JA precursor α-LeA occurring in metazoan species but not in plants, is perceived by plants and acts through an increase in JA levels concomitantly with resistance to necrotrophic pathogens. AA is an evolutionarily conserved signalling molecule that acts in plants in response to stress similar to that in animal systems.

=== Cross talk with other defense pathways ===
While the jasmonate (JA) pathway is critical for wound response, it is not the only signaling pathway mediating defense in plants. To build an optimal yet efficient defense, the different defense pathways must be capable of cross talk to fine-tune and specify responses to abiotic and biotic challenges.

One of the best studied examples of JA cross talk occurs with salicylic acid (SA). SA, a hormone, mediates defense against pathogens by inducing both the expression of pathogenesis-related genes and systemic acquired resistance (SAR), in which the whole plant gains resistance to a pathogen after localized exposure to it.

Wound and pathogen response appear to be interact negatively. For example, silencing phenylalanine ammonia lyase (PAL), an enzyme synthesizing precursors to SA, reduces SAR but enhances herbivory resistance against insects. Similarly, overexpression of PAL enhances SAR but reduces wound response after insect herbivory. Generally, it has been found that pathogens living in live plant cells are more sensitive to SA-induced defenses, while herbivorous insects and pathogens that derive benefit from cell death are more susceptible to JA defenses. Thus, this trade-off in pathways optimizes defense and saves plant resources.

Cross talk also occurs between JA and other plant hormone pathways, such as those of abscisic acid (ABA) and ethylene (ET). These interactions similarly optimize defense against pathogens and herbivores of different lifestyles. For example, MYC2 activity can be stimulated by both JA and ABA pathways, allowing it to integrate signals from both pathways. Other transcription factors such as ERF1 arise as a result of JA and ET signaling. All these molecules can act in combination to activate specific wound response genes.

Finally, cross talk is not restricted for defense: JA and ET interactions are critical in development as well, and a balance between the two compounds is necessary for proper apical hook development in Arabidopsis seedlings. Still, further research is needed to elucidate the molecules regulating such cross talk.

== Mechanism of signaling ==
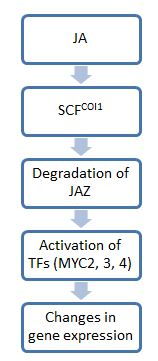
Major components of the jasmonate pathway

In general, the steps in jasmonate (JA) signaling mirror that of auxin signaling: the first step comprises E3 ubiquitin ligase complexes, which tag substrates with ubiquitin to mark them for degradation by proteasomes. The second step utilizes transcription factors to effect physiological changes. One of the key molecules in this pathway is JAZ, which serves as the on-off switch for JA signaling. In the absence of JA, JAZ proteins bind to downstream transcription factors and limit their activity. However, in the presence of JA or its bioactive derivatives, JAZ proteins are degraded, freeing transcription factors for expression of genes needed in stress responses.

Because JAZ did not disappear in null coi1 mutant plant backgrounds, protein COI1 was shown to mediate JAZ degradation. COI1 belongs to the family of highly conserved F-box proteins, and it recruits substrates for the E3 ubiquitin ligase SCF^{COI1}. The complexes that ultimately form are known as SCF complexes. These complexes bind JAZ and target it for proteasomal degradation. However, given the large spectrum of JA molecules, not all JA derivatives activate this pathway for signaling, and the range of those participating in this pathway is unknown. Thus far, only JA-Ile has been shown to be necessary for COI1-mediated degradation of JAZ11. JA-Ile and structurally related derivatives can bind to COI1-JAZ complexes and promote ubiquitination and thus degradation of the latter.

This mechanistic model raises the possibility that COI1 serves as an intracellular receptor for JA signals. Recent research has confirmed this hypothesis by demonstrating that the COI1-JAZ complex acts as a co-receptor for JA perception. Specifically, JA-Ile binds both to a ligand-binding pocket in COI1 and to a 20 amino-acid stretch of the conserved Jas motif in JAZ. This JAZ residue acts as a plug for the pocket in COI1, keeping JA-Ile bound in the pocket. Additionally, Sheard et al 2010 co-purified and subsequently removed inositol pentakisphosphate (InsP_{5}) from COI1, demonstrating InsP_{5} to be a necessary component of the co-receptor and playing a role in potentiating the co-receptor complex. Sheard's results may show varying binding specificity for various SCF^{COI1}-InsP_{5}-JAZ complexes.

Once freed from JAZ, transcription factors can activate genes needed for a specific JA response. The best-studied transcription factors acting in this pathway belong to the MYC family of transcription factors, which are characterized by a basic helix-loop-helix (bHLH) DNA binding motif. These factors (of which there are three, MYC2, 3, and 4) tend to act additively. For example, a plant that has only lost one myc becomes more susceptible to insect herbivory than a normal plant. A plant that has lost all three will be as susceptible to damage as coi1 mutants, which are completely unresponsive to JA and cannot mount a defense against herbivory. However, while all these MYC molecules share functions, they vary greatly in expression patterns and transcription functions. For instance, MYC2 has a greater effect on root growth compared to MYC3 or MYC4.

Additionally, MYC2 will loop back and regulate JAZ expression levels, leading to a negative feedback loop. These transcription factors all have different impacts on JAZ levels after JA signaling. JAZ levels in turn affect transcription factor and gene expression levels. In other words, on top of activating different response genes, the transcription factors can vary JAZ levels to achieve specificity in response to JA signals.
