= Allene oxide cyclase =

allene-oxide cyclase

Identifiers
- EC no.: 5.3.99.6
- CAS no.: 118390-59-3

Databases
- IntEnz: IntEnz view
- BRENDA: BRENDA entry
- ExPASy: NiceZyme view
- KEGG: KEGG entry
- MetaCyc: metabolic pathway
- PRIAM: profile
- PDB structures: RCSB PDB PDBe PDBsum
- Gene Ontology: AmiGO / QuickGO
Search
- PMC: articles
- PubMed: articles
- NCBI: proteins

In enzymology, an allene-oxide cyclase (EC 5.3.99.6) is an enzyme that belongs to the family of isomerases, specifically a class of other intramolecular oxidoreductases. The systematic name of this enzyme class is (9Z)-(13S)-12,13-epoxyoctadeca-9,11,15-trienoate isomerase (cyclizing).

The allene oxide of linolenic acid (i.e., (9Z)-(13S)-12,13-epoxyoctadeca-9,11,15-trienoate) is converted by allene oxide cyclase to jasmonic acid ((15Z)-12-oxophyto-10,15-dienoate).

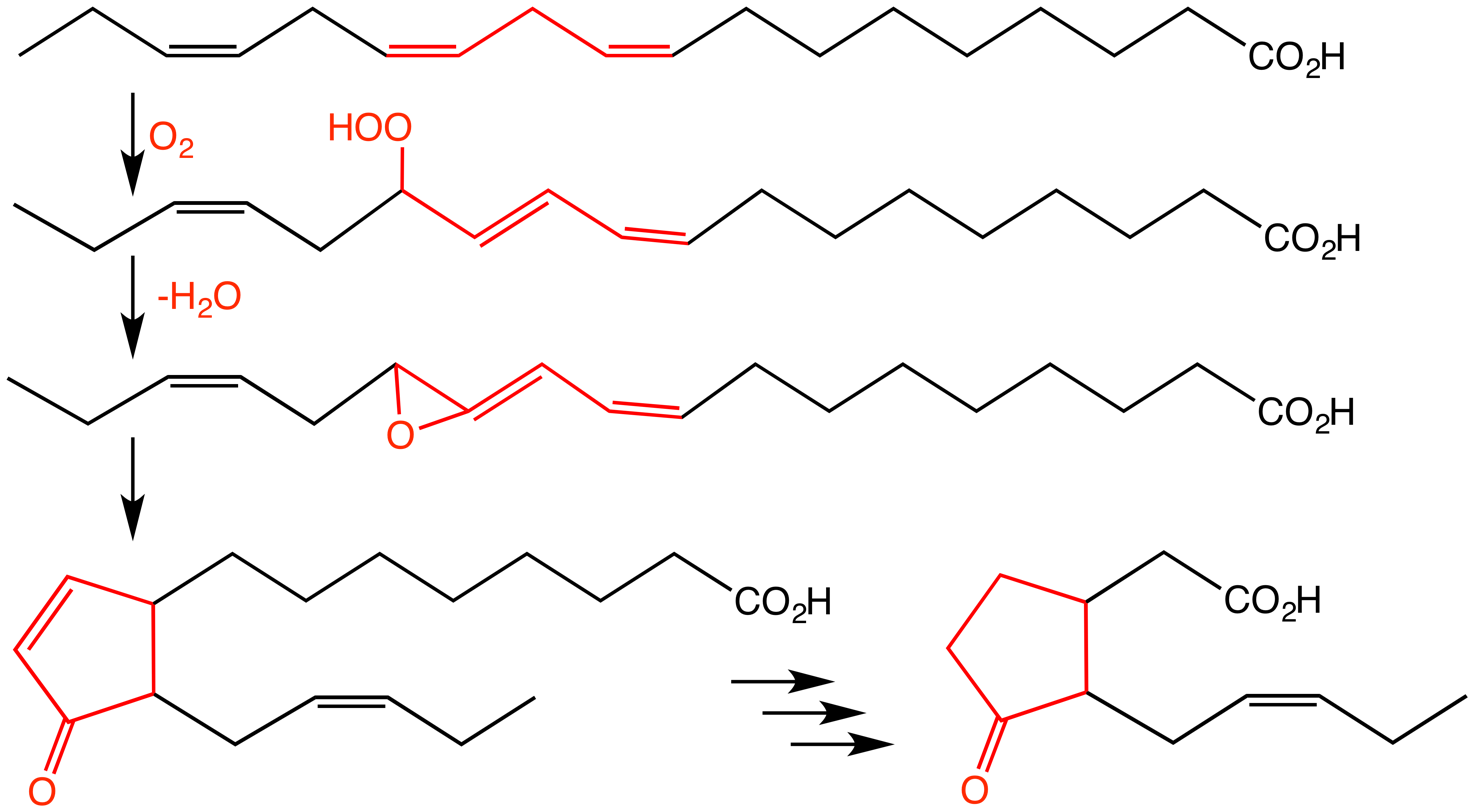
Pathway for biosynthesis of jasmonic acid via allene oxide intermediate. Highlighted is the pentadiene core that is the site of the reactions.

== Structural studies ==
As of late 2007, 6 structures have been solved for this class of enzymes, with PDB accession codes 1Z8K, 1ZVC, 2BRJ, 2DIO, 2GIN, and 2Q4I.
