= Octadecanoid pathway =

Biochemical pathway producing octadecanoids

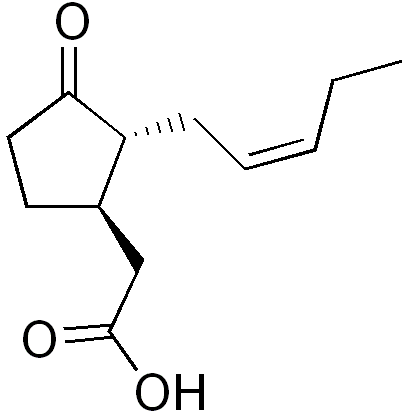
Jasmonic acid

Alpha-linolenic acid

The octadecanoid pathway is a biosynthetic pathway for the production of the phytohormone jasmonic acid (JA), an important hormone for induction of defense genes. JA is synthesized from alpha-linolenic acid, which can be released from the plasma membrane by certain lipase enzymes. For example, in the wound defense response, phospholipase C will cause the release of alpha-linolenic acid for JA synthesis.

In the first step, alpha-linolenic acid is oxidized by the enzyme lipoxygenase. This forms 13-hydroperoxylinolenic acid, which is then modified by a dehydrase and undergoes cyclization by allene oxide cyclase to form 12-oxo-phytodienoic acid. This undergoes reduction and three rounds of beta oxidation to form jasmonic acid.
