= Methyl jasmonate =

- Methyl jasmonate

Names
- IUPAC name Methyl (1R,2R)-3-Oxo-2-(2Z)-2-pentenyl-cyclopentaneacetate
- Other names Methyl jasmonate

Identifiers
CAS Number	1211-29-6
3D model (JSmol)	Interactive image
ChEBI	CHEBI:15929
ChemSpider	4445210
ECHA InfoCard	100.013.562
EC Number	243-497-1
KEGG	C11512
PubChem CID	5281929
UNII	900N171A0F
CompTox Dashboard (EPA)	DTXSID3036731
- InChI: InChI=1S/C13H20O3/c1-3-4-5-6-11-10(7-8-12(11)14)9-13(15)16-2/h4-5,10-11H,3,6-9H2,1-2H3/b5-4-/t10-,11-/m1/s1 Key: GEWDNTWNSAZUDX-WQMVXFAESA-N; InChI=1/C13H20O3/c1-3-4-5-6-11-10(7-8-12(11)14)9-13(15)16-2/h4-5,10-11H,3,6-9H2,1-2H3/b5-4-/t10-,11-/m1/s1 Key: GEWDNTWNSAZUDX-WQMVXFAEBM
- SMILES: O=C1[C@H](C/C=C\CC)[C@@H](CC(OC)=O)CC1

Properties
Chemical formula	C_{13}H_{20}O_{3}
Molar mass	224.3 g/mol
Appearance	Colorless liquid
Melting point	< 25 °C (77 °F; 298 K)
Boiling point	88 to 90 °C (190 to 194 °F; 361 to 363 K) at 0.1 mmHg
- Except where otherwise noted, data are given for materials in their standard state (at 25 °C [77 °F], 100 kPa). verify (what is ?) Infobox references

Methyl jasmonate (abbreviated MeJA) is a volatile organic compound used in plant defense and many diverse developmental pathways such as seed germination, root growth, flowering, fruit ripening, and senescence. Methyl jasmonate is derived from jasmonic acid and the reaction is catalyzed by S-adenosyl-L-methionine:jasmonic acid carboxyl methyltransferase.

== Description ==
Plants produce jasmonic acid and methyl jasmonate in response to many biotic and abiotic stresses (in particular, herbivory and wounding), which build up in the damaged parts of the plant. The methyl jasmonate can be used to signal the original plant's defense systems or it can be spread by physical contact or through the air to produce a defensive reaction in unharmed plants. The unharmed plants absorb the airborne MeJA through either the stomata or diffusion through the leaf cell cytoplasm. An herbivorous attack on a plant causes it to produce MeJA both for internal defense and for a signaling compound to other plants.

== Defense chemicals ==
MeJA can induce the plant to produce multiple different types of defense chemicals such as phytoalexins (antimicrobial), nicotine or protease inhibitors. The protease inhibitors interfere with the insect digestive process and discourage the insect from eating the plant again.

MeJA has been used to stimulate traumatic resin duct production in Norway spruce trees. This can be used as a defense against many insect attackers as a type of vaccine.

== Experiments ==
External application of methyl jasmonate has been shown to induce plant defensive responses against both biotic and abiotic stressors. When treatments of methyl jasmonate were applied to Picea abies (Norway spruce), the accumulation of monoterpene and sesquiterpene compounds doubled in the spruce needle tissues, a response that normally is only triggered when the tissue is damaged.

In an experiment testing the effect of methyl jasmonate treatments on drought tolerance, strawberry plants were shown to alter their metabolism and were better able to withstand water stress and drought conditions by lowering the amount of transpiration, and membrane-lipid peroxidation.

External application of methyl jasmonate has also shown a propensity for inducing an increased resistance to insect herbivory in some agricultural crops, such as brassicas and tobacco. Plants treated with methyl jasmonate and exposed to insect herbivores had significantly lower levels of herbivory, and the insect herbivores had slower development, when compared to untreated plants.

In recent experiments, methyl jasmonate has been shown to be effective at preventing bacterial growth in plants when applied in a spray to the leaves. The antibacterial effect is thought to be because of methyl jasmonate inducing resistance.

MeJA is also a plant hormone involved in tendril (root) coiling, flowering, seed and fruit maturation. An increase of the hormone affects flowering time, flower morphology and the number of open flowers. MeJA induces ethylene-forming enzyme activity, which increases the amount of ethylene to the amount necessary for fruit maturation.

Increased amounts of methyl jasmonate in plant roots have shown to inhibit their growth. It is predicted that the higher amounts of MeJA activate previously unexpressed genes within the roots to cause the growth inhibition.

== Cancer cells ==
Methyl jasmonate induces cytochrome C release in the mitochondria of cancer cells, leading to cell death, but does not harm normal cells. Specifically, it can cause cell death in B-cell chronic lymphocytic leukemia cells taken from human patients with this disease and then treated in tissue culture with methyl jasmonate. Treatment of isolated normal human blood lymphocytes did not result in cell death.

== See also ==
- Jasmonate
- Methyl dihydrojasmonate
