= Β-Lysine =

β-Lysine
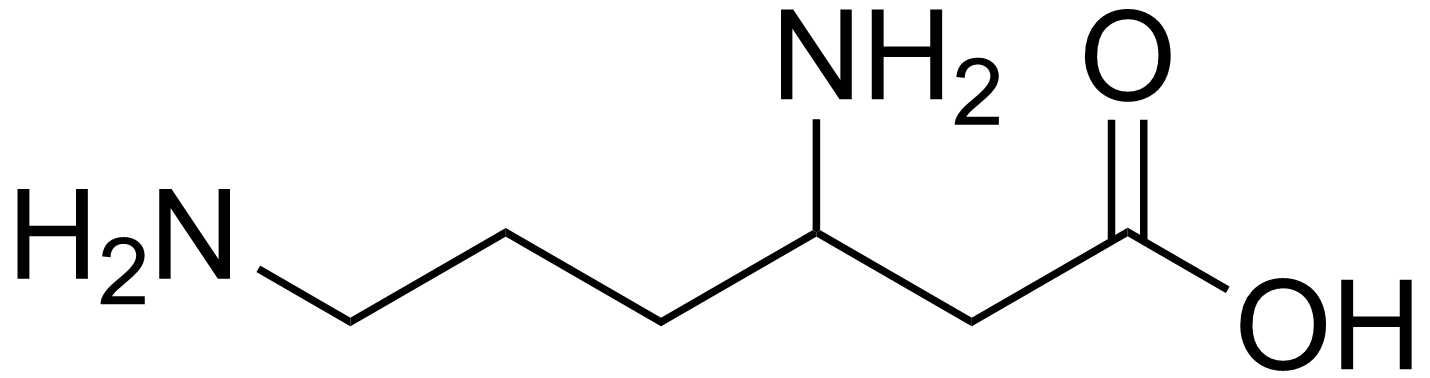

Names
- IUPAC name 3,6-Diaminohexanoic acid

Identifiers
CAS Number	4299-56-3
3D model (JSmol)	Interactive image
ChemSpider	383
PubChem CID	392
UNII	57PAY56Q9J
CompTox Dashboard (EPA)	DTXSID20962838
- InChI: InChI=1S/C6H14N2O2/c7-3-1-2-5(8)4-6(9)10/h5H,1-4,7-8H2,(H,9,10) Key: QKEWQOJCHPFEAF-UHFFFAOYSA-N; InChI=1/C6H14N2O2/c7-3-1-2-5(8)4-6(9)10/h5H,1-4,7-8H2,(H,9,10) Key: QKEWQOJCHPFEAF-UHFFFAOYAC
- SMILES: C(CC(CC(=O)O)N)CN

Properties
Chemical formula	C_{6}H_{14}N_{2}O_{2}
Molar mass	146.190 g·mol^{−1}
- Except where otherwise noted, data are given for materials in their standard state (at 25 °C [77 °F], 100 kPa). verify (what is ?) Infobox references

β-Lysine (3,6-diaminohexanoic acid) is an amino acid produced by platelets during coagulation and is directly antibacterial by causing lysis of many Gram positive bacteria by acting as a cationic detergent. Beta Lysine contains a side chain with an amino group and is the beta form of the amino acid Lysine. Beta-Lysine can hydrogen bond at its carboxylic acid residue. Lysine is an amino acid that acts as a site for ubiquitination enzymes to bind to and branch from. Lysine is a positively charged amino acid due to its amino side chain (that contains an amine). This allows Beta-Lysine to directly interact with the negatively charged phosphate groups within nucleotides.

Beta-lysine is a non-specific immune defense factor that can be found in the blood of many animals, including birds this contributes to the innate immune system. Beta-Lysine in turn, can be a form of measure, of overall immune activity. Beta-Lysine activity is also responsive to many immunomodulators, such as preparations containing bacterial lipopolysaccharides, which increase the musical immune response which then leads to an increase in Beta-Lysine activity, further solidifying Beta-Lysine as an indicator and form of measure for innate immune response.
