= Jasmonic acid =

- Jasmonic acid

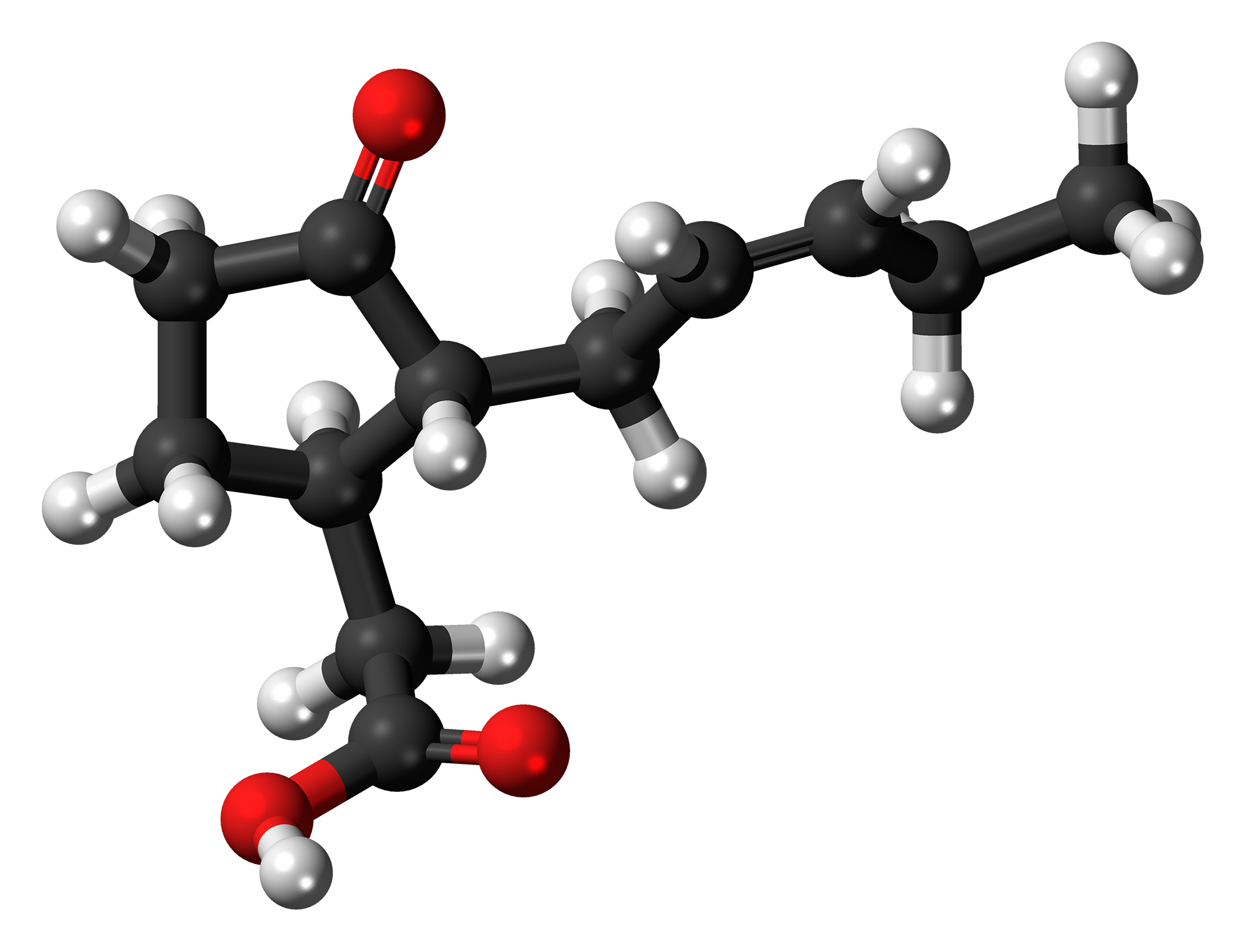

Names
- Preferred IUPAC name {(1R,2R)-3-Oxo-2-[(2Z)-pent-2-en-1-yl]cyclopentyl}acetic acid
- Other names Jasmonic acid (−)-Jasmonic acid JA (1R,2R)-3-Oxo-2-(2Z)-2-pentenylcyclopentylethanoic acid {(1R,2R)-3-Oxo-2-[(2Z)-2-penten-1-yl]cyclopentyl}acetic acid

Identifiers
CAS Number	6894-38-8
3D model (JSmol)	Interactive image
ChEBI	CHEBI:18292
ChemSpider	4444606
PubChem CID	5281166
UNII	6RI5N05OWW
CompTox Dashboard (EPA)	DTXSID4037665
- InChI: InChI=1S/C12H18O3/c1-2-3-4-5-10-9(8-12(14)15)6-7-11(10)13/h3-4,9-10H,2,5-8H2,1H3,(H,14,15)/b4-3-/t9-,10-/m1/s1 Key: ZNJFBWYDHIGLCU-HWKXXFMVSA-N; InChI=1/C12H18O3/c1-2-3-4-5-10-9(8-12(14)15)6-7-11(10)13/h3-4,9-10H,2,5-8H2,1H3,(H,14,15)/b4-3-/t9-,10-/m1/s1 Key: ZNJFBWYDHIGLCU-HWKXXFMVBZ
- SMILES: CC/C=C\C[C@@H]1[C@H](CCC1=O)CC(=O)O

Properties
Chemical formula	C_{12}H_{18}O_{3}
Molar mass	210.27 g/mol
Density	1.1 g/cm^{3}
Boiling point	160 °C (320 °F; 433 K) at 0.7 mmHg
- Except where otherwise noted, data are given for materials in their standard state (at 25 °C [77 °F], 100 kPa). verify (what is ?) Infobox references

Jasmonic acid (JA) is an organic compound found in several plants including jasmine. The molecule is a member of the jasmonate class of plant hormones. It is biosynthesized from linolenic acid by the octadecanoid pathway. It was first isolated in 1957, in methyl ester form, by the Swiss chemist Édouard Demole and his colleagues.

== Biosynthesis ==
JA is common across plant species, with its biosynthesis beginning inside the chloroplast and ending in the cell's peroxisome. Its biosynthesis starts from the fatty acid linolenic acid, which is oxygenated by lipoxygenase (13-LOX), forming a hydroperoxide. This peroxide then cyclizes in the presence of allene oxide synthase to form an allene oxide. The rearrangement of allene oxide to form 12-oxophytodienoic acid is catalyzed by the enzyme allene oxide cyclase. A series of β-oxidations results in 7-isojasmonic acid. In the absence of enzyme, this isojasmonic acid isomerizes to jasmonic acid. JA is conjugated with the amino acid L-isoleucine by the enzyme jasmonate resistant 1 (JAR1) to form (+)-7-iso-jasmonoyl-L-isoleucine, which serves as a key signaling molecule.

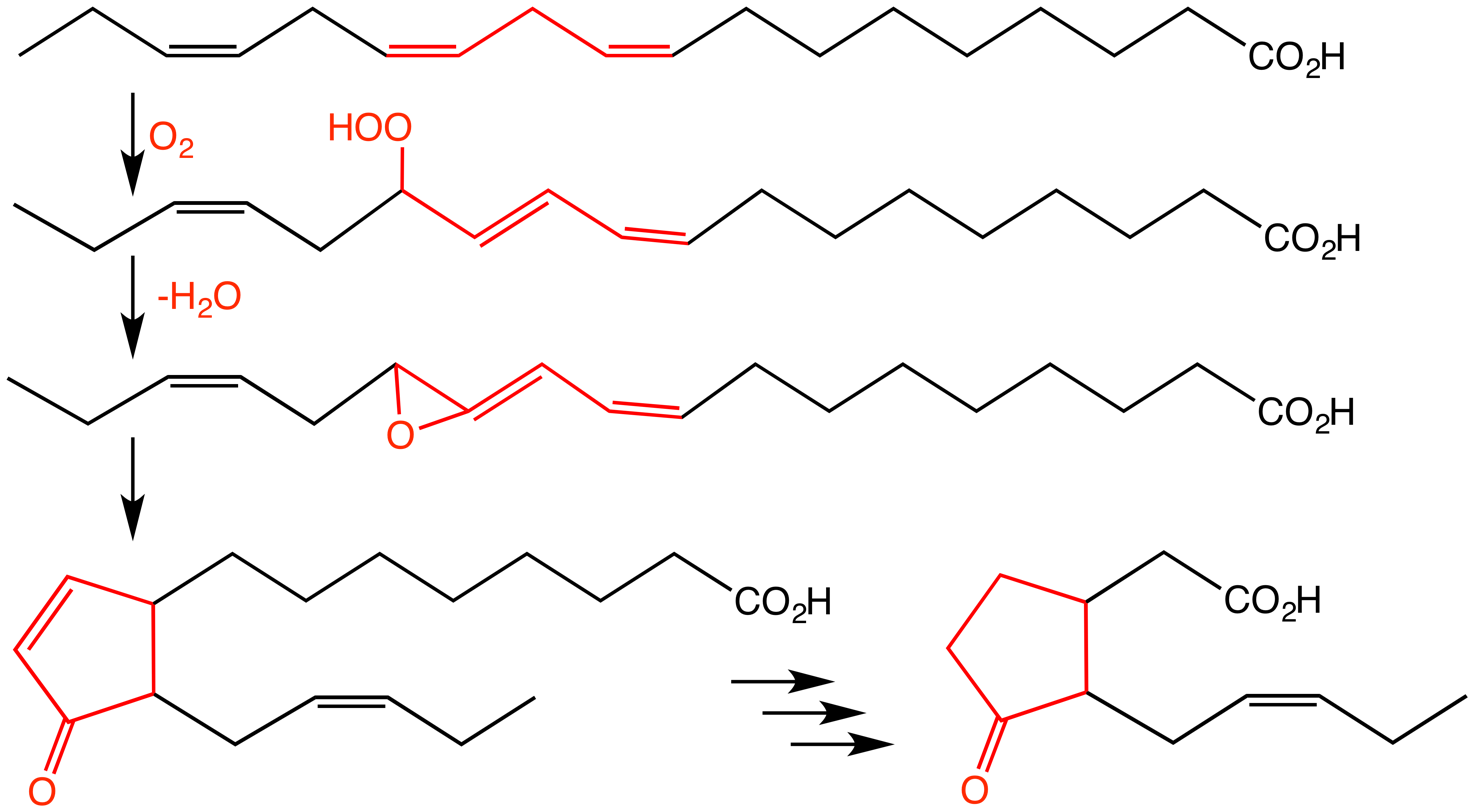
Pathway for biosynthesis of jasmonic acid via allene oxide intermediate. Highlighted is the pentadiene core that is the site of the reactions.

== Function ==
The major function of JA and its various metabolites is regulating plant responses to abiotic and biotic stresses as well as plant growth and development. Regulated plant growth and development processes include growth inhibition, senescence, tendril coiling, flower development and leaf abscission. Mechanical stimulation, such as wind, activates jasmonic acid synthesis, which lead to shorter, thicker stems to increase plant stability. JA is also responsible for tuber formation in potatoes and yams. Additionally, JA acts as a key regulator of root development, high concentrations inhibit primary root elongation while promoting lateral root formation. It has an important role in response to wounding of plants and systemic acquired resistance. The Dgl gene is responsible for maintaining levels of JA during usual conditions in Zea mays as well as the preliminary release of jasmonic acid shortly after being fed upon. When plants are attacked by insects, they respond by releasing JA, which activates the expression of protease inhibitors, among many other anti-herbivore defense compounds. These protease inhibitors prevent proteolytic activity of the insects' digestive proteases or "salivary proteins", thereby stopping them from acquiring the needed nitrogen in the protein for their own growth. JA also activates the expression of Polyphenol oxidase which promotes the production of quinolines. These can interfere with the insect's enzyme production and decrease the nutrition content of the ingested plant.

JA may have a role in pest control. Indeed, JA has been considered as a seed treatment in order to stimulate the natural anti-pest defenses of the plants that germinate from the treated seeds. In this application jasmonates are sprayed onto plants that have already started growing. These applications stimulate the production of protease inhibitor in the plant. This production of protease inhibitor can protect the plant from insects, decreasing infestation rates and physical damage sustained due to herbivores. However, due to its antagonistic relationship with salicylic acid (an important signal in pathogen defense) in some plant species, it may result in an increased susceptibility to viral agents and other pathogens. In Zea mays, salicylic acid and JA are mediated by NPR1 (nonexpressor of pathogenesis-related genes1), which is essential in preventing herbivores from exploiting this antagonistic system. Armyworms (Spodoptera caterpillars), through unknown mechanisms, are able to increase the activity of the salicylic acid pathway in maize, resulting in the depression of JA synthesis, but thanks to NPR1 mediation, JA levels aren't decreased by a significant amount. At the molecular level, the main signaling pathway depends on the build-up of bioactive jasmonoyl-isoleucine. This encourages binding to the coronatine insensitive 1 (COI1) and jasmonate zim-domain (JAZ) repressor proteins. This targets JAZ proteins for degradation, which allows transcription factors to activate jasmonate responsive genes. The regulating of JA biosynthesis, inactivation, perception, and signaling enables plants to fine tune its responses to changing environmental conditions.

== Derivatives ==
Jasmonic acid is also converted to a variety of derivatives including the ester methyl jasmonate. This conversion is catalyzed by the jasmonic acid carboxyl methyltransferase enzyme. It can also be conjugated to amino acids in some biological contexts. Decarboxylation affords the related fragrance jasmone.
