= C28H48O6 =

The molecular formula C_{28}H_{48}O_{6} (molar mass: 480.69 g/mol, exact mass: 480.3451 u) may refer to:

- Brassinolide
- 24-Epibrassinolide
