= Systemin =

Plant peptide hormone

Prosystemin

Identifiers
- Symbol: Prosystemin
- Pfam: PF07376
- InterPro: IPR009966
Available protein structures:
- PDB: IPR009966 PF07376 (ECOD; PDBsum)
- AlphaFold: IPR009966; PF07376

Systemin
- Structural formula of tomato systemin

Identifiers
- Organism: S. lycopersicum (tomato)
- Symbol: systemin
- Entrez: 543989
- RefSeq (mRNA): M84800
- RefSeq (Prot): AAA34182
- UniProt: P27058
Search for
- Structures: Swiss-model
- Domains: InterPro

Elicitor peptide 1

Identifiers
- Organism: Arabidopsis thaliana
- Symbol: PROPEP1
- Alt. symbols: AtPep1
- Entrez: 836613
- RefSeq (mRNA): NM_125888
- RefSeq (Prot): NP_569001
- UniProt: Q9LV87

Other data
- Chromosome: 5: 25.94 - 25.94 Mb
Search for
- Structures: Swiss-model
- Domains: InterPro

Hydroxyproline-rich systemin

Identifiers
- Organism: S. lycopersicum (tomato)
- Symbol: HypSys
- Entrez: 543883
- RefSeq (mRNA): AY292201
- RefSeq (Prot): AAQ19087
- UniProt: Q7XAD0
Search for
- Structures: Swiss-model
- Domains: InterPro

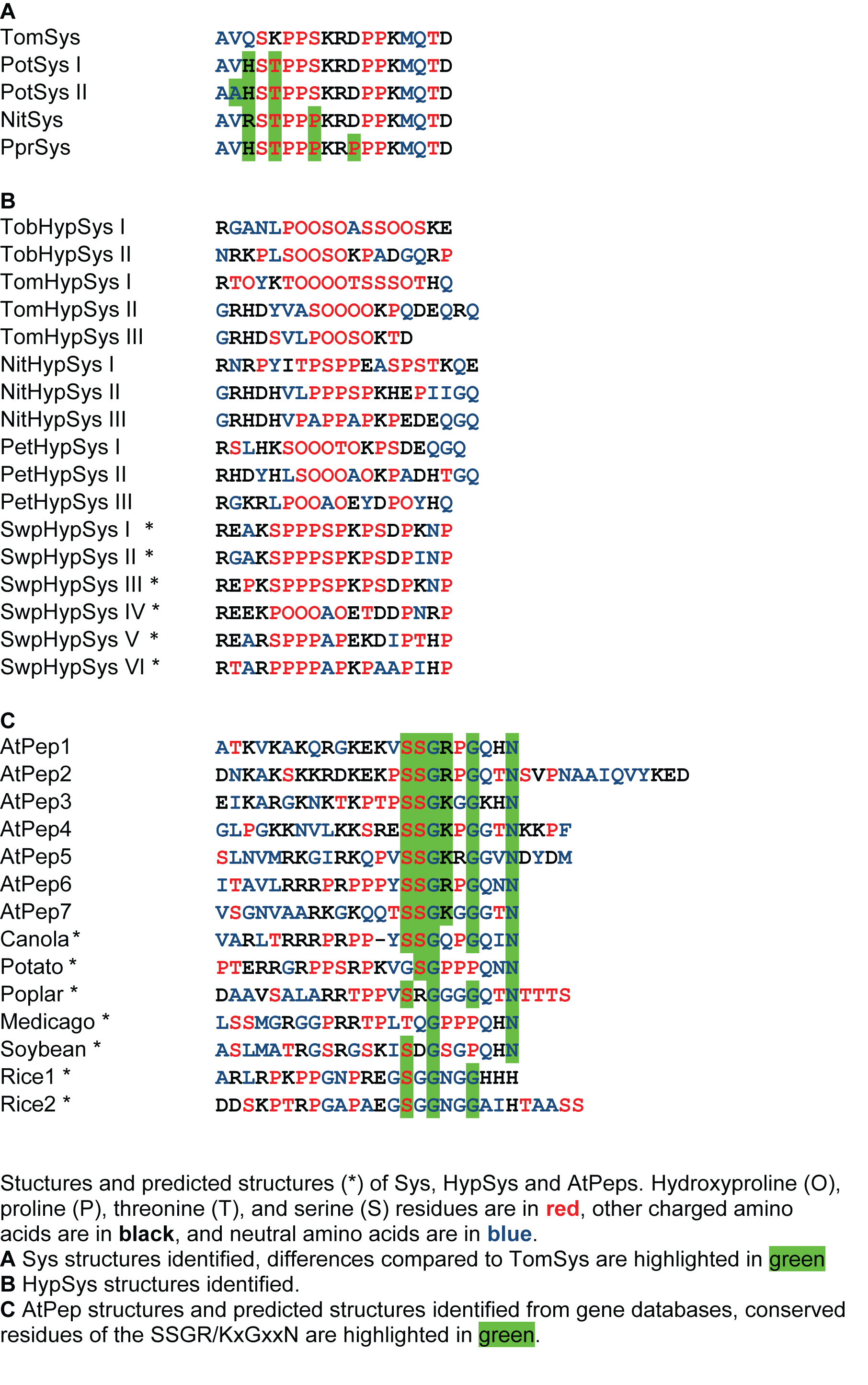
Structures and predicted structures of systemins, HypSys and AtPeps

Systemin is a plant peptide hormone involved in the wound response in the family Solanaceae. It was the first plant hormone that was proven to be a peptide having been isolated from tomato leaves in 1991 by a group led by Clarence A. Ryan. Since then, other peptides with similar functions have been identified in tomato and outside of the Solanaceae. Hydroxyproline-rich glycopeptides were found in tobacco in 2001 and AtPeps (Arabidopsis thaliana Plant Elicitor Peptides) were found in Arabidopsis thaliana in 2006. Their precursors are found both in the cytoplasm and cell walls of plant cells, upon insect damage, the precursors are processed to produce one or more mature peptides. The receptor for systemin was first thought to be the same as the brassinolide receptor but this is now uncertain. The signal transduction processes that occur after the peptides bind are similar to the cytokine-mediated inflammatory immune response in animals. Early experiments showed that systemin travelled around the plant after insects had damaged the plant, activating systemic acquired resistance, now it is thought that it increases the production of jasmonic acid causing the same result. The main function of systemins is to coordinate defensive responses against insect herbivores but they also affect plant development. Systemin induces the production of protease inhibitors which protect against insect herbivores, other peptides activate defensins and modify root growth. They have also been shown to affect plants' responses to salt stress and UV radiation. AtPEPs have been shown to affect resistance against oomycetes and may allow A. thaliana to distinguish between different pathogens. In Nicotiana attenuata, some of the peptides have stopped being involved in defensive roles and instead affect flower morphology.

== Discovery and structure ==
In 1991 a research group led by Clarence A. Ryan, isolated an 18 amino acid polypeptide from tomato leaves that induced the production of protease inhibitor proteins (PIs) in response to wounding. Experiments using synthetic radio-labelled forms of the polypeptide demonstrated that it was able to travel systemically through the plant and induce PI production in unwounded leaves. Because of the systemic nature of the wounding signal, it was named systemin, it was the first polypeptide found to function as a hormone in plants. mRNA encoding for systemin is found in all tissues of the plant except the roots. Later studies identified homologs of tomato systemin in other members of the Solanaceae including potato, black nightshade and bell pepper. Systemins have only been identified in the Solaneae subtribe of the Solanaceae, but other members of the family, such as tobacco, also respond to wounding by systemically producing protease inhibitors.

=== Peptides with similar functions ===
In 2001, biologically active hydroxyproline-rich glycopeptides were isolated from tobacco which activated the production of protease inhibitors in a similar way to systemin in tomatoes. Although they are structurally unrelated to systemins, their similar function resulted in them being named hydroxyproline-rich systemins (HypSys). Following the initial discovery other HypSys peptides were found in tomato, Petunia and black nightshade. In 2007, HypSys were found outside the Solanaceae, in sweet potato (Ipomoea batatas) and sequence analysis identified HypSys analogs in poplar (Populus trichocarpa) and coffee (Coffea canephora). Systemins are highly conserved between species, whereas HypSys are more divergent but all contain a conserved proline or hydroxyproline-rich central domain.

In 2006, AtPEP1, a 23 amino acid polypeptide was isolated from Arabidopsis thaliana, which was found to activate components of the innate immune response. Unlike HypSys, AtPEP1 is not post-translationally modified by hydroxylation or glycosylation. Six paralogs of the precursor have been identified in A. thaliana as well as orthologs in grape, rice, maize, wheat, barley, canola, soybean, medicago and poplar, although the activity of these orthologs has not been tested in assays. The predicted structures of the paralogs of AtPEP1 are varied within A. thaliana but all contain a SSGR/KxGxxN sequence motif. The orthologs identified in other species are more varied but still contain components of the sequence motif.

== Localisation and precursors ==
Systemin and AtPEP1 are found in the cell cytosol. The precursor to tomato systemin is transcribed as a 200 amino acid polypeptide. It does not contain a putative signal sequence suggesting that it is synthesised on free ribosomes in the cytosol. The precursor to AtPEP1 is a 92 amino acid polypeptide and also lacks a signal sequence. In tomato, mRNA encoding the precursor for systemin is present at very low levels in unwounded leaves but accumulates upon wounding, particularly in the cells surrounding the sieve elements of the phloem in vascular bundles of mid veins. The precursor accumulates exclusively in the phloem parenchyma cells of leaves in tomato after wounding. The precursor to potato systemin is also localised in a similar manner suggesting it is under the same cell-type-specific regulation in both species.

HypSys are localised in the cell wall. The precursor for tobacco HypSys is transcribed as a 165 amino acid polypeptide which has no structural homology to the precursor for systemin in tomato. The structural properties of HypSys, containing hydroxyproline and being glycosylated, indicate that they are synthesised through the secretory system. The precursor to HypSys in tomato is a 146 amino acid polypeptide, exclusively synthesised within the vascular bundles of leaves and petioles associated with parenchyma cells of phloem bundles. Unlike systemin, it is primarily associated with the cell wall. The precursors to HypSys appear to represent a distinct subfamily of hydroxyproline-rich proteins found in cell walls. Upon wounding it is thought that a protease from the cytosol, the cell wall matrix, or the pathogen, processes the precursor producing active HypSys peptides.

=== Processing of precursors ===
The precursors for systemin and AtPEP1 are both processed to yield one active peptide from the C-terminus of the precursor. It has been speculated that ProAtPEP1 is processed by CONSTITUTIVE DISEASE RESISTANCE 1, an apoplastic aspartic protease. The precursors to HypSys are processed into more than one active peptide. In tobacco, it is processed into two peptides, in petunia into three, and in sweet potato, possibly into six. At 291 amino acids long, the precursor to HypSys in sweet potato is the longest precursor described. The production of multiple signalling peptides from one precursor is a common feature found in animals.

== Receptors ==
Exceedingly small amounts of tomato systemin are active, femto-molar concentrations of the peptide are sufficient to elicit a response at the whole plant level, making it one of the most potent gene activators identified. A receptor for tomato systemin was identified as a 160KDa leucine-rich repeat receptor like kinase (LRR-RLK), SR160. After being isolated it was found that was very similar in structure to BRI1 from A. thaliana, the receptor that brassinolides bind to on the cell membrane. This was the first receptor which was found to be able to bind both a steroid and a peptide ligand and also to be involved in both defensive and developmental responses. Recent studies have found that the initial conclusion that BRI1 is the receptor for tomato systemin may be incorrect. In cu3 mutants of tomato, a null allele with a stop codon present in the extracellular LRR domain of BRI1 prevents the receptor from being localised correctly and it also lacks the kinase domain, required for signalling. These mutants are insensitive to brassinolide yet still respond to tomato systemin by producing protease inhibitors and causing an alkalisation response. This led Holton et al. to suggest that there is another mechanism by which systemin is perceived. Further investigation showed that binding of systemin to BRI1 does not cause the receptor to become phosphorylated, as when brassinolides bind, suggesting that it does not transduce a signal. When BRI1 is silenced in tomato, the plants have a similar phenotype to cu3 mutants yet are still able to respond normally to systemin, strengthening the view that BRI1 is not the systemin receptor.

In 1994, tomato systemin was found to bind to a 50KDa protein in the cell membrane of tomato. The protein has a structure similar to proteases of the Kex2p-like prohormone convertases. This led Schaller and Ryan to suggest that it is not a receptor, but instead is involved in the processing of ProSys into the active form, or the degradation of Sys. Synthetic forms of tomato systemin, with substituted amino acids at the predicted dibasic cleavage site, remained stable in cell cultures for longer than the native form. Later studies have noted that the enzymes responsible for processing ProSys remain unidentified. No further research has been reported on the 50KDa protein to date, and the gene has not been identified.

No receptors for HypSys have so far been reported, but it is thought that they are perceived on the cell membrane by a LRR-RLK.

The receptor for AtPep1 has been identified as a 170KDa LRR-RLK and has been named AtPEPR1. AtPep1 is active at 0.1 nano-molar (nM) concentrations and the receptor saturates at 1nM. An analysis of the structure of the AtPEPR1 receptor has shown that it is a member of the LRR XI subfamily of LRR-RLKs in A. thaliana which includes the receptor for another peptide hormone CLAVATA3. Transforming tobacco cell cultures with AtPEPR1 allowed them to respond to AtPep1 in an alkalisation assay, whereas normal tobacco did not show such a response. BRI1-associated receptor kinase 1 (BAK1) is an LRR-RLK found in A. thaliana, which has been proposed to function as an adaptor protein that is required for the proper functioning of other RLKs. Yeast two-hybrid assays have shown that AtPEPR1 and its closest analog, AtPEPR2, interact with BAK1.

== Signal transduction ==
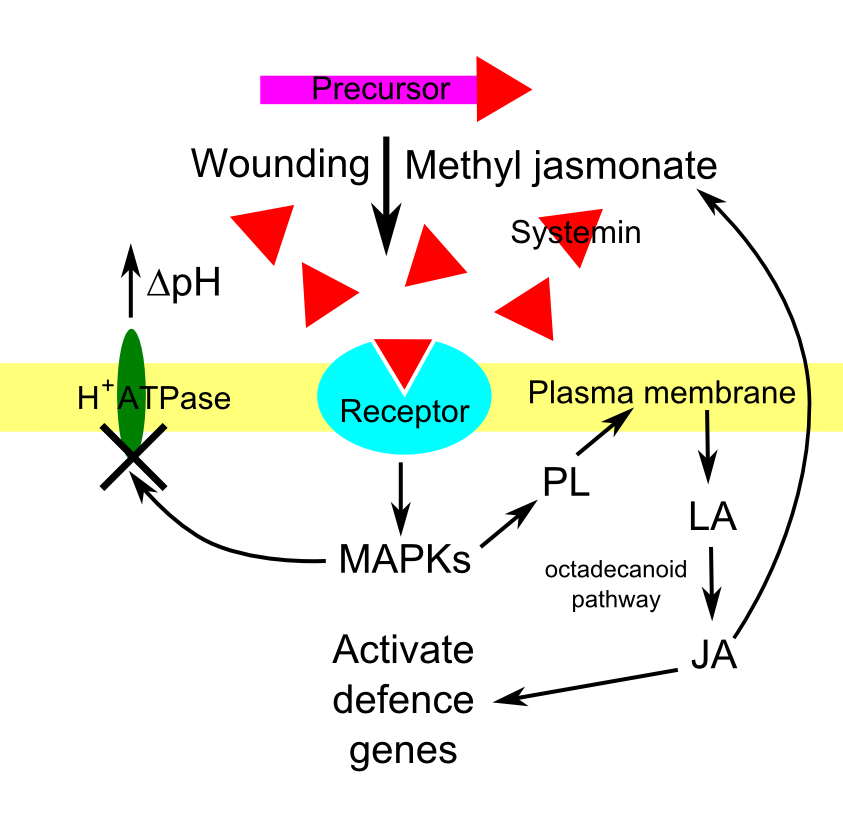
Proposed system of signal transduction for systemin. MAPKs = Mitogen-activated protein kinases PL = Phospholipase JA = Jasmonic acid LA = Linolenic acid

Although the receptors for systemins and HypSys remain poorly understood, we have a better understanding of the signal transduction that occurs once the peptide had bound to its receptor. Jasmonic acid is an essential, albeit late component, in the systemin and wound-signalling pathways. In tomato, the signal is transduced from the receptor by mitogen-activated protein kinases (MAPKs). Cosilencing of two MAPKs, MPK1 and MPK2, in tomato compromised their defence response against insect larvae compared to wild type plants. Cosilencing these genes also decreased production of jasmonic acid and of jasmonic acid-dependent defence genes. Applying methyl jasmonate to cosilenced plants rescued them, indicating that jasmonates are the signal responsible for causing changes in gene expression. The alkalisation of the apoplast is a downstream effect of signalling processing by MAPKs. Applying fusicoccin, which activates the H^{+} ATPase inhibited by systemin, along with systemin still activates MAPKs, even though the pH of the apoplast does not change.

Within minutes of systemin perception, the cytosolic Ca^{2+} concentration increases, and linolenic acid is released from cell membranes after a phospholipase has been activated. Linolenic acid is then converted to jasmonic acid via the octadecanoid pathway and jasmonic acid activates defensive genes. Production of methyl jasmonate is induced by systemins and also upregulates systemin precursor genes creating a feedback loop, amplifying the defensive signal. Methyl jasmonate is volatile and can therefore activate systemic acquired resistance in neighbouring plants, preparing their defences for attack. These signalling events are analogous to the cytokine-mediated inflammatory immune response in animals. When the inflammatory response is activated in animals, MAPKs are activated which in turn activate phospholipases. Lipids in the membrane are converted to arachidonic acid and then to prostaglandins, which are analogs of jasmonic acid. Both pathways can be inhibited by suramin.

Early experiments with radiolabelled systemin in tomato demonstrated that it is transported through the phloem sap in tomato plants and was therefore thought to be the systemic signal that activated systemic acquired resistance. This view was challenged by grafting experiments which showed that mutants deficient in jasmonic acid biosynthesis and perception were unable to activate systemic acquired resistance. It is now thought that jasmonic acid is the systemic signal and that systemin upregulates the pathways for jasmonic acid synthesis.

== Functions ==
=== Defence ===
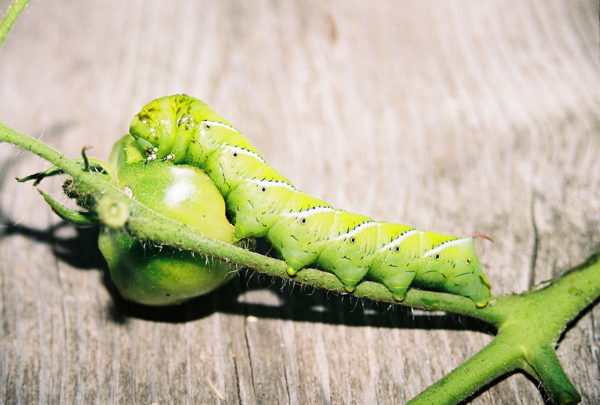
Systemin activates processes which help tomato deter insect herbivores, such as this tomato hornworm

Systemin plays a critical role in defence signalling in tomato. It promotes the synthesis of over 20 defence-related proteins, mainly antinutritional proteins, signaling pathway proteins and proteases. The over-expression of the prosystemin resulted in a significant decrease of the larvae damage, indicating that a high level of constitutive protection is superior to an inducible defence mechanism. However, the continuous activation of prosystemin is costly, affecting the growth, the physiology and the reproductive success of tomato plants. When systemin was silenced, production of protease inhibitors in tomato was severely impaired and larvae feeding on the plants grew three times as fast. HypSys caused similar changes in gene expression in tobacco, for example polyphenol oxidase activity increased tenfold in tobacco leaves and protease inhibitors caused a 30% decrease in chymotrypsin activity within three days of wounding. When HypSys was over-expressed in tobacco, larvae feeding on transgenic plants weighed half as much after ten days feeding, as those feeding on normal plants. The concentration of hydrogen peroxide increased in the vasculature tissues when the production of systemin, HypSys or AtPep1 is induced, this may also be involved in initiating systemic acquired resistance.

Tomato plants over-expressing systemin also accumulated HypSys but did not if the systemin precursor was silenced, indicating that in tomato, HypSys is controlled by systemin. Each of the three HypSys peptides in tomato is able to activate the synthesis and accumulation of protease inhibitors. When HypSys is silenced the production of protease inhibitors induced by wounding is halved compared to wild type plants indicating that both systemin and HypSys are required for a strong defence response against herbivores in tomato.

When applied through cut petioles in Petunia, HypSys did not induce the production of protease inhibitors, but instead increased expression of defensin, a gene which produces a protein that inserts into microbial membranes, forming a pore. Defensin expression is also induced by AtPEP1.

Tomato plants over-expressing systemin produced more volatile organic compounds (VOCs) than normal plants and parasitoid wasps found them more attractive. Systemin also upregulates the expression of genes involved in the production of biologically active VOCs. Such a response is crucial if antinutritional defences are to be effective, since without predators, developing insects would consume more plant material while completing their development. It is likely that VOC production is upregulated through different pathways, including oxylipin pathway that synthesises jasmonic acid aldehydes and alcohols that function in wound healing.

Different AtPeps may allow A. thaliana to distinguish between different pathogens. When inoculated with a fungus, oomycete and a bacterium, the increases in AtPep expression varied depending on the pathogen. A. thaliana overexpressing AtProPep1 was more resistant to the oomycete Phythium irregulare.

Silencing systemin did not affect the ability of black nightshade to resist herbivory and, when competing against normal plants, silenced plants produced more above-ground biomass and berries. Upon herbivory, systemin was down-regulated in black nightshade in contrast to the other peptides which are up-regulated after herbivory. By contrast HypSys were up-regulated and activated the synthesis of protease inhibitors. The down-regulation of systemin was associated with increased root mass but did not decrease shoot mass, demonstrating that systemin can cause developmental changes as a result of herbivory, allowing the plant to tolerate, rather than directly resist attack. Tomato roots were also affected by tomato systemin, with root growth increasing at high tomato systemin concentrations. By allocating more resources to the roots, plants under attack are thought to store carbon and then use it to re-grow when the attack ends. Overexpressing AtPEP1 also increased root and shoot biomass in A. thaliana.

=== Abiotic stress resistance ===
Overexpression of systemin and HypSys has been found to improve plants' tolerance to abiotic stress, including salt stress and UV radiation. When prosystemin was over-expressed in tomato, transgenic plants had lower stomatal conductance than normal plants. When grown in salt solutions, transgenic plants had higher stomatal conductances, lower leaf concentrations of abscisic acid and proline and a higher biomass. These findings suggest that systemin either allowed the plants to adapt to salt stress more efficiently or that they perceived a less stressful environment. Similarly, wounded tomato plants were less susceptible to salt stress than unwounded plants. This may be because wounding decreases the growth of the plant and therefore slows the uptake of toxic ions into the roots. An analysis of salt-induced changes in gene expression found that the differences measured between the transgenic and normal plants could not be accounted for by changes in conventional salt stress-induced pathways. Instead Orsini et al. suggested that the activation of the jasmonic acid pathway determines a physiological state that not only directs resources towards the production of compounds active against pests, but also pre-adapts plants to minimize water loss. These effects are achieved by negatively regulating the production of hormones and metabolites that will force plants to invest additional resources to counteract water loss, a secondary effect of herbivores.

Plants grown under UVB light are more resistant to insect herbivory compared with plants grown under filters that exclude the radiation. When tomato plants are exposed to a pulse of UVB radiation and then weakly wounded, PIs accumulate throughout the plant. By themselves, neither the radiation nor weak wounding is sufficient to induce systemic PI accumulation. Tomato cell cultures respond similarly, with systemin and UVB acting together to activate MAPKs. Short pulses of UVB also cause alkalisation of the culturing medium.

=== Development ===
In Nicotiana attenuata HypSys is known to not be involved in defence against insect herbivores. Silencing and over-expression of HypSys does not affect the feeding performance of larvae compared to normal plants. Berger silenced HypSys and found that it caused changes in flower morphology which reduced the efficiency of self-pollination. The flowers had pistils that protruded beyond their anthers, a similar phenotype to CORONATINE-INSENSITIVE1-silenced plants which lack a jasmonate receptor. Measurement of jasmonate levels in the flowers revealed that they were lower than in normal plants. The authors suggested that HypSys peptides in N. attenuata have diversified from their function as defence related peptides to being involved in controlling flower morphology. The signalling processes remain similar however, being mediated through jasmonates.

Systemin also increases root growth in Solanum pimpinellifolium suggesting that it may also play some role in plant development.

== See also ==
- Plant hormones
- Florigen
