= Leucine-rich repeat receptor like protein kinase =

Leucine-rich repeat receptor-like protein kinase PEPR1
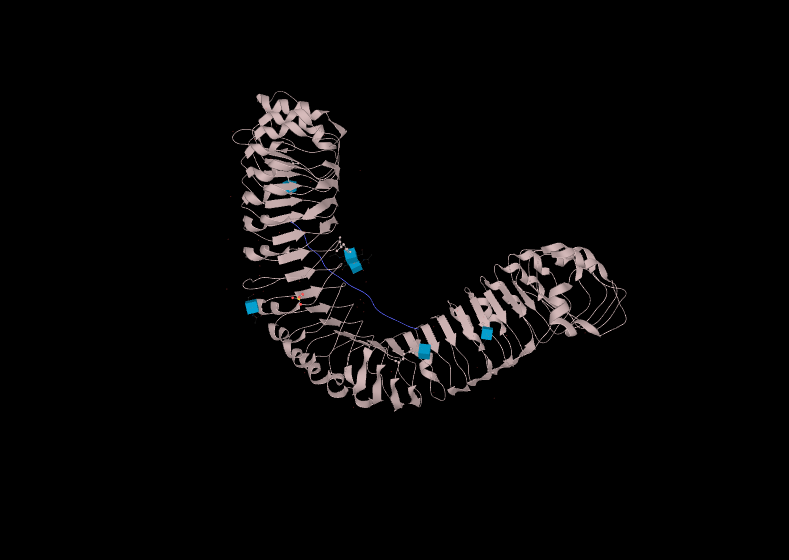

Identifiers
- Symbol: PEPR 1
- Pfam: PF00069
- InterPro: IPR021157
- SMART: SM00369
- SCOP2: 5GR8 / SCOPe / SUPFAM
- Membranome: 737
Available protein structures:
- PDB: IPR021157 PF00069 (ECOD; PDBsum)
- AlphaFold: IPR021157; PF00069

Leucine-rich repeat receptor like protein kinase (PEPR1 and PEPR2 in Arabidopsis thaliana and Xa21 in rice) are plant cell membrane localized Leucine-rich repeat (LRR) receptor kinase that play critical roles in plant innate immunity. Plants have evolved intricate immunity mechanism to combat against pathogen infection by recognizing Pathogen Associated Molecular Patterns (PAMP) and endogenous Damage Associated Molecular Patterns (DAMP). PEPR 1 considered as the first known DAMP receptor of Arabidopsis.

== Discovery ==
First isolation of AtPEPR 1 was carried out from the surface of Arabidopsis suspension cultured cells. I -125 labeled Azido-cys-AtPEP 1 photo affinity analog specifically interacted with PEPR 1 when incubated with Arabidopsis cells. Separation of this labeled protein using SDS- PAGE led to the identification of the 170 kDa PEPR 1 protein. Further, characterization helped to identify a gene; At1g73080 which encodes for 1,124 amino acids containing PEPR 1.

== Function in plant innate immunity ==
Plasma membrane localized pattern recognition receptors (PRR) that recognized pathogen associated molecular patterns, provide the first line of defense in plants innate immunity. Recent studies in Arabidopsis have provided important details on plant innate immunity. Plant membrane PRR mainly consist of receptor like kinases and receptor like proteins. They sense PAMPs such as chitin from fungal cell wall, sulfated peptides, flagellin elongation factors etc. In addition to PAMPs, PRRs also recognize DAMP molecules that present in the intracellular space response to damage caused by pathogens, e.g.cell wall fragments, cytoplasmic proteins.

AtPEP 1, a 23-amino acids precursor peptide encoded by c-terminal of PROPEP 1 gene, is considered to be a DAMP associated molecule in Arabidopsis. Later, study using alanine scanning analysis showed that AtPEP 1 was derived by deletion of N-terminal of precursor protein, PROPEP 1. AtPEPs are functionally similar to systemin, an 18 residues peptide which plays critical role in defense signal and induced in response to wounding, jasmonate and ethylene. PEPR 1 is a receptor kinase with extra cellular leucine rich repeat motif and functions as a receptor for AtPEPs. In addition, Arabidopsis genome encode a close homologue named PEPR 2. But PEPR 1 and PEPR 2 have different preferences for AtPEPs.

AtPEP 1 interaction with PEPR 1 activates the defense genes that regulates jasmonate/ethylene and salicylate defense hormones and induce the expression of PDF1.2 (defensin) gene being component of plant innate immune system. Expression of these defense genes would result in more production of PROPEP 1 gene through feedback mechanism. This amplify the danger signals during pathogen infection and confers resistance against pathogens.

Moreover, PEPR 1 specifically interacts with receptor like cytoplasmic kinase, Botrylic- Induced Kianse 1 (BIK 1) to mediate PEP1 induce defense. C-terminus of PEPR 1 kinase domain showed a strong interaction with BIK 1 and phosphorylates BIK 1 on serine 236 and threonine 237 residues. Thus, BIK 1 phosphorylation by PEPRs is important for amplifying ethylene induce signaling, which is known to play an important role in plant innate immune system. Further, ethylene can enhance DAMP triggered immunity. Later, it was found that AtPEPs also help to transmit danger signals to the cell interior by activating the cell membrane Ca^{2+} channels to elevate innate immune defense. This activity is dependent on AtPEPR 1 and cyclic nucleotide gated channel 2 (CNGC2) . Activation of CNGC2 occurs through cGMP when produced by the AtPEPR 1 guanyl cyclic domain AtPEP 1 binding. Thus, cytosol Ca ^{2+} elevation cause expression of pathogen PDF1.2 gene and basal defense in plants.

== Structure ==
First crystal structure of the LRR domain of PEPR 1 with AtPEP1 (1 -23 residues) was solved by Jiao Tang in 2015. This help to reveal the molecular mechanism of AtPEP 1 recognition by PEPR 1. PEPR 1 receptors are receptor kinases with extracellular LRR motifs. AtPEP1 interacts with the inner side of the PEPR 1 LRR helical structure. PEPR 1 contains 27 canonical LRRs and AtPEP1 interacts LRR 4 to LRR 18. Many amino acids are highly conserved among these LRRs and AtPEP 1 only interacts with 3rd, 5th, 7th and 8th position of each LRR motif.

The C- terminal residues of AtPEP 1 shows strong interaction with PEPR 1 LRR than N-terminal. However, N- terminal segment of AtPEP1 also important in DAMP signals and both N and C terminal of AtPEP 1 act cooperatively in signaling. Moreover, it was found that AtPEP 1 interacting residues in PEPR 1 are also highly conserved in PEPR2 . However, PEPR2 does not contain the residues that interact with N-terminal of AtPEP1. Consequently, PEPR 1 has high affinity to AtPEP1.
