= Plant peptide hormone =

Peptide signaling plays a significant role in various aspects of plant growth and development and specific receptors for various peptides have been identified as being membrane-localized receptor kinases, the largest family of receptor-like molecules in plants. Signaling peptides include members of the following protein families.

- Systemin — is a small polypeptide functioning as a long-distance signal to activate chemical defenses against herbivores. It was the first plant hormone proven to be a peptide. Systemin induces the production of protein defense compound called protease inhibitors. Systemin was first identified in tomato leaves. It was found to be an 18-amino acid peptide processed from the C-terminus of a 200-amino acid precursor, which is called prosystemin.
- CLV3/ESR-related ('CLE') peptide family — CLV3 encodes a small secreted peptide that functions as a short range ligand to the membrane-bound CLV1 receptor like kinase that together with CLV2 (a receptor-like protein) function to maintain stem cell homeostasis in Arabidopsis shoot apical meristems. Although the maize embryo-surrounding region protein (ESR). and CLV3 are very different, they are both members of the CLE peptide family given that they share a short conserved 14-amino acid sequence at the carboxy terminal region. To date, more than 150 CLE signaling peptides are identified. This proteolytically processed bioactive region is important for both promoting and inhibiting cellular differentiation in both apical and cambial meristems. Recently it was found that CLE25 can act as a long distance signal to communicate water stress from the roots to leaves.
- ENOD40 — is an early nodulin gene, hence ENOD, that putatively encodes two small peptides, one of 12 and the other of 18 amino acid residues. Controversy exists on whether the mRNA or peptides themselves are responsible for bioactivity. Both peptides have been shown "in vivo" to bind to the 93 kDa subunit of sucrose synthase, an essential component in sucrose metabolism. Sucrose degradation is a key step in nitrogen fixation, and is a pre-requisite for normal nodule development.
- Phytosulfokine (PSK) — was first identified as a "conditioning factor" in asparagus and carrot cell cultures. The bioactive five amino acid peptide (PSK) is proteolytically processed from an ~80 amino acid precursor secreted peptide. PSK has been demonstrated to promote cellular proliferation and transdifferentiation. It has been demonstrated that PSK binds to a membrane bound LRR receptor like kinase (PSKR).
- POLARIS (PLS) — The PLS peptide has a predicted length of 36 amino acids however possesses no secretion signal, suggesting that it functions within the cytoplasm. The PLS peptide itself has not yet been biochemically isolated, however loss-of-function mutants are hypersensitive to cytokinin with reduced responsiveness to auxin. Developmentally it is involved in vascularization, longitudinal cell expansion and increased radial expansion.
- Rapid Alkalinization Factor (RALF) — is 49 amino acid peptide that was identified whilst purifying systemin from tobacco leaves, it causes rapid medium alkanalization and does not activate defence responses like systemin. Tomato RALF precursor cDNA encodes a 115 amino acid polypeptide containing an amino-terminal signal sequence with the bioactive RALF peptide encoded at the carboxy terminus. It is not known how mature RALF peptide is produced from its precursor, but a dibasic amino acid motif (typical of recognition sites of processing enzymes in yeast and animals) is located two residues upstream from the amino terminus of mature RALF. RALF has been identified to bind to potential membrane bound receptors complex containing proteins 25 kDa and 120 kDa in size.
- SCR/SP11 — are small polymorphic peptides produced by the tapetal cells of anthers and is involved in self-incompatibility of Brassica species. This secreted polypeptide is between 78 and 80 amino acid residues in length. Unlike other peptide hormones, no further post-translational processing occurs, except for the removal of the N-terminal signal peptide. SCR/SP11 like other small peptide hormones binds to a membrane bound LRR receptor like kinase (SRK).
- ROTUNDIFOLIA4/DEVIL1 (ROT4/DVL1) — The ROT4 and DVL1 are peptides of 53 and 51 amino acids respectively, which have a high degree of sequence homology. They are two members of 23 member peptide family. ROT4 and DVL1 are involved in regulating polar cell proliferation on the longitudinal axis of organs.
- Inflorescence deficient in abscission (IDA) — a family of secreted peptides identified to be involved in petal abscission. The peptides are 77 amino acids in length and possess an amino-terminal secretions signal. Like the CLE peptide family these proteins have a conserved carboxy-terminal domain that is bordered by potentially cleavable basic residues. These proteins are secreted from cells in the floral abscission zone. Studies suggest that the HAESA membrane-associated LRR-RLK is likely to be this peptide's receptor as it too is expressed in the zone of floral organ abscission.

== See also ==
- Plant hormones
- Florigen
