= 3-Epi-6-deoxocathasterone 23-monooxygenase =

Class of enzymes

Identifiers
- EC no.: 1.14.14.147

Databases
- IntEnz: IntEnz view
- BRENDA: BRENDA entry
- ExPASy: NiceZyme view
- KEGG: KEGG entry
- MetaCyc: metabolic pathway
- PRIAM: profile
- PDB structures: RCSB PDB PDBe PDBsum
Search
- PMC: articles
- PubMed: articles
- NCBI: proteins

3-Epi-6-deoxocathasterone 23-monooxygenase (EC 1.14.14.147, cytochrome P450 90C1, CYP90D1, CYP90C1) is an enzyme with systematic name 3-epi-6-deoxocathasterone,NADPH:oxygen oxidoreductase (C-23-hydroxylating). This enzyme catalyses the following chemical reaction

3-epi-6-deoxocathasterone
O_{2}
H_{2}O
6-deoxotyphasterol

3-dehydro-6-deoxoteasterone

The enzyme can insert a hydroxy group into other similar compounds, for example to give 3-dehydro-6-deoxoteasterone. It is a cytochrome P450 protein containing heme, isolated from Arabidopsis thaliana, and requires a partner cytochrome P450 reductase for functional expression. This uses nicotinamide adenine dinucleotide phosphate. 3-Epi-6-deoxocathasterone 23-monooxygenase takes part in brassinosteroid biosynthesis.
