= Brassinosteroid =

Class of plant hormones

Brassinolide, the first brassinosteroid isolated and shown to have biological activity

Brassinosteroids (BRs or less commonly BS) are a class of polyhydroxysteroids that have been recognized as a sixth class of plant hormones and may have utility as anticancer drugs for treating endocrine-responsive cancers by inducing apoptosis of cancer cells and inhibiting cancerous growth. These brassinosteroids were first explored during the 1970s when Mitchell et al. reported promotion in stem elongation and cell division by the treatment of organic extracts of rapeseed (Brassica napus) pollen. Brassinolide was the first brassinosteroid to be isolated in 1979, when pollen from Brassica napus was shown to promote stem elongation and cell divisions, and the biologically active molecule was isolated. The yield of brassinosteroids from 230 kg of Brassica napus pollen was only 10 mg. Since their discovery, over 70 BR compounds have been isolated from plants.

== Biosynthesis ==
The BR is biosynthesised from campesterol. The biosynthetic pathway was elucidated by Japanese researchers and later shown to be correct through the analysis of BR biosynthesis mutants in Arabidopsis thaliana, tomatoes, and peas. The sites for BR synthesis in plants have not been experimentally demonstrated. One well-supported hypothesis is that all tissues produce BRs, since BR biosynthetic and signal transduction genes are expressed in a wide range of plant organs, and short distance activity of the hormones also supports this. Experiments have shown that long distance transport is possible and that the flow is from the base to the tips (acropetal), but it is not known if this movement is biologically relevant.

== Functions ==
BRs have been shown to be involved in numerous plant processes:

- Promotion of cell expansion and cell elongation; work with auxins to do so.
- Regulating different aspects of root development including root meristem size, and lateral root initiation and development.
- It has an unclear role in cell division and cell wall regeneration.
- Promotion of vascular differentiation; BR signal transduction has been studied during vascular differentiation.
- Is necessary for pollen elongation for pollen tube formation.
- Acceleration of senescence in dying tissue cultured cells; delayed senescence in BR mutants supports that this action may be biologically relevant.
- Can provide some protection to plants during chilling and drought stress.
- Promoting activity of reactive oxygen species (ROS) detoxifying enzymes such as superoxide dismutase (SOD) and catalase (CAT). These antioxidants reduce oxidative damage caused by ROS, which is essential for oxidative stress management in plants.

Extract from the plant Lychnis viscaria contains a relatively high amount of Brassinosteroids. Lychnis viscaria increases the disease resistance of surrounding plants.

24-Epibrassinolide (EBL), a brassinosteroid isolated from Aegle marmelos Correa (Rutaceae), was further evaluated for the antigenotoxicity against maleic hydrazide (MH)-induced genotoxicity in Allium cepa chromosomal aberration assay. It was shown that the percentage of chromosomal aberrations induced by maleic hydrazide (0.01%) declined significantly with 24-epibrassinolide treatment.

BRs have been reported to counteract both abiotic and biotic stress in plants. Application of brassinosteroids to cucumbers was demonstrated to increase the metabolism and removal of pesticides, which could be beneficial for reducing the human ingestion of residual pesticides from non-organically grown vegetables.

BRs have also been reported to have a variety of effects when applied to rice seeds (Oryza sativa L.). Seeds treated with BRs were shown to reduce the growth inhibitory effect of salt stress. When the developed plants fresh weight was analyzed the treated seeds outperformed plants grown on saline and non-saline medium however when the dry weight was analyzed BR treated seeds only outperformed untreated plants that were grown on saline medium. When dealing with tomatoes (Lycopersicon esculentum) under salt stress the concentration of chlorophyll a and chlorophyll b were decreased and thus pigmentation was decreased as well. BR treated rice seeds considerably restored the pigment level in plants that were grown on saline medium when compared to non-treated plants under the same conditions.

== Signalling mechanism ==
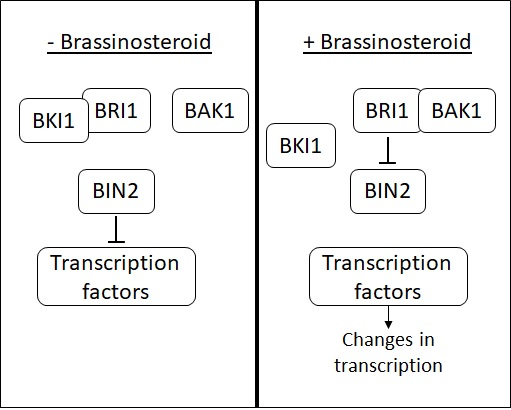
Brassinosteroid signal cascade: in the absence of BR, BKI1 blocks BRI1 activity and BIN2 inhibits transcription factors. When BR is present, BKI1 dissociates from BRI1 and the BRI1:BAK1 complex is formed. This complex promotes the inactivation of BIN2 and transcription factors can then exert their effects.

BRs are perceived at the cell membrane by a co-receptor complex, comprising brassinosteroid insensitive-1 (BRI1) and BRI1-associated receptor kinase 1 (BAK1). BRI1 acts as a kinase, but in the absence of BR its action is inhibited by another protein, BRI1 kinase inhibitor 1 (BKI1). When BR binds to the BRI1:BAK1 complex, BKI1 is released, and a phosphorylation cascade is triggered which results in the de-activation of another kinase, brassinosteroid insensitive 2 (BIN2). BIN2 and its close homologues inhibit several transcription factors. The inhibition of BIN2 by BR releases these transcription factors to bind to DNA and to enact certain developmental pathways.

== Agricultural uses ==
BR might reveal to have a prominent interest in the role of horticultural crops. Based on extensive research BR has the ability to improve the quantity and quality of horticultural crops and protect plants against many stresses that can be present in the local environment. With the many advances in technology dealing with the synthesis of more stable synthetic analogues and the genetic manipulation of cellular BR activity, using BR in the production of horticultural crops has become a more practical and hopeful strategy for improving crop yields and success. The application of BR successfully alleviate drought stress and improve wheat growth under deficit irrigation system. It had further positive impacts on increasing plant growth parameters via their integral role in decreasing oxidative stress indicators.

BR application has demonstrated efficacy against Phytophthora infestans, mildew on cucumber, viral diseases, and various others.

BR could also help bridge the gap of the consumers' health concerns and the producers need for growth. A major benefit of using BR is that it does not interfere with the environment because they act in a natural way. Since it is a “plant strengthening substance” and it is natural, BR application would be more favorable than pesticides and does not contribute to the co-evolution of pests.

In Germany, extract from the plant is allowed for use as a "plant strengthening substance." There are some bioassays that can detect BRs in the plant such as the bean second internode elongation assay and the rice leaf lamina inclination test.
