= BRI1-associated receptor kinase 1 =

Botanical messenger protein

Brassinosteroid insensitive 1-associated receptor kinase 1

Identifiers
- Organism: A. thaliana (thale cress)
- Symbol: BAK1
- Entrez: 829480
- RefSeq (mRNA): NM_119497.4
- RefSeq (Prot): NP_567920.1
- UniProt: Q94F62

Other data
- EC number: 2.7.1.37
- Chromosome: 4: 16.09 - 16.09 Mb
Search for
- Structures: Swiss-model
- Domains: InterPro

BRI1-associated receptor kinase 1 (BAK1- also known as somatic embryogenesis receptor kinase 3 or SERK3) is an important plant protein that has diverse functions in plant development.

== Structure ==
BAK1 belongs to a large group of plant proteins known as the Leucine-rich repeat receptor kinases (LRR-RKs). In the model plant species Arabidopsis thaliana, BAK1 and 4 other closely related proteins form a sub-group within the LRR-RK family, known as the somatic embryogenesis receptor kinases (SERKs). All 5 SERKs are transmembrane proteins. They consist of an extracellular domain, a single transmembrane pass and an intracellular domain. The extracellular domain is composed of several leucine rich repeats, and the intracellular domain functions as a protein kinase. BAK1 is thought to interact with many other LRR-RKs and the signalling output of BAK1 is dependent on its binding partner

== Roles in plant development ==
=== Brassinosteroid signalling ===
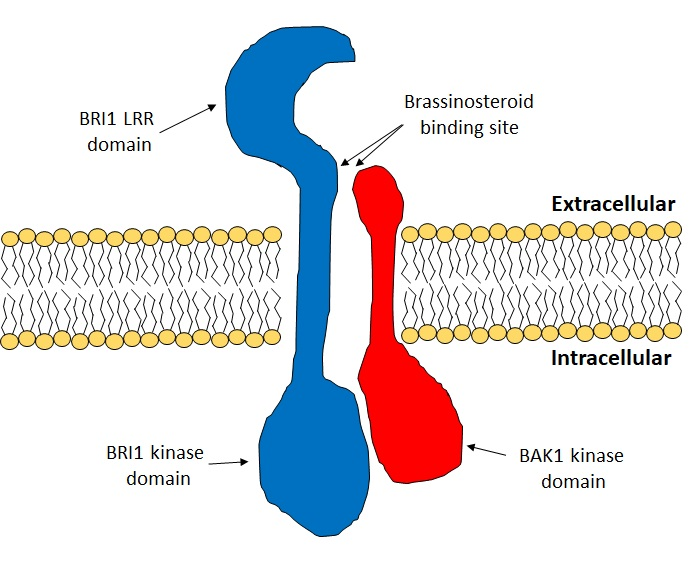
Diagram of BAK1 in complex with BRI1 during brassinosteroid signalling

BAK1 was initially identified for its role in brassinosteroid signalling. Brassinosteroid is a major plant hormone that has many roles and is often associated with cell elongation. BAK1 binds to the brassinosteroid receptor BRASSINOSTEROID INSENSITIVE 1 (BRI1) and this then triggers a phosphorylation cascade that leads to a change in expression of multiple genes.

=== Defense signalling ===
BAK1 is also critical for plant immunity and plants the lack BAK1 show a much greater susceptibility to bacterial infections. Plants are able to perceive bacteria by recognizing specific molecular signatures or 'effectors'. One of these signatures is bacterial-derived flagellin. Plants perceive flagellin when it binds to the receptor FLS2. When flagellin is perceived by FLS2, this strongly promotes the interaction between FLS2 and BAK1 and this then leads to changes in gene expression that promote defense against bacteria.

In addition to flagellin, plants are also able to perceive other bacterial effectors. One of these, EF-Tu is perceived by the EF-Tu receptor (EFR). Similar to FLS2, BAK1 is required for EFR function.

The LRR-RK Erecta (ER) may also promote plant defense, in concert with BAK1.

=== Regulation of stomatal development ===
Along with its role in plant defense, the ER:BAK1 complex also repress the development of stomata in leaves. Mutations in BAK1 and ER lead in increase in the number of stomata.

== Molecular basis for diverse functional roles ==
The diverse functional roles of BAK1 are brought about through its binding to a large number of receptors. However, many of the molecular components downstream of these receptor:BAK1 complexes are shared between these signalling pathways (for example, BR Signalling Kinase 1 (BSK1) is a positive regulator of both BRI1:BAK1 signalling and FLS2:BAK1 signalling). It is currently unclear how cells are able to distinguish between a BSK1 which has been activated by BRI1 or FLS2. One recent study has shown that BRI1 and FLS2 localize to different 'nano-domains' on the cell membrane and so it is possible that this spatial separation accounts for the very different signal outputs.
