= PEPR1 and PEPR2 =

PEPR 1 and PEPR2 (Perception of the Arabidopsis Danger Signal Peptide 1 or 2) are homolog kinases that act as enzymes on other proteins. They attach a phosphate group to specific proteins, called phosphorylation. These reactions can cause the function of the phosphorylated proteins to change. Both PEPR 1 and PEPR 2 can be classified as receptor kinases, which serve an important role in immunity in plants. Receptor kinases have the ability to change the conformation of receptors by adding the phosphate group. These specific receptor kinases serve as a pattern recognition receptor, or PRR, that can quickly and efficiently recognize many different molecular patterns or signatures that are unique to each pathogen. They can also detect different danger signals released from the host and respond accordingly. More specifically, the proteins contain leucine-rich repeat segments that interact outside of the cell. This leucine-rich repeat is a structural motif present in some proteins that has specific functions due to its folded structure. This fold can contain many repeating amino acids, but the most common is the hydrophobic leucine, hence the name. PEPR1 and PEPR2 are present in plants and are involved in several immune system processes. Their ability to change the conformation of receptors can have an effect on signaling processes within plants, allowing the plant to have a system of immunity in place in case of an infection or pathogen.

== Discovery ==
The PEPR1 and PEPR2 kinases that bind to the receptors AtPEPR1 and AtPEPR2, respectively were identified. Through photolabeling with a radioactively marked ligand, an AtPep1 receptor was able to be purified and later duplicated. This led to the discovery of the first damage associated molecular pattern or DAMP/pattern recognition receptor couple in Arabidopsis, otherwise known as the thale cress, which is a small flowering plant common in Eurasia. This discovered receptor was coined PEPR1, PEP receptor 1. Further analysis of the Arabidopsis genome established a very genetically similar homologue of PEPR1, PEPR2, or PEP receptor 2. Leucine-rich repeat receptor like protein kinase is PEPR1 and PEPR2 in Arabidopsis thaliana.

== Research ==
PEPR 1 and PEPR2 have been studied by multiple researchers for their properties and functions in immune system processes. Many of these studies involve isolating and crystallizing the proteins and have been performed in the natural setting, in vivo, as well as in an artificial lab environment, in vitro. The proteins function as inhibitors that potentially help plants have immunity to different substances by working with other compounds in the plant. Pep1, a receptor in the plant, can be controlled by PEPR1 and PEPR2, along with other proteins and enzymes such as “botrytis-induced kinase 1 (BIK1) and PBS1-like 1 (PBL1)”. More specifically, when exposed to the Pep1 receptor, the proteins act as kinases when interacting with BIK1.

== Function ==
The receptor kinase properties of PEPR1 and PEPR2 allow them to perform important duties within plants. Plants have complex and detailed signaling systems, and receptor kinases ensure that these systems function properly. The receptor kinases recognize elements associated with pathogens that interact with the plant to ensure that the plant can protect itself from foreign, harmful substances. Using these properties, receptor kinases are very important in the immune system of a plant.

PEPR 1 and PEPR 2 are homologs, meaning they have similar properties and structures, yet they have distinguishing reactions when exposed to different compounds. For example, both kinases act as receptors of AtPeps. However, they respond to the compound differently. The kinases each preferentially interact with a different AtPep, giving them unique functions depending on their environments. According to research done on PEPR1 and PEPR2, their function is very important not only in immunity, but in important signaling pathways as well, such as the jasmonic acid-ethylene pathway and the salicylic acid pathways. These unique responses may make it possible for PEPR 1 and PEPR 2 to be a link between both "local and systemic immunity" systems.

== Structure ==
PEPR1 and PEPR2 share a unique structural component because they contain extracellular leucine-rich repeat motifs (LRR motifs). Studies have been conducted to discover the structure of PEPR1 or PEPR2, sometimes in complex with certain proteins and in specific environments. When complexed with AtPep1, it forms a crystalline structure in which the units contain two copies of PEPR1 and AtPep1 and are not symmetrical. In this complex, PEPR1 does not oligomerize as some other protein receptors would. The receptor kinase also contains a leucine rich repeat section that consists of 27 repeats.

== Occurrence ==
PEPR1s have been discovered in Arabidopsis, Solanum lycopersicum, and Zea mays. They are thought to respond to Pep1, 2, 3, 4, 5, and 6. For review and further experimental results into them see Lori et al 2015.

== Mutations ==
PEPR1 and PEPR2 have been shown to contain certain mutations that causes a change in or loss of function for the proteins. These mutations can create complications for the plant and its immune system when they occur. If PEPR1 and PEPR2 lose their sensitivity to proteins induced by damage to the plant, the plant cannot respond to heal itself.

=== Sensitivity to AtPep1 ===
Two mutants are currently associated with the Arabidopsis plant in relation to the PEPR1 and PEPR2 receptor kinases. These mutants have a mutation in their pepr1 and pepr2 genes which is affected in PEPR1 and its homologue PEPR2, respectively. These PEPR1 and PEPR2 receptor kinases are transcribed and further translated from the same chromosome. In order to create double mutant pepr1 and pepr2 offspring the two populations were crossed and screened for the AtPep1 insensitivity offspring. Both of those mutants and the wild type plants were found to have a sensitivity to AtPep1, a damage associated molecular pattern peptide. However, when both mutations occur a double mutant pepr1/pepr2 plant is completely insensitive to the AtPep1. These plants further fail to recognize AtPep2 and AtPep3, distinct homologues of AtPep1, which led Elzbieta Krol to the conclusion that the homologues PEPR1 and PEPR2 control their perception as well.

=== Sensitivity to ethylene ===
The same double mutation causes a decreased reaction to ethylene. In the plant, ethylene is a hormone produced when the plant is damaged. Ethylene also helps increase the response to damage caused to the plant. When PEPR1 and PEPR 2 bind to ethylene, they start the reaction to activate the immune system in the plant. However, when this mutation is present, the plant cannot properly respond to ethylene signals, decreasing its ability to heal itself.
