= EF-Tu receptor =

Pattern-recognition receptor (PRR)

LRR receptor-like serine/threonine-protein kinase EFR

Identifiers
- Organism: Arabidopsis thaliana
- Symbol: EFR
- UniProt: C0LGT6
Search for
- Structures: Swiss-model
- Domains: InterPro

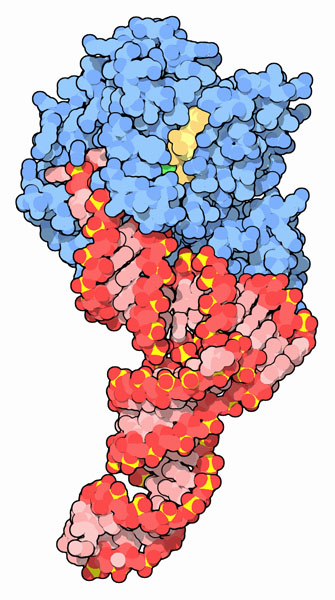
EF-Tu (blue) is the ligand of EFR

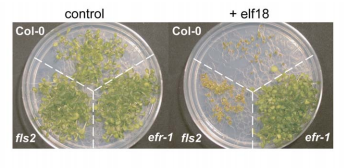
EFR enables an immune response to elf18, a sequence of EF-Tu

EF-Tu receptor, abbreviated as EFR, is a pattern-recognition receptor (PRR) that binds to the prokaryotic protein EF-Tu (elongation factor thermo unstable) in Arabidopsis thaliana (and other members of Brassicaceae). This receptor is an important part of the plant immune system as it allows the plant cells to recognize and bind to EF-Tu, preventing genetic transformation by and protein synthesis in pathogens such as Agrobacterium.

== Background ==
The plant Arabidopsis thaliana has a genome with only around 135 megabase pairs (Mbp), making it small enough to fully synthesize. It also makes it relatively easy to study, leading to its use as a common model organism in the field of plant genetics. One important use of A. thaliana is in the study of plant immunity. Plant pathogens are able to travel through a plant's vascular system, but plants do not have specific immune cells that can travel this way. Plants also do not have an adaptive immune system, so other forms of immunity are required. One is the use of pattern-recognition receptors (PRR) to bind to pathogen-associated molecular patterns (PAMP), which are highly conserved structures on the outside of many invasive organisms. This form of immunity acts on intercellular pathogens, which are ones outside of individual plant cells. PRRs are transmembrane proteins, which have an anchor inside the cell and portions that extend beyond the membrane. They are part of the innate immune system and bind to and prevent the proliferation of pathogens with the PAMPs that they can bind.

EF-Tu, a very common and highly conserved protein, is an example of a PAMP that can be found in numerous pathogens. Its function as an elongation factor means that it helps create new proteins during translation in the ribosome. When a protein is being formed, amino acids are connected in a long sequence, known as a protein's primary structure. Elongation factors help coordinate the movement of transfer RNAs (tRNA) and messenger RNAs (mRNA) so they stay aligned as the ribosome translocates along the mRNA chain. Due to its importance in ensuring the accuracy of translation and preventing mutations, EF-Tu is a good target of both immune systems and drug therapies designed to prevent infections and subsequent diseases.

== Biological function ==
=== Synthesis ===
EFR, like other proteins, undergoes translation in a cell's ribosomes. After the primary structure of the protein has been formed it must fold into its three dimensional tertiary structure to become functional. This occurs in the endoplasmic reticulum (ER). While in the ER, this primary polypeptide chain undergoes a regulatory process known as ER-quality control (ER-QC) to help ensure it folds into the correct 3-D structure. ER-QC process consists of a series of chaperone proteins that help guide the folding of the EFR polypeptide chains, preventing the aggregation of many polypeptide chains into one large group. Proteins that have not folded are kept in the ER until they have folded into their correct 3-D shape. If folding does not occur then the unfolded protein is eventually destroyed.

One of the control mechanisms of EFR is the protein Arabidopsis stromal-derived factor-2 (SDF2). A genetic variant of the A. thaliana plant that did not have the gene to encode for this protein had a far lower production of functional EFR proteins. SDF2 also cannot be substituted for other enzymes in EFR production. Experimental analysis indicated that EFR is destroyed in the cell when it is produced without SDF2, though the mechanism of this action is unknown. Other proteins that are required for the proper synthesis of EFR include Arabidopsis CRT3 and UGGT, which are members of the EFR-QC and act as chaperones to help folding.

=== Role in plant immunity ===
EFR receptors have a high affinity for the EF-Tu PAMP. This has been proven analytically through competitive binding assays and SDS-PAGE analysis. When EFR binds to EF-Tu, the basal resistance is activated. This response happens after an infection has already been established and it is important to the plant immune system because it prevents the spread of the pathogen throughout the plant. Only bacteria that have a high amount of EF-Tu are effectively inhibited by EFR, such as Agrobacterium tumefaciens.

=== Similarities to FLS2 ===
Like EFR, FLS2 (flagellin-sensing 2) is a plant receptor-like kinase that acts as a PRR in the plant innate immune system. Instead of binding to EF-Tu, it binds to flagellin, another highly conserved structure present on many pathogens. Flagellin, like EF-Tu, is a good target for the plant immune system since it is so widespread. It also triggers an immune response in a larger variety of plants than EF-Tu. The immune response triggered by FLS2 is very similar to the one that is triggered by EFR and the enzymes that are activated by both receptors likely come from a common pool that is found in many cells. This indicates that the two receptor pathways converge, which has been shown to occur at the ion channels in the plasma membrane. By perceiving multiple PAMPs, a plant is able to respond to a pathogenic infection more quickly and efficiently, as well as respond to a wider array of pathogens.

== Applications ==
EFR is found only in the plant family Brassicaceae, meaning it has a limited effect in nature. Experiments have demonstrated the ability to successfully transfer EFR to plants in other families, such as Nicotiana benthamiana, a relative of tobacco, and Solanum lycopersicum, the tomato plant. The ability to transfer PRRs between plants and have them retain their effectiveness broadens genetic engineering techniques to promote disease resistance in crops. It can also reduce chemical wastes associated with mass agriculture and enable the transfer of immunity rapidly and without traditional breeding.

== See also ==
- EF-Tu
- FLS2
- Flagellin
- Arabidopsis thaliana
