= Botrytis–induced kinase 1 =

Botrytis–induced kinase 1 (BIK1) is a membrane-anchored enzyme in plants. It is a kinase that provides resistance to necrotrophic and biotrophic pathogens. As its name suggests, BIK1 is only active after being induced by Botrytis infection. When Botrytis cinerea is present, the BIK1 gene is transcribed so that the kinase is present to defend the cell. BIK1 functions to regulate the amount of salicylic acid (SA) present in the cell. When Botrytis cinerea or Alternaria brassicicola or any other necrotrophic pathogen is present, BIK1 is transcribed to regulate the pathogen response mechanisms. When BIK1 is present, SA levels decrease, allowing the necrotrophic response to take place. When necrotrophic pathogens are not present, BIK1 is not transcribed and SA levels increase, limiting the necrotrophic resistance pathway. Only the pathogenic defense response that is initiated by BIK1 is dependent on SA levels. Non-pathogenic cellular functions occur independently. In terms of non-pathogenic cellular functions, BIK1 is described as a critical component of ET signaling and PAMP-triggered immunity to pathogens.

== Functions of BIK1 ==
For cellular processes that are not directly related to pathogen resistance or defense, BIK1 does not utilize traditional defense-mediating hormones such as SA, JA, or ACC, but instead utilizes an herbicide, known as paraquat which produces ROIs. It is believed that SA, JA, and ACC have no effect on BIK1 induction because they are likely located downstream from the BIK1 gene, or it is possible that BIK1 operates completely independently. However, it is believed that BIK1 does play a vital role in the ET signaling pathway. Based on the signaling function of BIK1 in ET responses, it is believed that Botrytis-induced kinase1 accumulates response signals that it receives from upstream regulators and then integrates them into its own resistance mechanism.

BIK1 is a receptor-like cytoplasmic kinase (RLCK) that associates with a cell-surface receptor, FLS2, and a co-receptor kinase, BAK1 to transduce signals when a PAMP is detected. In order for BIK1 to be activated, site-specific phosphorylation must occur.

== Effects of Phosphorylation on BIK1 Function ==
Because BIK1 is a possible regulator of the FLS2-BAK1 complex, it is speculated that in vitro, BAK1 phosphorylates BIK1, which then phosphorylates both FLS2 and BAK1. However, in vivo, BIK1 is not phosphorylated until about 5-10 minutes after the addition of FS2, and the peak phosphorylation occurs just after the phosphorylation of the FS2-BAK1 complex. It is speculated that BIK1 activation might be enhanced through transphosphorylation by BAK1 rather than by FLS2 because FLS2 more likely serves as a scaffold protein for the arrangement of the BAK1-FLS2 complex. This hypothesis will require more testing in vivo. Research has shown that BIK1 and BAK1 are signaling partners for the flagellin receptor FLS2 and that the three together initiate defense response. However, BIK1 and BAK1 phosphorylate different residues of the FLS2 receptor with the exception of only a select few. This suggests that both BAK1 and BIK1 play unique roles in defense response by a series of phosphorylation reactions with one another and the flagellin receptor FLS2.

== BIK1 effect on Plant Growth and Development ==
Root systems in plants with an expressed BIK1 gene and in plants with a loss-of-function mutant show that without an expressed BIK1 gene, roots grow more laterally, in greater numbers, and with shorter primary roots. With a functional BIK1 gene, roots grew downward into the soil and had less root hairs. Additionally, without a functional BIK1 gene, leaves showed serrated edges and considerable wrinkles whereas leaves with a functional BIK1 gene showed stronger, smoother leaves. Flowering plants that lack a functional BIK1 gene flower an average of six days before those with a functional BIK1 gene and show weaker stem strengths, reduced fertility, and smaller siliques. The BIK1 protein contributes to overall stronger stems, broader leaves, and a healthy flowering timeline. Plants lacking a BIK1 protein or that have a BIK1 protein whose functions are being inhibited may exhibit a shorter flowering period and a smaller stature for the plant overall. This suggests that BIK1 plays a significant role in a plant's ability to grow properly as well as its ability to maintain an adequate rigidity and stem strength that contribute to overall plant health.

== Research ==
Current research regarding Botrytis-induced kinase1 aims to determine how BIK1 interacts with MAPK pathway proteins as well as with the OXI1 kinase. Also, studies are being conducted to determine the relationship between BIK1 and the phosphorylizing homolog kinases PEPR1 and PEPR2. Though it is believed that PEPR1 and PEPR2 act as enzymes toward BIK1 and phosphorylate the kinase, research is still being done to examine the effects of the interaction on a broader scale. Previously published research suggests that PEPR1 and PEPR2 work with the ET signal pathway and Botrytis-induced kinase1 in order to amplify the defense mechanism in immune response. Additionally, future research may explore the mechanism that allows BIK1 and BAK1 to cooperate with the FLS2 receptor to initiate defense response. While it is known that the three work together and each is required for the process to occur efficiently, but the exact relationship between the three remains unknown and the specific binding residues for each component have yet to be determined in vivo.
