= Clarence A. Ryan =

American plant biochemist (1931–2007)

- Born: September 29, 1931
- Died: October 7, 2007 (aged 76)
- Other names: Bud Ryan
- Known for: Discovery of systemin
- Awards: Member, National Academy of Sciences (1986)
- Scientific career
- Fields: Plant biochemistry, Plant disease resistance
- Institutions: Washington State University

Clarence A. Ryan (1931 – 2007), often known as Bud Ryan, was an American plant biochemist whose research revealed key molecular mechanisms underlying plant defense responses to herbivory. He spent most of his career at Washington State University, where his laboratory discovered the peptide signaling molecule systemin, the first plant peptide hormone shown to activate systemic defense responses. His work helped establish the role of peptide signals in plant defense and plant–insect interactions.

Ryan was elected to the United States National Academy of Sciences in recognition of his contributions to plant biochemistry and signaling.

== Early life and education ==
Clarence A. Ryan was born in 1920 in the United States. He trained as a biochemist and developed a research career focused on plant physiology and plant–insect interactions. Ryan later joined the faculty at Washington State University, where he became a professor in the Institute of Biological Chemistry and conducted research on plant defense mechanisms.

== Scientific career ==
Ryan’s research focused on how plants respond to insect feeding and mechanical wounding. Earlier studies had shown that wounded plants accumulate defensive proteins, including proteinase inhibitors that interfere with digestive enzymes in herbivorous insects.

In 1991, Ryan and colleagues isolated an 18–amino acid peptide from tomato leaves that triggered the synthesis of wound-inducible proteinase inhibitor proteins. The peptide, named systemin, was shown to activate defense gene expression when applied to plants at very low concentrations.

Subsequent work demonstrated that systemin is produced from a larger precursor protein known as prosystemin. Ryan's group showed that antisense suppression of the gene strongly reduced systemic wound responses, confirming that systemin functions as a central signaling molecule in plant defense pathways.

The discovery of systemin demonstrated that plants use peptide signals to communicate damage information between tissues and activate defensive genes.

== Honors and recognition ==
Ryan received numerous honors for his contributions to plant biochemistry and plant defense signaling.

He was elected to the National Academy of Sciences in 1986 for his pioneering work on proteinase inhibitors and plant responses to herbivory. Earlier studies from his laboratory showed that wounding or insect feeding induces the accumulation of proteinase inhibitors in plants and that this response can spread systemically to unwounded tissues. Ryan's later discovery of the peptide signaling molecule systemin in 1991 provided a molecular explanation for this systemic wound signaling pathway and became one of the most influential findings of his career.

Ryan received the Stephen Hales Prize from the American Society of Plant Physiologists in 1992 in recognition of his research on plant defense mechanisms.

In 2007 he was named a member of the inaugural class of ASPB Fellows.
