= 24-Epibrassinolide =

Names
- IUPAC name (22R,23R)-2α,3α,22,23-Tetrahydroxy-6,7-epoxy-6,7-seco-5α-ergostan-6-one
- Systematic IUPAC name (1R,3aS,3bS,6aS,8S,9R,10aR,10bS,12aS)-1-[(2S,3R,4R,5R)-3,4-Dihydroxy-5,6-dimethylheptan-2-yl]-8,9-dihydroxy-10a,12a-dimethylhexadecahydro-6H-indeno[4,5-d][2]benzoxepin-6-one

Identifiers
CAS Number	78821-43-9
3D model (JSmol)	Interactive image
ChEBI	CHEBI:27722
ChEMBL	ChEMBL563853
ChemSpider	391354
ECHA InfoCard	100.167.027
KEGG	C11049
PubChem CID	443055
UNII	49CN25465Y
CompTox Dashboard (EPA)	DTXSID10705357
- InChI: InChI=1S/C28H48O6/c1-14(2)15(3)24(31)25(32)16(4)18-7-8-19-17-13-34-26(33)21-11-22(29)23(30)12-28(21,6)20(17)9-10-27(18,19)5/h14-25,29-32H,7-13H2,1-6H3/t15-,16+,17+,18-,19+,20+,21-,22+,23-,24-,25-,27-,28-/m1/s1 Key: IXVMHGVQKLDRKH-QHBHMFGVSA-N
- SMILES: C[C@@H]([C@H]1CC[C@@H]2[C@@]1(CC[C@H]3[C@H]2COC(=O)[C@@H]4[C@@]3(C[C@H]([C@H](C4)O)O)C)C)[C@H]([C@@H]([C@H](C)C(C)C)O)O

Properties
Chemical formula	C_{28}H_{48}O_{6}
Molar mass	480.686 g·mol^{−1}
Appearance	White powder
Melting point	274 °C (525 °F; 547 K)

Hazards
- GHS labelling
Pictograms	(GHS07: Exclamation mark)
Signal word	Warning
Hazard statements	H315, H319, H335
Precautionary statements	P261, P264, P271, P280, P302+P352, P304+P340, P305+P351+P338, P312, P321, P332+P313, P337+P313, P362, P403+P233, P405, P501
- Except where otherwise noted, data are given for materials in their standard state (at 25 °C [77 °F], 100 kPa). Infobox references

24-Epibrassinolide is a type of brassinosteroid, a natural occurring plant hormone. It was first discovered 1979 as a growth promoting substance in rape pollen, and was subsequently discovered in many other plant organs. 24-Epibrassinolide is essential for proper plant development growth and development, is involved in the regulation of cell elongation and division, and has been shown to improve plant functions in salt- and nickel-stressed environments, as well as increasing enzyme activity. It is sold commercially as a white powder for use in plant culture.
