= Phytosulfokine =

Phytosulfokines are plant hormones that belong to the growing class of plant peptide hormones. Phytosulfokines are sulfated growth factors strongly promoting proliferation of plant cells in cultures.
