= Maleic hydrazide =

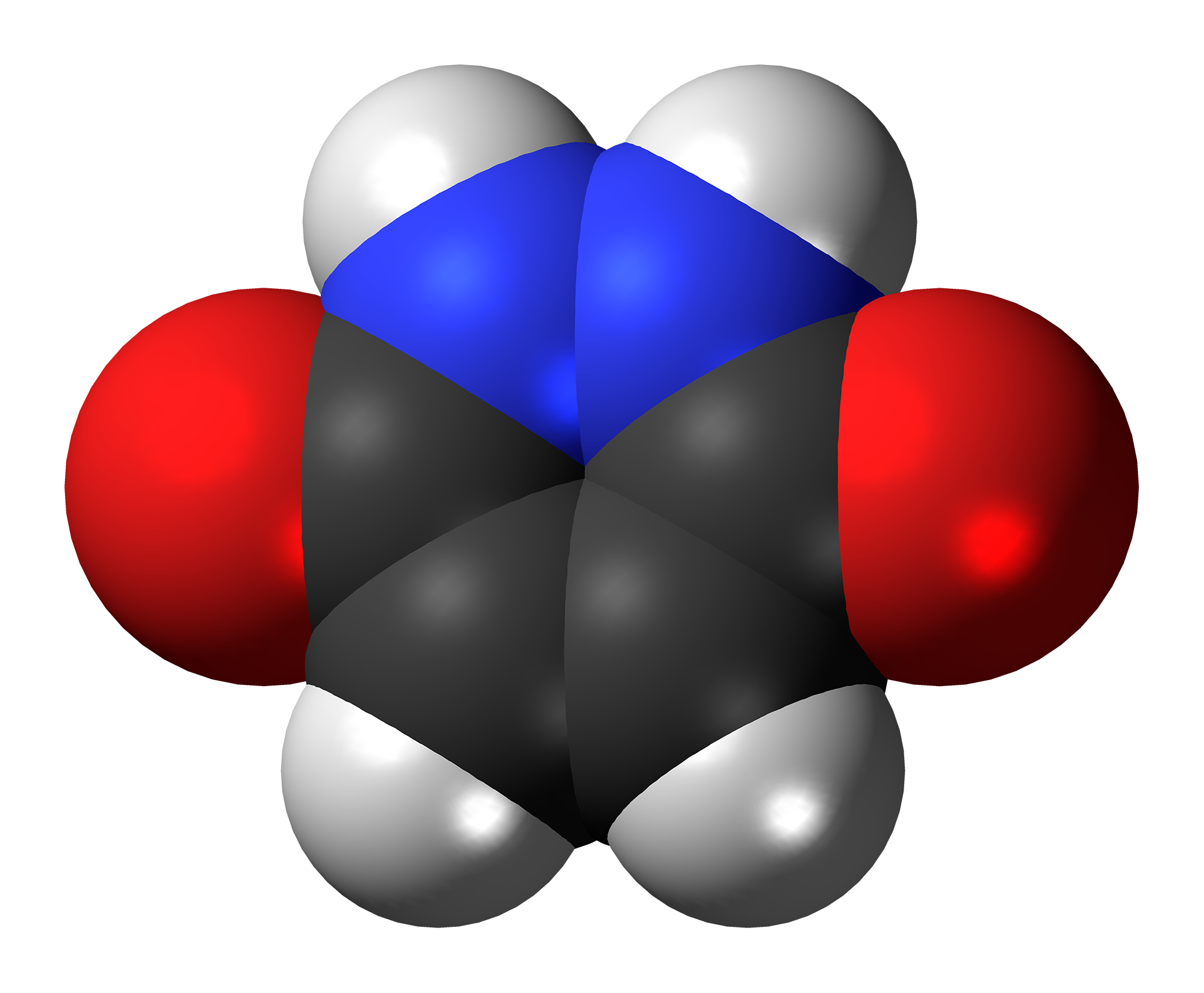

Names
- IUPAC name 1,2-dihydropyridazine-3,6-dione

Identifiers
| CAS Number | 123-33-1 |
| 3D model (JSmol) | Interactive image |
| ChEBI | CHEBI:81771 |
| ChEMBL | ChEMBL1489913 |
| ChemSpider | 20632 |
| ECHA InfoCard | 100.004.201 |
| EC Number | 204-619-9 |
| KEGG | C18474 |
| PubChem CID | 21954 |
| RTECS number | UR5950000 |
| UNII | TQ7L3FCV66 |
| UN number | 3082 3077 |
| CompTox Dashboard (EPA) | DTXSID9020792 |
- InChI: InChI=1S/C4H4N2O2/c7-3-1-2-4(8)6-5-3/h1-2H,(H,5,7)(H,6,8) Key: BGRDGMRNKXEXQD-UHFFFAOYSA-N
- SMILES: C1=CC(=O)NNC1=O

Properties
| Chemical formula | C_{4}H_{4}N_{2}O_{2} |
| Molar mass | 112.088 g·mol^{−1} |
| Density | 1.6 g/cm^{3} |
| Melting point | 296–298 °C (decomposes) |

Hazards
- GHS labelling
| Pictograms | (GHS07: Exclamation mark) (GHS08: Health hazard) |
| Signal word | Warning |
| Hazard statements | H315, H319, H335, H341 |
| Precautionary statements | P201, P202, P261, P264, P271, P280, P281, P302+P352, P304+P340, P305+P351+P338, P308+P313, P312, P321, P332+P313, P337+P313, P362, P403+P233, P405, P501 |
- Except where otherwise noted, data are given for materials in their standard state (at 25 °C [77 °F], 100 kPa). Infobox references

Maleic hydrazide, often known by the brand name Fazor, is a plant growth regulator that reduces growth through preventing cell division but not cell enlargement. It is applied to the foliage of potato, onion, garlic and carrot crops to prevent sprouting during storage. It can also be used to control volunteer potatoes that are left in the field during harvesting. It was first identified in the 1940s but was not used commercially in the United Kingdom until 1984. The banning of chlorpropham as a sprout suppressant in 2019 has led renewed interest in how maleic hydrazide can be used in potatoes.
