= Brassinosteroid insensitive-1 =

Plant hormone receptor

Brassinosteroid insensitive 1

Identifiers
- Organism: Arabidopsis thaliana
- Symbol: BRI1
- Entrez: 830095
- HomoloGene: 91895
- RefSeq (mRNA): NM_120100.3
- RefSeq (Prot): NP_195650.1
- UniProt: O22476

Other data
- EC number: 2.7.11.1
- Chromosome: 4: 18.32 - 18.33 Mb
Search for
- Structures: Swiss-model
- Domains: InterPro

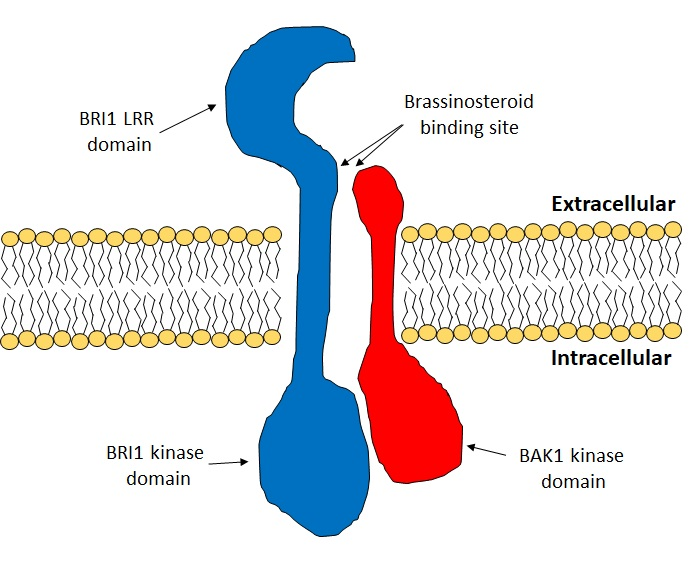
Representation of the BRI1-BAK1 co-receptor complex

Brassinosteroid insensitive 1 (BRI1) is the major receptor of the plant hormone brassinosteroid. It plays very important roles in plant development, especially in the control of cell elongation and for the tolerance of environmental stresses. BRI1 enhances cell elongation, promotes pollen development, controls vasculature development and promotes chilling and freezing tolerance. BRI1 is one of the most well studied hormone receptors and it acts a model for the study of membrane-bound receptors in plants.

== Structure ==
BRI1 is an integral membrane protein. On the extracellular side of the membrane lies a series of 25 leucine-rich repeats (LRRs). The LRR domain forms a horseshoe shape. An atypical LRR within this domain acts as the brassinosteroid binding site. Next to the LRR domain there is a single-pass transmembrane section. The intracellular domain of BRI1 functions as a kinase and it is this domain triggers the phosphorylation cascade that results in changes of gene expression.

== Activation ==
In the absence of brassinosteroid, BRI1 is held in an inactive state by another protein, BRI1 kinase inhibitor 1 (BKI1). When brassinosteroid binds to BRI1, it reduces the stability of the BRI1:BKI1 complex and promotes the binding of BRI1 to another membrane protein, BRI1-associated receptor kinase 1 (BAK1). In the BRI1:BAK1 complex, both BRI1 and BAK1 make contact with the brassinosteroid molecule and for this reason they are considered a co-receptor. BRI1 and BAK1 sequentially phosphorylate each other in their kinase domains, which results in the activation of BRI1. The activated kinase domain of BRI1 phosphorylates several receptor-like cytoplasmic kinases (RLCKs), notably the brassinosteroid signalling kinase (BSK) and constituitive differential growth 1 (CDG1) families. The RLCKs transduce this signal to downstream components, which ultimately results in the activation or de-activation of several transcription factors.

== Related proteins ==
=== BRI1-family proteins ===
In the model plant species Arabidopsis thaliana, BRI1 acts alongside two homologous proteins, known as BRI1-LIKE1 (BRL1) and BRL3. The function of BRL1 and BRL3 appears to be restricted to the development of the vasculature system, but even in this context, BRI1 plays a more dominant role. Both BRL1 and BRL3 are able to bind brassinosteroids and act as receptors. A fourth BRI1-family protein, BRL2 cannot bind brassinosteroid and its function is unknown.

=== FLS2 ===
BRI1 belongs to the large leucine-rich receptor-like protein kinase family. There are many other members of this family of proteins, and one of the most important is FLS2. FLS2 acts as a detector of the bacterial protein flagellin and is important for plant immunity. Surprisingly (given their different functions) the signal cascades of BRI1 and FLS2 share many of the same components. Recently it was suggested that BRI1 and FLS2 localize to different 'nano-domains' on the cell membrane and it is this spatial separation that accounts for their very different signal outputs.
