= FLS2 =

Type of gene involved in flagellin reception of bacteria

LRR receptor-like serine/threonine-protein kinase FLS2
- Crystal structure of the extracellular domains of FLS2 and BAK1 from Arabidopsis thaliana, in complex with the bacterial flagellin epitope flg22 (PDB: 4MN8)

Identifiers
- Organism: Arabidopsis thaliana
- Symbol: FLS2
- UniProt: Q9FL28
Search for
- Structures: Swiss-model
- Domains: InterPro

FLS genes have been discovered to be involved in the flagellin reception of bacteria. FLS1 was the original gene discovered shown to correspond with a specific ecotype within Arabidopsis thaliana. Even so, further studies have shown a second FLS gene known as FLS2, which is also associated with flagellin reception. FLS2 and FLS1 are different genes with different responsibilities, but are related genetically. FLS2 has a specific focus in plant defense and is involved in promoting the MAP kinase cascade. Mutations in the FLS2 gene can cause bacterial infection by lack of response to the 22-amino acid peptide flg22. Therefore, FLS2's primary focus is association with flg22 while its secondary focus is the involvement of promoting the MAP kinase cascade in plant defense.

== FLS2 and its similarities to receptor-like kinases ==
FLS2 is considered a receptor-like kinase (RLK). RLKs are essentially tyrosine kinases fused to an N-terminal leucine-rich repeat domain, which controls its function. Although tyrosine kinases are widespread and present in mammals, this type of fusion is only found in plants. RLKs are transmembrane proteins that consists of inner, outer, and central membrane regions. RLKs play an important role in plant reception, which will be shown through FLS2. Brassinosteroid insensitive-1 (BRI1) is another important RLK with similarities to FLS2. Despite sharing many of the same signalling components, FLS2 and BRI1 have very different effects on the cell.

== Natural variation in flagellin perception ==
FLS2 is conserved across land plants, but bacterial flg22 epitopes are polymorphic, and some pathogens carry variants that evade canonical FLS2 recognition. A few naturally occurring FLS2 homologues have "expanded" perception ranges that let them detect these otherwise-evasive bacterial flagellin variants. Researchers have identified the specific structural pockets and amino acid residues responsible for the expanded flg22 recognition and successfully transferred them between related FLS2 receptors, engineering a narrow-range receptor into one that can detect additional pathogens. Evolutionary analyses found these regions are under similar positive selection across multiple plant orders, suggesting the expanded perception may be common in nature and that rational engineering could help broaden pathogen detection in crops.

== Structure ==
FLS2 consists of 3 domains: an extracellular, a transmembrane, and an intracellular. The extracellular domain is known as the Leucine-rich repeat (LRR) domain. It is in this region, which is the amino-terminus, where it is said to have direct interaction with flagellin on the inner concave surface of the LRR helix, initiating the response of FLS2 to flg22. The transmembrane domain is where proteins transition from extracellular to intracellular. This region is usually very thermodynamically stable and occurs only in the phospholipid membrane between cells. The intracellular domain is the serine/threonine kinase domain. In this domain, phosphorylation catalyzes a protein kinase cascade leading to a response. In FLS2, this response elicits changes in growth and plant defenses.

== Ectopic expression ==
One experiment performed to show involvement of FLS2 in flagellin perception was an ectopic expression of FLS2 using the CaMV 35S gene promoter in one wild type Arabidopsis thaliana plant and two supposedly mutant Arabidopsis thaliana plants. The wild type Arabidopsis plant was indicated by Col-0 and the two mutants were indicated by 35S::FLS2-col2 and 35S::FLS2-col4. In this experiment, callose deposition and production of active oxygen species were the variables considered to show flagellin perception after treatment of flg22, as indicated by previous research (Gomez-Gomez, et al. 1999). Results for this study showed: firstly, a response in callose deposition 12 hours after treatment in only one plant type, which was the mutant 35S::FLS2-col2; secondly, in the wild type and mutant 35S::FLS2-col4, no callose deposition was detected in plants that exhibited reduced levels of FLS2. In direct correlation with the callose deposition response, a luminol-based assay showed oxidative burst in leaf tissues of the three plants types. The luminol-based assay also showed a rapid and strong oxidative response in mutant 35S::FLS2-col2 with treatment of 10nM flg22, whereas a 10nM treatment of flg22 in the mutant 35S::FLS2-col4 was unable to induce any oxidative response that would occur naturally in the wild type Arabidopsis plant. Even so, higher treatment levels of flg22 would elicit an oxidative response but not significantly compared to the wild type. The last thing observed in this experiment was treatment of flg22 in regards to growth inhibition to T2 seedlings. Growth inhibition in 35S::FLS2-col2 was greater than the wild type under flg22 treatment, whereas 35S::FLS2-col4 showed a reduced growth inhibition compared to wild type plants under flg22 treatment, which is the inverse of the oxidative response in these two mutants relative to the wild type.

== Involvement in defense responses ==
In the same way that mammals and insects have an innate immunity response to pathogens, plants have a defense system that is similar yet modified. The biggest difference between plants, mammals, and insects is that mammals and insects are not stationary like plants, therefore a plant's defense system is more complex and more reliant on signaling pathways to notify the plant of what could be potentially attacking. With that in mind, it is important that all gram-positive and gram-negative bacteria share flagellin. With plants being stationary, a specific molecular pattern of flagellin can be recognized by plants to determine phytopathogenic bacteria in plant defense. As discovered by the ectopic expression of FLS2 study, FLS2 is directed related to flagellin perception; so, by discovery and by natural way of the plant, FLS2 is the gene responsible for perception of flagellin which signals a plant defense response. Things are not all settled here because, as mentioned earlier, gram positive and gram negative bacteria share flagellin which means that plants cannot distinguish between avirulent and virulent bacteria. This could prove extremely useful when an abundance of pathogenic bacteria are present; however, this can also prove inefficient when plant defense response is occurring due to flagellin perception of avirulent bacteria, or one would think. In actuality, avirulent bacteria defense responses are higher than virulent bacteria defense response due to the presence of multiple specific elicitors. Hutcheson (1997) found that the tertiary and quaternary structures of protein elicitors are dependent on elicitor activity. Even so, resistant gene products are commonly found in Leucine-rich repeat domains, which is the extracellular domain of FLS2; and hrp genes are directly related to disease incitement and hypersensitive response to resistant plants. In short, the more elicitors that are present within flagellin perception, the more plant defense response will occur regardless of virulence. It is just more common for avirulent pathogen to produce more elicitors.

== Expression in tomato cells ==
The design of this experiment is similar to previous literature from and but unlike those two studies, in this study, the promoter used was the 35S cauliflower mosaic virus–promoter used to express FLS2 coding sequences fused to a triple c-myc tag. What happens to a FLS2 gene in Arabidopsis is known, but this study looks at how the FLS2 gene in Arabidopsis may affect a plant that contains a FLS2 gene that does not respond similarly to Arabidopsis. Figure 1 in shows how tomato cells with no introduction to an Arabidopsis FLS2 gene show no response to the perception of either flg15 or flg22. However, when viewing the Arabidopsis FLS2 gene and the tomato cells with the Arabidopsis FLS2 gene added, it is clear that the responses are similar due to the presence of the Arabidopsis FLS2 gene.

== Alkalinization response induced by the flagellin derivative flg22-ΔA^{16/17} ==
In previous literature, alkalinization has been used to show ion fluxes across membranes. In this study, alkalinization is shown to be induced by the flagellin derivative flg22-ΔA^{16/17} in tomato plants expressing the Arabidopsis FLS2 gene. Extracellular alkalinization was used to elicit a response in these plant types. Alkalinization had no effect on non-treated tomato plants, but increased binding activity to FLS2 was shown with no increase in sensitivity toward flg22 in the tomato plants expressing the Arabidopsis FLS2 gene. This lack of increase in sensitivity could be attributed to a number of factors that are unknown, yet hypothesized. Even so, the binding of tomato plants expressing Arabidopsis FLS2 gene showed similar sensitivity of flg15 to that of normal tomato plants. This indicates that both the Arabidopsis FLS2 gene and the tomato plant FLS2 gene are both working in tomato plants expressing the Arabidopsis FLS2 gene. The Arabidopsis FLS2 gene responds to flg22 and the natural tomato FLS2 gene responds to flg15. Furthermore, the tomato FLS2 gene was analyzed for any derivatives that might be responsible for gene expression. Although less active than flg22, its derivative flg22-ΔA^{16/17} was found to elicit a medium alkalinization response in Arabidopsis FLS2 gene in both Arabipdopsis and tomato plants expressing the Arabidopsis FLS2 gene. Essentially, the majority of flagellin perception occurring in tomato plants expressing the Arabidopsis FLS2 gene is occurring because of the Arabidopsis FLS2 gene, while a minor portion of flagellin perception can be attributed to the tomato FLS2 gene.
