= The Nervous Mechanism of Plants =

Botany book by Jagadish Chandra Bose (1926)

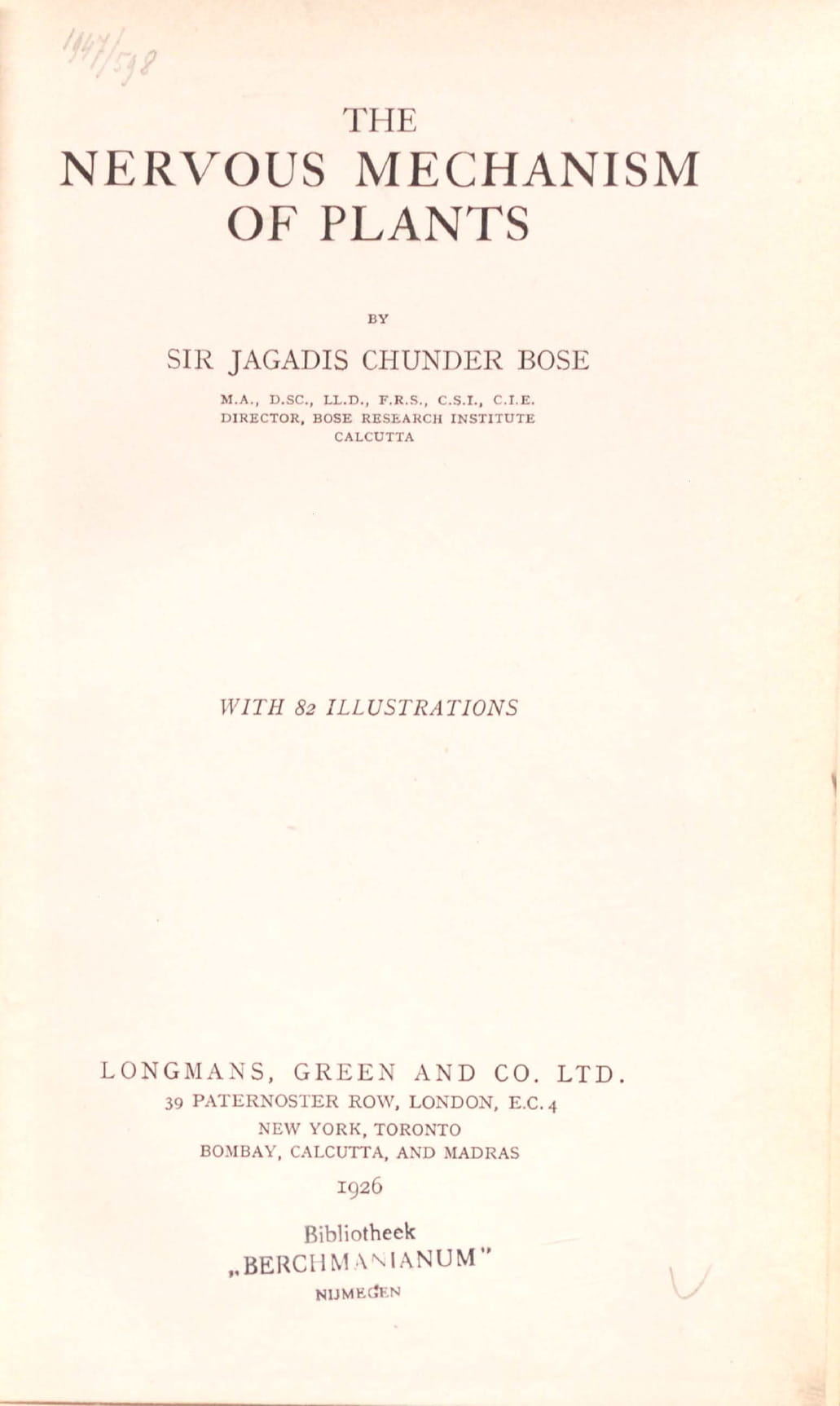
- Author: Sir Jagadish Chandra Bose
- Language: English
- Genre: Non-fiction
- Publication date: 1926

"The Nervous Mechanism of Plants", published in 1926, is a botany book by Sir Jagadish Chandra Bose which summarises his most recent findings in the area of plant physiology. Bose had previously investigated this topic in books such as Plant response as a means of physiological investigation from 1906, or The physiology of photosynthesis, published in 1924. In this book, he proposes that the response mechanisms of plants to stimuli are physiologically similar to those in animals.

== Context ==
During the 20th century, there was a vast increase in research regarding botany. This derived from the new technologies acquired as well as the better facilities available and increased number of botanists interested in expanding this scientific field. The increase in research resulted in new discoveries, new concepts and new fields of botanical studies known as disciplines. These are morphology, physiology, ecology and systematics. Sir Jagadish Chandra Bose (1858-1937) was among the earliest and most esteemed pioneers of plant physiology in the early 1900s. His investigation on plant-response started with the discovery of the electric response of non-living matter which was published in 1900 by the International Congress of Science in Paris. Investigations on living matter indicated that physico-chemical reactions were responsible for their responses. 'Response of the Living and Non-Living' published in 1902, revealed that every plant and every plant organ is excitable and responds to stimulus by electric response. Furthermore, 'Plant Response as a means of physiological investigation' published in 1906, proved, through the use of a method of mechanical response, that the conduction of excitation of a plant is the same as the one occurring in the nerves of animals. In 1907, 'Comparative Electro-Physiology' was published and provided, through an independent method of electric response, the same results acquired from the method of mechanical response. Additionally, in 'Researchers on Irritability of Plants' (1913) a new device of resonant recorder was introduced which created accurate measurements of the velocity of transmissions of nervous impulse. Bose created this device to be able to demonstrate that the reason why the leaves of the Mimosa plant fall, when the plant is stimulated, is because an electrical signal travels through the stem. The results acquired from this device provided further evidence for his work on nerve impulses in plants. Other relevant books include "Physiology of the Ascent of Sap" published in 1923 and "The physiology of photosynthesis" published in 1924.

The book 'The nervous mechanism of plants', published in 1926, gives a connected account of the results of the authors' previous publications as well as the introduction of new materials on sensory and motor impulses. In the 1900s the advance of knowledge in plant-physiology was paralysed and therefore no sensitive and accurate methods were introduced. This state of lack of knowledge inspired the author to create 'The nervous mechanism of plants'. The aim of the work was to materially advance the knowledge of nervous impulse in general with the realisation that the physiological mechanism of a plant is identical to that of the animal. On account of this work, among others, plant physiology studies made considerable progress in linking electrical signals with pollination, phloem transport, plant defenses and, respiration and photosynthesis.

== Content ==
This book contains 17 chapters on 243 pages which investigate the different aspects of neural transmission in plants.

The first chapter serves as an introduction to the subject matter, in which Bose informs the reader that plants can react to electrical and mechanical stimulation rapidly through a mechanism that is invisible to the eye and does not seem to cause changes in the plant tissue or sap. In chapter two, Bose criticises two contemporary theories that sought to explain the phenomenon described in the introduction. He shows that both the Theory of Hydromechanical Stimulation and the Theory of Transpiration Current contain logical flaws and he presents contradicting evidence in ten experiments that disprove both theories. In the following chapter Bose presents his own hypothesis which states that impulse transmission in plants is similar to the transmission in animals. He then supports his claim with several experimental results.

In the following chapters 4 to 13, Bose explains nervous transmission in plant tissues in greater detail, especially the creation of an electric potential in response to a stimulus. He then measures the velocity, direction and other characteristics of the potential while comparing his results to animal tissues. He adds diagrams to illustrate his experimental setups, and supports and explains his findings with tables and graphs. Many experiments are conducted on Mimosa pudica, which is known for its quick retraction movement upon touch. In chapters 14 to 16, Bose applies his theory to explain plant behaviour such as the response to light stimuli or reflex arcs. The final chapter serves as a summary of the book in which Bose recapitulates the key aspects from each chapter.

== Reception ==
Published in 1926, the book "The Nervous Mechanism of Plants" by Jagadish Chandra Bose was revolutionary as he was one of the first plant biologists to be recognised for his research on the nervous system of plants. He had already achieved recognition for his endeavours in physics where he studied optical properties of radio waves, but transitioned into plant physiology. At the time, his discoveries were extremely progressive and not compatible with contemporary ideas, sparking much dispute, skepticism and criticism from the public. They believed that his attempts to interlink the idea of electromagnetism and living plants were antagonistic at best. The Western paradigm at the time was deeply rooted in the belief that cognition was only present in animals and not plants, which led to much of this skepticism as Bose attempted to prove the opposite. In India, the colonial education system did not value scientific studies. In 1835, Macaulay proposed the government funding should go to studies in the liberal arts and not science. This also contributed towards the lack of recognition toward the book at the time. For the next few decades after publication, little research in the field was done in order to investigate Bose's findings until after the 1950s. In time, these discoveries were gradually accepted by other plant physiologists and researchers across the globe. After publication, Bose's views on plant mechanics gained support from numerous Nobel Laureates such as Huxley, Shaw and Einstein. Racism during the 1920s also impacted how Bose's work was accepted by the public. Bose was a physics professor at the Presidency College in Calcutta. Getting this job in order to further his botanical studies in order to write the book was a challenge as he needed to be appointed by Lord Ripon who believed that Indians were not capable of studying science. Racism was also prominent in his job as he only received one third of the salary of an Englishman occupying the same position. Due to this, many people were skeptical about his credibility and therefore did not accept his ideas. The opposition of Bose and many of his ideas had more to do with prejudice against his ethnic group and racism rather than the actual scientific content, yet it still influenced the reception of the book in a negative manner as people refused to consider his discoveries. After his transition to plant electrophysiology, The Royal Society would not publish his papers which resulted in his work not being acknowledged more widely.

Bose's death, in 1937, left the topic of electrical signalling in plants as a topic of little interest to scientists at the time. Only in 1973, the book "The Secret Life of Plants" was published by Peter Tompkins and Christopher Bird which included a chapter describing research done by Bose in a positive manner. This resparked the subject in the plant neurobiology community. Bose's work inspired many of his students who all transitioned into scientists in physics or biology with allowed the further development of the subject that is still studied today.

During Bose's lifetime, he was often criticised for his work, especially regarding plant physiology. These controversies were published in "The Time," an influential newspaper in Britain at the time and following that, a committee was appointed in order to examine his work. Tests were carried out by Sir William Bragg (part of the Fellowship of the Royal Society) in the late 1920s, and he reported that "[the] Magnetic Crescograph correctly recorded the response of plants at a magnification of ten million time." Following that, there was a shift in perspective from the idea that plants mainly used chemical signals to a viewpoint that plants also utilise electrical signals. Numerous plant physiologists "warmly welcomed the scientific advance" and Bose's book discredited the preconceptions about the inadequacies of Indians to perform scientific research which consequently allowed the public to start accepting his theories.

The book is becoming globally accepted and numerous of Bose's concepts are being used in literature and education to highlight and examine nervous activity in plants such as memory, intelligence and cognition. Plant neurobiology is a discipline in its infancy, but Bose has laid the foundations in electromagnetism and biophysics. "The Nervous Mechanism of Plants," can be found in university libraries around the world such as the Maastricht University Library, as part of the Special Collections which hold books of historical relevance.
