= Cleve Backster =

CIA interrogation specialist (1924–2013)

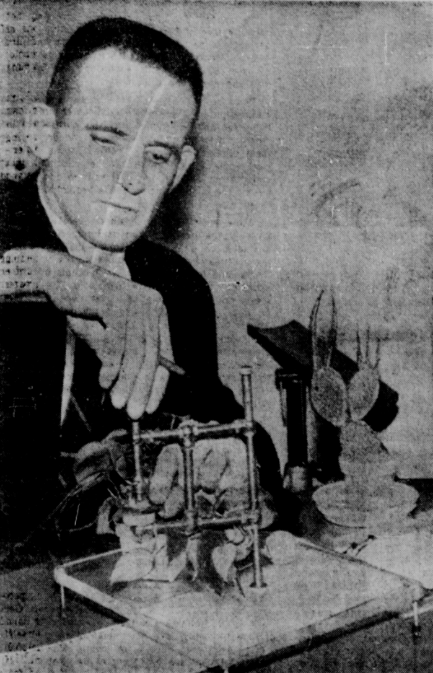
- Backster in 1969
- Born: Grover Cleveland Backster Jr. February 27, 1924; Lafayette, New Jersey
- Died: June 24, 2013 (aged 89); San Diego, California
- Occupation: Interrogation specialist
- Known for: Theory of "Primary Perception"

Grover Cleveland "Cleve" Backster Jr. (February 27, 1924 – June 24, 2013) was an interrogation specialist for the Central Intelligence Agency (CIA), best known for his experiments with plants using a polygraph instrument in the 1960s which led to his theory of primary perception where he claimed that plants feel pain and have extrasensory perception (ESP), which was widely reported in the media.

== Biography ==
He was born in Lafayette Township, New Jersey on February 27, 1924. Backster began his career as an Interrogation Specialist with the CIA, and went on to become Chairman of the Research and Instrument Committee of the Academy for Scientific Interrogation. He is the former director of the Backster School of Lie Detection in San Diego, California and was a polygraph instructor before his experiments on plants. He got a D.Sc. in Complementary Medicine from Medicina Alternativa in 1996 and was on the faculty of the California Institute for Human Science Graduate School and Research Center founded by Hiroshi Motoyama which is unaccredited. He wrote the book Primary Perception: Biocommunication with Plants, Foods, and Human Cells which describes 36 years of his work and was published in 2003. He died on June 24, 2013, after a prolonged illness.

Backster founded the CIA's polygraph unit shortly after World War II. The Backster School of Lie Detection, originally founded in New York City in 1960 after Cleve Backster left his position with the Central Intelligence Agency, was located in San Diego, California. The school trained law enforcement officers in the use of the polygraph, or "lie detector," test. While the school is no longer operational, its legacy continues, as it has been taken over by PEAK Polygraph Training.

== Primary perception ==
=== Findings ===
Backster's study of plants began in the 1960s, and he reported observing that a polygraph instrument attached to a plant leaf registered a change in electrical resistance when the plant was harmed or even threatened with harm. His work was inspired by the research of physicist Jagadish Chandra Bose, who claimed to have discovered that playing certain kinds of music in the area where plants grew caused them to grow faster. Bose used a crescograph to measure plant response to various stimuli and demonstrated feeling in plants. From the analysis of the variation of the cell membrane potential of plants under different circumstances, he hypothesized that plants can "feel pain, understand affection etc". Bose wrote two books about this subject in 1902 (Response in the Living and Non-living) and 1926 (The Nervous Mechanism of Plants).

In February 1966, Backster attached polygraph electrodes to a Dracaena cane plant, to measure at first the time taken for water to reach the leaves. The electrodes are used to measure galvanic skin response and the plant showed readings which resembled that of a human. This made Backster try different scenarios, and the readings went off the chart when he pictured burning the leaf, because according to him, the plant registered a stress response to his thoughts of harming it. He conducted another similar experiment where he observed a plant's response to the death of a brine shrimp in another room; his results convinced him that plants demonstrated telepathic awareness. He argued that plants perceived human intentions, and as he began to investigate further, he also reported finding that other human thoughts and emotions caused reactions in plants, which could be recorded by a polygraph instrument. He termed the plants' sensitivity to thoughts "Primary Perception", and published his findings from the experiments in the International Journal of Parapsychology in 1968. Soviet scientists invited Backster to the first Psychotronic Association conference in Prague in 1973 and his paper was entitled "Evidence of Primary Perception at a Cellular Level in Plant and Animal Life". After 1973, he further experimented on yoghurt bacteria, eggs and human sperm and he claimed his results showed "primary perception" could be measured in all living things.

=== Reactions by the scientific community ===
Controlled experiments that have attempted to replicate Backster's findings have failed, and the theory was not accepted since it did not follow the scientific method. At the 141st annual meeting of American Association for the Advancement of Science, the panel of biologists found the claim unsupportable. The results seemed to be spontaneous; repeatability is still a problem, for him and the people who tried to perform his experiment. His lack of control experiments was criticized and explanations, such as that the polygraphs were responding to static electricity build-up and humidity changes, were put forward. The reliability of the polygraph test itself has been questioned. Plants have cellulose cell walls but do not possess sensory organs, which rules out the possibility of plants having ESP.

Biologist Arthur Galston told St. Petersburg Times, "We know plants don't have nervous systems. But they do have little electrical currents flowing through them and are subject to outside manipulation." He further said that plants can show altered electrical responses to light, chemical agents and disease but he "draws the line" to the claim of them "responding to human thoughts and events, including life elimination." Scientists at the Cornell University and the Science Unlimited Research Foundation, San Antonio, Texas, could not find results that supported Backster's findings in the experiment, where the death of brine shrimp caused electrical voltage changes in the leaves of a plant in another room. Backster explained that they did not follow the exact laboratory techniques which he had used to perform the original experiments and he has not attempted to repeat them himself.

In 2005 Kari Byron, Grant Imahara and Tory Belleci from the science based program MythBusters also tried to replicate the results of primary perception. They used the same model of polygraph (Stoelting 22500) and took it a step further by using an EEG machine, but all tests failed.

== Popular culture and influence ==
Backster's work became popular and drew public attention, and his findings were similar to the beliefs of Hindus, Buddhists and New Age followers. Some parapsychologists criticized his work, suggesting the results were due to "his own telekinetic abilities". His theory is in books like Peter Tompkins and Christopher Bird's The Secret Life of Plants and Robert Stone's The Secret Life of Your Cells. He was a guest on June 27, 2007, on the evening radio show, "Coast To Coast AM", during which he discussed with host George Noory and with callers to the program his experiments with primary perception and findings of an interconnection between all living cells. He had been a guest several times before on Art Bell's Coast to Coast, as well as on Jeff Rense's radio shows, and has presented papers at many international conferences and meetings as well as those in the US.

Marcel Vogel claimed to be able to duplicate this effect "using plants as transducers for bio-energetic fields from the human mind". Backster's work caught the attention of the Church of Scientology founder, Ron Hubbard. Hubbard officially used the polygraph as an "E-meter" and he too, published plant communication experiments on tomato plants.

Backster's "Primary Perception" theory was a subject of the Discovery Channel television show MythBusters. After all human and environmental stimuli that could alter the results were removed, the Mythbusters team reproduced Backster's experiments with the dracaena plant, yoghurt, saliva and eggs. They performed some of these experiments using a model of polygraph machine identical to the one used by Backster in his original research, while other experiments were performed with an EEG instrument, which is based on a different technology than the polygraph. Experiments where the team employed the same model of polygraph machine used by Backster showed positive results with the plant reacting both to actual harm, as well as thoughts of harm. In another segment of the episode, the team tested with an EEG by connecting it to a plant to check whether it would "see" eggs being catapulted randomly into boiling water. The EEG instrument registered no change in the plant and the myth was considered as "busted" in that particular segment of the episode. The differences between the two technologies likely played a key role in the differing results.

In an episode of Adam Ruins Everything that discussed the pitfalls of forensic science, there was a cutaway during the segment which criticized polygraphs and also referenced Backster's Primary Perception experiment.
