= Ptolemy Tompkins =

Ptolemy Tompkins (born 1962) is an American writer specializing in books describing the role of the spiritual in ordinary life. His best-known work, "Proof of Angels" (Howard Books, 2014), co-authored with Utah police officer Tyler Beddoes, focuses on the death of Jennifer Lynn Groesbeck, whose car veered into the Spanish Fork River just outside the town of Spanish Fork, and the mysterious voice which Beddoes, along with three other responding officers, heard inside the car as they struggled to right it. Tompkins also collaborated with Eben Alexander on his mega-selling "Proof of Heaven" (Simon & Schuster, 2012) and its follow-up, "The Map of Heaven" (Simon & Schuster, 2014).

== Biography ==
Tompkins was born in Washington, D.C., educated at Sarah Lawrence College, and currently lives off the coast of Maine. He is the son of best-selling author Peter Tompkins (A Spy in Rome, Secrets of the Great Pyramid, The Secret Life of Plants, and others), and for nine years was an in-house editor at Guideposts Magazine. Paradise Fever (Avon Books, ISBN 038097438X), his 1997 memoir, chronicles his childhood in the early seventies, focusing on the time his father spent searching for Atlantis in the waters off of the island of Bimini in the Bahamas. His The Divine Life of Animals (Crown, 2010), argues for the validity of the idea that animals possess souls, while The Modern Book of the Dead (Atria, 2012) sketches a contemporary map of the afterlife focusing on the work of mid-twentieth-century afterlife investigators Robert Crookall and Jane Sherwood. Other books include The Beaten Path: Field Notes on Getting Wise in a Wisdom-Crazy World (William Morrow, 2000,ISBN 978-0-380-97822-9), which focuses on Tompkins' step-brother, the Buddhist Abbot Nicholas Vreeland. His first book, This Tree Grows Out of Hell, first published in 1990 but re-released in revised form by Sterling Books in 2010 (Sterling, ISBN 978-1-4027-4882-0), is a spiritual history of Mesoamerica heavily influenced by the thinking of Ken Wilber and Owen Barfield. "Proof of God" (Howard Books, 2017), written with astrophysicist Bernard Haisch, explores Haisch's work on the Zero Point Field and Haisch's contention that the physical world is analogous to a computer simulation, the ultimate programmer of which is God. Tompkins also appears in "Monk with a Camera," a 2014 documentary about his step-brother Nicholas Vreeland.

Tompkins' mother is Jerree Talbot Smith. He has two siblings, Timothy Christopher Tompkins (deceased), and Robin Ray of Hobe Sound, Florida.
