= In Search of... (TV series) =

American TV series

- In Search of... title screen
- Also known as: Great Mysteries of the World (Australian broadcasts)
- Created by: Alan Landsburg
- Presented by: Leonard Nimoy; Mitch Pileggi; Zachary Quinto
- Country of origin: United States
- Original language: English
- No. of episodes: Specials: 3 Original Series: 144; First Revival: 8 Second Revival: 18

Production
- Running time: 23 minutes
- Production companies: Alan Landsburg Productions (original); Kaos Entertainment (first revival); The Landsburg Company (first revival); Studios USA (first revival); Universal Television Alternative Studio (second revival)

Original release
- Network: Syndicated; Sci-Fi Channel; History
- Release: September 20, 1976 – November 29, 2019

In Search of... is an American television series that was broadcast weekly from 1976 to 1982, devoted to mysterious phenomena. It was created after the success of three one-hour documentaries produced by creator Alan Landsburg: In Search of Ancient Astronauts in 1973 (based on Erich von Däniken's 1968 book Chariots of the Gods? and the homonymous 1970 film by Harald Reinl), In Search of Ancient Mysteries (1974), and The Outer Space Connection in 1975 (later adapted into popular paperbacks written by Landsburg), all of which featured narration by Rod Serling, who was the initial choice to host the spinoff show. Serling died before production started, and Leonard Nimoy was then selected to be the host. The series was revived with host Mitch Pileggi in 2002 and again in 2018 with Zachary Quinto for the History channel.

The original series was shown in Australia in the 1980s under the title Great Mysteries of the World, with each episode having an introduction and conclusion presented by television presenter Scott Lambert.

== Format ==
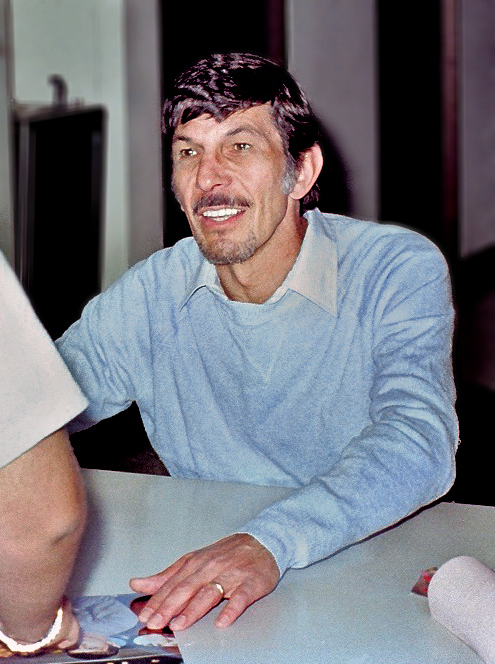
The show was originally hosted by Leonard Nimoy.

Each episode of the program explored a general or specific topic in one of several general categories as given in the opening titles: Extraterrestrials, Magic & Witchcraft, Missing Persons, Myths & Monsters, Lost Civilizations, and Special Phenomena (changed to Strange Phenomena from season 3 onward). The program conducted investigations into the controversial and paranormal (e.g., UFOs, Bigfoot, and the Loch Ness Monster). Additionally, it featured episodes about mysterious historical events and personalities such as Anna Anderson, the Lincoln Assassination, the Jack the Ripper murders, infamous cults (e.g., Jim Jones), and missing persons, cities, and ships (e.g., Amelia Earhart, Jimmy Hoffa, D. B. Cooper, the Mary Celeste, the Titanic, the lost Roanoke Colony). Each episode's opening credits included a verbal disclaimer about the conjectural nature of the evidence and theories to be presented:

This series presents information based in part on theory and conjecture. The producer's purpose is to suggest some possible explanations, but not necessarily the only ones, to the mysteries we will examine.

The program included interviews, reenactments, and host segments including Nimoy on location or in studio, and each episode featured voiceovers by Nimoy. The music was composed by Laurin M. Rinder and W. Michael Lewis. A soundtrack album was released on AVI Records in 1977.

Nimoy wrote an episode about the turbulent life of artist Vincent van Gogh, having earlier played the artist's brother Theo in a one-man show. As part of his research, Nimoy found records in the archives of the hospital where Van Gogh was treated that suggested that he suffered from epilepsy rather than mental illness.

The show also spawned at least six spin-off books, all written by Landsburg with forewords by Nimoy: In Search of Lost Civilizations, In Search of Extraterrestrials, In Search of Magic and Witchcraft, In Search of Strange Phenomena, In Search of Missing Persons, and In Search of Myths and Monsters, with an additional book that collected the best segments from these existing volumes.

In 1978, Landsburg produced a Bigfoot documentary using portions of two In Search of... episodes ("The Monster Hunters" and "The Yeti") called Manbeast! Myth or Monster, based on his book In Search of Myths and Monsters. Though Nimoy had written the foreword to Landsburg's book, he did not narrate this documentary.

Reruns of the In Search of... series aired during the early 1990s on the A&E Network. In the later 1990s, the show aired on another of the A&E Television Networks' properties, the History Channel. The licensing agreement with MCA Television/Universal Domestic Television expired in the early 2000s, ending the show's run. When the show aired on A&E, a re-recording of the original theme music was used plus a new alternate theme. The original opening titles were also modernized. In this incarnation, virtually all of Nimoy's on-camera appearances in the series were replaced with reused footage, so viewers could hear Nimoy but not see him.

A short-lived revival of the show, featuring Mitch Pileggi, aired on the Sci-Fi Channel in 2002.

In January 2018, it was announced that Zachary Quinto, who, like Nimoy, stars as Spock in the rebooted Star Trek films, would host the revived version of the show on History Channel. On March 27, 2019, History Channel announced the series was renewed for a second season.

== Episodes ==
Seasons of In Search Of...
Season	Episodes	Originally released		
Season	Episodes	First released	Last released	Network
Specials	3	January 5, 1973	February 12, 1975	NBC
1	24	1976	September 10, 1977	NBC
2	24	December 24, 1977	June 1, 1978	NBC
3	24	September 14, 1978	May 17, 1979	NBC
4	24	September 20, 1979	March 14, 1980	NBC
5	24	September 20, 1980	May 19, 1981	NBC
6	24	September 21, 1981	March 1, 1982	NBC
1	8	October 4, 2002	November 22, 2002	Sci-Fi Channel
1	10	July 20, 2018	September 14, 2018	The History Channel
2	8	October 4, 2019	November 29, 2019	The History Channel

=== Specials ===
Three specials hosted by Rod Serling aired from 1973-1975.

No.	Title	Directed by	Written by	Original release date
1	"In Search of Ancient Astronauts"	Harald Reinl	Don Ringe	January 5, 1973 (NBC)
Examines speculation about purported ancient astronauts, aliens that would have landed on Earth in ancient times, being responsible for many of mankind's oldest mysteries.
2	"In Search of Ancient Mysteries"	Fred Warshofsky	Fred Warshofsky	January 31, 1974 (NBC)
An examination of mysteries of the ancient world and their connection to the possibility that aliens visited Earth.
3	"The Outer Space Connection"	Fred Warshofsky	Fred Warshofsky	February 12, 1975 (Arizona)
Examines the speculation that aliens have visited Earth in ancient times, and built structures to which they will return at a future date. Screened at movie theaters throughout 1975.

=== Original Series ===
The original series ran for six seasons, hosted by Leonard Nimoy.

==== Season 1 (1976–1977) ====
No. overall	No. in season	Title	Directed by	Written by	Original release date	Prod. code
1	1	"Other Voices"	H.G. Stark	Roz Karson	April 17, 1977	726
Other Voices: Examines groundbreaking experiments that show the possibility that plants respond to people's thoughts. Guests in this episode include Marcel Vogel, Dorothy Retallack, Kendall Johnson, and Cleve Backster.
2	2	"Strange Visitors"	Unknown	S: Hans Holzer; W: Hans Holzer & Robert L. Long	December 20, 1976	703
Strange Visitors: Was Oracle Chamber, which lies beneath New Hampshire's Mystery Hill, built by ancient Phoenicians who traveled to the continent thousands of years ago? Guests include Robert Stone, Hans Holzer, and Barry Fell.
3	3	"Ancient Aviators"	Unknown	Robert Long & Deborah Blum	April 24, 1977	708
Ancient Aviators: Are there signs of alien visitation here on Earth? Might the mysterious markings on the Nazca Plain in Peru be landing instructions for UFOs?
4	4	"The Bermuda Triangle"	H.G. Stark	Alan Lansburg	September 27, 1976	715
The Bermuda Triangle: Probes a radio broadcast claim that the graveyard of ships and planes is actually a testing area for spacemen. Guests include Frank Flynn, Bob Spielman, Ray Smithers, and Carlton Hamilton
5	5	"Bigfoot"	Nicholas Webster	Larry L. Badger	April 28, 1977	713
Bigfoot: An evaluation of giant footprints and other evidence which some believe proves that the half-man, half-animal creature really exists.
6	6	"Killer Bees"	Unknown	Alex Pomasanoff	May 1, 1977	735
Killer Bees: A photographic report from Brazil on the behavior of the bees and genetic experiments underway to stop the savage swarms from reaching the U.S.
7	7	"Earthquakes"	Unknown	Alex Pomasanoff	May 7, 1977	728
Earthquakes: An examination of the techniques which scientists are developing in order to study seismic activity and predict quakes.
8	8	"The Mummy's Curse"	Unknown	Robert L. Long	May 14, 1977	734
The Mummy's Curse: Probes the claim that a protective curse on King Tutankhamun's tomb accounted for a chain of mysterious deaths.
9	9	"Martians"	Unknown	Robert L. Long	May 21, 1977	733
Martians: Offers the theory that the Red Planet is dying of climate changes and suggests that Earth may face a similar fate. Gerald Soffen is a guest in the episode.
10	10	"Atlantis"	Unknown	Fred Warshofsky	May 22, 1977	701
Atlantis: Explores the possibility that 14 huge stone buildings beneath the waters of The Bahamas, and a 2000-year-old computer part, are part of the lost empire of Atlantis.
11	11	"Psychic Detectives"	Unknown	Deborah Blum	May 26, 1977	736
Psychic Detectives: Meet a unique scientific detective squad that uses E.S.P. as an effective crime-solving tool.
12	12	"A Call from Space"	Unknown	Christine Zurbach Wiser	May 28, 1977	729
A Call from Space: Can the space technologies that discovered other galaxies help us communicate with other life?
13	13	"Learning ESP"	Unknown	Robert L. Long	May 28, 1977	730
Learning ESP: Do the powers of extrasensory perception really exist, and can they be taught?
14	14	"Nazi Plunder"	Unknown	Tyrone Fox	May 29, 1977	TBA
Nazi Plunder: Pursues the rumor of Nazi plunder worth billions and a 30-year-old track that could lead to it.
15	15	"Amelia Earhart"	Unknown	Alex Pomasanoff	June 1, 1977	718
Amelia Earhart: Runs down rumors that the famous aviator, who disappeared during a 1937 flight over the Pacific Ocean, was on a spy mission.
16	16	"Dracula"	H. G. Stark	Jeremy Brink	June 8, 1977	712
Dracula: Investigates the life and recorded history of Vlad the Impaler in Romania, with comparisons to the main character of the famous Bram Stoker novel.
17	17	"The Easter Island Massacre"	H. G. Stark	Deborah Blum	June 15, 1977	709
The Easter Island Massacre: Provides answers to the mysteries of how 70-ton giant stones came to the remote island and who might have destroyed some of them.
18	18	"Ghosts"	H. G. Stark	Hans Holzer & Robert L. Long	October 4, 1976	704
Ghosts: Studies specters and a parapsychologist's theory that they are troubled earthbound souls in need of help.
19	19	"Life After Death"	H. G. Stark	Deborah Blum	June 29, 1977	720
Life after Death: A visit to a soul research institute for firsthand accounts of people who claim they have died and come back to life.
20	20	"The Loch Ness Monster"	H. G. Stark	Robert L. Long	September 20, 1976	725
The Loch Ness Monster: A hunt for the leviathan which has so far eluded all expeditions to prove that it truly exists. Includes footage of Bob Ballard as he performs underwater photography in an attempt to identify the monster.
21	21	"UFOs"	H. G. Stark	Robert L. Long	October 11, 1976	702
UFOs: An evaluation of reports by people who have seen "saucers", and the growing body of evidence that America is regularly being visited by UFOs.
22	22	"Voodoo"	H. G. Stark	Alan Landsburg	July 26, 1977	714
Voodoo: Experience an actual voodoo rite, and meet a priest dedicated to disarming its effects.
23	23	"Inca Treasure"	H. G. Stark	Robert Long	August 11, 1977	TBA
Inca Treasures: Camera crews accompany a Peruvian excavation party in quest of a great Inca city believed lost for 300 years.
24	24	"The Magic of Stonehenge"	Unknown	Deborah Blum	September 10, 1977	727
The Magic of Stonehenge: Suggests the site could be the source of a mysterious power that might hold all of Britain in a strange magnetic force field.

==== Season 2 (1977–1978) ====
No. overall	No. in season	Title	Directed by	Written by	Original release date	Prod. code
25	1	"The Lost Dutchman Mine"	Unknown	Richard J. Wells	December 24, 1977	TBA
The Lost Dutchman Mine: An investigation into why hundreds of gold hunters have died searching for a lost treasure ever since a German prospector wandered out of Arizona's Superstition Mountains in the 1860s. Is there really cursed gold hidden there, as Apache lore suggests?
26	2	"The Man Who Would Not Die"	Unknown	Nicholas Webster	December 31, 1977	753
The Man Who Would Not Die: The fascinating saga of the Count of St. Germain, who dazzled the courts of Europe for over 100 years, leading some to believe he was immortal. Elizabeth Clare Prophet describes the Church Universal and Triumphant's reverence for St. Germain.
27	3	"Firewalkers"	Unknown	Norma Thorn	January 5, 1978	719
Firewalkers: How do people walk on red-hot coals without being burned?
28	4	"Mayan Mysteries"	Unknown	Terry A. Landau	January 7, 1978	744
Mayan Mysteries: The Mayans of Mexico carved an advanced civilization out of the jungles, then disappeared. Where did they come from? Where did they go?
29	5	"Astrology"	Unknown	Peter Rosten	January 12, 1978	750
Astrology: Can astronomical movements affect the affairs of man? Leonard Nimoy reviews the long history of astrology and looks at its attraction today.
30	6	"Michael Rockefeller"	Unknown	Alex Pomasanoff	January 21, 1978	740
Michael Rockefeller: Did he drown or was he murdered? An investigation into the disappearance of Nelson Rockefeller's youngest son who vanished without a trace among some of the most primitive peoples in the world.
31	7	"Hurricanes"	Unknown	Alex Pomasanoff	January 26, 1978	758
Hurricanes: Take a close-up look at these violent killers that have taken the lives of hundreds of thousands of people. Can they be controlled or prevented?
32	8	"The Ogopogo Monster"	Unknown	Nicholas Webster	January 28, 1978	762
The Ogopogo Monster: This large beast, similar to Scotland's Loch Ness Monster, is claimed to have been seen by thousands of people in western Canada.
33	9	"Pyramid Secrets"	Unknown	Robert Long	February 4, 1978	746
Pyramid Secrets: Examines the theory that the pyramids of Egypt were built to provide shelter from a holocaust, not as tombs for the pharaohs.
34	10	"Dead Sea Scrolls"	Unknown	Robert Long	February 9, 1978	748
Dead Sea Scrolls: The story of the 2,000-year-old scrolls, discovered by a shepherd, that revolutionized religious thought.
35	11	"Reincarnation"	Unknown	Hans Holzer and Robert Long	February 11, 1978	706
Reincarnation: Reviews case histories of people who claim to have lived in previous lifetimes.
36	12	"The Shark Worshippers"	Unknown	Edward Garrick	February 18, 1978	760
The Shark Worshippers: A trip to remote parts of the Pacific where man-eating sharks are considered gods. Adults pray to them and children swim unafraid among them.
37	13	"Anastasia"	Unknown	Alex Pomasanoff	February 23, 1978	737
Anastasia: An examination of evidence that the youngest daughter of Russia's Tsar Nicholas II Aleksandrovich Romanov survived the family executions, and settled in Charlottesville, Virginia. NOTE: This was produced years before Anna Anderson Manahan, as she in time came to be known, was proven, through DNA evidence which could not have been forensically examined at the time, to have been an impostor.
38	14	"The Secrets of Life"	Unknown	Philip Dauber	February 25, 1978	751
Secrets of Life: Explores the possibility that human life can be created in laboratories engaged in DNA research.
39	15	"Immortality"	Unknown	Alex Pomasanoff	February 27, 1978	742
Immortality: Looks at scientific discoveries of new methods of prolonging human life, such as cryonics, which can suspend life for centuries.
40	16	"The Swamp Monster"	Unknown	Clifford Hoelscher and Robert Long	March 4, 1978	738
The Swamp Monster: An investigation of reports that a huge man-like beast is living in the swamps of Louisiana's bayou.
41	17	"Hypnosis"	Unknown	Robert Fiveson	March 9, 1978	759
Hypnosis: A look back at the great scientist Franz Mesmer, whose hypnotic techniques are being used in modern surgery, teaching, and police investigations. (See also Learning ESP.)
42	18	"Troy"	Unknown	J. Francis Hitching and Robert Long	March 11, 1978	752
Troy: The story of Heinrich Schliemann, an eccentric self-made millionaire obsessed with discovering the ruins of Troy at a time when the city was considered a fable that never existed. He discovered not one but nine ancient cities in Turkey, and recovered a hoard of spectacular relics.
43	19	"Witch Doctors"	Unknown	Alex Pomasanoff	March 18, 1978	732
Witch doctors: Leonard Nimoy hosts this look at ancient folk medicines that are being reinstituted today in modern mental institutions and are yielding positive results.
44	20	"Haunted Castles"	Unknown	J. Francis Hitching and Jim McGinn	April 27, 1978	754
Haunted Castles: Probe into one of the world's most haunted places.
45	21	"Butch Cassidy"	TBD	Nicholas Webster	May 1978	743
Butch Cassidy: Examines the possibility that Butch Cassidy was not killed in Bolivia along with the Sundance Kid, but actually lived a full life and died peacefully in 1937.
46	22	"Deadly Ants"	TBD	Alex Pomasanoff	May 1978	739
Deadly Ants: A look at the billions of fire ants that march across the southern United States and the failure so far of all attempts to stop them.
47	23	"The Coming Ice Age"	Unknown	Philip Dauber	May 5, 1978	741
The Coming Ice Age: An inquiry into whether the dramatic weather changes in America's northern states mean that a new ice age is approaching.
48	24	"The Garden of Eden"	Unknown	Robert Long	June 1, 1978	TBA
Garden of Eden: Using the Old Testament as a road map, researchers attempt to trace the possible site of the original Garden to India, China, and an island off the coast of Saudi Arabia.

==== Season 3 (1978–1979) ====
No. overall	No. in season	Title	Directed by	Written by	Original release date	Prod. code
49	1	"UFO Captives"	Unknown	Deborah Blum	September 14, 1978	768
UFO Captives: Meet people who believe they have been held captive aboard alien spacecraft - close encounters of the fourth kind.
50	2	"Tornadoes"	Unknown	Robert Fiveson	September 21, 1978	772
Tornadoes: A terrifying look at one of nature's deadliest forces. Tornadoes can swallow up buildings and people without a trace - can they be stopped?
51	3	"Cloning"	Unknown	Unknown	September 28, 1978	771
Cloning: An in-depth look at the process which may allow us to "copy" people exactly and produce single-parent human beings.
52	4	"Water Seekers"	Unknown	J. Francis Hitching	October 5, 1978	777
Water Seekers: Scientists take another look at the divining rod. Does water emit valuable signals?
53	5	"Jack the Ripper"	Unknown	Barbara Wegher	October 12, 1978	763
Jack the Ripper: An investigative report on the unsolved mystery of London's notorious serial killer. The episode reveals the killer's connection with contemporary media and the possible involvement with the Ancient Free And Accepted Masons. Various identities are suggested as being that of the killer, including a duke who was second in line to the British throne.
54	6	"Cryogenics"	Unknown	Philip Dauber	October 19, 1978	765
Cryonics (mistakenly called Cryogenics): Scientists are discovering new methods to prolong human life and, in the case of cryogenics, to suspend the possibility of life for centuries.
55	7	"Siberian Fireball"	Unknown	Barbara Wegher	October 26, 1978	767
Siberian Fireball: Considers the possibility that the unexplained and catastrophic explosion in Siberia in 1908 was an atomic blast occurring 37 years before the development of the A-bomb.
56	8	"The Great Lakes Triangle"	Unknown	Donald Brittain	November 2, 1978	774
The Great Lakes Triangle: Investigates efforts by scientists and psychics to discover the mysterious forces around the Great Lakes that have caused more air and sea disasters than the Bermuda Triangle.
57	9	"Monster Hunters"	Unknown	Nicholas Webster	November 9, 1978	770
Monster Hunters: Leonard Nimoy investigates what compels scientists and teachers to pursue a man-like beast in Northern California.
58	10	"Bermuda Triangle Pirates"	Unknown	Donald Brittain	December 7, 1978	775
Bermuda Triangle Pirates: Luxurious yachts are disappearing off the coast of Florida. Are pirates trafficking in drugs to blame?
59	11	"Indian Astronomers"	Unknown	Lynne Reggiardo Hill	December 14, 1978	TBA
Indian Astronomers: Recent excavations in Southern Illinois provide tantalizing glimpses at Native American use of astronomy.
60	12	"Sherlock Holmes"	Unknown	J. Francis Hitching	December 21, 1978	779
Sherlock Holmes: A look at surprising new clues which indicate that the famed super sleuth actually did exist, after a fashion.
61	13	"Lost Vikings"	Unknown	Joel Ziskin	December 28, 1978	TBA
Lost Vikings: The story of Viking Erik the Red's descendants, who left Scandinavia and arrived in Northern Canada centuries before Columbus.
62	14	"Dreams and Nightmares"	Unknown	Philip Dauber	January 4, 1979	766
Dreams and Nightmares: Our dreams provide clues to the dark world of our unconscious mind, but can we learn to control them?
63	15	"Animal ESP"	Unknown	Glenn Winters and Karen Cole Winters	January 11, 1979	786
Animal ESP: Dramatic scenes attempt to demonstrate that close communication between people and their pets may be due to more than emotional bonds.
64	16	"The Money Pit Mystery"	Unknown	Seth Hill	January 18, 1979	776
The Money Pit Mystery: A true tale of hidden treasure and mysterious death. Six people have died in the scramble to dig up the Oak Island treasures, supposedly buried by Captain Kidd.
65	17	"Psychic Sea Hunt"	Unknown	David Eugene Watson	January 25, 1979	784
Psychic Sea Hunt: A team of psychics gives scientists the exact description and location of an unknown shipwreck, and a submarine hunt proves them right.
66	18	"The Angel of Death"	Unknown	Abraham Lewenstein	February 1, 1979	782
Angel of Death: Nazi hunter Simon Wiesenthal tracks infamous war criminal Josef Mengele to his hiding place in Paraguay. Mengele is believed to have died only six days after this episode was broadcast, having drowned as a result of a stroke while swimming. At the time of his death, his identity was not widely known. Years after this installment was initially transmitted, Mengele's remains were found and identified; he proved to have had to eke out a bare existence as a farm worker, and his punishment for his war crimes was to have lived out the rest of his days in both comparative obscurity and the fear of eventual discovery.
67	19	"Noah's Flood"	Unknown	Seth Hill	February 8, 1979	783
Noah's Flood: A dramatic inquiry into whether or not scientific proof exists for the legend of the Biblical Great Flood.
68	20	"The Diamond Curse"	Unknown	Lynne Reggiardo Hill	February 15, 1979	787
The Diamond Curse: Why do mystery and tragedy plague the owners of great gems like the Hope Diamond?
69	21	"Ghostly Stakeout"	Unknown	Deborah Blum	February 22, 1979	789
Ghostly Stakeout: In a haunted house, a psychic team contacts troubled spirits that live on after death.
70	22	"Brain Power"	Unknown	Barbara Wegher	March 17, 1979	790
Brain Power: A study of the incredible hidden potential of the human mind, including the possibility that average people can become geniuses.
71	23	"Sodom & Gomorrah"	Unknown	Joel Ziskin	May 10, 1979	764
Sodom and Gomorrah: Studies evidence developed by archaeologists suggesting that the two wicked cities existed on the site of a crater now filled in by the Dead Sea.
72	24	"King Tut"	Unknown	Barbara Wegher	May 17, 1979	780
King Tut: Investigates the ancient Egyptian monarch's final days. Was he a beloved leader who died a natural death or did court intrigues lead to his assassination? Years after this installment was transmitted, Egyptological historians became convinced that Tutankhamun was in atrocious health for almost his entire life due to birth deformities. These historians came to believe that his birth deformities resulted from inbreeding within the Pharaoh's family.

==== Season 4 (1979–1980) ====
No. overall	No. in season	Title	Directed by	Written by	Original release date	Prod. code
73	1	"Tidal Waves"	Unknown	David Frank	September 20, 1979	830
Tidal Waves: See a reenactment of the incredible destruction wrought by the tsunami (giant sea wave) that struck Hawaii in 1960.
74	2	"Carlos, the Most Wanted Man in the World"	Unknown	Don North	September 27, 1979	847
Carlos, The World's Most Wanted Man: A chilling profile of the playboy-turned-terrorist called Carlos the Jackal, who was called "The World's Most Wanted Man." In 1994, Carlos was given up to French intelligence by the Government of Sudan, was charged and subsequently convicted of murder of an informant and is serving a life term in prison, which was lengthened with an additional life term for a terrorist attack on French soil.
75	3	"The Amityville Horror"	Unknown	Seth Hill	October 4, 1979	831
The Amityville Horror: A dream house in a lovely suburb becomes a nightmare when the owners discover an evil presence. The house was the site of a family massacre in 1974, which would inspire the 1979 movie and its 2005 remake.
76	4	"UFO Australia"	Unknown	Barbara Wegher	October 11, 1979	836
UFO Australia: Actual film footage of unidentified flying objects flying Down Under. Includes interview with New Zealand pilot and author Bruce Cathie.
77	5	"Immortal Sharks"	Unknown	Barbara Wegher	October 18, 1979	837
Immortal Sharks: Why has the great white shark not evolved as other animals have? Leonard Nimoy hosts this look at this most ancient and primitive creature.
78	6	"The Lost Colony of Roanoke"	Unknown	Nicholas and Diana Webster	October 25, 1979	834
The Lost Colony of Roanoke: A look at new evidence which offers an intriguing theory about where the colonists went.
79	7	"The Shroud of Turin"	Unknown	Seth Hill	November 8, 1979	825
The Shroud of Turin: An in-depth examination of the famed cloth that many believe holds the image of Jesus Christ.
80	8	"Mexican Pyramids"	Unknown	Philip Dauber	November 15, 1979	838
Mexican Pyramids: The bloody story of the great pyramids, which were used for daily human sacrifices.
81	9	"The Abominable Snowman"	Unknown	Loren Coleman	November 22, 1979	832
The Abominable Snowman: Leonard Nimoy examines the experiences of the explorers who say they have actually sighted the legendary creature.
82	10	"Pompeii"	TBD	Seth Hill	November 1979	TBA
Pompeii: This great Roman city was a wealthy resort and mecca for fun-lovers before it was destroyed by the eruption of Mount Vesuvius. Were early Christians among the Roman revelers?
83	11	"D.B. Cooper"	Unknown	Alan Landsburg and Barbara Wegher	December 6, 1979	850
D. B. Cooper: The incredible story of the man who hijacked a jetliner, parachuted out with his loot, and was never seen again.
84	12	"The Ten Commandments"	Unknown	Unknown	December 13, 1979	843
The Ten Commandments: Leonard Nimoy profiles Moses and tries to pinpoint Mount Sinai's exact location. Have pilgrims to the Holy Land been praying at the wrong location?
85	13	"The Dark Star"	Unknown	Tamara Lucier-Green	December 20, 1979	848
The Dark Star: Travel to Africa to find out why the Dogon, a primitive tribe, knows so much about astronomy, a black hole, and travelers from outer space.
86	14	"The San Andreas Fault"	Unknown	Philip Dauber	December 27, 1979	840
The San Andreas Fault: Analyzes California's great earthquake fault line to determine whether the long-predicted catastrophic quake can be predicted.
87	15	"The Missing Heir"	Unknown	Barbara Wegher	January 3, 1980	842
The Missing Heirs: There is still a $3.2 million fortune that remains unclaimed after a century. To whom does it belong?
88	16	"Vincent Van Gogh"	Unknown	Leonard Nimoy	January 10, 1980	849
Van Gogh: A look at the life and death of the great Dutch master—was he really mad? Host Leonard Nimoy, who wrote this installment partially to promote his one-man show Vincent, contends that he was not.
89	17	"Wild Children"	Unknown	J. Francis Hitching	January 17, 1980	826
Wild Children: Can these children survive in civilization? Leonard Nimoy examines several historical cases.
90	18	"The Ghost Ship"	Unknown	J. Francis Hitching	January 24, 1980	827
The Ghost Ship: In 1872, the captain and crew of the Mary Celeste vanished without a trace. The sails were set to the wind and breakfast was on the table. Who or what possessed the ship?
91	19	"Earth Visitors"	Unknown	Peter Matulavich	January 31, 1980	844
Earth Visitors: Were our earliest ancestors travelers from other planets?
92	20	"John the Baptist"	Unknown	Seth Hill	February 7, 1980	841
John the Baptist: An investigation to determine whether the great holy man's remains are in Europe or Egypt.
93	21	"Air Disaster Prediction"	Unknown	Glenn and Karen Winters	February 14, 1980	829
Air Disaster Predictions: A study of reports that major air crashes have been seen or predicted beforehand in nightmares. Includes the 1979 crash of American Airlines Flight 191.
94	22	"The Bimini Wall"	Unknown	Barbara Wegher	February 21, 1980	851
The Bimini Wall: The saga of the giant stones found at the bottom of the Caribbean. Leonard Nimoy probes whether they might be part of the ancient, supposedly mythical, empire of Atlantis.
95	23	"Glenn Miller"	Unknown	Greg Goldman	March 7, 1980	845
Glenn Miller: An inquiry into why the mysterious death—or disappearance—of the great musician was never investigated, and a possible military cover-up.
96	24	"Past Lives"	Unknown	Mark Grossan and Vicky Riley	March 14, 1980	833
Past Lives: Can reincarnation be proved? Leonard Nimoy examines the data, testimony, and theories.

==== Season 5 (1980–1981) ====
No. overall	No. in season	Title	Directed by	Written by	Original release date	Prod. code
97	1	"UFO Coverups"	Unknown	Deborah Blum and Seth Hill	September 20, 1980	856
UFO Cover-Ups: Examines charges that the U.S. Air Force is hiding alien corpses and the remains of crashed spacecraft in Hangar 18 of Wright-Patterson Air Force Base in Ohio. NOTE: This was one of the first nationally broadcast programs to discuss the so-called Roswell Incident.
98	2	"Faith Healing"	Unknown	Lisa Demberg	September 27, 1980	852
Faith Healing: Is faith healing a hoax or holistic medicine?
99	3	"Lee Harvey Oswald"	Unknown	Peter Matulavich	October 4, 1980	854
Lee Harvey Oswald: The assassination of John F. Kennedy: was there visual proof of two guns in Dallas and possibly two Oswalds?
100	4	"Daredevil Death Wish"	Unknown	Robert Fiveson	October 11, 1980	859
Daredevil Death Wish: A look at some of the dangerous stunts daredevils attempt, and why they keep trying even after suffering near-fatal injuries. This reflected and echoed one of the That's Incredible! segments, "Incredibly Dangerous," which itself became embroiled in controversy when some of the stuntmen/daredevils it featured were injured severely enough to ruin their careers as such.
101	5	"Life After Life"	Unknown	Diana Webster and Barbara Wegher	October 18, 1980	855
Life after Life: The stories of people who claim they have had after-life experiences and say they no longer fear death.
102	6	"Moon Madness"	Unknown	Seth Hill	October 25, 1980	853
Moon Madness: Violence and passion are said to be commonplace when the Moon is full. Is there any truth to the Werewolf legends? Leonard Nimoy hosts this historical look at lunacy.
103	7	"Dangerous Volcanoes"	Unknown	Annette Bettin and John Ackelson	November 1, 1980	868
Dangerous Volcanoes: Scientists wonder whether California's Mount Shasta, Washington's Mount St. Helens, and other American volcanoes will soon erupt again.
104	8	"The Lindbergh Kidnapping"	Unknown	Alex Pomasanoff	November 8, 1980	864
The Lindbergh Kidnapping: Digs for the facts behind the controversy that still rages today, the kidnapping of Charles Lindbergh's baby. Was the wrong man executed for the crime?
105	9	"Acupuncture"	Unknown	Nicholas and Diana Webster	November 15, 1980	870
Acupuncture: A study of the healing technique which may cure incurable diseases. Leonard Nimoy investigates the power of the ancient Chinese healing art.
106	10	"Jimmy Hoffa"	Unknown	Philip Dauber	November 22, 1980	862
Jimmy Hoffa: A probe into the disappearance of James Riddle Hoffa, the mob-connected President of the International Brotherhood of Teamsters. Was he killed, kidnapped, or did he go underground?
107	11	"Fountain of Youth"	Unknown	Robert Fiveson	November 29, 1980	TBA
The Fountain of Youth: A look at the various scientific ways people use to stay young for years longer.
108	12	"Laugh Therapy"	Unknown	Robert Fiveson	December 6, 1980	858
Laugh Therapy: Can laughter combat disease? A Nobel Prize winner says he cured himself after doctors gave up hope.
109	13	"Salem Witches"	Unknown	Rob Blumenstein	December 13, 1980	865
Salem Witches: Are the witches of Salem still casting spells in Massachusetts?
110	14	"Super Children"	Unknown	Barbara Wegher	December 27, 1980	867
Super Children: Investigates scientific efforts to produce a generation of child prodigies; are they born or made?
111	15	"The Great Wall of China"	Unknown	Nicholas and Diana Webster	January 10, 1981	869
The Great Wall of China: The story of one of the world's greatest wonders - who built it and why?
112	16	"The Castle of Secrets"	Unknown	Seth Hill	January 24, 1981	876
The Castle of Secrets: The saga of the Coral Castle, built by Edward Leedskalnin, a frail hermit who allegedly carved and lifted 1,100 tons of solid stone blocks weighing up to 30 tons each using the secrets of Atlantis.
113	17	"The Great Lovers"	Unknown	Leonard Nimoy	January 31, 1981	878
The Great Lovers: A look at some of history's famous lovers. What drove certain men to pursue sensual pleasure above all else? The program compares the legends of Don Juan and Casanova. Host Leonard Nimoy wrote this installment.
114	18	"The Holy Grail"	Unknown	Seth Hill	February 7, 1981	879
The Holy Grail: Explores the claims that the chalice used by Jesus at the Last Supper may have been found.
115	19	"The Death of Marilyn Monroe"	Unknown	Abraham Lewenstein, Annette Bettin, and Jon Ackelson	February 14, 1981	860
The Death of Marilyn Monroe: Examines evidence that suggests that the Hollywood star may not have committed suicide.
116	20	"Chinese Explorers"	Unknown	Nicholas and Diana Webster	February 21, 1981	871
Chinese Explorers: Did the Chinese discover America 1,000 years before Columbus? Leonard Nimoy explores claims that a Buddhist monk named Hu-Shen arrived on the American continent in AD 458.
117	21	"The Hindenburg Mystery"	Unknown	Robin Crichton	February 21, 1981	873
The Hindenburg Mystery: A probe into the theory alleging that the famed Nazi lighter-than-air ship, which exploded while landing at Lakehurst, New Jersey, in 1937, was destroyed by political saboteurs.
118	22	"The End of the World"	Unknown	Marta Houske	April 30, 1981	877
The End of the World: Will an asteroid or comet on a collision course with Earth end it all?
119	23	"The Lusitania"	Unknown	J. Francis Hitching	May 16, 1981	874
The Lusitania: An in-depth examination into the sinking of the British liner by a German submarine in 1915, killing over 1,000 passengers, including 114 Americans. Was it really all part of a plot to involve the U.S. in World War I?
120	24	"Sun Worshippers"	Unknown	Sharron Miller	May 19, 1981	866
Sun Worshippers: Will solar energy free us from dependence on foreign oil? Leonard Nimoy analyzes how solar energy stacks up against fossil fuel and nuclear energy.

==== Season 6 (1981–1982) ====
No. overall	No. in season	Title	Directed by	Written by	Original release date	Prod. code
121	1	"Jesse James"	Unknown	Barbara Wegher	September 21, 1981	913
Jesse James: Probes one of the most intriguing questions of the Old West—was legendary gunman Jesse James shot in the back, or did he escape capture and live to a ripe old age?
122	2	"Biofeedback"	Unknown	Philip Dauber	September 28, 1981	901
Biofeedback: A revealing study of how computers are now healing the sick and building sports champions.
123	3	"Ghosts in Photography"	Unknown	Stephen Peck	October 5, 1981	915
Ghosts in Photography: Is it possible to photograph the dead?
124	4	"M.I.A.'s"	Jon Ackelson	Annette Bettin and Jon Ackelson	October 12, 1981	914
M.I.A.s: An investigation into a highly controversial and emotional question: Are American servicemen still lingering in prison in Vietnam?
125	5	"The Elephant Man"	Nicholas Webster	Nicholas and Diana Webster	October 19, 1981	912
The Elephant Man: From side-show freak to the friend of royalty, review the true story of the horribly disfigured Joseph Merrick.
126	6	"The Lincoln Conspiracy"	Jon Ackelson	Jon Ackelson and Annette Bettin	October 26, 1981	907
The Lincoln Conspiracy: Cracks "the case of the 19th century"—how the assassination of Abraham Lincoln was meticulously planned and abominably executed.
127	7	"Jim Jones"	Philip Dauber	Philip Dauber	October 31, 1981	908
Jim Jones: The story that shocked the world—how Jim Jones, the cult Svengali from California, convinced over 900 of his followers to follow him—first to a commune in Guyana and then into suicide.
128	8	"King Solomon's Mines"	Robin Crichton	Robin Crichton	November 2, 1981	920
King Solomon's Mines: A look at one of the most exciting searches of all—the hunt for the riches of the Old Testament. Did King Solomon actually have a mine near Mount Sinai?
129	9	"The Tower of London Murders"	Nicholas Webster	Diana and Nicholas Webster	November 9, 1981	903
The Tower of London Murders: How the destiny of England was changed by the disappearance of young princes from the fabled Tower. Were they murdered on the orders of their uncle, Richard III of England?
130	10	"The Aztec Conquest"	Stephen Peck	Stephen Peck	November 16, 1981	922
The Aztec Conquest: Why did the great Montezuma surrender to Cortes without fighting? What part did Aztec legend about a bearded white god play in the ultimate downfall of the Aztec Empire?
131	11	"Houdini's Secrets"	Glenn Winters	Glenn and Karen Winters	November 21, 1981	916
Houdini's Secrets: Probes the still-mysterious secrets of the world's greatest escape artist, including the theory that Houdini came back after death.
132	12	"Hiroshima Survivors"	Peter Matulavich	Peter Matulavich	November 23, 1981	904
Hiroshima Survivors: A revealing study of the wounds suffered by survivors of the first A-bomb blast, which killed more than 80,000 Japanese civilians on August 6, 1945.
133	13	"The Titanic"	J. Francis Hitching	J. Francis Hitching	November 30, 1981	918
Titanic: Investigates the most perplexing question about the 1912 North Atlantic disaster that cost 1,496 lives: Why did the captain ignore the ice warnings and speed on into oblivion?
134	14	"Future Life"	Greg Goldman	Greg Goldman	December 6, 1981	923
Future Life: What might the world be like for our children?
135	15	"Nostradamus"	J. Francis Hitching	J. Francis Hitching	December 13, 1981	911
Nostradamus: Examines the life of Nostradamus and his predictions.
136	16	"Spirit Voices"	John Dabney	John Dabney	December 20, 1981	925
Spirit Voices: Do loved ones call back to us from their next lives? Leonard Nimoy examines historical claims of voices from the beyond, as well as scientific research into the possibility of spirit voices.
137	17	"The Human Aura"	Seth Hill	Seth Hill	January 3, 1982	910
The Human Aura: A look at the multi-colored rays we transmit, which seem to change with our moods.
138	18	"The Missing Link"	Seth Hill	Seth Hill	January 17, 1982	921
The Missing Link: Delves into one of the most intriguing questions of all—which side is right, science or creationists?
139	19	"Time & Space Travel"	John Dabney	John Dabney	January 24, 1982	924
Time and Space Travel: Is it possible to travel through space faster than the speed of light and avoid aging?
140	20	"Eva Braun"	Nicholas Webster	Diana and Nicholas Webster	February 1, 1982	927
Eva Braun: Explores the possibility that Adolf Hitler's wife may not have died with him down in the bunker in April 1945. This episode features British historians David Irving and Hugh Trevor-Roper.
141	21	"The Walls of Jericho"	Robin Crichton	Robin Crichton	February 8, 1982	919
The Walls of Jericho: The great Biblical saga is examined for evidence that the walls really did tumble down for Joshua.
142	22	"Bishop Pike"	Glenn Winters	Glenn and Karen Winters	February 15, 1982	917
Bishop Pike: Was Bishop James Pike a minister, a martyr, or a madman?
143	23	"The Ultimate Disaster"	Jon Ackelson	Annette Bettin and Jon Ackelson	February 22, 1982	926
Ultimate Disaster: Delves into the ultimate question—how will life on this planet perish?
144	24	"Life Before Birth"	Nancy Kendall	Andy White	March 1, 1982	928
Life Before Birth: Is an unborn baby aware of the world around him?

=== Sci-Fi Channel revival (2002) ===
A revival of the series aired on The Sci-Fi Channel for one season, hosted by Mitch Pileggi.

No. overall	No. in season	Title	Directed by	Written by	Original release date	Prod. code
145	1	"Hell/Vampires/The Tesla Death Ray/Scandinavian Lake Monsters"	Unknown	Unknown	October 4, 2002	1803
146	2	"Witchcraft/The Man Eaters of Tsavo/The Alien Menace/Ghost Hitchhikers"	Unknown	Unknown	October 11, 2002	1806
147	3	"Werewolves/The Curse of The Mummy/D.B. Cooper Deathbed Confession/Reincarnation"	Unknown	Unknown	October 18, 2002	1805
148	4	"The Ghosts in Bobby Mackey's Bar/Stigmata/The Haunted Hornet/Zombies"	Unknown	Unknown	October 25, 2002	1801
149	5	"The Catacomb Mummies/The Johnson Bigfoot Encounter/The Secret of Rennes-le-Château/Earthquake Predictions"	Unknown	Unknown	November 1, 2002	1802
150	6	"Haunted Plantations/The Doomsday Virus/The Devil/Psychic Spies"	Unknown	Unknown	November 8, 2002	1804
151	7	"Ghost Lovers/Exorcism & Possession/Robot Armageddon/The Haunted Campus of Ohio University"	Unknown	Unknown	November 15, 2002	1807
152	8	"Faith Healers/The Real Frankenstein/The Shroud of Turin/Alien Ancestors"	Unknown	Unknown	November 22, 2002	1808

=== History Channel revival (2018–2019) ===
A second revival of the series aired on The History Channel for two seasons, hosted by Zachary Quinto.

==== Season 1 (2018) ====
No. overall	No. in season	Title	Directed by	Written by	Original release date	Prod. code
153	1	"Aliens"	Unknown	Unknown	July 20, 2018	1001
Quinto sets out to discover whether aliens exist and what evidence we have to prove it. He meets with several people who say they have encountered extra-terrestrial life; a man who claims to have been abducted by aliens several times since childhood; a man who claims to have extracted an alien implant; and a woman who shows Zachary what it feels like to be abducted into a spacecraft. Zachary also meets with the world's leading scientists at SETI in Green Banks, West Virginia. There, utilizing the world's largest telescope, they show him the methods they employ to communicate with potential other-worldly visitors and what this research has taught them about a mysterious radio signal they picked up 3 billion light years away.
154	2	"SuperHuman"	Unknown	Unknown	July 27, 2018	1002
Quinto wants to understand how one can have superhuman abilities of strength, pain, and endurance. He meets a man who bent the metal frame of a car door with his bare hands in a moment of crisis, and a man who can feel no pain. He also meets with a Shaolin warrior monk who shows him some of the secrets to his training as he demonstrates breaking a wooden staff over his own head. Zachary learns to harness superhuman powers of his own through demonstrations by the monk, who in turn teaches Zachary how to break the staff as well.
155	3	"Monsters of the Deep"	Unknown	Unknown	August 3, 2018	1003
Quinto sets out to research the strangest creatures from the depths of the ocean and to see how much they resemble monsters that are depicted in myth and legend. Starting in Australia, he meets with a teenager who was savagely attacked by a swarm of mysterious flesh-eating monsters, only to jump into the water himself the next day among highly venomous sea creatures. From the carnivorous fish of American rivers to the eyeless monsters of the Atlantic Ocean, Zachary finds some merit in these old monster stories.
156	4	"Artificial Intelligence"	Unknown	Unknown	August 10, 2018	1004
Quinto embarks on a journey to understand how the future of artificial intelligence may already be a threat to humanity. He visits Facebook headquarters where he learns about a failed AI experiment when two chat boxes created a language that only they could understand. Zachary also gets a firsthand look at the world's latest technology–including life-like dolls programmed with advanced AI, robots that learn and communicate, highly intelligent drones of war, and Uber self-driving cars.
157	5	"Time Travel"	Unknown	Unknown	August 17, 2018	1005
Quinto charts a journey to determine whether time travel is possible. He meets a man who claims to have traveled back in time due to a secret government program and a group of people living in Liverpool known as "time slippers". Zachary then makes a visit to the CERN headquarters in Geneva, where he attempts to understand the origins of the universe and the dimension of time. Equipped with this new knowledge, Zachary tests his own perception of time with an elaborate skydiving experiment to see if he can slow down time itself.
158	6	"Sinkholes"	Unknown	Unknown	August 24, 2018	1006
Quinto explores the unpredictable phenomenon of sinkholes to determine just what causes them. He visits a Florida man whose brother was killed when their family home was literally swallowed whole by earth. He also visits a series of caves that are forming right below the houses of a quaint suburban neighborhood.
159	7	"Mind Control"	Unknown	Unknown	August 31, 2018	1007
Quinto explores the dark world of psychological mind control. He meets with a person who claims that they were surgically implanted with an electronic harassment device in his head and neck. He continues his search by examining the recent sonic attacks on American diplomats in Cuba and listens to the sound of an actual sonic weapon. In the end, he agrees to give up total control of his mind in a showdown with a mentalist.
160	8	"Life After Death"	Unknown	Unknown	September 7, 2018	1008
Quinto tackles the ultimate existential question as he explores what happens when we die and whether or not we can have life after death. He meets with a Texas man who actually died and came back to life after a kayaking accident. He continues his search by attempting to speak with spirits from beyond the grave with the help of a paranormal investigator who claims to possess audio and video communication with his deceased daughter. He also looks at the strange world of cryogenics at Alcor laboratories in Arizona, and uncovers a research on an anti-aging pill at Harvard University.
161	9	"Atlantis Part 1"	Unknown	Unknown	September 14, 2018	1009
Using a checklist derived from Plato's ancient writing as his guide, Quinto begins a journey to find the lost civilization of Atlantis and prove that it was a real empire. He begins in Greece where he dives deep into the heart of the Mediterranean Sea, looking for signs of Atlantis amongst the relics of a sunken settlement. His journey leads him to the Palace of Knossos on Crete, where he finds many alleged similarities between Atlantis and the mysterious Minoan civilization. Ultimately, he lands on the island of Sardinia, where he uncovers even more connections to Plato's checklist and possible evidence of an advanced ancient alphabet.
162	10	"Atlantis Part 2"	Unknown	Unknown	September 14, 2018	1010
Quinto continues his quest to find the lost civilization of Atlantis and prove that it was a real and thriving empire. On the island of Sardinia, he uncovers even more compelling evidence of an advanced civilization matching Plato's description of Atlantis -- both inside a dark cave and amongst ancient circular ruins. He then shifts his search, looking for clues about the descendants of Atlantis and their connection to the rare RH negative blood type. This ultimately leads him to a new location in Morocco, where he uncovers more connections to Plato's checklist than anywhere else he has encountered on his search.

==== Season 2 (2019) ====
No. overall	No. in season	Title	Directed by	Written by	Original release date	Prod. code
163	1	"The Loch Ness Monster Part 1"	Unknown	Unknown	October 4, 2019	2001
164	2	"The Loch Ness Monster Part 2"	Unknown	Unknown	October 11, 2019	2002
165	3	"The Lost Colony of Roanoke"	Unknown	Unknown	October 18, 2019	2003
166	4	"Secrets of the Bible"	Unknown	Unknown	November 1, 2019	2004
167	5	"The Bermuda Triangle"	Unknown	Unknown	November 8, 2019	2005
168	6	"Nazi Secrets"	Unknown	Unknown	November 15, 2019	2006
169	7	"UFOs"	Unknown	Unknown	November 22, 2019	2007
170	8	"The End of the World"	Unknown	Unknown	November 29, 2019	2008

== Home media releases ==
In February 2012, it was announced that Visual Entertainment, under license from Universal Studios, had acquired the home video rights to the original series for the United States and Canada. In Search of: The Complete Collection was released in Canada and the U.S. on December 11, 2012, from VEI's website.

The 21-DVD set includes all 144 installments hosted by Leonard Nimoy. Also included are two Rod Serling specials: In Search of Ancient Astronauts and In Search of Ancient Mysteries, which aired prior to the start of the regular Nimoy series. Three Landsburg specials The Outer Space Connection (1975), Secrets of the Bermuda Triangle (1978), and Manbeast! Myth or Monster (1978), are not included. VEI also included all eight episodes of the short-lived 2002 series hosted by Mitch Pileggi.

== Homages ==
The style of the original In Search of... has been paid homage to and parodied by many productions. Examples include Mysteries in History, a show-within-a-show that plays a part in the plotline to Men in Black II (the faux series is hosted by Peter Graves in the film; coincidentally, Graves once co-starred with Nimoy in Mission: Impossible). Two other examples are Truth from Legend and Fact from Myth, two nearly identical series existing in alternate universes for which "mini-episodes" were created for YouTube as part of the viral marketing campaign for the two-part video game BioShock Infinite: Burial at Sea. The series also served as inspiration for The Blair Witch Project, whose directors Eduardo Sánchez and Daniel Myrick watched the show as children.

== See also ==
Other series using a similar title:

- In Search of Aliens
- In Search of the Dark Ages
- In Search of the Trojan War
