= Gail Burwen =

Underground comix artist and book illustrator

- Born: December 14, 1945; Cambridge, Massachusetts, US
- Died: June 17, 2017 (aged 71); Somersworth, New Hampshire, US
- Education: Danvers High School Class of 1963; Massachusetts College of Art and Design
- Known for: Illustration
- Movement: Underground comix

Gail Burwen (December 14, 1945–June 17, 2017) was an American illustrator best known for her work in underground comix and the science fiction genre of the 1970s. She illustrated the original cover of the controversial plant perception book The Secret Life of Plants published in 1973.

== Biography ==
Gail Burwen was born on December 14, 1945, in Cambridge, Massachusetts. She was the oldest of five children, the only daughter born to Robert and June Burwen. As a teenager she was a member of the National Honor Society and was credited with writing the school song. She graduated from Danvers High School in 1963, enrolling in the Massachusetts College of Art and Design shortly after. While studying at MCAD in 1966 Gail became the editor of the student newspaper.

On June 17, 2017, Gail Burwen's died at the age of 71 in a fatal hit-and-run accident as she walked outside of her home in Somersworth, New Hampshire. The driver hid out for 4 days before being caught and arrested, served 6 months without remorse.

== Career ==
Gail Burwen served as an early art director for National Lampoon magazine in addition to providing them with numerous comics and illustrations. Her illustrations are mentioned in the 2010 book Drunk Stoned Brilliant Dead: The Writers and Artists Who Made the National Lampoon Insanely Great written by Rick Meyerowitz. In 1969, Burwen illustrated two record album covers: The Astral Projection by The Astral Scene and Classical Smoke by The Kasenetz-Katz Orchestral Cirkus.

=== Underground comix ===
In 1967, Gail co-founded Cloud Studios in New York City with Peter Bramley and Bill Skurski. The studio offered underground printing and design services for a variety of clients including those involved in theater in addition to creating comix of their own like Drool Magazine and Cloud Comix. The studio was well known for its surrealist, satirical art, montage novellas, and photographic comic strips known as fumettis. For several years until 1972, Gail provided scripts, sketches, lettering, and inking for many of their comics. She is credited as one of the artists of the cover of the first issue of Cloud Comix published by Kitchen Sink Press. A collection of the "best and worst underground comix" written by Bill Sherman was published in the 44th issue of The Comics Journal in 1979. The following was said in regards to Cloud Comix #2:

"Cloud Studios (Bramley, Bill Skurski, Ned Sonntag, and others) did several comix in addition to working for several humor mags, but they never matched this issue for tightness. Jay Kinney's sorority satire seems even funnier after Animal House. Best Piece: Gail Burwen's (what ever happened to Gail Burwen?) City Slicker Bob teaming with Fred Astaire to produce a musical salute to the 70s Depression. ("So even if they/Stop welfare/Cut food stamps/Repeal abortion/Close the ibraries/You gotta dance!")"

— Bill Sherman, "Only Lines on Paper...", The Comics Journal #44

Burwen's "Manhattan Madness: City Slicker Bob" sequence was given a five-page special feature in Apple Pie #1, published by Lopez in March 1975.

A selection of Gail Burwen's work in underground comix includes the following:

- National Lampoon: Blight, June 1970.
- National Lampoon, July 1970.
- Cloud Comix #1, Kitchen Sink Press, June 1971.
- Cloud Comix #2, Head Imports, 1972.
- Drool Magazine #1, Company & Sons, 1972.
- Apple Pie #1, Lopez, March 1975.

=== Book covers ===
Burwen illustrated dozens of book covers in the 1970s, primarily in the science fiction genre. In addition to design, Gail also handled the typography for most of her covers, utilizing classic science fiction typefaces like Mierop Ginger Snap, Airport Black, and Davison Arabesque. One of her more notable covers was for The Secret Life of Plants by Peter Tompkins and Christopher Bird published in 1973. The book caused immediate controversy amidst scientists for claiming, among other things, that the authors had discovered proof of plant sentience. The Secret Life of Plants became a documentary film that was eventually released as Journey Through "The Secret Life of Plants" with an accompanying soundtrack by Stevie Wonder in 1978.

A selection of Gail Burwen's dust jacket and book cover illustration credits:

- The Spell of Seven, L. Sprague de Camp, Pyramid Books, 1969.
  - Also published in Swedish as Skriket, B. Wahlstrom, 1975.
- The Singing Citadel, Michael Moorcock, Berkley Medallion, 1970.
- Futures to Infinity, ed. Sam Moskowitz, Pyramid Books, 1970.
- The Dreaming Earth, John Brunner, Pyramid Books, 1970.
- Other Worlds, Other Seas: Science-Fiction Stories from Socialist Countries, ed. Darko Suvin, Random House, 1970.
- Destiny Doll, Clifford D. Simak, Putnam, 1971.
- ...And All the Stars a Stage, James Blish, Doubleday, 1971.
- Dance Hall of The Dead, Tony Hillerman, Harper & Row, 1973.
- The Secret Life of Plants, Peter Tompkins and Christopher Bird, Harper & Row, 1973.
- The Tanelorn Archives: A Primary and Secondary Bibliography of The Works of Michael Moorcock 1949-1979, Richard Bilyeu, Pandora's Books, 1981.
