= Maurizio Giglio =

Italian soldier and policeman (1920–1944)

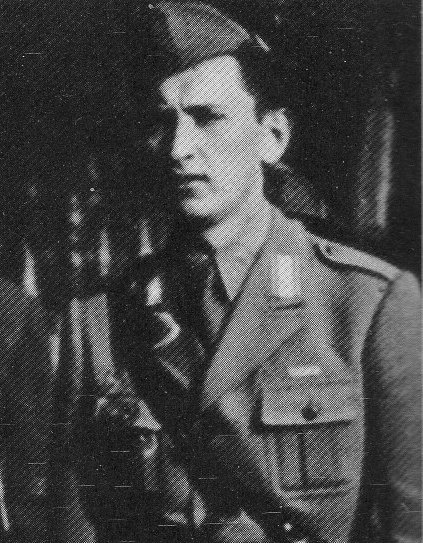
- Born: 20 December 1920; Paris, France
- Died: 24 March 1944 (aged 23); Rome, Italy
- Burial place: Fosse Ardeatine; 41°51′24″N 12°30′37″E
- Military career
- Allegiance: Kingdom of Italy
- Branch: Royal Italian Army
- Service years: 1940–1944
- Rank: Lieutenant
- Unit: 81st Infantry Regiment
- Awards: Gold Medal of Military Valour; Bronze Medal of Military Valor
- Memorials: Caserma Maurizio Giglio, Rome; Via Maurizio Giglio, Rome; Via Maurizio Giglio, Santa Marinella

Maurizio Giglio (20 December 1920 – 24 March 1944) was an Italian soldier and policeman. In September 1943, during World War II, the Italian government concluded an armistice with the Allies. He thereafter transmitted military intelligence by radio from Rome about the Nazi forces there to the Allied forces advancing through southern Italy. In March 1944, he was captured and was executed by the Nazis. He was posthumously awarded the Gold Medal of Military Valour (Italian: Medaglia d'oro al valor militare), a decoration which acknowledges deeds of outstanding gallantry. Places have been named, and memorials dedicated, in his honour.

== Biography ==
=== Early years ===
Giglio was born into a middle-class family in Rome. His parents were Armando and Anna (née Isnard). He had a sister, Giulia Adriani, who outlived him by many years.

Maurizio spent his boyhood between France and Rome. From 1933 to 1938, he studied at the Liceo ginnasio statale Terenzio Mamiani, graduating in law. He was a keen sportsman: hunting, skiing, swimming, mountaineering, and motoring.

=== Secret agent ===
He began a double life. To public eyes - and, most importantly, to German and Italian collaborationist eyes - he was a uniformed police officer. In private, he created a network of informants. These included Giuliano Vassalli and Francesco Malfatti, and Colonel Giuseppe Cordero Lanza di Montezemolo, leader of the Clandestine Military Front (a resistance organisation). A priest helped him by concealing the radio transmitter in his own church. (Note: The identity of the helpful priest is uncertain. One source says that it was Monsignor Nobles of Sant'Agnese in Agone. Another says that it was Monsignor Didier Nobels of San Giuseppe all’Arco di Travertino.) He watched for German troop movements by road and rail, and passed his observations on to the Allies using his radio transmitter (nicknamed "Radio Vittoria", i.e. "Radio Victory"). He helped fugitives from the fascist authorities to escape to the western (Tyrrhenian) coast of Italy, from where they could be rescued by Allied MTBs. (Note: The sources say that fugitives were embarked at Grossetano, but that place is not easy to identify.)

Peter Tompkins was an American undercover OSS agent in Rome. On 21 January 1944 (the day before the Anzio landings), he made contact with Giglio. From then on, they worked closely together and were in almost daily contact. Allied forces were now within 60 km (37 mi) of Rome. Giglio increased his activity, which placed him increasingly at risk. He supplied Tompkins with detailed reports about the police stations of Rome, and about the buildings occupied by the Germans. He arranged meetings in his own house between Tompkins and leaders of the Roman resistance: Giorgio Amendola, Giuliano Vassalli, and Riccardo Bauer. He was able to inform the Allies that the German attack at Cisterna di Latina on 16 February during the Battle of Anzio was only a diversionary attack, in preparation for the real attack to be made two days later at the western end of the Allied position.

On 3–4 February, policemen commanded by Caruso, and the Banda Koch (a gang of fascist thugs commanded by Pietro Koch), raided the Basilica of Saint Paul Outside the Walls.

== Posthumous recognition ==
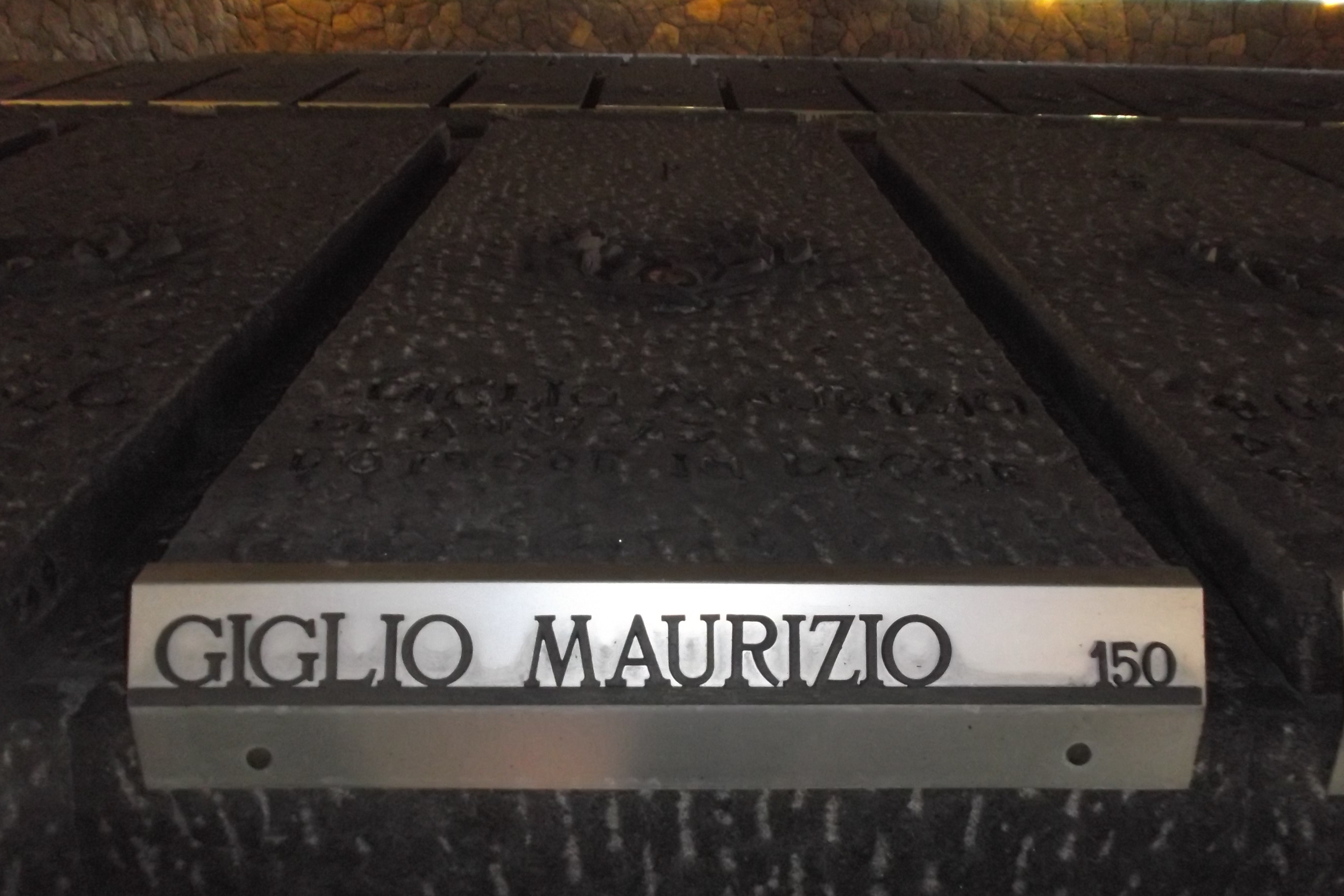
The grave of Maurizio Giglio in the sepulchre of the Ardeatine caves

In 1944, the Gold Medal of Military Valour, an Italian high military decoration, was conferred upon Giglio. The citation reads:

"Si portava alla conclusione dell'armistizio in territorio liberato desideroso di combattere contro i tedeschi. Assunto dal servizio informazioni della 5ª Armata americana dopo un breve periodo di addestramento, ritornava in territorio occupato munito di apparato radiotrasmittente ed, arruolatosi nella polizia della pseudo repubblica sociale, svolgeva intelligente, preziosa opera informativa. Sorpreso mentre eseguiva delle fotografie, fermato e sottoposto ad indagini con sangue freddo ed astuzia riusciva a confondere i suoi avversari ed otteneva la liberazione. Arrestato dai fascisti in seguito ad indicazione strappata al suo radiotelegrafista fu sottoposto a feroci interrogatori e torture senza nulla rivelare sul suo servizio. Veniva poi barbaramente trucidato per rappresaglia, immolando la giovane vita generosamente offerta per la liberazione della Patria dalla oppressione nazifascista — Roma - Fosse Ardeatine, settembre 1943 - 24 marzo 1944."

An English translation:

"After the conclusion of the armistice, he ventured into liberated territory, desirous of continuing to fight against the Germans. He was recruited by the intelligence agency of the Fifth United States Army and, after a brief period of training, returned to occupied territory armed with a radio transmitter, and, in the guise of a policeman of the pretended social republic, carried out invaluable intelligence work. Discovered taking photographs, he was apprehended and questioned, whereupon with coolness and presence of mind he confounded his captors and secured his release. Arrested by the Fascists on the basis of information extracted from his radiotelegraphy operator, he was subjected to savage interrogation and torture without revealing anything about his service. He was then barbarously murdered in a reprisal, extinguishing this young life so generously offered for the liberation of his fatherland from the Nazi-Fascist oppression. — Rome - Ardeatine Caves, September 1943 - 24 March 1944."

There are also tangible memorials. Caserma Maurizio Giglio of the Polizia di Stato in the Roman quarter of Flaminio - in effect, the police headquarters building of Rome. A lecture theatre at the Scuola superiore di polizia, Rome, named after him. Via Maurizio Giglio, a street at the junction of Via Cassia and Via Trionfale, Rome. Via Maurizio Giglio, a street in Santa Marinella, Rome. A memorial plaque in Piazza Navona, near the church of Sant'Agnese in Agone, Rome. A memorial plaque in Largo della Gancia, in the Roman quarter of Della Vittoria.
