= The Secret Life of Plants =

Book by Peter Tompkins and Christopher Bird

- The Secret Life of Plants cover
- Author: Peter Tompkins, Christopher Bird
- Publisher: Harper & Row
- Publication date: 1973
- ISBN: 0-06-091587-0
- OCLC: 19751846

The Secret Life of Plants (1973) is a book by Peter Tompkins and Christopher Bird, which documents controversial experiments that claim to reveal unusual phenomena associated with plants, such as plant sentience and the ability of plants to communicate with other creatures, including humans. The book goes on to discuss philosophies and progressive farming methods based on these "findings".

It was heavily criticized by scientists for promoting pseudoscientific claims. Later editions were published with the subtitle A Fascinating Account of the Physical, Emotional and Spiritual Relations Between Plants and Man.

== Authors ==
Christopher Bird [de] (1928–1996) was a best-selling author who also wrote The Divining Hand: The 500-Year-Old Mystery of Dowsing. Peter Tompkins worked as a journalist, as well as a US military intelligence officer for the OSS in Italy during World War II.

The original book cover design was created by underground comix illustrator Gail Burwen.

== Summary ==
The book includes summaries of the life and work of 20th century scientists Jagadish Chandra Bose and Corentin Louis Kervran as well as 19th century scientist George Washington Carver.

The book includes experiments on plant stimuli using a polygraph, a method which was pioneered by Cleve Backster. Parts of the book attempt to disparage science, particularly plant biology, for example by claiming science is not concerned with "what makes plants live", in order to promote its own viewpoint that plants have emotions. The authors further say the authorities are unable to accept that emotional plants "might originate in a supramaterial world of cosmic beings which, as fairies, elves, gnomes, sylphs, and a host of other creatures, were a matter of direct vision and experience to clairvoyants among the Celts and other sensitives."

== Criticism ==
The book has been criticized by botanists such as Arthur Galston for endorsing pseudoscientific claims. According to Galston and physiologist Clifford L. Slayman many of the claims in the book are false or unsupported by independent verification and replicable studies.

Botanist Leslie Audus noted that the book is filled with nonsensical "outrageous" claims and should be regarded as fiction.

== Documentary ==
The book was the basis for the 1979 documentary film of the same name, directed by Walon Green and featuring a soundtrack by Stevie Wonder, later released as Stevie Wonder's Journey Through the Secret Life of Plants. The film made use of time-lapse photography (where plants are seen growing in a few seconds, creepers reach out to other plants and tug on them, mushrooms and flowers open). The film was originally distributed by Paramount Pictures.

== See also ==
- Plant perception (paranormal)
- Plant perception (physiology)
- Stevie Wonder's Journey Through "The Secret Life of Plants", Stevie Wonder's soundtrack for the documentary
