= Marcel Vogel =

American inventor, researcher, and mystic

- Born: April 14, 1917; San Francisco, California
- Died: February 12, 1991 (aged 73); San Jose, California
- Known for: Luminescence; Liquid crystal system Magnetics
- Scientific career
- Fields: Chemistry; Physics; Esotericism
- Workplaces: Vogel Luminescence; IBM

Marcel Joseph Vogel (April 14, 1917 – February 12, 1991) was a research scientist working at the IBM San Jose Research Center for 27 years. He is sometimes referred to as Dr. Vogel, although this title was based on an honorary degree, not a Ph.D. Later in his career, he became interested in various theories of quartz crystals and other occult and esoteric fields of study.

== Mainstream scientific work ==
It is claimed that Vogel started his research into luminescence while he was still in his teens. This research eventually led him to publish his thesis, Luminescence in Liquids and Solids and Their Practical Application, in collaboration with University of Chicago's Dr. Peter Pringsheim in 1943.

Two years after the publication, Vogel incorporated his own company, Vogel Luminescence, in San Francisco. For the next decade the firm developed a variety of new products: fluorescent crayons, tags for insecticides, a black light inspection kit to determine the secret trackways of rodents in cellars from their urine and the psychedelic colors popular in "new age" posters. In 1957, Vogel Luminescence was sold to Ultra Violet Products and Vogel joined IBM as a full-time research scientist. He retired from IBM in 1984.

In 1977 and 1978, Vogel participated in experiments with the Markovich Tesla Electrical Power Source, referred to as MTEPS, that was built by Peter T. Markovich.

He received 32 patents for his inventions up through his tenure at IBM. Among these was the magnetic coating for the 24" hard disk drive systems still in use. His areas of expertise, besides luminescence, were phosphor technology, magnetics and liquid crystal systems.

At Vogel's February 14, 1991 funeral, IBM researcher and Sacramento, California physician Bernard McGinity, M.D. said of him, "He made his mark because of the brilliance of his mind, his prolific ideas, and his seemingly limitless creativity."

== Fringe science ==
=== Crystals ===
Vogel was a proponent of crystal healing, and believed cut crystals can have healing powers.

=== Billy Meier UFO metal sample ===
Vogel examined a metal sample which was allegedly given to Billy Meier by extraterrestrials, but by misinterpreting a graph on a test instrument, erroneously concluded it contained thallium, a rare metal.

=== Communication between plants ===
Vogel was a proponent of research into plant consciousness and believed "empathy between plant and human" could be established.

== In popular culture ==
Vogel was featured in the first episode of In Search Of... hosted by Leonard Nimoy, called "Other Voices". He gave his theories regarding the possibility of communication between plants.

== See also ==
- Pyramid power
- Crystal healing
