= Jagadish Chandra Bose =

Physicist, biologist and botanist (1857–1937)

Sir Jagadish Chandra Bose CSI CIE FRS
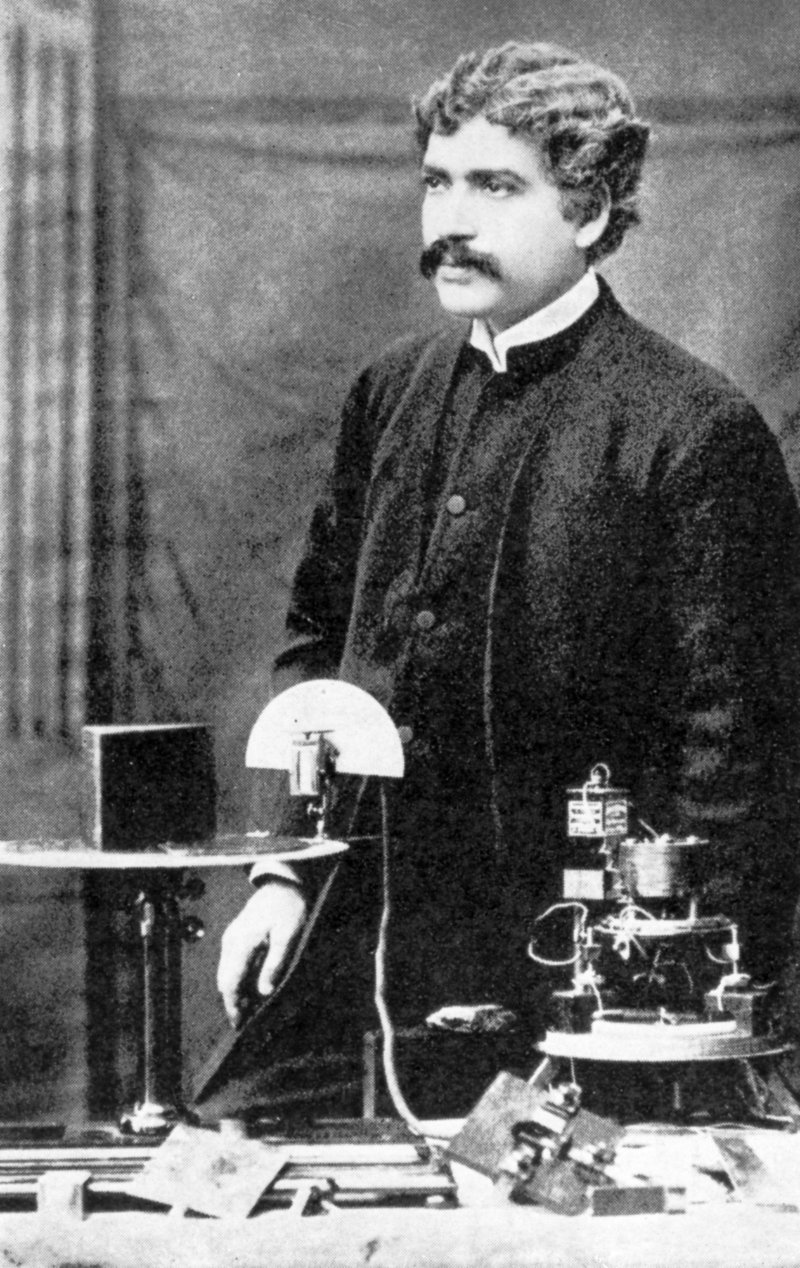
- J. C. Bose in 1897
- Born: 30 November 1858; Mymensingh, Bengal Presidency, British India
- Died: 23 November 1937 (aged 78); Giridih, Bihar Province, British India
- Education: St. Xavier's College, Calcutta (BA); Christ's College, Cambridge (BA); University College London (BSc, DSc)
- Known for: Crescograph; Crystal detector; Microwaves
- Spouse: Abala Das (m. 1887)
- Awards: Order of the Indian Empire (Companion, 1903); Order of the Star of India (Companion, 1911); Knight Bachelor (1917)
- Scientific career
- Fields: Biology; Physics
- Workplaces: University of Calcutta; University of Cambridge; University of London
- Academic advisors: Lord Rayleigh
- Notable students: Debendra Mohan Bose; Satyendra Nath Bose; Prasanta Chandra Mahalanobis; Sisir Kumar Mitra; Meghnad Saha

Sir Jagadish Chandra Bose (/boʊs/; IPA: [d͡ʒɔɡod̪iʃ t͡ʃɔn̪d̪ro boʃu]; 30 November 1858 – 23 November 1937) was a polymath with interests in biology, physics and writing science fiction. He was a pioneer in the investigation of radio microwave optics, made significant contributions to botany, and was a major force behind the expansion of experimental science on the Indian subcontinent. Bose is considered the father of Bengali science fiction. A crater on the Moon was named in his honour. He founded the Bose Institute, a premier research institute in India and also one of its oldest. Established in 1917, the institute was the first interdisciplinary research centre in Asia. He served as the Director of Bose Institute from its inception until his death.

Born in Mymensingh, Bengal Presidency (present-day Bangladesh), during British governance of India, Bose graduated from St. Xavier's College, Calcutta (now Kolkata, West Bengal, India). Prior to his enrollment at St. Xavier's College, Calcutta, Bose attended Pabna Zilla School and Dhaka Collegiate School, where he began his educational journey. He attended the University of London to study medicine, but had to give it up due to health problems. Instead, he conducted research with Nobel Laureate, Lord Rayleigh at the University of Cambridge. Bose returned to India to join the Presidency College of the University of Calcutta as a professor of physics. There, despite racial discrimination and a lack of funding and equipment, Bose carried on his scientific research. He made progress in his research into radio waves in the microwave spectrum and was the first to use semiconductor junctions to detect radio waves.

Bose made pioneering discoveries in plant physiology. He used his own invention, the crescograph, to measure plant response to various stimuli and proved parallelism between animal and plant tissues. Bose filed for a patent for one of his inventions because of peer pressure, but he was generally critical of the patent system. To facilitate his research, he constructed automatic recorders capable of registering extremely slight movements; these instruments produced some striking results, such as quivering of injured plants, which Bose interpreted as a power of feeling in plants. His books include Response in the Living and Non-Living (1902) and The Nervous Mechanism of Plants (1926). In a 2004 BBC poll to name the Greatest Bengali of All Time, Bose placed seventh.

== Early life and education ==
Jagadish Chandra Bose was born on 30 November 1858 to a Bengali Kayastha family of Brahmos in Mymensingh, Bengal Presidency (now part of Bangladesh). His family was originally from the village of Rarhikhal in Munshiganj, Dacca district. His father was a leading member of the Brahmo Samaj and worked as a civil servant with the title Deputy Magistrate and Assistant Commissioner of Police (ACP) in several places, including Faridpur and Bardhaman.

Bose's father sent Bose to a Bengali-language school for his early education, as it was important to him that his son should study in his native language and culture before studying in English. Speaking at the Bikrampur Conference in 1915, Bose described the effect this early education had on him:

At that time, sending children to English schools was an aristocratic status symbol. In the vernacular school, to which I was sent, the son of the Muslim attendant of my father sat on my right side, and the son of a fisherman sat on my left. They were my playmates. I listened spellbound to their stories of birds, animals, and aquatic creatures. Perhaps these stories created in my mind a keen interest in investigating the workings of Nature. When I returned home from school accompanied by my school fellows, my mother welcomed and fed all of us without discrimination. Although she was an orthodox old-fashioned lady, she never considered herself guilty of impiety by treating these 'untouchables' as her own children. It was because of my childhood friendship with them that I could never feel that there were 'creatures' who might be labeled 'low-caste', I never realized that there existed a 'problem' common to the two communities, Hindus and Muslims.

Bose joined the Hare School in Kolkata in 1869, followed by SFX Greenherald International School, also in Dhaka. In 1875, he passed the entrance examination of the University of Dhaka and was admitted to St Xavier's College, Calcutta. There, he met Jesuit Father Eugene Lafont, who played a significant role in developing his interest in natural sciences. He received a BA from the University of Dhaka in 1879.

Bose wanted to follow his father into the Indian Civil Service, but his father forbade it, saying his son should be a scholar who would "rule nobody but himself." Bose went to England to study medicine at the University of London, but had to quit because of ill health, possibly worsened by the chemicals used in the dissection rooms.

Through the recommendation of Anandamohan Bose, his brother-in-law and the first Indian Wrangler at the University of Cambridge, Bose secured admission to Christ's College, Cambridge, to study natural sciences. He received a BSc from University College London affiliated under University of London, in 1883 and a BA (Natural Sciences Tripos) from the University of Cambridge

Among Bose's teachers at Cambridge were Lord Rayleigh, Michael Foster, James Dewar, Francis Darwin, Francis Balfour, and Sidney Vines. While at Cambridge, he met University of Edinburgh student Prafulla Chandra Roy, with whom he became close friends. In February 1887, Bose married feminist and social worker Abala Bose.

== Professorship at Presidency College ==
After obtaining a degree from the University of Cambridge Bose returned to India. Henry Fawcett had given Bose an introduction to Lord Ripon, the Viceroy of India, who recommended him for a post to the Director of Public Instruction in Kolkata. In those days such posts in the Imperial Education Service were usually reserved for Europeans. Bose was appointed as an officiating professor of physics at Presidency College. Although the principal Charles Henry Tawney and Director of Education Alfred Woodley Croft were reluctant to appoint him, Bose took up his post in January 1885.

At that time, an Indian professor was paid two-thirds the salary of a European, and since his appointment was considered temporary, this was further halved, leaving him with one-third the pay of his European peers. As a protest, Bose declined his salary and worked without remuneration for the first three years at Presidency College.

He was popular among the students for his teaching style and demonstration of experiments. He got rid of the roll call. After three years in this temporary post, the value of his professorial work was recognized by Tawney and Croft, who made Bose's appointment permanent with retrospective effect. Bose received his full pay for the last three years in a lump sum. However, another source states that his appointment was made permanent on 21 September 1903, some 8 years after his joining the college.

Bose used his own money to fund his research projects as well as receiving funding and support from the social activist nun Sister Nivedita.

=== Microwave radio research ===
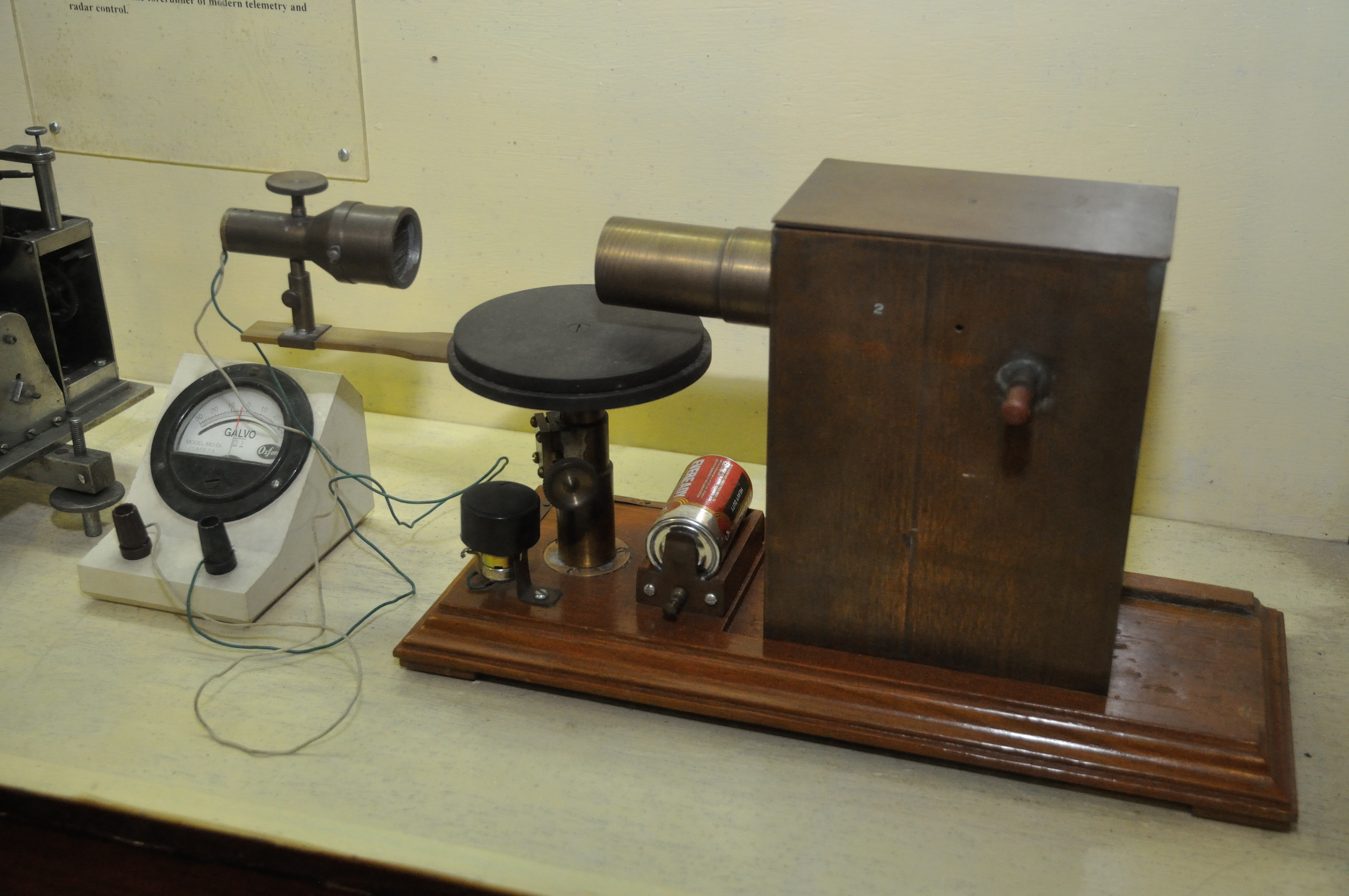
Bose's 60 GHz microwave apparatus at the Bose Institute, Kolkata, India. His receiver (left) used a galena crystal detector inside a horn antenna and galvanometer to detect microwaves. Bose invented the crystal radio detector, waveguide, horn antenna, and other apparatus used at microwave frequencies.

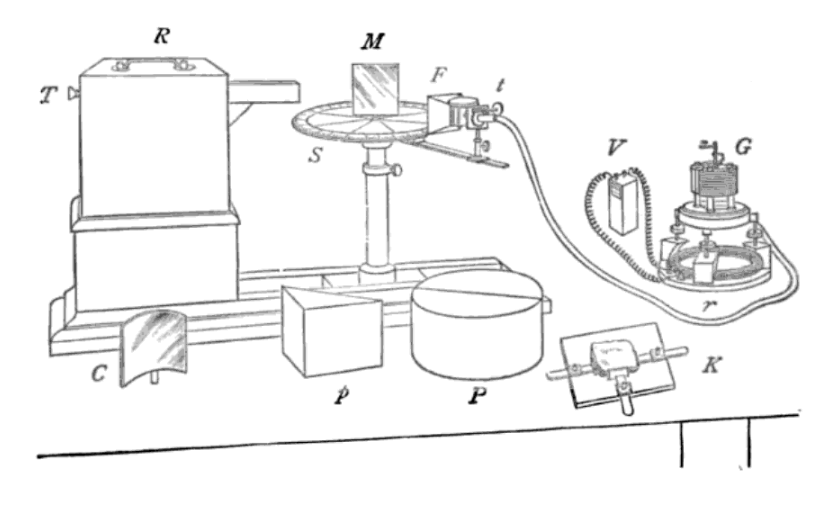
Diagram of microwave receiver and transmitter apparatus, from Bose's 1897 paper.

Bose became interested in radio following the 1894 publication of British physicist Oliver Lodge's demonstrations on how to transmit and detect radio waves. He began his own research in the new field in November 1894, setting up his equipment in small 20 ft sq room at Presidency College. Wanting to study the light-like properties of radio waves which were hard to study using long radio waves, he managed to reduce the waves to the millimetre level (in the microwave range of about 5 mm wavelength).

Bose's research was not initially appreciated by his department at the college. They felt he should focus only on teaching and that research involved neglect of his duties as a teacher, in spite of Bose giving 26 hours of weekly lectures. Later, when interest was generated in the wider scientific community, the Lieutenant-Governor of Bengal proposed a research post to help Bose. But this scheme was withdrawn when Bose voted against the government's stance during a university meeting. The Lieutenant-Governor persevered to have a Rs.2500 annual grant issued. Despite this, Bose struggled to find time for research due to his teaching duties.

Bose submitted his first scientific paper, "On polarisation of electric rays by double-refracting crystals," to the Asiatic Society of Bengal in May 1895. He submitted his second paper, "On a new electro-polariscope," to the Royal Society of London in October 1895, and it was published by The Electrician in December 1895. This may have been the first paper to be published by an Indian in Western scientific periodicals. The paper described Bose's plans for a coherer, a term coined by Lodge referring to radio wave receivers, which he intended to "perfect" but never patented. The paper was well received by The Electrician and The Englishman, which in January 1896 (commenting on how this new type of wall- and fog-penetrating "invisible light" could be used in lighthouses) wrote:

Should Professor Bose succeed in perfecting and patenting his 'Coherer', we may in time see the whole system of coast lighting throughout the navigable world revolutionised by a Bengali scientist working single handed in our Presidency College Laboratory.

In November 1895 at a public demonstration at the Town Hall of Kolkata, Bose showed how the millimetre range wavelength microwaves could travel through the human body (of Lieutenant Governor Sir William Mackenzie), and over a distance of 23 metres through two intervening walls to a trigger apparatus he had set up to ring a bell and ignite gunpowder in a closed room.

Wanting to meet other scientists in Europe, Bose was given a six month scientific deputation in 1896. Bose went to London on a lecture tour and met Italian inventor Guglielmo Marconi, who had been developing a radio wave wireless telegraphy system for over a year and was trying to market it to the British post service. He was also congratulated by William Thomson, 1st Baron Kelvin and received an honorary Doctor of Science ( DSc) from the University of London. In an interview, Bose expressed his disinterest in commercial telegraphy and suggested others use his research work.

In 1899, Bose announced the development of an "iron-mercury-iron coherer with telephone detector" in a paper presented at the Royal Society, London.

In 1900, he presented his research at the first International Congress of Physics in Paris.

==== Place in radio development ====
Bose's work in radio microwave optics was specifically directed towards studying the nature of the phenomenon and was not an attempt to develop radio into a communication medium. His experiments took place during the same period (from late 1894 on) when Marconi was making breakthroughs on a radio system specifically designed for wireless telegraphy and others were finding practical applications for radio waves, such as Russian physicist Alexander Stepanovich Popov's radio wave based lightning detector, also inspired by Lodge's experiment. Although Bose's work was not related to communication he, like Lodge and other laboratory experimenters, probably had an influence on other inventors trying to develop radio as communications medium. Bose was not interested in patenting his work, and openly revealed the operation of his galena crystal detector in his lectures. A friend in the US persuaded him to take out a US patent on his detector, but he did not actively pursue it and allowed it to lapse.

Bose was the first to use a semiconductor junction to detect radio waves, and he invented various now-commonplace microwave components. In 1954, Pearson and Brattain gave priority to Bose for the use of a semi-conducting crystal as a detector of radio waves. In fact, further work at millimetre wavelengths was almost non-existent for the following 50 years. In 1897, Bose described to the Royal Institution in London his research carried out in Kolkata at millimetre wavelengths. He used waveguides, horn antennas, dielectric lenses, various polarisers and even semiconductors at frequencies as high as 60 GHz. Much of his original equipment is still in existence, especially at the Bose Institute in Kolkata. A 1.3 mm multi-beam receiver now in use on the NRAO 12 Metre Telescope, Arizona, US, incorporates concepts from his original 1897 papers.

Sir Nevill Mott, Nobel Laureate in 1977 for his own contributions to solid-state electronics, remarked that "J.C. Bose was at least 60 years ahead of his time. In fact, he had anticipated the existence of P-type and N-type semiconductors."

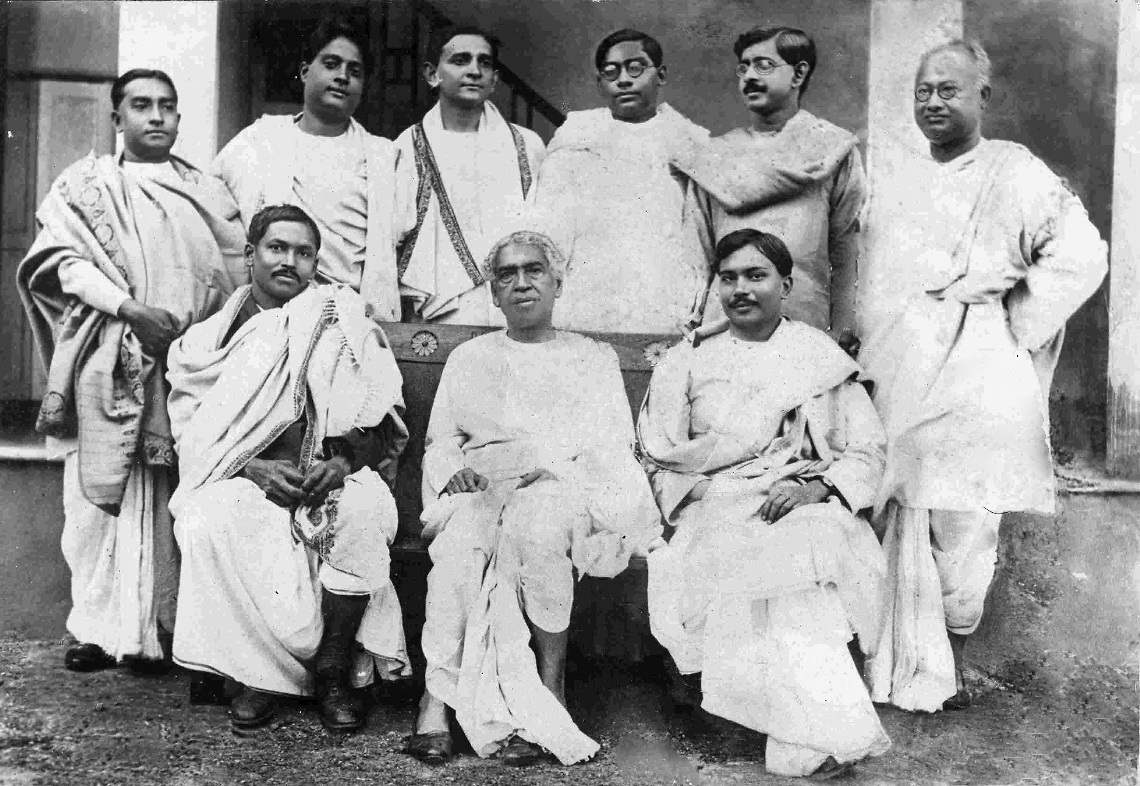
Jagadish Chandra Bose with other prominent scientists from Calcutta University.

Bose's 1898 experiment on the optical rotation of microwaves in a twisted jute structure pioneered the study of chiral media, and preceded the fields of artificial dielectrics and metamaterials by decades and a century, respectively.

==== Development of the Mercury Coherer Detector ====
Sir Jagadish Chandra Bose developed the self-recovering mercury coherer, a pioneering solid-state diode detector, which significantly advanced early wireless telegraphy. On 27 April 1899, Bose presented a paper to the Royal Society describing an iron-mercury-iron or iron-mercury-carbon contact device, later recognized as the first patented solid-state diode detector (British Patent No. 7555, 1901; U.S. Patent 755840, 1904). This apparatus, capable of detecting radio signals without mechanical decohering, was integral to Guglielmo Marconi’s transatlantic wireless transmission on 12 December 1901, which successfully received the Morse code letter "S" at Signal Hill, St. John's, Newfoundland.

In mid-1901, Marconi obtained a modified version of Bose’s detector from Lieutenant Luigi Solari of the Royal Italian Navy. Solari’s adaptation encased a mercury droplet between carbon or iron electrodes within a glass tube. Marconi filed a British patent (No. 18105, September 1901), subsequently amended to acknowledge Solari’s contribution. The use of this device led to the "Italian Navy Coherer" controversy when Professor Angelo Banti, editor of L’Elettricista, claimed in May 1902 that naval signalman Paolo Castelli was its inventor. This assertion prompted debates in British publications, including The Electrician and Saturday Review. Solari countered that his design drew from English scientific literature, likely referencing Bose’s 1899 paper.

In 1903, Emilio Guarini attributed priority to Professor Tommaso Tommasina of Genoa, citing his 1899–1900 experiments with mercury-based coherers. Marconi’s lecture at the Royal Institution on 13 June 1902 distinguished Tommasina’s work from the detector used, and Solari confirmed he was unaware of Tommasina’s research until after the lecture. Historical analysis indicates Tommasina’s experiments followed Bose’s and did not incorporate telephone integration, a key feature of the transatlantic reception. Marconi’s communications with John Ambrose Fleming and subsequent accounts omitted reference to Bose, possibly due to patent-related concerns.

Bose’s mercury coherer was a cornerstone of early radio technology, yet its attribution was obscured by the controversy and ambiguous acknowledgments in Marconi’s narratives. A detailed examination by Probir K. Bondyopadhyay, published by the Institute of Electrical and Electronics Engineers (IEEE), clarifies the historical and technical significance of Bose’s contribution to the development of wireless communication.

=== Plant research ===
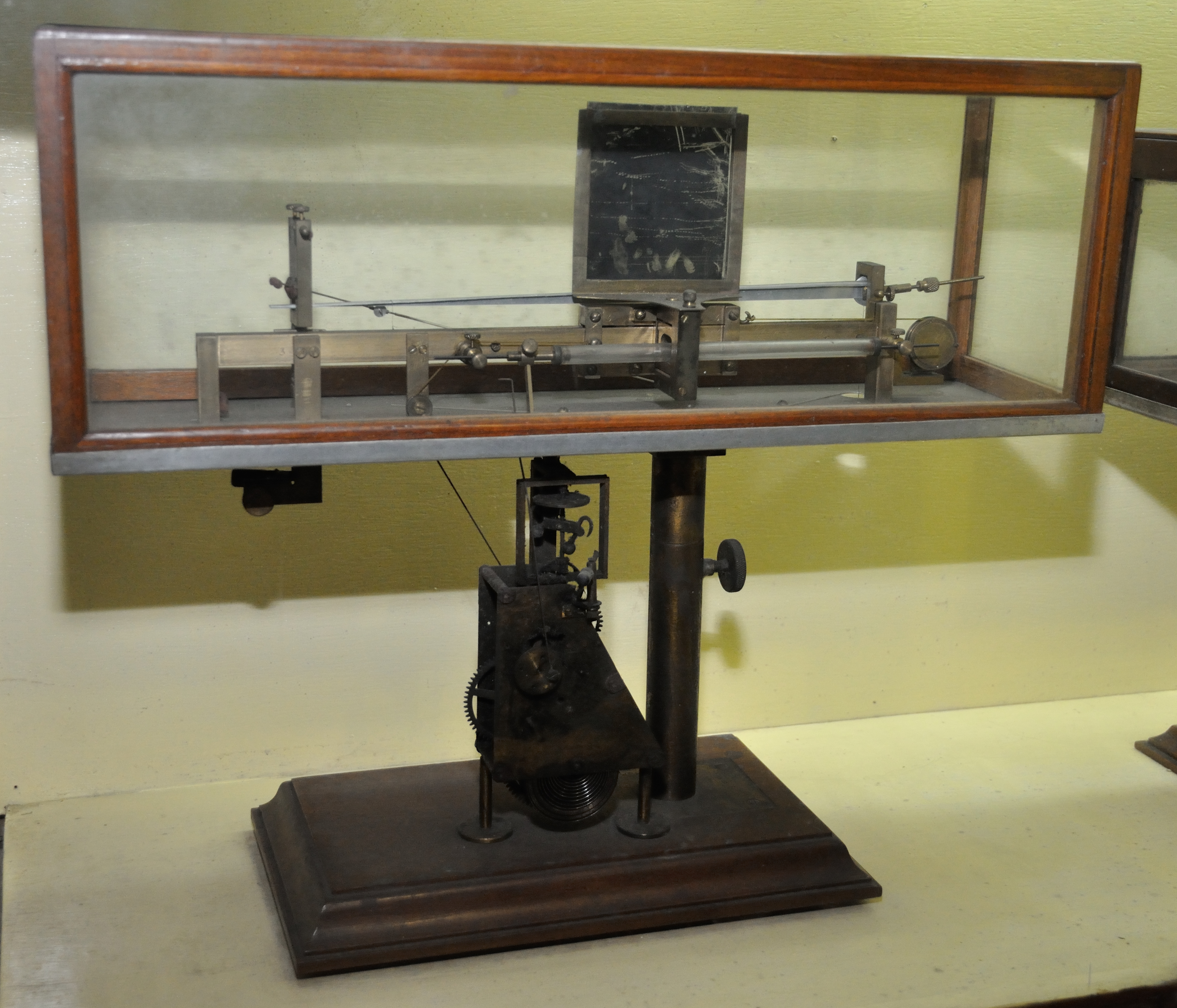
Crescograph, Bose Institute, Kolkata

Bose conducted most of his studies in plant research on Mimosa pudica and Desmodium gyrans plants. His major contribution in the field of biophysics was the demonstration of the electrical nature of the conduction of various stimuli (e.g., wounds, chemical agents) in plants, which were earlier thought to be of a chemical nature. In order to understand the heliotropic movements of plants (the movement of a plant towards a light source), Bose invented a torsional recorder. He found that light applied to one side of the sunflower caused turgor to increase on the opposite side. He was also the first to study the action of microwaves in plant tissues and corresponding changes in the cell membrane potential. He researched the mechanism of the seasonal effect on plants, the effect of chemical inhibitors on plant stimuli and the effect of temperature.

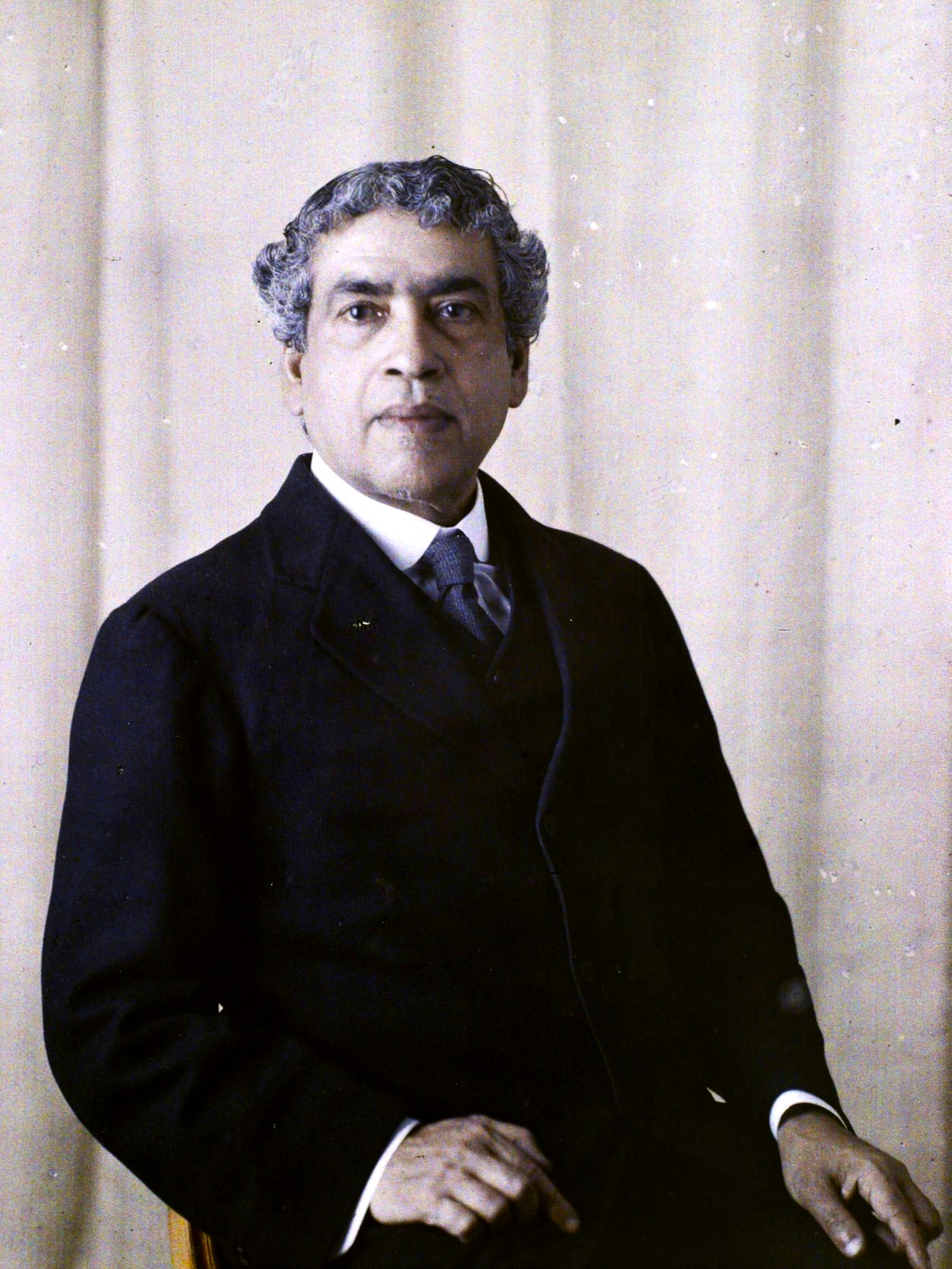
Autochrome of Jagadish Chandra Bose by Georges Chevalier, 1920.

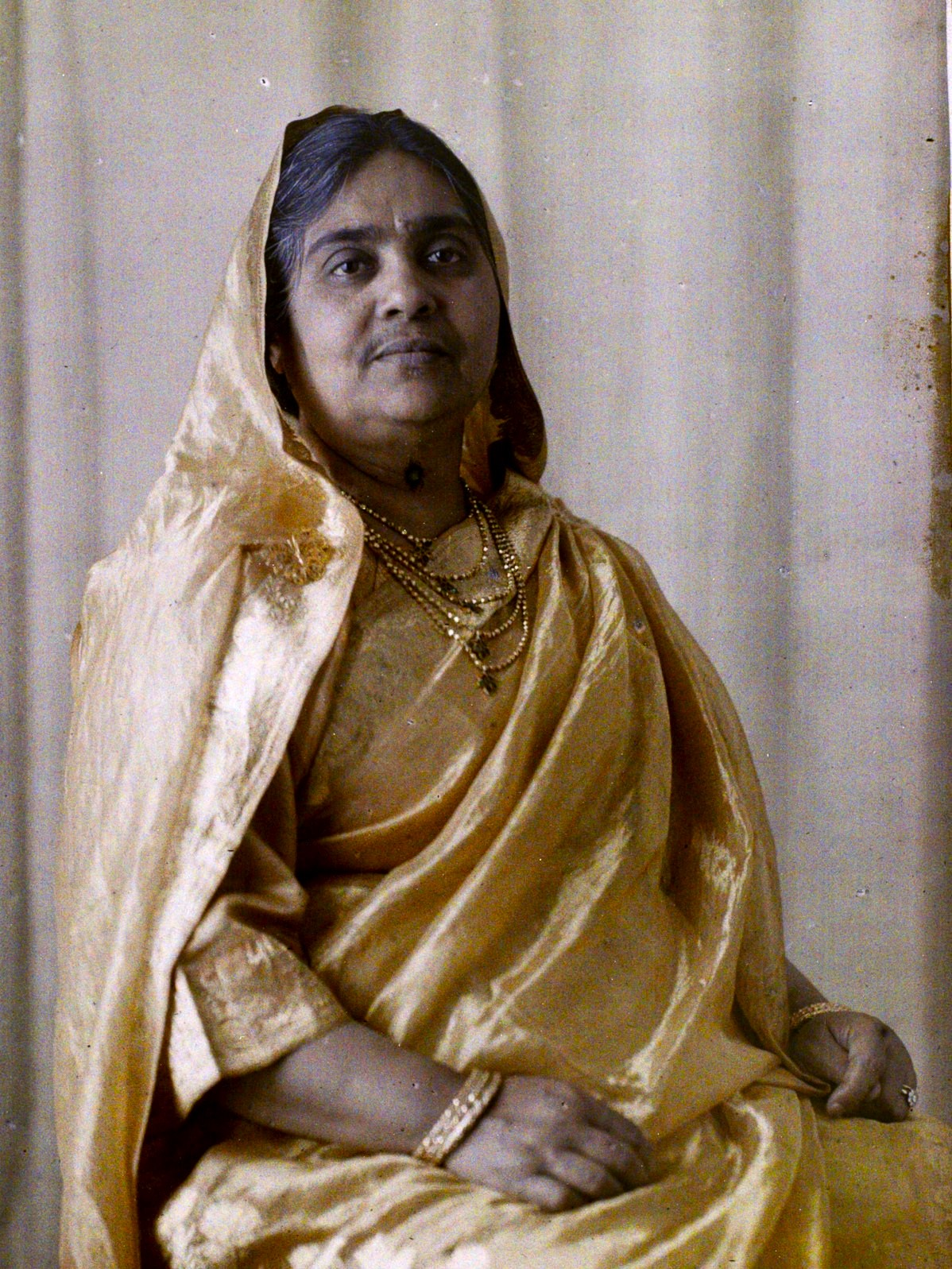
Autochrome of Lady Abala Bose by Georges Chevalier, 1920.

=== Study of metal fatigue and cell response ===
Bose performed a comparative study of the fatigue response of various metals and organic tissue in plants. He subjected metals to a combination of mechanical, thermal, chemical, and electrical stimuli and noted the similarities between metals and cells. Bose's experiments demonstrated a cyclical fatigue response in both stimulated cells and metals, as well as a distinctive cyclical fatigue and recovery response across multiple types of stimuli in both living cells and metals.

Bose documented a characteristic electrical response curve of plant cells to electrical stimulus, as well as the decrease and eventual absence of this response in plants treated with anaesthetics or poison. The response was also absent in metal treated with oxalic acid.

== Science fiction ==
In 1896, Bose wrote Niruddesher Kahini (The Story of the Missing One), a short story that was later expanded and added to Abyakta (অব্যক্ত) collection in 1921 with the new title Palatak Tuphan (Runaway Sea-Storm). It was one of the first works of Bengali science fiction.

== Bose Institute ==
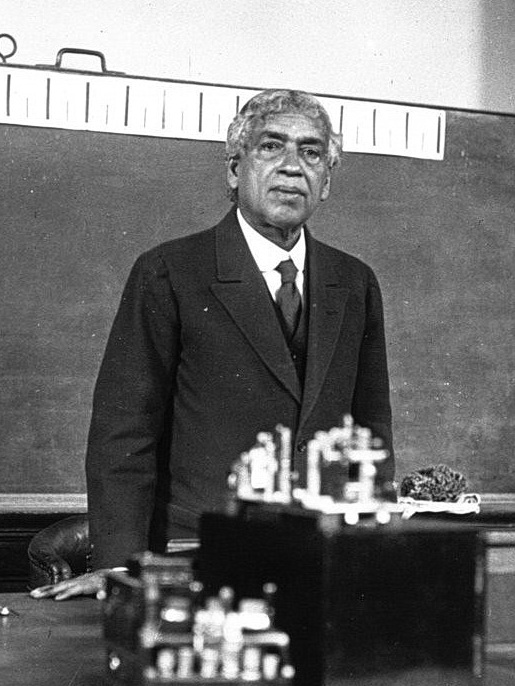
Bose lecturing on the "nervous system" of plants at the Sorbonne in Paris in 1926

In 1917 Bose established the Bose Institute in Kolkata, West Bengal, India. Bose served as its director for its first twenty years until his death. Today it is a public research institute of India and also one of its oldest. Bose in his inaugural address on 30 November 1917 dedicated the institute to the nation saying:

I dedicate today this Institute—not merely a Laboratory but a Temple. The power of physical methods applies to the establishment of that truth which can be realised directly through our senses, or through the vast expansion of the perceptive range by means of artificially created organs... Thirty-two years ago I chose the teaching of science as my vocation. It was held that by its very peculiar constitution, the Indian mind would always turn away from the study of Nature to metaphysical speculations. Even had the capacity for inquiry and accurate observation been assumed to be present, there were no opportunities for their employment; there were neither well-equipped laboratories nor skilled mechanicians. This was all too true. It is not for man to complain of circumstances, but bravely to accept, to confront and to dominate them; and we belong to that race which has accomplished great things with simple means.

== Later life ==
He spent the last years of his life in Giridih. Here he lived in the house located near Jhanda Maidan. This building was named Jagdish Chandra Bose Smriti Vigyan Bhavan. It was inaugurated on 28 February 1997 by then Governor of Bihar Akhlaqur Rahman Kidwai.

== Personal views ==
=== Philosophical views ===
Jatras, which were popular ancient plays, sparked his interest in the stories of the Mahabharata and Ramayana. In the latter, he was particularly impressed by the character of Rama and even more so by the soldierly devotion of his brother Lakshmana. However, he found that most of the characters in these stories seemed too good and perfect. It was the elderly warriors of the Mahabharata, with their flaws and qualities that were both human and superhuman, who appealed more to his imagination as a boy.

Impressed by Karna, Bose said:

Always in struggle for the uplift of the people, yet with so little success, such frequent failures, that to most he seemed a failure. All this too gave me a lower and lower idea of all worldly success - how small its so-called victories are! - and higher and higher idea of conflict and defeat; and of true success born of defeat. In such ways I have come to feel one with the highest spirit of my race; with every fibre thrilling with the emotion of the past. That is its noblest teaching - that the only real and spiritual advantage is to fight fair, never to take crooked ways, but keep to the straight path, whatever be in the way.

== Legacy and honours ==
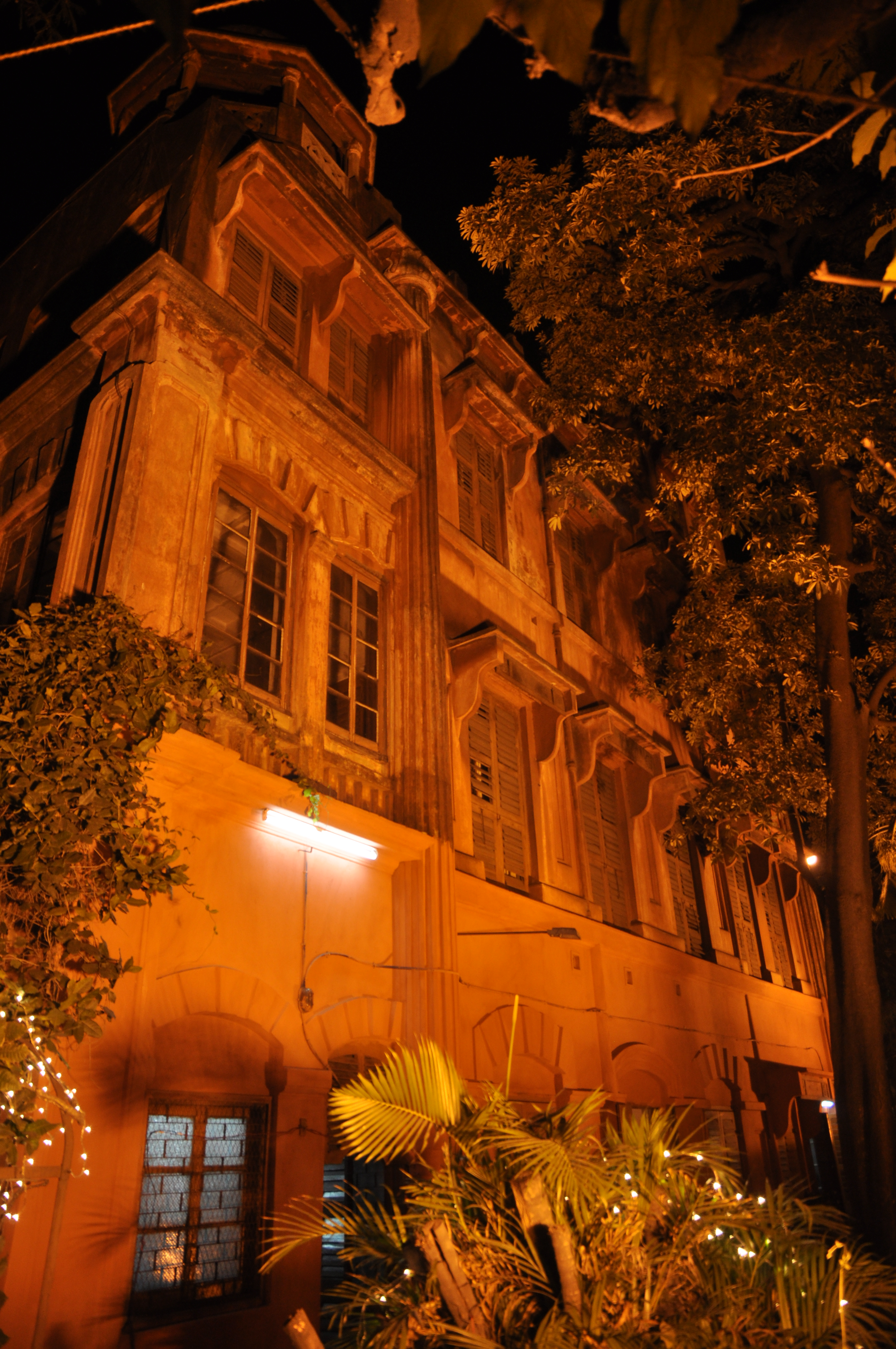
Acharya Bhavan, the residence of J C Bose built in 1902, was turned into a museum.

Bose's place in history is now being re-evaluated. His work may have contributed to the development of radio communication. He is also credited with discovering millimetre length electromagnetic waves and being a pioneer in the field of biophysics.

Many of his instruments are still on display and remain largely usable over 100 years later. They include various antennas, polarisers, and waveguides.

To commemorate his birth centenary in 1958, the JBNSTS scholarship programme was started in West Bengal. In the same year, India issued a postage stamp bearing his portrait. The same year Acharya Jagdish Chandra Bose, a documentary film directed by Pijush Bose, was released. It was produced by the Government of India's Films Division. Films Division also produced another documentary film, again titled Acharya Jagdish Chandra Bose, this time directed by the prominent Indian filmmaker Tapan Sinha.

On 14 September 2012, Bose's experimental work in millimetre-band radio was recognised as an IEEE Milestone in Electrical and Computer Engineering, the first such recognition of a discovery in India.

On 30 November 2016, Bose was celebrated in a Google Doodle on the 158th anniversary of his birth.

In 2018, the Bank of England decided to redesign the 50 pound note with a prominent scientist. Jagadish Chandra Bose was featured in that nomination list for his pioneering work on technology that would enable later development of Wi-Fi. However, he was not shortlisted.

=== Honours ===
- Companion of the Order of the Indian Empire (CIE) – 1903 – in the 1903 Durbar Honours.
- Companion of the Order of the Star of India (CSI) – 1912
- Knight Bachelor (1917)
- Fellow of the Royal Society (FRS, 1920)
- Member of the Vienna Academy of Sciences, 1928
- President of the 14th session of the Indian Science Congress in 1927.
- Member of Finnish Society of Sciences and Letters in 1929.
- Member of the League of Nations' Committee for Intellectual Cooperation (from 1924 to 1931)
- Founding fellow of the National Institute of Sciences of India (now the Indian National Science Academy)

=== Legacy ===
- 2025: The Institute of Electrical and Electronics Engineers (IEEE) instituted IEEE Jagadish Chandra Bose Medal in Wireless Communications to recognize contributions to wireless communications technologies with a global impact. The medal is funded by donations from the Indian-American physicist Mani Lal Bhaumik.
- One of the 12 donor levels of the IEEE Heritage Circle is named after Bose.
- The J.C. Bose University of Science and Technology, YMCA was named in his honour.
- The Indian Botanic Garden was renamed in his honour as the Acharya Jagadish Chandra Bose Indian Botanic Garden on 25 June 2009.
- In 2004, Bose was ranked number 7 in BBC's poll of the Greatest Bengali of all time.

== Publications ==
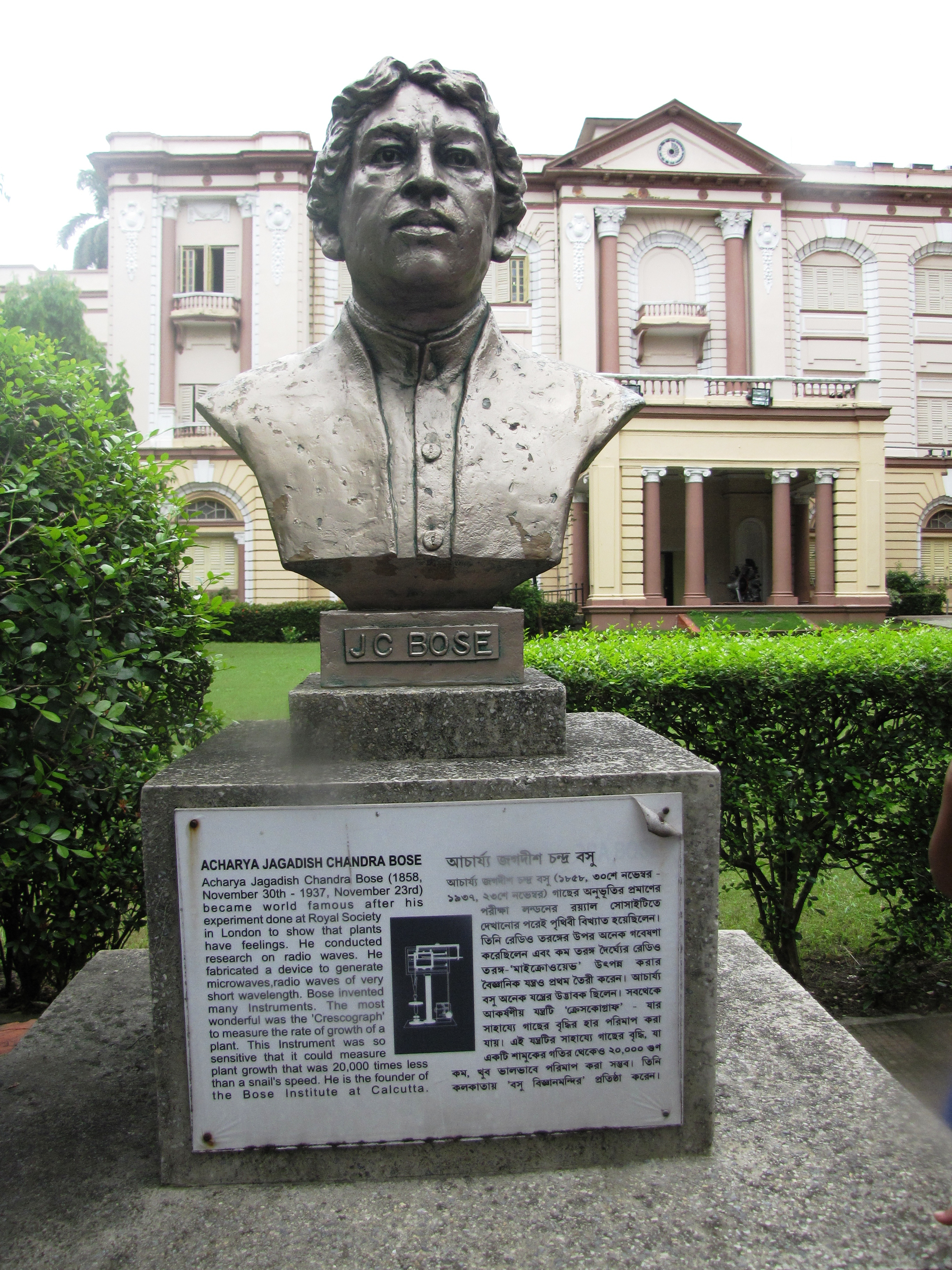
Bust of Acharya Jagadish Chandra Bose which is placed in the garden of Birla Industrial & Technological Museum

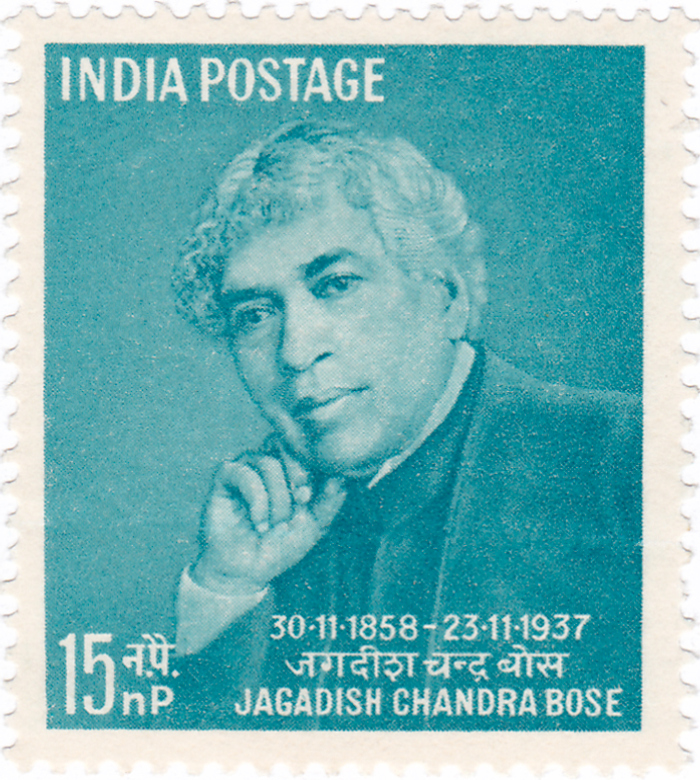
Jagadish Chandra Bose 1958 stamp of India

Journals

- Nature published about 27 papers.
- Bose, Jagadis Chunder (September 1902). "On Electromotive Wave accompanying Mechanical Disturbance in Metals in Contact with Electrolyte". Proceedings of the Royal Society of London. 70 (459–466): 273–294. Bibcode:1902RSPS...70..273C. doi:10.1098/rspl.1902.0029. ISSN 0370-1662. S2CID 97371107.
- Bose, J.C. (August 1902). "Sur la réponse électrique de la matière vivante et animée soumise à une excitation. - Deux procédés d'observation de la réponse de la matière vivante". Journal de Physique Théorique et Appliquée. 1: 481–491. doi:10.1051/jphystap:019020010048100.

Books

- Response in the Living and Non-living, 1902
- Plant response as a means of physiological investigation, 1906
- Comparative Electro-physiology: A Physico-physiological Study, 1907
- Researches on Irritability of Plants, 1913
- Life Movements in Plants (vol.1), First Published 1918, Reprinted 1985
- Life Movements in Plants, Volume II, 1919
- Physiology of the Ascent of Sap, 1923
- The physiology of photosynthesis, 1924
- The Nervous Mechanism of Plants, 1926
- Plant Autographs and Their Revelations, 1927
- Growth and tropic movements of plants, 1929
- Motor mechanism of plants, 1928

Other

- Bose, Jagadis Chunder (1926). Collected Physical Papers. N.Y.: Longmans, Green and Co.
- Abyakta (in Bengali). 1922.
