= Crescograph =

Measuring device

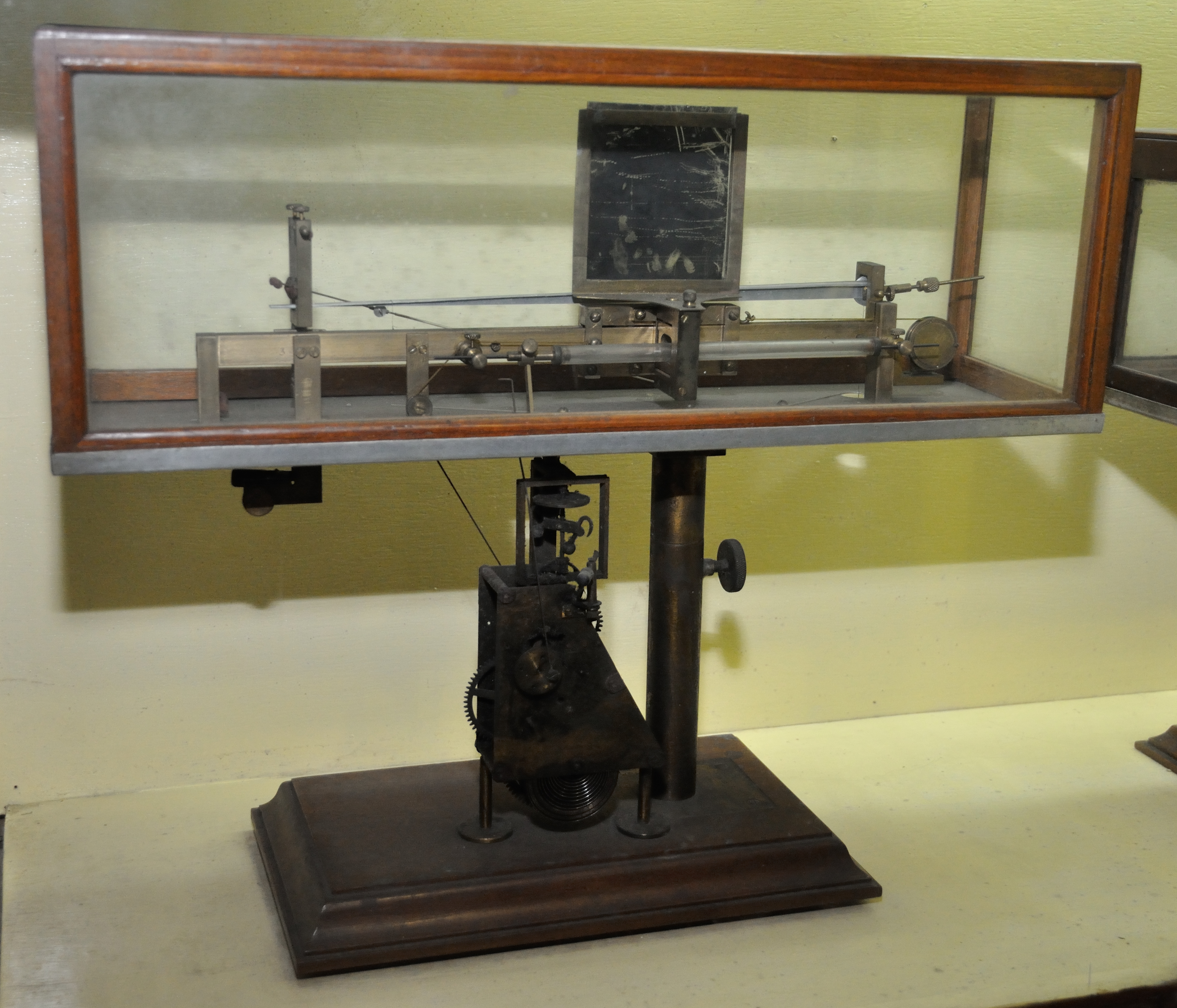
Crescograph, Bose Institute, Kolkata

A crescograph is a device for measuring growth in plants. It was invented in the early 20th century by Jagadish Chandra Bose.

The Bose crescograph uses a series of clockwork gears and a smoked glass plate to record the movement of the tip of a plant (or its roots). It is able to record at magnifications of up to 10,000 times through the use of two different levers. One lever records at 100 times magnification while the other lever takes that image and records at another 100 times magnification. Marks are made on the plate at intervals of a few seconds, demonstrating how the rate of growth varies under varying stimuli. Bose experimented with temperature, chemicals, gases, and electricity.

The electronic crescograph plant movement detector is capable of measurements as small as 1/1,000,000 of an inch. However, its normal operating range is from 1/1000 to 1/10,000 of an inch. The component which actually measures the movement is a differential transformer along with a movable core hinged between two points. A micrometer is used to adjust and calibrate the system. It can record plant growth, magnifying a small movement as much as 10,000,000 times. This machine is highly sensitive; Bose padded the legs of the table on which the crescograph was being used with India-rubber sponges. This negated any vibration which could affect the results.
