= Peter Tompkins =

American journalist

- Born: April 19, 1919; Athens, Georgia, U.S.
- Died: January 24, 2007 (aged 87); Shepherdstown, West Virginia, U.S.
- Occupations: journalist, World War II spy, & author
- Children: Ptolemy Tompkins

Peter Tompkins (April 19, 1919 – January 23, 2007) was an American journalist, World War II Office of Strategic Services (OSS) spy in Rome, and best-selling author.

== Biography ==
Tompkins was born in Athens, Georgia, and later travelled to Rome, where he learned Italian. In 1941, he absconded from Italy and repatriated to the United States, where he served as a war correspondent for the New York Herald Tribune and CBS during World War II. In 1943 he was recruited by the OSS and utilized as an undercover agent in Italy in 1944. He worked closely with Maurizio Giglio, an Italian policeman who was an OSS secret agent. In 1962 he published his diary, titled A Spy in Rome (New York: Simon & Schuster).

His best-known books are The Secret Life of Plants (1973), Secrets of the Great Pyramid (1971; paperback reprint, 1997), and Mysteries of the Mexican Pyramids (1976). His Secrets of the Great Pyramid, Mysteries of the Mexican Pyramids and The Magic of Obelisks have become classics of "New Age" literature.

In 1977, he hosted a documentary film called Secrets of the Bermuda Triangle, directed by Donald Brittain.
