= Trewavas =

Trewavas is a surname. Notable people with the surname include:

- Anthony Trewavas (born 1939), British professor
- Ethelwynn Trewavas, British ichthyologist
- Joseph Trewavas, British Victoria Cross recipient
- Pete Trewavas, British bass guitarist, member of neo-progressive rock band Marillion
