= John Ellis (naturalist) =

British linen merchant and naturalist

John Ellis FRS
- Born: c. 1710
- Died: 15 October 1776 (aged 65–66)
- Occupations: Naturalist, linen merchant
- Awards: Copley Medal; 1767

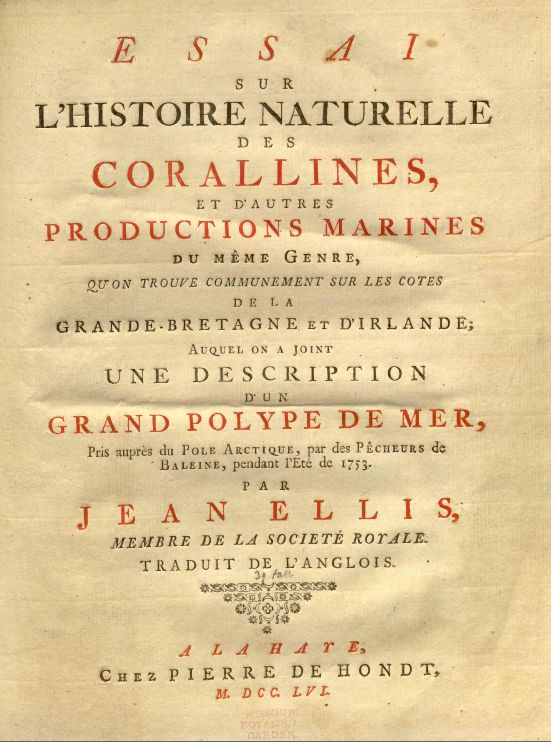
Title page of French translation of "Natural History of the Corallines"

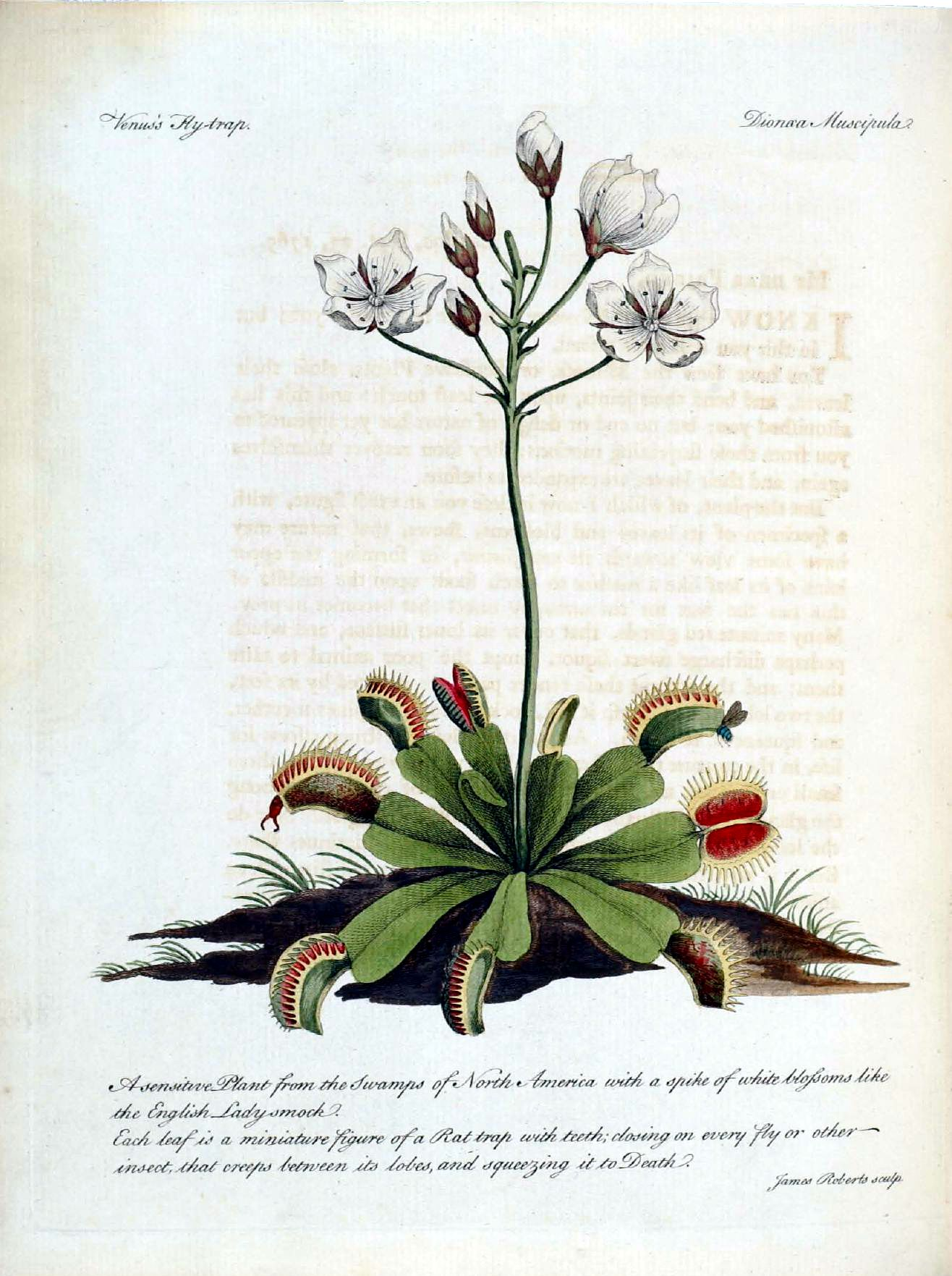
Plate from John Ellis’s "A Botanical Description of the Dionaea Muscipula"

John Ellis FRS (c. 1710 – 15 October 1776) aka Jean Ellis was a British linen merchant and naturalist. Ellis was a correspondent of Carolus Linnaeus and gave the binomial botanical name following the Linnean system to the Venus flytrap. He was also a keen microscopist and studied aquatic organisms including the porifera and cnidaria. The standard author abbreviation J.Ellis is used to indicate this person as the author when citing a botanical name.

== Life and work ==
Ellis's early history is largely unknown. He was born, either in Dublin or London, with some sources suggesting 1714 but based on tax assessment documents of 1732 where he could not have been a minor it is suggested that he was born before 1711. The Dictionary of Irish Biography claims that his father was a cutler named John Ellis married to Martha Ellis daughter of Thomas Sissons (d. 1724), a public notary. He had a sister named Martha and another named Mary who married a Ford. Henry Ellis of Georgia was apparently a family friend. In 1724 he apprenticed as a clothworker in London to Edward Harraden, working for seven years before he received Freeman privileges of the Clothworkers' Company. He worked at St Lawrence Jewry and lived on St Lawrence Lane. His business was good and in 1732 he was a sole proprietor and entered into partnerships starting with John Ellis and James Fivey in 1738 which survived until 1760 when it went bankrupt. Around 1760 he was living at Busbridge near Guildford working as a head gardener for Philip Carteret Webb. In 1744 he was in the linen trade and from 1753 he represented the Irish Linen Board in London. In 1764, with help from Lord Limerick, he became King's Agent for British West Florida, a position that did not need him to be present there. He married Carolina Elizabeth Peers in 1754. He became interested in natural history in the 1740s. He became interested in economic botany and collaborated with Henry Ellis, governor of Georgia, transporting seeds, especially acorns. Ellis was appointed Royal Agent for British Dominica in 1770. He exported many seeds and native plants from North America to England. He corresponded with many botanists, including Carl Linnaeus.

Ellis may have become interested in science after attending a meeting of the Royal Society in 1749 as a guest of Henry Baker. He became a keen microscopist by 1768 and made observations of organisms. He modified the microscope so that it could follow moving organisms in a watchglass and this came to be called by Dollond as the "Aquatic Microscope". Ellis specialised in the study of the so-called zoophytes - then considered to be intermediate to the animals and plants - now included in the sponges and corals. He was elected a member of the Royal Society in 1754 and in the following year published An essay towards the Natural History of the Corallines. He was awarded the Copley Medal in 1768 with a letter from Sir John Pringle. In 1770 he presented papers to the Royal Society on the loblolly bay and the American star anise. He was elected to the American Philosophical Society in 1774. His A Natural History of Many Uncommon and Curious Zoophytes, written with Daniel Solander, was published posthumously in 1776.

== Taxonomist ==
=== Venus's Fly-trap ===
A royal botanist, William Young imported living plants of the Venus flytrap to England. They were then shown to Ellis. In 1769, he wrote a description of the plant discovery from North Carolina to send to the 'Father of Taxonomy', Carl Linnaeus. Ellis also gave it the scientific name of Dionaea muscipula. Later, his essay Directions for bringing over seeds and plants, from the East Indies (1770) included the first illustration of a Venus Flytrap plant.

== Honours ==
He was honoured by having 2 plant genera named after him, Ellisia (in 1763 ) and Ellisiophyllum (in 1871).

== See also ==
- Arthur Dobbs
- Peter Collinson
