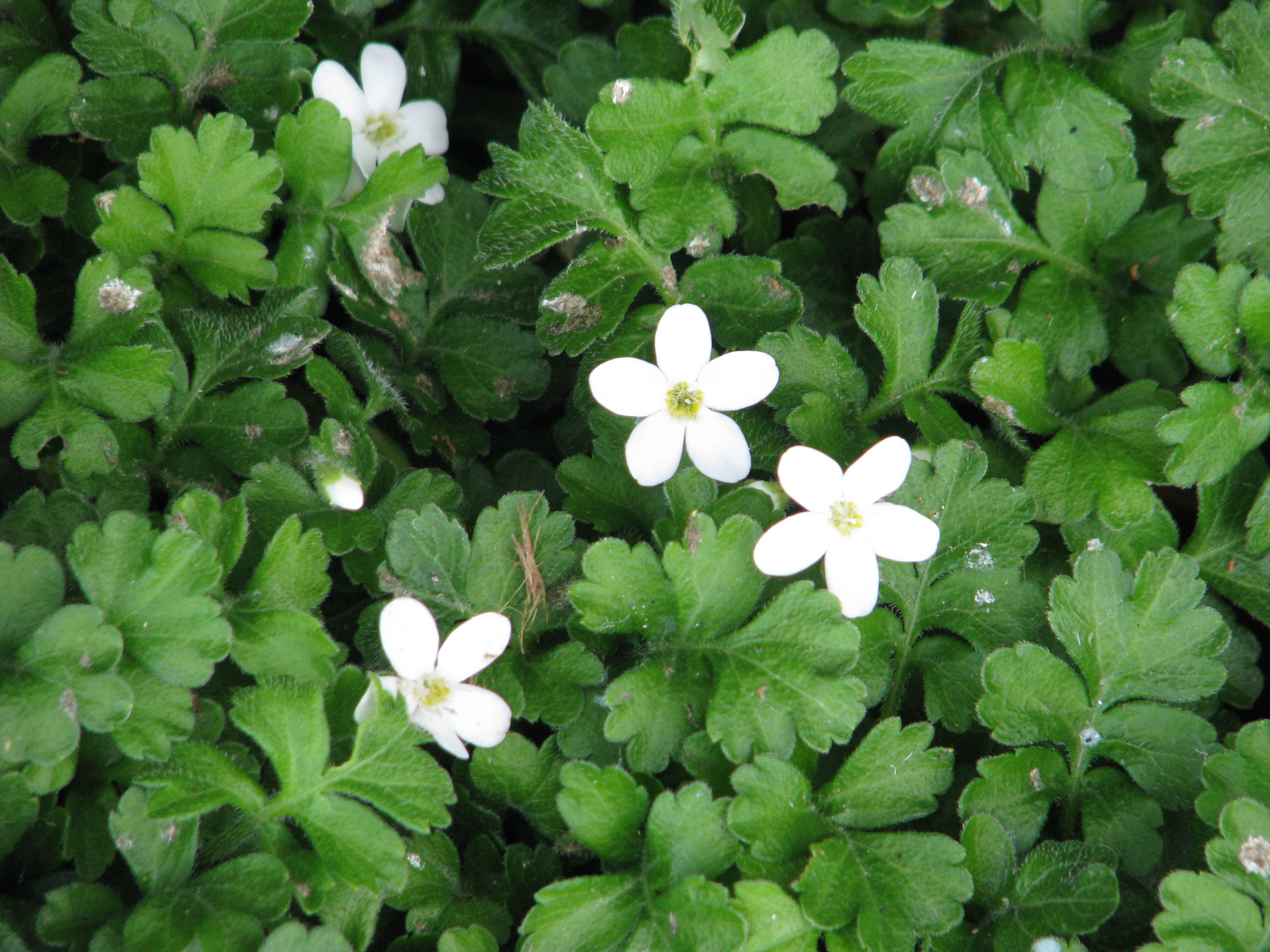
- Ellisiophyllum pinnatum

Scientific classification
- Kingdom: Plantae
- Clade: Tracheophytes
- Clade: Angiosperms
- Clade: Eudicots
- Clade: Asterids
- Order: Lamiales
- Family: Plantaginaceae
- Genus: Ellisiophyllum; Maxim. (1871)
- Species: E. pinnatum

Binomial name
- Ellisiophyllum pinnatum (Wall. ex Benth.) Makino (1906)

Subspecies and varieties
- Ellisiophyllum pinnatum subsp. bhutanense R.R.Mill; Ellisiophyllum pinnatum subsp. pinnatum; Ellisiophyllum pinnatum var. reptans (Maxim.) T.Yamaz.

Synonyms
- Hornemannia Benth. (1846), nom. illeg.; Moseleya Hemsl. (1899); Hornemannia pinnata (Wall. ex Benth.) Benth. (1846); Moseleya pinnata (Wall. ex Benth.) Hemsl. (1899); Ourisia pinnata Wall. ex Benth. (1835); Sibthorpia pinnata (Wall. ex Benth.) Benth. (1884)

= Ellisiophyllum =

Species of plant

Ellisiophyllum is a monotypic genus of flowering plants belonging to the family Plantaginaceae. It contains a single species, Ellisiophyllum pinnatum (Wall. ex Benth.) Makino

Its native range is the central Himalayas to New Guinea. It is found in central and southern China, the central and eastern Himalayas, Japan, Nepal, New Guinea, Philippines and Taiwan.

Its genus name of Ellisiophyllum is in honour of John Ellis (1710–1776), a British linen merchant and naturalist, and phyllum meaning leaf. The specific epithet pinnata is from the Latin meaning "feather-like", referring to the leaves.

It was first published and described in Bot. Mag. (Tokyo) Vol.20 on page 91 in 1906.

Three subdivisions are accepted:

- Ellisiophyllum pinnatum subsp. bhutanense R.R.Mill - eastern Himalayas
- Ellisiophyllum pinnatum subsp. pinnatum – central and eastern Himalayas, central and southern China, Taiwan, Philippines, and New Guinea
- Ellisiophyllum pinnatum var. reptans (Maxim.) T.Yamaz. – Japan (western Honshu and Shikoku)
