= James Perchard Tupper =

British botanist and surgeon (1775–1852)

- Born: 1 May 1775; Guernsey
- Died: 1852; Boulogne-sur-Mer
- Occupation(s): Botanist, surgeon

James Perchard Tupper M.D. (1 May 1775 – 1852) was a British botanist and surgeon who was one of the first to argue for plant sentience.

== Career ==
Tupper was born in Guernsey on 1 May 1775. He studied medicine at Guy's Hospital and St Thomas' Hospital in London but developed an interest in botany. James Edward Smith who held the Botanical Chair at Guy's Hospital encouraged Tupper to study botany. Tupper was skeptical of mechanical explanations for plant behavior and was convinced that plants could experience sensations. Tupper became a Fellow of the Linnaean Society in 1797 and was a member of the Royal College of Surgeons.

Tupper was attached to the embassy under Sir Thomas Tyrwhitt and in 1813 to Emperor Alexander I of Russia who gave him an expensive finger ring worth 150 guineas. Tupper was appointed Surgeon Extraordinary to the Prince Regent in 1816. He obtained his M.D. from Marischal College in June 1817. He moved to Paris in 1817.

His younger brothers were Martin, Peter and Thomas Tupper.

== An Essay on the Probability of Sensation in Vegetables ==
In 1811, Tupper authored An Essay on the Probability of Sensation in Vegetables which argued that plants possess a form of instinct (to account for spontaneous movements), irritability and a low form of sensation. He argued that plants demonstrate their instincts when they turn towards sunlight, climb up trees or attach themselves to objects. Tupper was influenced by the great chain of being and believed that animals, humans and plants are all suffused with instinct.

Tupper believed that plants grow towards the sunlight because they actively seek its beneficial effects and that a plant's reaction to cold weather is best explained by instinct rather than mechanics. He used the example of a water lily raising and lowering its stalks at different times of the day as an example of instinct whilst others such as Smith and Carl Linnaeus explained the cause of motion as a mechanical effect. Tupper also described night-time motions of 'sleeping' plants such as closing their petals or folding themselves up in their calices as evidence of instinct in plants. This idea was supported by other naturalists of the period including Erasmus Darwin who went as far to claim that sleep in plants indicated volition.

Tupper commented that as "sensation does exist in animals independently of those eminent attributes with which it is combined in our natures as rational agents, may we not reasonably infer that vegetables have likewise their share of sensitive power, and consequently the means of enjoying their existence?". Tupper theorized that a nervous system may exist in plants, housed in a yet undetected organ. He used anatomical dissection to search for a plant nervous system but was unsuccessful.

Tupper thought that a benevolent Creator would "bestow upon vegetables a capacity to enjoy their own state of life". He has been cited as an early botanist "attracted to the notion that the ability of plants to feel pain or pleasure demonstrated the universal beneficence of a Creator".

== Death ==
Tupper died in Boulogne-sur-Mer, aged 78.

== Selected publications ==
- An Essay on the Probability of Sensation in Vegetables (1811)
- An Inquiry into Dr. Gall's System (1819)
