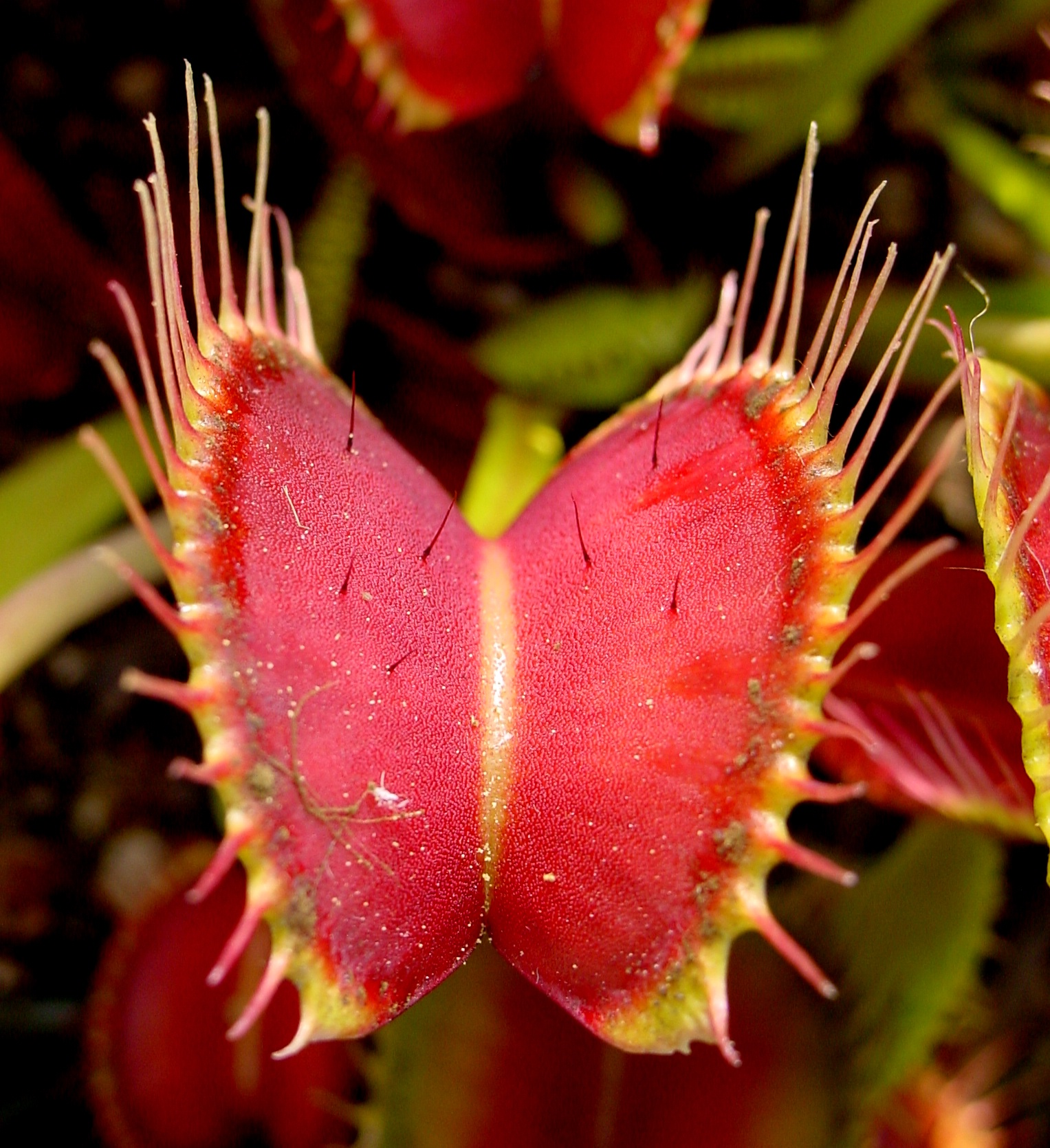
- Leaf

Conservation status
- Vulnerable (IUCN 2.3)
- CITES Appendix II (Note: Subject to CITES Annotation #4)

Scientific classification
- Kingdom: Plantae
- Clade: Tracheophytes
- Clade: Angiosperms
- Clade: Eudicots
- Order: Caryophyllales
- Family: Droseraceae
- Genus: Dionaea; Sol. ex J.Ellis 1768
- Species: D. muscipula

Binomial name
- Dionaea muscipula J.Ellis
- Distribution

Synonyms
- Dionea Raf., spelling variant; Dionaea corymbosa (Raf.) Steud. (1840); Dionaea crinita Sol. (1990) as synonym; Dionaea dentata D'Amato (1998) name published without description; Dionaea heterodoxa D'Amato (1998) nom.nud.; Dionaea muscicapa St.Hil. (1824) sphalm.typogr.; Dionaea sensitiva Salisb. (1796); Dionaea sessiliflora (Raf.) Steud. (1840); Dionaea uniflora (Raf.) Steud. (1840); Drosera corymbosa Raf. (1833); Drosera sessiliflora Raf. (1833); Drosera uniflora Raf. (1833)

= Venus flytrap =

Species of carnivorous plant

The Venus flytrap (Dionaea muscipula) is a carnivorous plant native to the temperate and subtropical wetlands of North Carolina and South Carolina, on the East Coast of the United States. Although various modern hybrids have been created in cultivation, D. muscipula is the only species of the monotypic genus Dionaea. It is closely related to the waterwheel plant (Aldrovanda vesiculosa) and the cosmopolitan sundews (Drosera), all of which belong to the family Droseraceae. Dionaea catches its prey—chiefly insects and arachnids—with a "jaw"-like clamping structure, which is formed by the terminal portion of each of the plant's leaves; when an insect makes contact with the open leaves, vibrations from the prey's movements ultimately trigger the "jaws" to shut via tiny hairs (called "trigger hairs" or "sensitive hairs") on their inner surfaces. Additionally, when an insect or spider touches one of these hairs, the trap prepares to close, only fully enclosing the prey if a second hair is contacted within (approximately) twenty seconds of the first contact. Triggers may occur as quickly as 1/10 of a second from initial contact.

The requirement of repeated, seemingly redundant triggering in this mechanism serves as a safeguard against energy loss and to avoid trapping objects with no nutritional value; the plant will only begin digestion after five more stimuli are activated, ensuring that it has caught a live prey animal worthy of consumption. These hairs also possess a heat sensor. A forest fire, for example, causes them to snap shut, making the plant more resilient to periods of summer fires.

Although widely cultivated for sale, the population of the Venus flytrap has been rapidly declining in its native range. As of 2017, the species was under Endangered Species Act review by the U.S. Fish & Wildlife Service.

== Etymology ==
The plant's common name (originally "Venus's flytrap") refers to Venus, the Roman goddess of love, beauty, desire, sex, fertility, prosperity, victory, and women.

The genus name, Dionaea ("daughter of Dione"), refers to an epithet of the Greek goddess Aphrodite, while the species name, muscipula, is Latin for both "mousetrap" and "flytrap". The Latin word muscipula ("mousetrap") is derived from mus ("mouse") and decipula ("trap"), while the homonym word muscipula ("flytrap") is derived from musca ("fly") and decipula. In any case, by consequence, the name Dionaea muscipula translates to "Dione's trap" or "Aphrodite's trap".

Historically, the plant was also known by the slang term "tipitiwitchet" or "tippity twitchet", possibly an oblique reference to the plant's resemblance to human female genitalia. The term is similar to the term tippet-de-witchet which derives from tippet (a wrapping piece of clothing) and witchet (archaic term for vagina). In contrast, the English botanist John Ellis, who gave the plant its scientific name in 1768, wrote that the plant name tippitywichit was an indigenous word from either Cherokee or Catawba. The plant name according to the Handbook of American Indians derives from the Renape word titipiwitshik ("they (leaves) which wind around (or involve)"), referring to the plant's leaves which wrap and trap its prey.

== Discovery by Europeans ==
On 2 April 1759, the North Carolina colonial governor, Arthur Dobbs, penned the first written description of the plant in a letter to English botanist Peter Collinson. In the letter he wrote: "We have a kind of Catch Fly Sensitive which closes upon anything that touches it. It grows in Latitude 34 but not in 35. I will try to save the seed here." A year later, Dobbs went into greater detail about the plant in a letter to Collinson dated Brunswick, 24 January 1760.

The great wonder of the vegetable kingdom is a very curious unknown species of Sensitive. It is a dwarf plant. The leaves are like a narrow segment of a sphere, consisting of two parts, like the cap of a spring purse, the concave part outwards, each of which falls back with indented edges (like an iron spring fox-trap); upon anything touching the leaves, or falling between them, they instantly close like a spring trap, and confine any insect or anything that falls between them. It bears a white flower. To this surprising plant I have given the name of Fly trap Sensitive.

— Arthur Dobbs

This was the first detailed recorded notice of the plant by Europeans. The description was before John Ellis's letter to The London Magazine on 1 September 1768, and his letter to Carl Linnaeus on 23 September 1768, in which he described the plant and proposed its English name Venus's Flytrap and scientific name Dionaea muscipula.

== Description ==
The Venus flytrap is a small plant whose structure can be described as a rosette of four to seven leaves, which arise from a short subterranean stem that is actually a bulb-like object. Each stem reaches a maximum size of about three to ten centimeters, depending on the time of year; longer leaves with robust traps are usually formed after flowering. Flytraps that have more than seven leaves are colonies formed by rosettes that have divided beneath the ground.

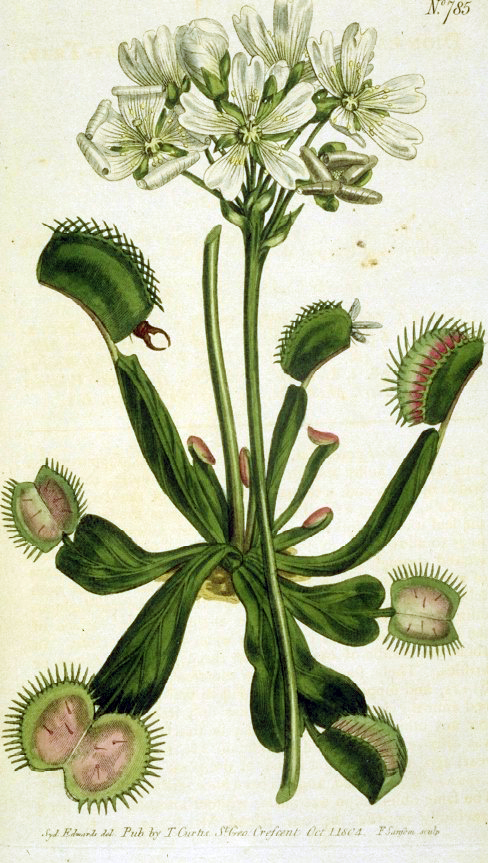
Illustration from Curtis's Botanical Magazine by William Curtis (1746–1799)

=== Fly trap leaves ===
The leaf blade is divided into two regions: a flat, heart-shaped photosynthesis-capable petiole, and a pair of terminal lobes hinged at the midrib, forming the trap which is the true leaf. The upper surface of these lobes contains red anthocyanin pigments and its edges secrete mucilage. The lobes exhibit rapid plant movements, snapping shut when stimulated by prey. The trapping mechanism is tripped when prey contacts one of the three hair-like trichomes that are found on the upper surface of each of the lobes; this stimulates an electrical impulse across both lobes of the trap, held under strain by rigid cells in the epidermis. The current causes these cells suddenly to soften, whereupon the strain releases and the lobes close. The mechanism is so highly specialized that it can distinguish between living prey and non-prey stimuli, such as falling raindrops; two trigger hairs must be touched in succession within 20 seconds of each other or one hair touched twice in rapid succession, whereupon the lobes of the trap will snap shut, typically in about one-tenth of a second. The edges of the lobes are fringed by stiff hair-like protrusions or cilia, which mesh together and prevent large prey from escaping. These protrusions, and the trigger hairs (also known as sensitive hairs) are likely homologous with the tentacles found in this plant's close relatives, the sundews. Scientists have concluded that the snap trap evolved from a fly-paper trap similar to that of Drosera.

The holes in the meshwork allow small prey to escape, presumably because the benefit that would be obtained from them would be less than the cost of digesting them. If the prey is too small and escapes, the trap will usually reopen within 12 hours. If the prey moves around in the trap, it tightens and digestion begins more quickly.

Speed of closing can vary depending on the amount of humidity, light, size of prey, and general growing conditions. The speed with which traps close can be used as an indicator of a plant's general health. Venus flytraps are not as humidity-dependent as are some other carnivorous plants, such as Nepenthes, Cephalotus, most Heliamphora, and some Drosera.

The Venus flytrap exhibits variations in petiole shape and length and whether the leaf lies flat on the ground or extends up at an angle of about 40–60 degrees. The four major forms are: 'typica', the most common, with broad decumbent petioles; 'erecta', with leaves at a 45-degree angle; 'linearis', with narrow petioles and leaves at 45 degrees; and 'filiformis', with extremely narrow or linear petioles. Except for 'filiformis', all of these can be stages in leaf production of any plant depending on season (decumbent in summer versus short versus semi-erect in spring), length of photoperiod (long petioles in spring versus short in summer), and intensity of light (wide petioles in low light intensity versus narrow in brighter light).

=== Other parts ===
The plant also has a flower on top of a long stem, about 6 inches (15 cm) long. The flower is pollinated from various flying insects such as sweat bees, longhorn beetles and checkered beetles.

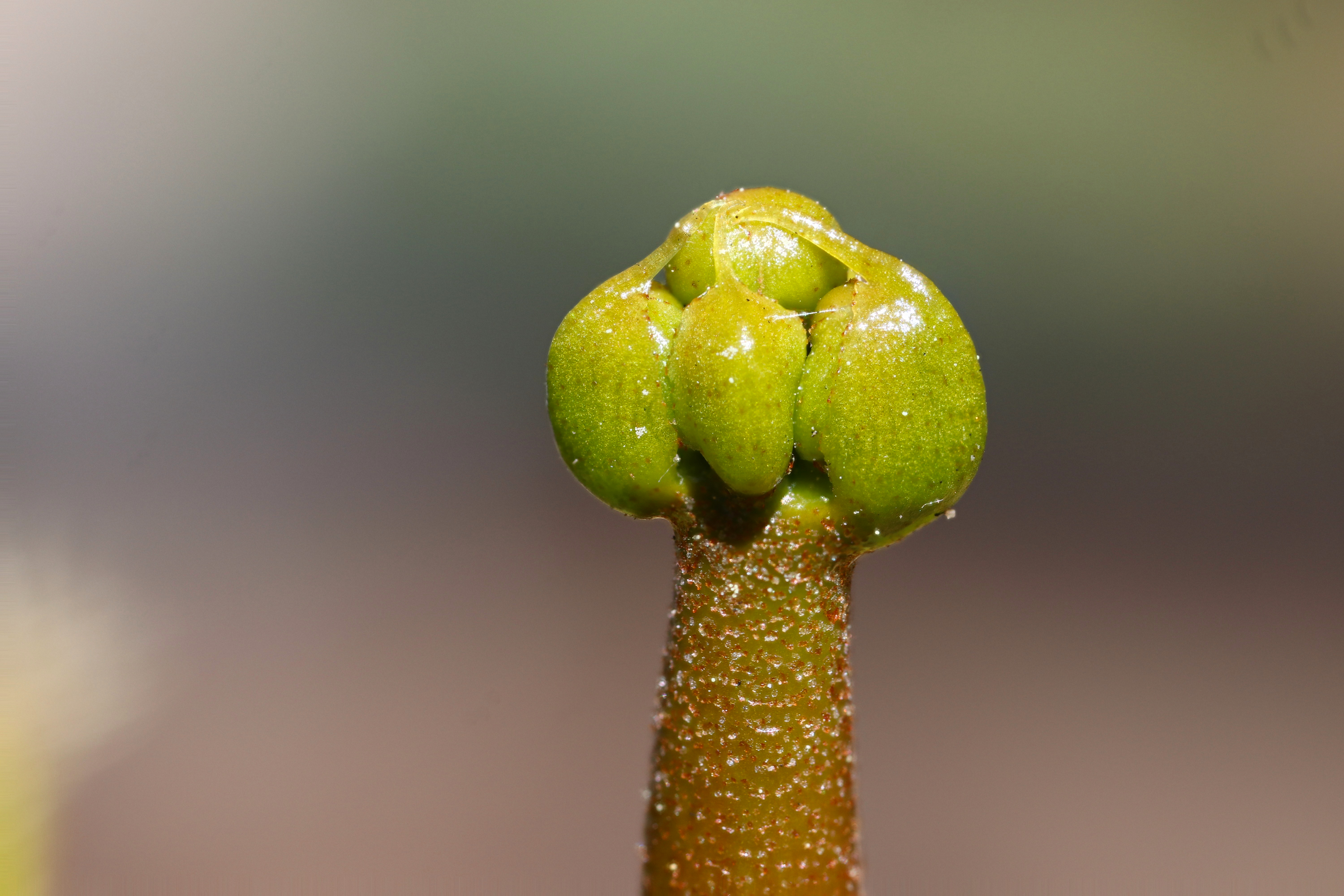
Venus flytrap flower bud

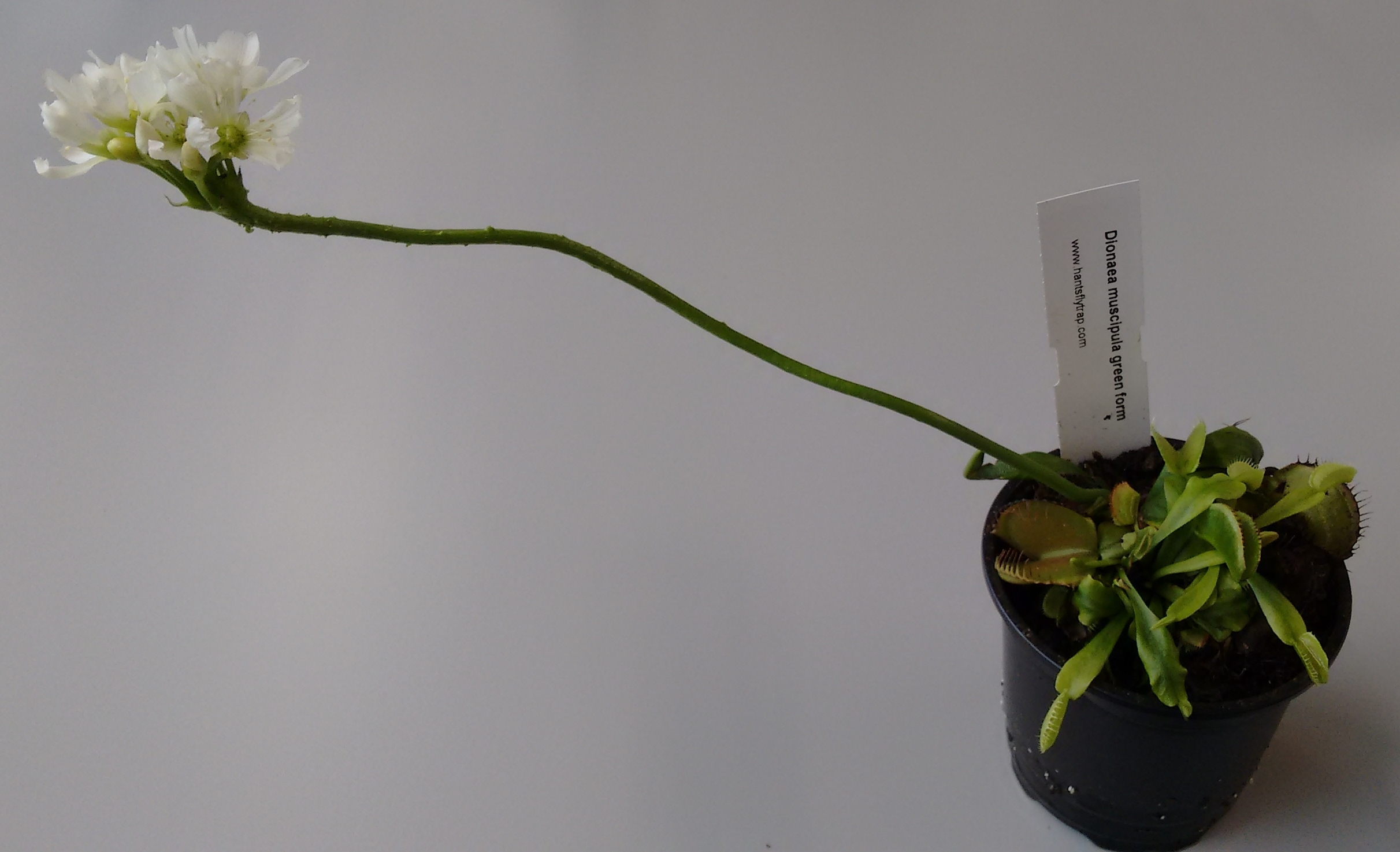
Flowering Venus flytrap showing its long flower stem

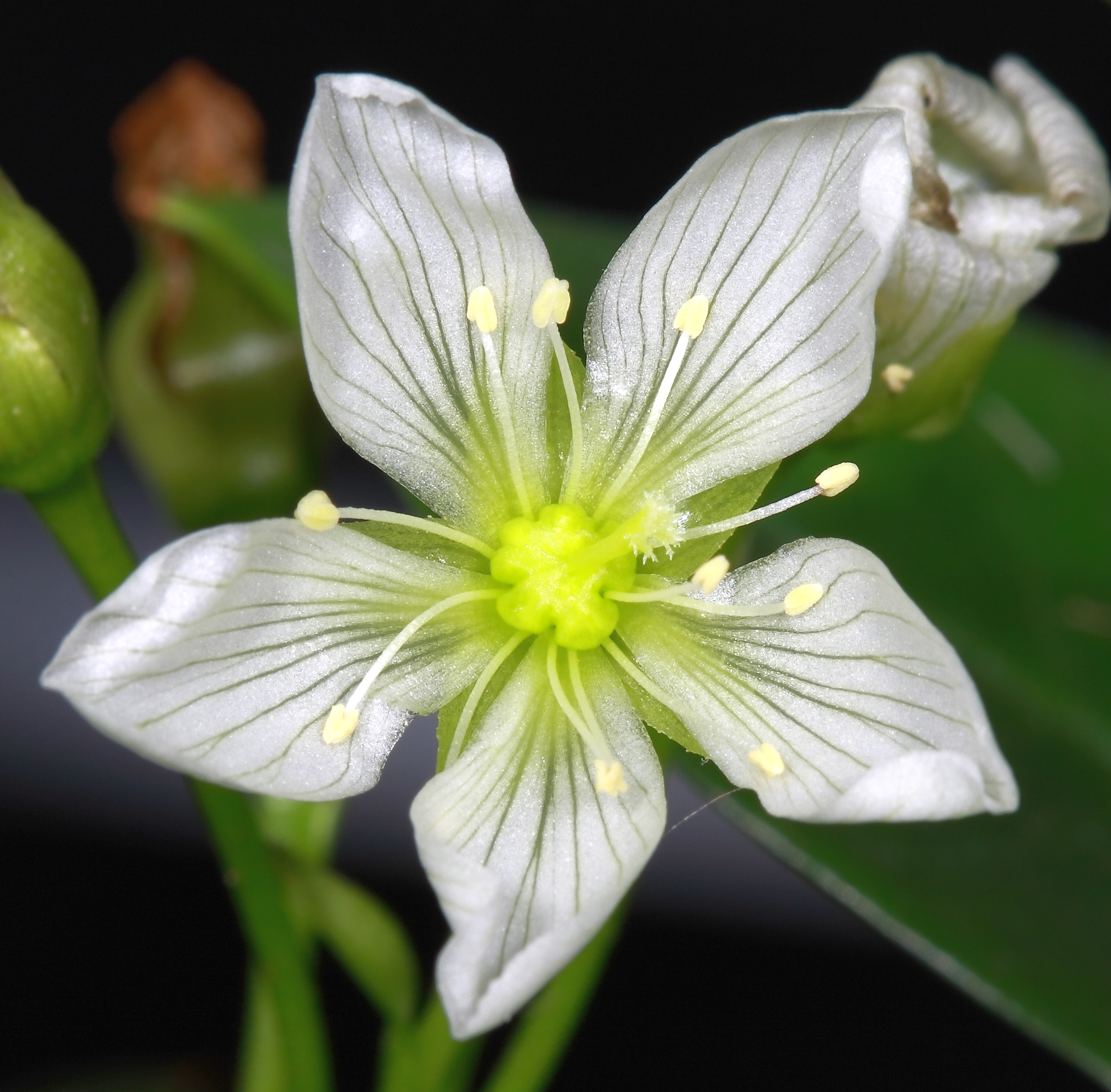
Closeup of flower (c. 20 mm in diameter)

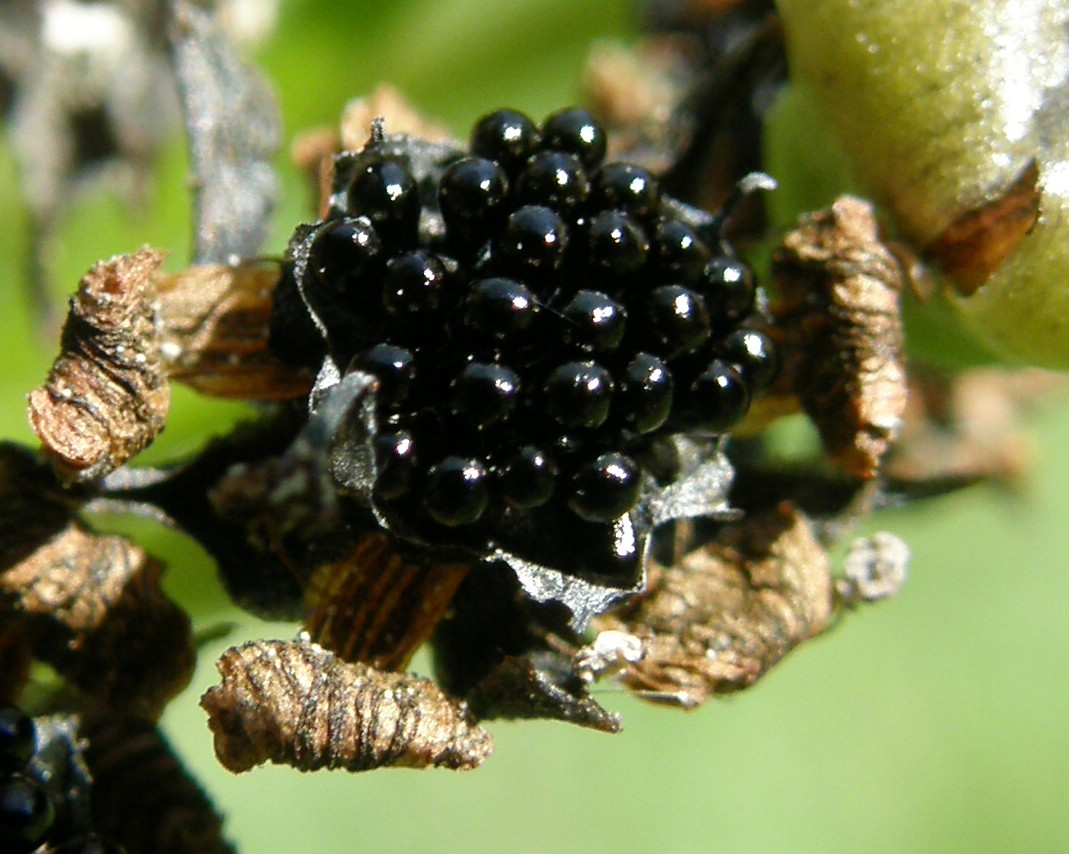
The species produces small, shiny black seeds.

== Habitat and distribution ==
=== Habitat ===
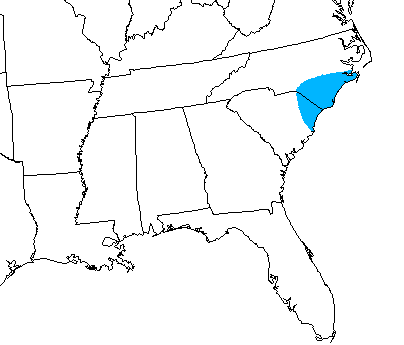
Map of the original distribution of the Venus flytrap

The Venus flytrap is found in nitrogen- and phosphorus-poor environments, such as bogs, wet savannahs, and canebrakes. Small in stature and slow-growing, the Venus flytrap tolerates fire well and depends on periodic burning to suppress its competition. It survives in wet sandy and peaty soils. Although it has been successfully transplanted and grown in many locales around the world, it is native only to the coastal bogs of North and South Carolina in the United States, specifically within a 100-kilometer (62-mile) radius of Wilmington, North Carolina. One such place is North Carolina's Green Swamp. There also appears to be a naturalized population of Venus flytraps in northern Florida as well as an introduced population in western Washington. The nutritional poverty of the soil is the reason it relies on such elaborate traps: insect prey provide the nitrogen for protein formation that the soil cannot. They tolerate mild winters, and require a period of winter dormancy to survive freezing temperatures and low photoperiods. Most professional carnivorous plant growers recommend dormancy, and Venus fly traps grown without dormancy may require more light, water, and food to remain healthy.

They are full sun plants, usually found only in areas with less than 10% canopy cover. The habitats where it thrives are typically either too nutrient-poor for many noncarnivorous plants to survive, or frequently disturbed by fires which regularly clear vegetation and prevent a shady overstory from developing. It can be found living alongside herbaceous plants, grasses, sphagnum, and fire-dependent Arundinaria bamboos. Regular fire disturbance is an important part of its habitat, required every 3–5 years in most places for D. muscipula to thrive. After fire, D. muscipula seeds germinate well in ash and sandy soil, with seedlings growing well in the open post-fire conditions. The seeds germinate immediately without a dormant period.

=== Distribution ===
Dionaea muscipula occurs naturally only along the coastal plain of North and South Carolina in the U.S., with all known current sites within 90 km (56 mi) of Wilmington, North Carolina. A 1958 survey of herbaria specimens and old documents found 259 sites where the historical record documented the presence of D. muscipula, within 21 counties in North and South Carolina. As of 2019, it was considered extirpated in North Carolina in the inland counties of Moore, Robeson, and Lenoir, as well as the South Carolina coastal counties of Charleston and Georgetown. Remaining extant populations exist in North Carolina in Beaufort, Craven, Pamlico, Carteret, Jones, Onslow, Duplin, Pender, New Hanover, Brunswick, Columbus, Bladen, Sampson, Cumberland, and Hoke counties, and in South Carolina in Horry county.

=== Population ===
A large-scale survey in 2019, conducted by the North Carolina Natural Heritage Program, counted a total of 163,951 individual Venus flytraps in North Carolina and 4,876 in South Carolina, estimating a total of 302,000 individuals remaining in the wild in its native range. This represents a reduction of more than 93% from a 1979 estimate of approximately 4,500,000 individuals. A 1958 study found 259 confirmed extant or historic sites. As of 2016, there were 71 known sites where the plant could be found in the wild. Of these 71 sites, only 20 were classified as having excellent or good long-term viability.

== Carnivory ==
A closing trap

=== Prey selectivity ===
A time lapse showing Venus flytrap catching prey (see more videos here)

Most carnivorous plants selectively feed on specific prey. This selection is due to the available prey and the type of trap used by the organism. With the Venus flytrap, prey is limited to beetles, spiders and other crawling arthropods. The Dionaea diet is 33% ants, 30% spiders, 10% beetles, and 10% grasshoppers, with fewer than 5% flying insects.

Given that Dionaea evolved from an ancestral form of Drosera (carnivorous plants that use a sticky trap instead of a snap trap) the reason for this evolutionary branching becomes clear. Drosera consume smaller, aerial insects, whereas Dionaea consume larger terrestrial bugs. Dionaea are able to extract more nutrients from these larger bugs. This gives Dionaea an evolutionary advantage over their ancestral sticky trap form.

=== Mechanism of trapping ===
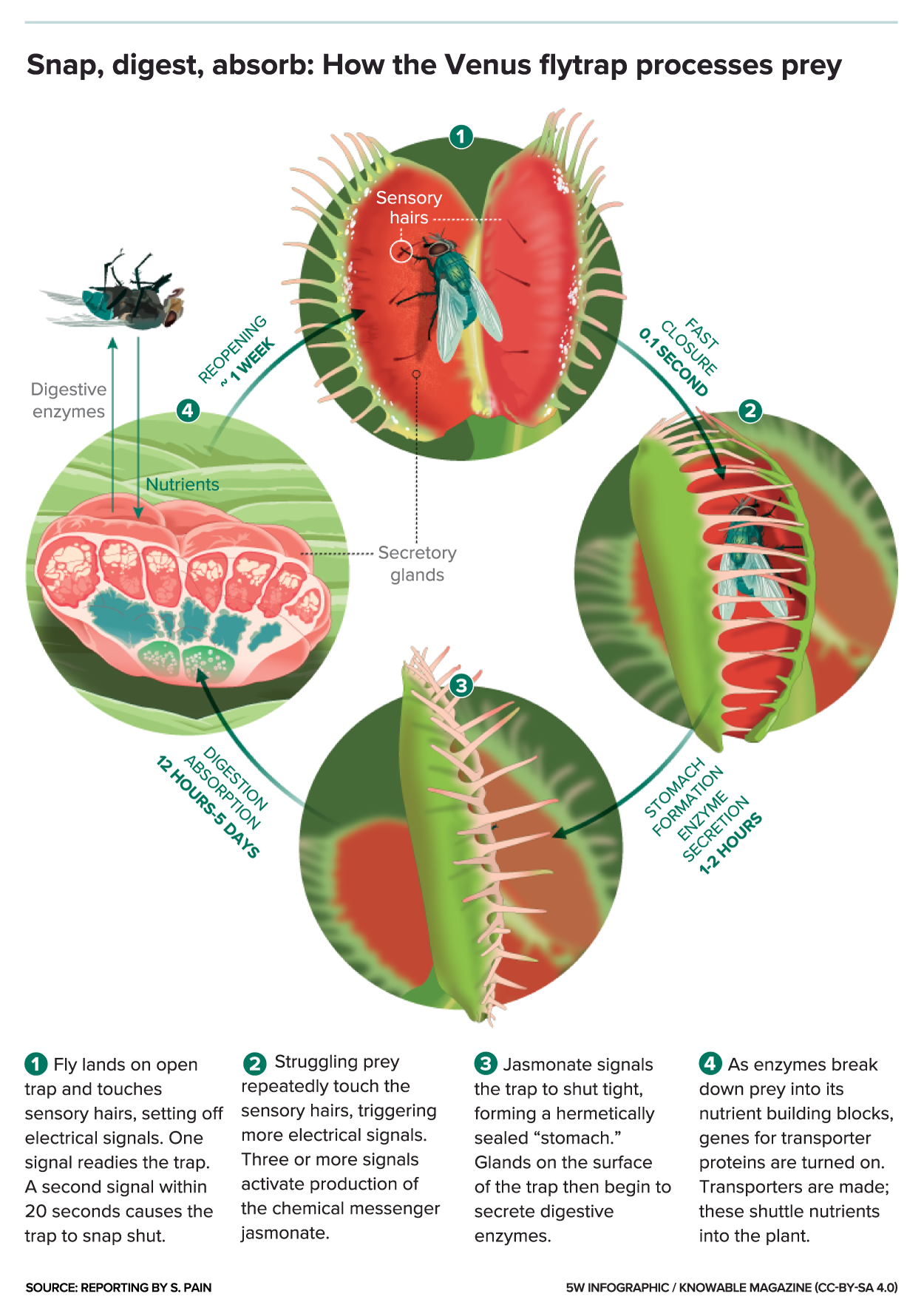
Stages and timing of the Venus flytrap carnivory process, Knowable Magazine

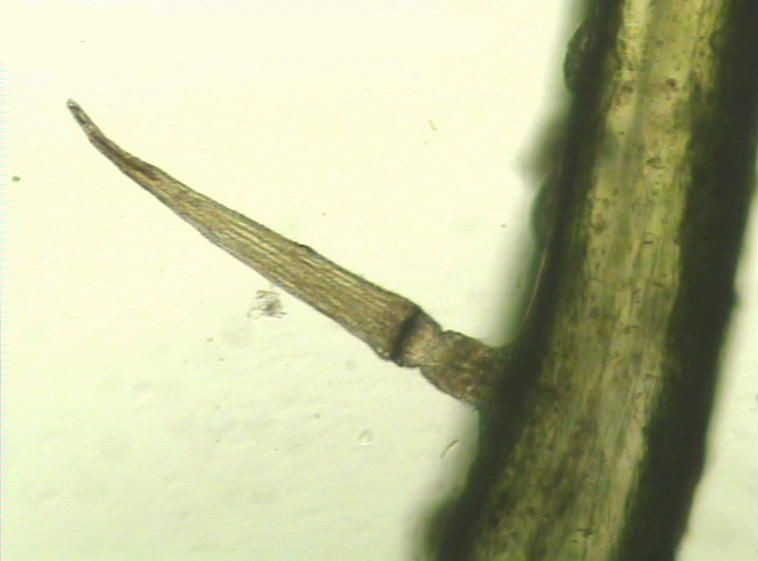
Closeup of one of the hinged trigger hairs

The Venus flytrap is one of a very small group of plants capable of rapid movement, such as Mimosa pudica, the telegraph plant, starfruit, sundews and bladderworts.

The mechanism by which the trap snaps shut involves a complex interaction between elasticity, turgor and growth. The trap only shuts when there have been two stimulations of the trigger hairs; this is to avoid inadvertent triggering of the mechanism by dust and other wind-borne debris. In the open, untripped state, the lobes are convex (bent outwards), but in the closed state, the lobes are concave (forming a cavity). It is the rapid flipping of this bistable state that closes the trap, but the mechanism by which this occurs is still poorly understood. When the trigger hairs are stimulated, an action potential (mostly involving calcium ions—see calcium in biology) is generated, which propagates across the lobes and stimulates cells in the lobes and in the midrib between them.

It is hypothesized that there is a threshold of ion buildup for the Venus flytrap to react to stimulation. The acid growth theory states that individual cells in the outer layers of the lobes and midrib rapidly move ^{1}H^{+} (hydrogen ions) into their cell walls, lowering the pH and loosening the extracellular components, which allows them to swell rapidly by osmosis, thus elongating and changing the shape of the trap lobe. Alternatively, cells in the inner layers of the lobes and midrib may rapidly secrete other ions, allowing water to follow by osmosis, and the cells to collapse. Both of these mechanisms may play a role and have some experimental evidence to support them. Flytraps show an example of memory in plants; the plant knows if one of its trigger hairs have been touched, and remembers this for a few seconds. If a second touch occurs during that time frame, the flytrap closes. After closing, the flytrap counts additional stimulations of the trigger hairs, to five total, to start the production of digesting enzymes.

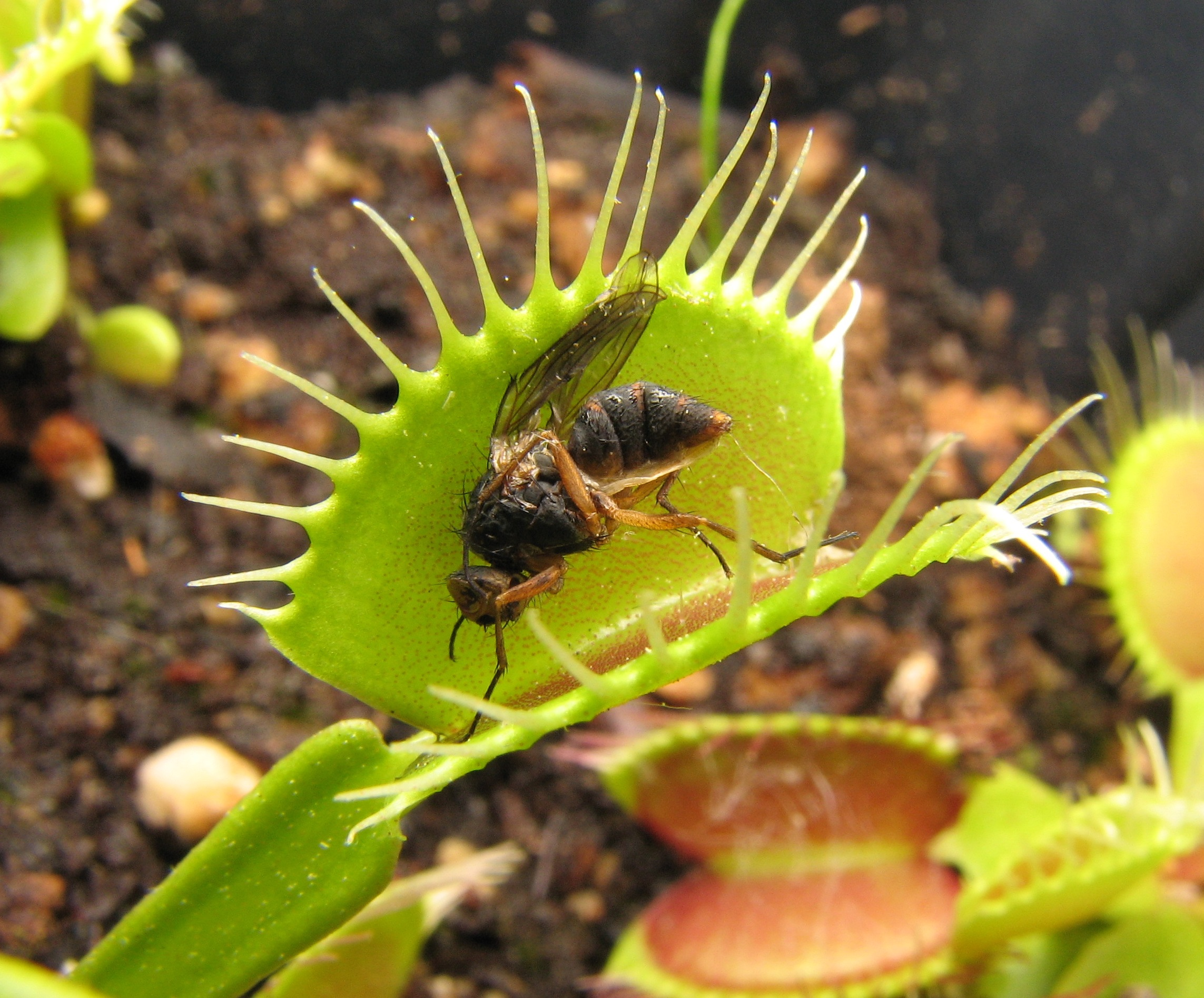
Muscoid fly

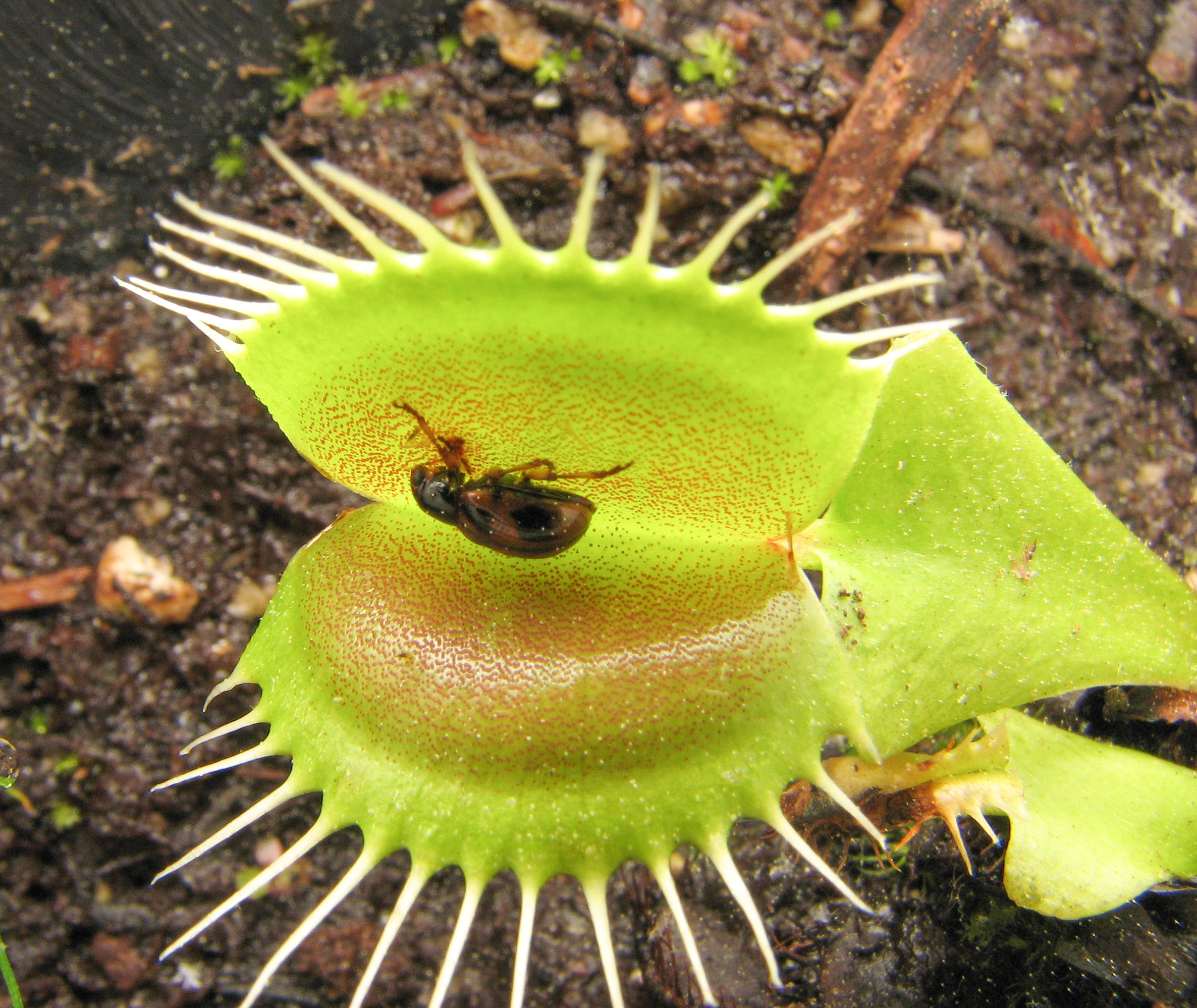
Chrysomelid beetle, Paria

=== Digestion ===
If the prey is unable to escape, it will continue to stimulate the inner surface of the lobes, and this causes a further growth response that forces the edges of the lobes together, eventually sealing the trap hermetically and forming a "stomach" in which digestion occurs. Release of the digestive enzymes is controlled by the hormone jasmonic acid, the same hormone that triggers the release of toxins as an anti-herbivore defense mechanism in non-carnivorous plants. (See Evolution below) Once the digestive glands in the leaf lobes have been activated, digestion is catalysed by hydrolase enzymes secreted by the glands. One of these enzymes includes GH18 chitinase, which breaks down chitin-containing exoskeleton of trapped insects. Synthesis of this enzyme begins with at least five action potentials, which will stimulate transcription of chitinase.

Oxidative protein modification is likely to be a pre-digestive mechanism used by Dionaea muscipula. Aqueous leaf extracts have been found to contain quinones such as the naphthoquinone plumbagin that couples to different NADH-dependent diaphorases to produce superoxide and hydrogen peroxide upon autoxidation. Such oxidative modification could rupture animal cell membranes. Plumbagin is known to induce apoptosis, associated with the regulation of the Bcl-2 family of proteins. When the Dionaea extracts were pre-incubated with diaphorases and NADH in the presence of serum albumin (SA), subsequent tryptic digestion of SA was facilitated. Since the secretory glands of Droseraceae contain proteases and possibly other degradative enzymes, it may be that the presence of oxygen-activating redox cofactors function as extracellular pre-digestive oxidants to render membrane-bound proteins of the prey (insects) more susceptible to proteolytic attacks.

Digestion takes about ten days, after which the prey is reduced to a husk of chitin. The trap then reopens, and is ready for reuse.

== Evolution ==
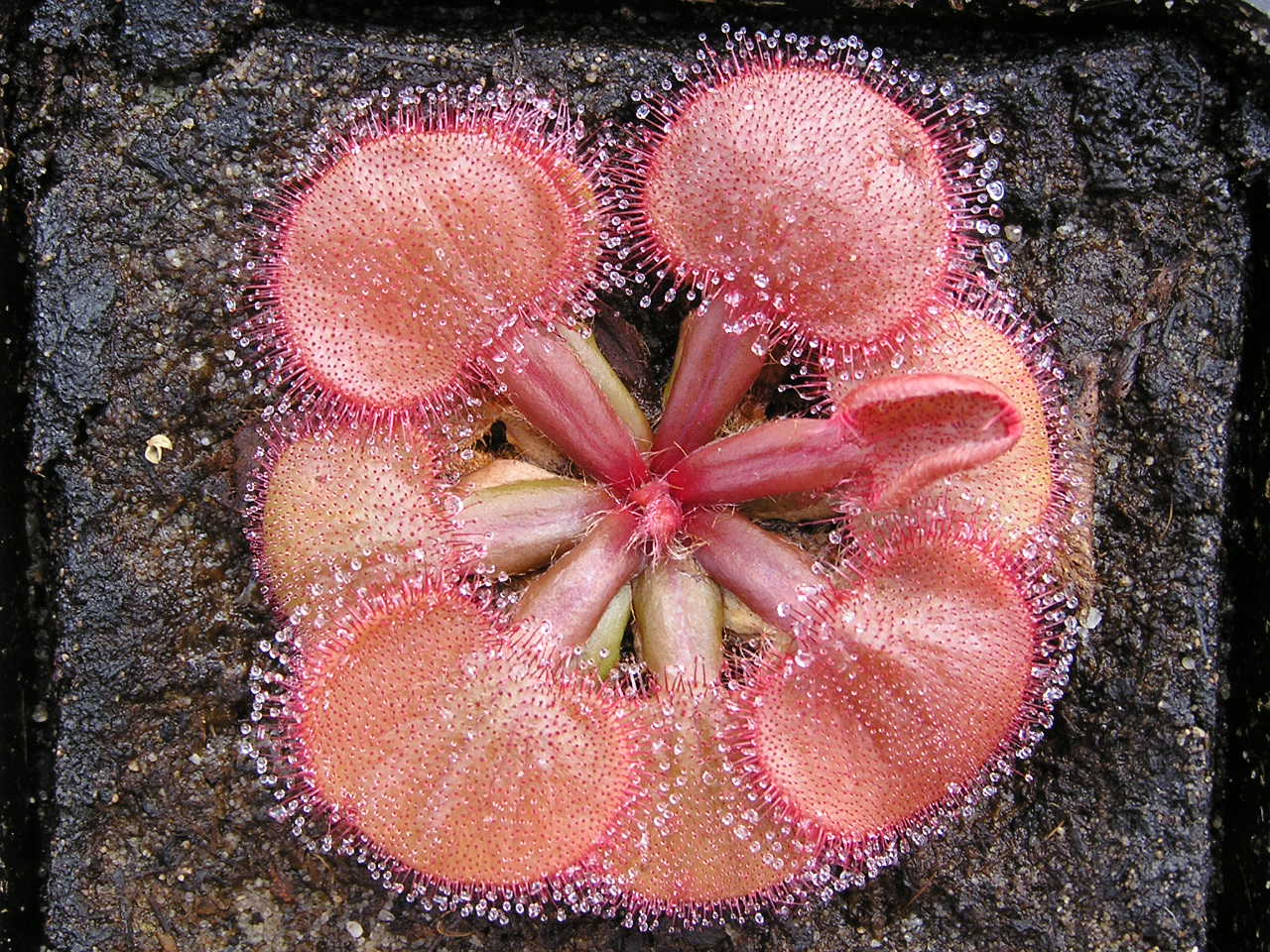
Drosera falconeri, with short, wide, sticky leaf traps

Carnivory in plants is a very specialized form of foliar feeding, and is an adaptation found in several plants that grow in nutrient-poor soil. Carnivorous traps were naturally selected to allow these organisms to compensate for the nutrient deficiencies of their harsh environments and compensate for the reduced photosynthetic benefit. Phylogenetic studies have shown that carnivory in plants is a common adaptation in habitats with abundant sunlight and water but scarce nutrients. Carnivory has evolved independently six times in the angiosperms based on extant species, with likely many more carnivorous plant lineages now extinct.

The "snap trap" mechanism characteristic of Dionaea is shared with only one other carnivorous plant genus, Aldrovanda. For most of the 20th century, this relationship was thought to be coincidental, more precisely an example of convergent evolution. Some phylogenetic studies even suggested that the closest living relatives of Aldrovanda were the sundews. It was not until 2002 that a molecular evolutionary study, by analyzing combined nuclear and chloroplast DNA sequences, indicated that Dionaea and Aldrovanda were closely related and that the snap trap mechanism evolved only once in a common ancestor of the two genera.

A 2009 study presented evidence for the evolution of snap traps of Dionaea and Aldrovanda from a flypaper trap like Drosera regia, based on molecular data. The molecular and physiological data imply that Dionaea and Aldrovanda snap traps evolved from the flypaper traps of a common ancestor with Drosera. Pre-adaptations to the evolution of snap traps were identified in several species of Drosera, such as rapid leaf and tentacle movement. The model proposes that plant carnivory by snap trap evolved from the flypaper traps, driven by increasing prey size. Bigger prey provides greater nutritional value, but large insects can easily escape the sticky mucilage of flypaper traps; the evolution of snap traps would therefore prevent escape and kleptoparasitism (theft of prey captured by the plant before it can derive benefit from it), and would also permit a more complete digestion.

In 2016, a study of the expression of genes in the plant's leaves as they captured and digested prey was published in the journal Genome Research. The gene activation observed in the leaves of the plants gives support to the hypothesis that the carnivorous mechanisms present in the flytrap are a specially adapted version of mechanisms used by non-carnivorous plants to defend against herbivorous insects. In many non-carnivorous plants, jasmonic acid serves as a signaling molecule for the activation of defense mechanisms, such as the production of hydrolases, which can destroy chitin and other molecular components of insect and microbial pests. In the Venus flytrap, this same molecule has been found to be responsible for the activation of the plant's digestive glands. A few hours after the capture of prey, another set of genes is activated inside the glands, the same set of genes that is active in the roots of other plants, allowing them to absorb nutrients. The use of similar biological pathways in the traps as non-carnivorous plants use for other purposes indicates that somewhere in its evolutionary history, the Venus flytrap repurposed these genes to facilitate carnivory.

=== Proposed evolutionary history ===
Carnivorous plants are generally herbaceous, and their traps the result of primary growth. They generally do not form readily fossilizable structures such as thick bark or wood. As a result, there is no fossil evidence of the steps that might link Dionaea and Aldrovanda, or either genus with their common ancestor, Drosera. Nevertheless, it is possible to infer an evolutionary history based on phylogenetic studies of both genera. Researchers have proposed a series of steps that would ultimately result in the complex snap-trap mechanism:

- Larger insects usually walk over the plant, instead of flying to it, and are more likely to break free from sticky glands alone. Therefore, a plant with wider leaves, like Drosera falconeri, must have adapted to move the trap and its stalks in directions that maximized its chance of capturing and retaining such prey—in this particular case, longitudinally. Once adequately "wrapped", escape would be more difficult.
- Evolutionary pressure then selected for plants with shorter response time, in a manner similar to Drosera burmanni or Drosera glanduligera. The faster the closing, the less reliant on the flypaper model the plant would be.
- As the trap became more and more active, the energy required to "wrap" the prey increased. Plants that could somehow differentiate between actual insects and random detritus/rain droplets would have an advantage, thus explaining the specialization of inner tentacles into trigger hairs.
- Ultimately, as the plant relied more on closing around the insect rather than gluing them to the leaf surface, the tentacles so evident in Drosera would lose their original function altogether, becoming the "teeth" and trigger hairs—an example of natural selection utilizing pre-existing structures for new functions.
- Completing the transition, the plant eventually developed the depressed digestive glands found inside the trap, rather than using the dews in the stalks, further differentiating it from genus Drosera.

Phylogenetic studies using molecular characters place the emergence of carnivory in the ancestors of Dionaea muscipula to 85.6 million years ago, and the development of the snap-trap in the ancestors of Dionaea and its sister genus Aldrovanda to approximately 48 million years ago.

== Cultivation ==
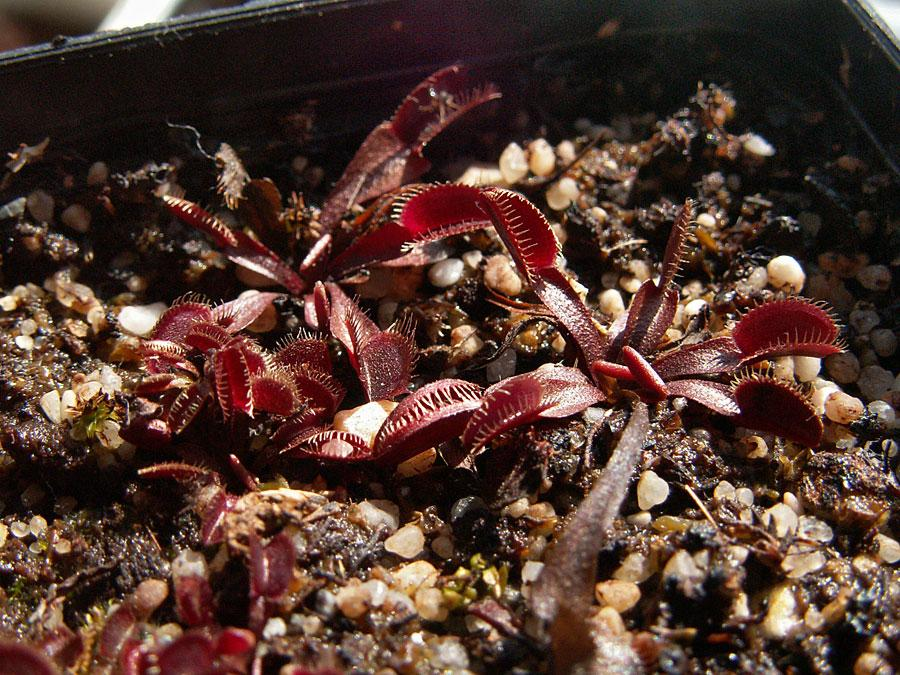
Dionaea muscipula 'Akai Ryu', Japanese for 'Red Dragon', in cultivation

Plants can be propagated by seed, taking around four to five years to reach maturity. More commonly, they are propagated by clonal division in spring or summer. Venus flytraps can also be propagated in vitro using plant tissue culture. Most Venus flytraps found for sale in nurseries garden centers have been produced using this method, as this is the most cost-effective way to propagate them on a large scale. Regardless of the propagation method used, the plants will live for 20 to 30 years if cultivated in the right conditions.

=== Cultivars ===
Venus flytraps are by far the most commonly recognized and cultivated carnivorous plant, and they are frequently sold as houseplants. Various cultivars (cultivated varieties) have come into the market through tissue culture of selected genetic mutations, and these plants are raised in large quantities for commercial markets. The cultivars 'Akai Ryu' and 'South West Giant' have gained the Royal Horticultural Society's Award of Garden Merit.

== Conservation ==
Although widely cultivated for sale as a houseplant, D. muscipula has suffered a significant decline in its population in the wild. The population in its native range is estimated to have decreased 93% since 1979.

=== Status ===
The species is under Endangered Species Act review by the U.S. Fish & Wildlife Service. The current review commenced in 2018, after an initial "90-day" review found that action may be warranted. A previous review in 1993 resulted in a determination that the plant was a "Potential candidate without sufficient data on vulnerability". The IUCN Red List classifies the species as "vulnerable". The State of North Carolina lists Dionaea muscipula as a species of "Special Concern–Vulnerable". The species is protected under Appendix II of the Convention on International Trade in Endangered Species (CITES) meaning international trade (including in parts and derivatives) is regulated by the CITES permitting system. NatureServe classified it as "Imperiled" (G2) in a 2018 review.

The U.S. Fish and Wildlife Service has not indicated a timeline to conclude its current review of Dionaea muscipula. The Endangered Species Act specifies a two-year timeline for a species review. However, the species listing process takes 12.1 years on average.

=== Threats ===
The Venus flytrap is only found in the wild in a very particular set of conditions, requiring flat land with moist, acidic, nutrient-poor soils that receive full sun and burn frequently in forest fires, and is therefore sensitive to many types of disturbance. A 2011 review identified five categories of threats for the species: agriculture, road-building, biological resource use (poaching and lumber activities), natural systems modifications (drainage and fire suppression), and pollution (fertilizer).

Habitat loss is a major threat to the species. The human population of the coastal Carolinas is rapidly expanding. For example, Brunswick County, North Carolina, which has the largest number of Venus flytrap populations, has seen a 27% increase in its human population from 2010 to 2018. As the population grows, residential and commercial development and road building directly eliminate flytrap habitat, while site preparation that entails ditching and draining can dry out soil in surrounding areas, destroying the viability of the species. Additionally, increased recreational use of natural areas in populated areas directly destroys the plants by crushing or uprooting them.

Fire suppression is another threat to the Venus flytrap. In the absence of regular fires, shrubs and trees encroach, outcompeting the species and leading to local extirpations. D. muscipula requires fire every 3–5 years, and best thrives with annual brush fires. Although flytraps and their seeds are typically killed alongside their competition in fires, seeds from flytraps adjacent to the burnt zone propagate quickly in the ash and full sun conditions that occur after a fire disturbance. Because the mature plants and new seedlings are typically destroyed in the regular fires that are necessary to maintain their habitat, D. muscipula's survival relies upon adequate seed production and dispersal from outside the burnt patches back into the burnt habitat, requiring a critical mass of populations, and exposing the success of any one population to metapopulation dynamics. These dynamics make small, isolated populations particularly vulnerable to extirpation, for if there are no mature plants adjacent to the fire zone, there is no source of seeds post-fire.

Poaching has been another cause of population decline. Harvesting Venus flytraps on public land became illegal in North Carolina in 1958, and since then a legal cultivation industry has formed, growing tens of thousands of flytraps in commercial greenhouses for sale as household plants. Yet in 2016, the New York Times reported that demand for wild plants still exists, which "has led to a 'Venus flytrap crime ring.'" In 2014, the state of North Carolina made Venus flytrap poaching a felony. Since then, several poachers have been charged, with one man receiving 17 months in prison for poaching 970 Venus flytraps, and another man charged with 73 felony counts in 2019. Poachers may do greater harm to the wild populations than a simple count of individuals taken would indicate, as they may selectively harvest the largest plants at a site, which have more flowers and fruit and therefore generate more seeds than smaller plants.

Additionally, the species is particularly vulnerable to catastrophic climate events. Most Venus flytrap sites are only 2–4 meters (6.6–13.1 feet) above sea level and are located in a region prone to hurricanes, making storm surges and rising sea levels a long-term threat.

== Designations ==
In 2005, the Venus flytrap was designated as the state carnivorous plant of North Carolina.

== In alternative medicine ==
Venus flytrap extract is available on the market as an herbal remedy, sometimes as the prime ingredient of a patent medicine named "Carnivora". According to the American Cancer Society, these products are promoted in alternative medicine as a treatment for a variety of human ailments, including HIV, Crohn's disease and skin cancer, even though available scientific evidence does not support these health claims.

== See also ==
- Carnivorous plants of North America
- List of unproven and disproven cancer treatments
