= Plant intelligence =

Proposed cognition of plants

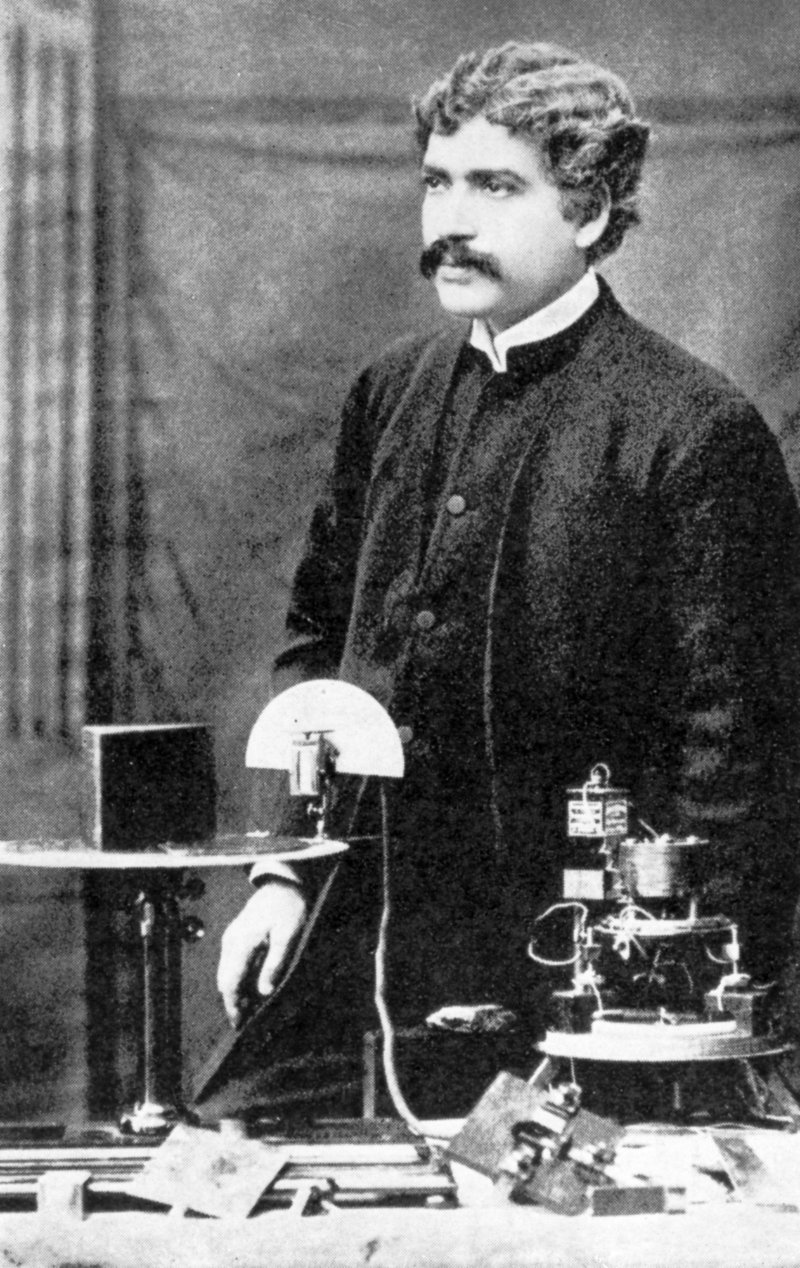
J. C. Bose has been described as the "father of plant neurobiology".

Plant intelligence is a field of plant biology which aims to understand how plants process the information they obtain from their environment. Plant intelligence has been defined as "any type of intentional and flexible behavior that is beneficial and enables the organism to achieve its goal".

Plant neurobiology is a subfield of plant intelligence research that claims plants possess abilities associated with cognition including anticipation, decision making, learning, and memory. Terminology used in plant neurobiology is rejected by the majority of plant scientists as misleading, as plants do not possess neurons or consciousness; thus the term plant gnosophysiology is infrequently used. Most plant scientists tend to avoid using the term "intelligence" to refer to plants in their published research, despite the rise of the term in popular science writing.

== History ==
=== Early research ===
In 1811, James Perchard Tupper authored An Essay on the Probability of Sensation in Vegetables which argued that plants possess a low form of sensation, have sensitivity, and potentially have a nervous system. It was believed that thinkers like Tupper who believed in plant sensitivity credited God, who kindly designed all organisms with purpose.

The notion that plants are capable of feeling emotions was first recorded in 1848, when Gustav Fechner, an experimental psychologist, suggested that plants are capable of emotions and that one could promote healthy growth with talk, attention, attitude, and affection. Federico Delpino wrote about plant intelligence in 1867.

The idea of cognition in plants was explored by Charles Darwin in 1880 in the book The Power of Movement in Plants, co-authored with his son Francis. Using a neurological metaphor, he described the sensitivity of plant roots in proposing that the tip of roots acts like the brain of some lower animals. This involves reacting to sensation in order to determine their next movement. Darwin's "root-brain hypothesis" influenced those in the field of plant neurobiology many years later.

John Ellor Taylor in his 1884 book The Sagacity and Morality of Plants argued that plants are conscious agents. He says that, "there can be no life absolutely without psychological action — that the latter is the result of the former." He believed that plants possess a similar trait to instinct in animals which is gaining experience and passing down those experiences to descendants.

In 1900, ornithologist Thomas G. Gentry authored Intelligence in Plants and Animals which argued that plants have consciousness. Literary scholar Ed Folsom described it as "an exhaustive investigation of how such animals as bees, ants, worms and buzzards, as well as all kinds of plants, display intelligence and thus have souls".

Captain Arthur Smith in the early 1900s authored the first article on "plant consciousness". In his article, Smith blurred the lines between plants and animals by pointing out the "sensibility" of plants, like animals, to outside stimuli as a form of consciousness. Smith argued that the brain, which plants lack, is not necessary for consciousness, since animals like Protozoa and Coelenterata lack it but still are labeled as conscious. Also, Smith defined intelligence as the ability to change behaviors based on different situations, as seen in the Mimosa when it responds to light touch, shadows, and darkness.

In 1905, Rev. Charles Fletcher Argyll Saxby authored a pamphlet, Do Plants Think? Some speculations concerning a neurology and psychology of plants.

Maurice Maeterlinck wrote about the intelligence of flowers in 1907.

Royal Dixon in his 1914 book, The Human Side of Plants argued that plants are sentient and have minds and souls.

=== Jagadish Chandra Bose ===
Jagadish Chandra Bose invented various devices and instruments to measure electrical responses in plants. Bose is considered an important forerunner of plant neurobiology by proponents of plant cognition.

According to biologist Patrick Geddes "In his investigations on response in general Bose had found that even ordinary plants and their different organs were sensitive— exhibiting, under mechanical or other stimuli, an electric response, indicative of excitation." One visitor to his laboratory, the vegetarian playwright George Bernard Shaw, was intensely disturbed upon witnessing a demonstration in which a cabbage had "convulsions" as it boiled to death.

Bose was the author of The Nervous Mechanism of Plants, published in 1926. Karl F. Kellerman, Associate Chief of the Bureau of Plant Industry, United States Department of Agriculture criticized Bose's interpretation of the results from his experiments, stating that he failed to prove the conclusions from his reports that plants feel pain. Kellerman commented that "Sir Jagadar passed an electric current through plants, and his instruments recorded a break in the current. Such variations in resistance to electric current are found even when passing a current through dead matter".

=== Cleve Backster ===
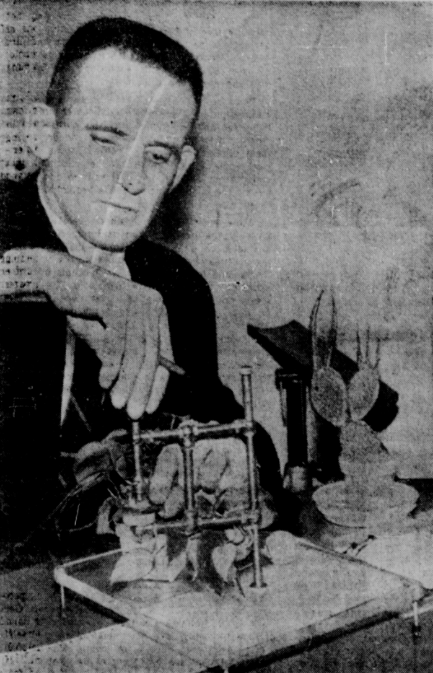
Cleve Backster in 1969

In the 1960s Cleve Backster, an interrogation specialist with the CIA, conducted research that led him to believe that plants can feel and respond to emotions and intents from other organisms including humans. Backster's interest in the subject began in February 1966 when he tried to measure the rate at which water rises from a philodendron's root into its leaves. Because a polygraph or "lie detector" can measure electrical resistance, which would alter when the plant was watered, he attached a polygraph to one of the plant's leaves. Backster stated that, to his immense surprise, "the tracing began to show a pattern typical of the response you get when you subject a human to emotional stimulation of short duration". His ideas about primary perception (plants responding to emotions and intents) became known as the "Backster effect".

In 1975, K. A. Horowitz, D. C. Lewis and E. L. Gasteiger published an article in Science giving their results when repeating one of Backster's effects – plant response to the killing of brine shrimp in boiling water. The researchers grounded the plants to reduce electrical interference and rinsed them to remove dust particles. As a control, three of five pipettes contained brine shrimp while the remaining two only had water; the pipettes were delivered to the boiling water at random. This investigation used a total of 60 brine shrimp deliveries to boiling water while Backster's had used 13. Positive correlations did not occur at a rate great enough to be considered statistically significant. Other controlled experiments that attempted to replicate Backster's findings also produced negative results.

Botanist Arthur Galston and physiologist Clifford L. Slayman who investigated Backster's claims wrote:

There is no objective scientific evidence for the existence of such complex behaviour in plants. The recent spate of popular literature on "plant consciousness" appears to have been triggered by "experiments" with a lie detector, subsequently reported and embellished in a book called The Secret Life of Plants. Unfortunately, when scientists in the discipline of plant physiology attempted to repeat the experiments, using either identical or improved equipment, the results were uniformly negative. Further investigation has shown that the original observations probably arose from defective measuring procedures.

John M. Kmetz noted that the Backster effect was based on observations of only seven plants, which nobody including Backster was able to replicate.

The television show MythBusters also performed experiments (season 4, episode 18, 2006) to test the concept. The tests involved connecting plants to a polygraph galvanometer and employing actual and imagined harm upon the plants or upon others in the plants' vicinity. The galvanometer showed a reaction about one third of the time. The experimenters, who were in the room with the plant, posited that the vibrations of their actions or the room itself could have affected the polygraph. After isolating the plant, the polygraph showed a response slightly less than one third of the time. Later experiments with an EEG failed to detect anything. The show concluded that the results were not repeatable, and that the theory was not true.

Backster's research was cited in the pseudoscientific book The Secret Life of Plants in 1973. Whilst the book captured public attention it severely damaged the credibility of the field of plant intelligence. Philosopher Yogi H. Hendlin noted that the book's "combination of haphazard, panpsychist metaphysical speculations and unmethodical citizen science stigmatised legitimate progressive plant research, alongside the era's new-age pseudoscience, tarring the discipline's serious inquiry".

=== Dorothy Retallack ===
In 1973, Dorothy Retallack authored The Sound of Music and Plants. In the book, Retallack records experiments she conducted at Colorado Women's College on applying different music to plants in controlled chambers. After about 20 experiments, she stated that the plants died in response to acid rock, had no response to country music, and flourished under classical music and jazz. Retallack was ecstatic to find out that she and the plants had overlapping taste in music.

Despite Retallack's pride in her experiments, the experiments were described as pseudoscientific and poorly designed as there was a lack of control for factors such as humidity, light and water. Also, Retallack did not have scientific definitions for genres of music. Professors and researchers from Colorado Women's College expressed anger and embarrassment over the experiments. Nonetheless, Retallack's work had a lasting impact, as attempts to replicate her experiment are still ongoing to this day.

== Modern research ==
Anthony Trewavas is credited with reintroducing the idea of plant intelligence in the early 2000s. In 2003, Trewavas led a study to see how the roots interact with one another and study their signal transduction methods. He was able to draw similarities between water stress signals in plants affecting developmental changes and signal transductions in neural networks causing responses in muscle. Particularly, when plants are under water stress, there are abscisic acid dependent and independent effects on development. This brings to light further possibilities of plant decision-making based on its environmental stresses. The integration of multiple chemical interactions show evidence of the complexity in these root systems.

In 2014, Anthony Trewavas released a book called Plant Behavior and Intelligence that highlighted a plant's cognition through its colonial-organization skills reflecting insect swarm behaviors. This organizational skill reflects the plant's ability to interact with its surroundings to improve its survivability, and a plant's ability to identify exterior factors. Evidence of the plant's minimal cognition of spatial awareness can be seen in their root allocation relative to neighboring plants. The organization of these roots have been found to originate from the root tip of plants.

In 2012, Paco Calvo Garzón and Fred Keijzer speculated that plants exhibited structures equivalent to (1) action potentials (2) neurotransmitters and (3) synapses. Also, they stated that a large part of plant activity takes place underground, and that the notion of a 'root brain' was first mooted by Charles Darwin in 1880. Free movement was not necessarily a criterion of cognition, they held. The authors gave five conditions of minimal cognition in living beings, and concluded that 'plants are cognitive in a minimal, embodied sense that also applies to many animals and even bacteria.' In 2017 biologists from University of Birmingham announced that they found a "decision-making center" in the root tip of dormant Arabidopsis seeds.

In 2016, Peter A. Crisp and his colleagues proposed a novel view on plant memory in their review: plant memory could be advantageous under recurring and predictable stress; however, resetting or forgetting about the brief period of stress may be more beneficial for plants to grow as soon as the desirable condition returns.

Plant memory has been described as an environmental-dependent adaptive mechanism that utilizes past environmental stimuli to optimize future growth through better resource distribution. Memories are encoded through the formation of molecules and metabolites, as well as through DNA methylation and histone modifications. Memories can be within a generation, such as the regulation of flowering by vernalization in A. thaliana, which involves the turning off of the flowering inhibitor gene, AtFLC, during cold temperatures and remains turned off even after temperatures increase again. Conversely, memories can be passed across generations to influence the development of offspring.

Peter Wohlleben argued for plant sentience in his 2016 book The Hidden Life of Trees. The book was widely criticized by biologists and forest scientists for using strong anthropomorphic and teleological language such as describing trees as having friendships and registering fear, love and pain. It has been described as containing a "conglomeration of half-truths, biased judgements, and wishful thinking".

In 2017 Yokawa, K. et al. found that, when exposed to anesthetics, a number of plants lost both their autonomous and touch-induced movements. Venus flytraps no longer generate electrical signals and their traps remain open when trigger hairs were touched, and growing pea tendrils stopped their autonomous movements and were immobilized in a curled shape.

Affifi (2018) proposed an empirical approach to examining the ways plants model coordinate goal-based behaviour to environmental contingency as a way of understanding plant learning. According to Affifi, associative learning will only demonstrate intelligence if it is seen as part of teleologically integrated activity. Otherwise, it can be reduced to mechanistic explanation.

Raja et al. (2020) found that potted French bean plants, when planted 30 centimetres from a garden cane, would adjust their growth patterns to enable themselves to use the cane as a support in the future. Raja later stated that "If the movement of plants is controlled and affected by objects in their vicinity, then we are talking about more complex behaviours (rather than simple) reactions". Raja proposed that researchers should look for corresponding cognitive signatures.

=== Plant consciousness ===
A minority of researchers within the field of plant neurobiology argue that plants are conscious organisms. Although arguments in favor of plant intelligence tend to draw similarities between plant phenomena and animal neurobiology, it is unsure if these traits are significantly comparable to their neural counterparts. Structures like phloem, although similar to neurons, cannot be considered as convergent structures, and terms such as plant "neural networks" are similarly regarded to how we interpret the word "learning" in the context of AI, that is, they are closer to metaphors.

František Baluška (2021) argues for a model called the Cellular Basis of Consciousness (CBC) which proposes that all cells are conscious. The model has been criticized for being based on only speculation and lacking empirical evidence for its claim that cells have consciousness.

=== Definition of intelligence ===
One of the biggest debates in regard to plant intelligence is how intelligence is defined, as a lack of consensus in its meaning can lead to varying interpretations.

In Anthony Trewavas's "Plant Intelligence: An Overview" (2016), Trewavas collects multiple definitions of intelligence from various sources:

- Geneticist Herbert Spencer Jennings (1906) describes intelligence as the action of "profiting from experience" or the ability to learn from experiences and use that knowledge in the future.
- Psychologists Robert J. Sternberg and Douglas K. Detterman (1986) say "Intelligence is a capacity for problem-solving."
- Shane Legg and Marcus Hutter (2007) found 70 different definitions of intelligence and compiled them into a single summary that goes as follows:
  - Intelligence is a property an individual has when it interacts with the world around them.
  - Intelligence is the individual's ability to succeed or profit when pursuing a goal.
  - Intelligence is the capability of the individual to adapt to various goals and environments.

In Daniel A. Chamovitz's article (2018), "Plants are intelligent; now what?", Chamovitz argues that the definition of intelligence has become overly vague which "leaves room for multiple encompassing definitions." Although he acknowledges various traits in plants showing signs of intelligence, such as similar physiology to animal neural networks, he doesn't believe plant intelligence should be considered a field of scientific study due to its lack of an objective definition: "As scientists, we must only deal with that which is testable and falsifiable, and intelligence, with a subjective definition, is neither."

=== Organizations ===
Modern research on plant intelligence is conducted by researchers associated with the Society for Plant Neurobiology that was established in 2005. Due to criticisms from botanists and complaints from early members that affiliations with the Society were negatively impacting their careers, the Society was renamed the Society of Plant Signaling and Behavior (SPSB) in 2009. Research on plant intelligence is also conducted by the International Laboratory of Plant Neurobiology headed by Stefano Mancuso. It has been described as "the world's only laboratory dedicated to plant intelligence".

== Criticism ==
The idea of plant cognition or plant intelligence is a source of controversy and is not generally accepted among plant scientists. Plant neurobiology has been criticized for misleading the public with false terminology. This is because there is no definite scientific evidence that plants possess cognitive abilities or are sentient.

Parallel to the argument that plants do not have cognitive abilities or consciousness, Amadeo Alpi and thirty-five other scientists published an article in 2007 titled "Plant Neurobiology: No Brain, No Gain?" in Trends in Plant Science. Alpi et al. claim that since there is no evidence for the presence of neurons, synapses, or brains in plants, the idea of plant neurobiology and cognition is unfounded and needs to be redefined. Plants are able to respond to external stimuli, such as light, however, there is no evidence of intentional cognition. They commented that "plant neurobiology does not add to our understanding of plant physiology, plant cell biology or signaling".

- In response to Amadeo Alpi's article, Francisco Calvo Garzón published an article in Plant Signaling and Behavior. He states that, while plants do not have neurons as animals do, they do possess an information-processing system composed of cells. He argues that this system can be used as a basis for discussing the cognitive abilities of plants.
- However, other biologists reproved Calvo's argument. They said that consciousness is something that requires having a mental image of the world or a representation of the sensed world, but plants cannot experience such thing.

Additionally, a report by Lincoln Taiz et al. suggests that it is very unlikely that plants possess consciousness because they do not have any anatomical structures that are even slightly similar to how complex the animal brain is. Animals with sufficiently complex nervous systems are considered likely to be conscious. However, plants have a comparatively simple anatomical organization and do not possess neurons and brains. Therefore, it is implausible to suggest that plants have consciousness.

== See also ==
- Phytosemiotics
- Plant communication
- Plant perception (physiology)
