= Thomas G. Gentry =

American ornithologist and writer

Thomas George Gentry
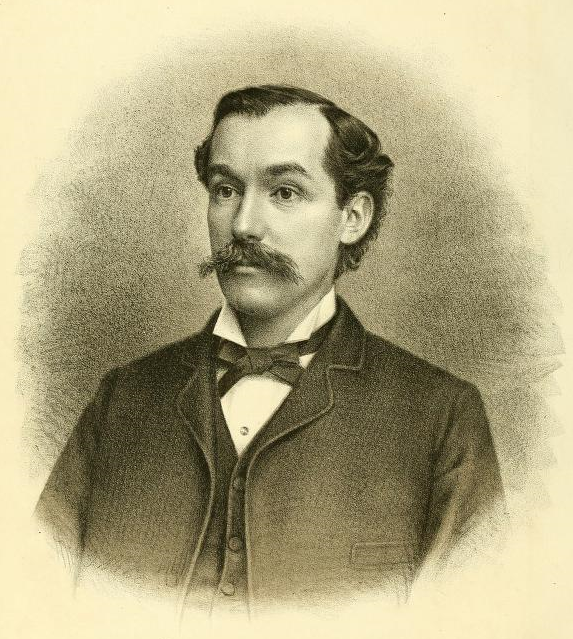
- Born: February 28, 1843; Holmesburg, Philadelphia, Pennsylvania, U.S.
- Died: 1905 (aged 61–62)
- Occupations: Ornithologist, writer

Thomas George Gentry (February 28, 1843 – 1905) was an American educator, ornithologist, naturalist and animal rights writer. Gentry authored an early work on plant intelligence.

== Biography ==
Gentry was born in Holmesburg area of Philadelphia. In 1861, he entered the profession of teaching in Philadelphia. He was elected principal of Southwest Boys' Grammar School in 1884. He married Mary Shoemaker on December 27, 1864. He received the Sc.D. from Chicago College of Science in 1888.

Gentry resided in Germantown area of Philadelphia. Gentry was an elected member of the Academy of Natural Sciences of Philadelphia, Canadian Entomological Society and the Nuttall Ornithological Club. He authored scientific articles in the Proceedings of the Academy of Natural Sciences and The Auk. Gentry expressed interest in Walt Whitman's poetry and exchanged letters with him.

== Works ==
=== Life-Histories of the Birds of Eastern Pennsylvania ===
Gentry authored the two-volume Life-Histories of the Birds of Eastern Pennsylvania. The work was based on his personal observations of birds in the Lehigh Valley region of eastern Pennsylvania. Gentry described the habits and songs of different bird species, characteristics of their nests, periods of incubation and food. A review in the Quarterly Bulletin of the Nuttall Ornithological Club praised the careful studies of Gentry but commented that "the chief defect of the book is its unprepossessing typographical appearance, printer's blunders of every description abounding, while the paper and type are wholly unworthy of so valuable a work."

It was positively reviewed in the Canadian Entomologist who "heartily commend[ed] it to all our readers who are in any way interested in ornithology." The Field and Forest journal liked the first volume and described Gentry as a "true lover of nature, as well as a minute observer." A supportive review of the second volume in The American Journal of Science and Arts suggested that "the author has evidently spent a great amount of time and labor in making and recording observations of this kind". The second volume was also positively reviewed in the Bulletin of the Nuttall Ornithological Club which concluded that "Mr. Gentry is evidently a friend and admirer of the feathered tribes, and often describes their habits most minutely, especially in relation to their nidification. Despite some faults of execution, the work before us contributes much of value respecting the habits of our birds, and records many interesting points in their history not given by previous writers."

In 1912, many years after Gentry's volumes were published, a hostile review in The Auk accused Gentry of fabricating his records of bird food. Gentry stated in his preface to his first volume that he had examined the stomachs of 700 birds to identify their food habits. The reviewer took issue with this and noted that Gentry had listed from 20–50 animal or vegetable items of food for many different bird species but such a great variety of items is suspect and that an obtrusive feature of Gentry's data is the recurrence of the same insect names over and over again. The reviewer concluded that the book is a "dangerous mixture of fact and unfact" and Gentry's records of bird food are "almost entirely products of the author's imagination."

=== Nests and Eggs of Birds of the United States ===
Gentry authored Nests and Eggs of Birds of the United States, in 1882. The book deals exclusively with American oology. It was positively reviewed in The American Naturalist who concluded "we take this opportunity to recommend this elegant work for every library." Conversely, Clinton Hart Merriam negatively reviewed it as a "popular picture book, well adapted for the amusement of children".

The book featured beautiful artwork such as 50 paintings of North American birds, eggs and nests by Edwin Sheppard. It is now a collector's item and worth over $1,350.

=== Intelligence in Plants and Animals ===
Gentry authored Life and Immortality: Or, Souls in Plants and Animals, in 1897 which argued for animal and plant consciousness. Several years later it was republished as Intelligence in Plants and Animals by Doubleday. Gentry believed that all animals and plants have a soul and will survive death. Historian Ed Folsom described it as "an exhaustive investigation of how such animals as bees, ants, worms and buzzards, as well as all kinds of plants, display intelligence and thus have souls". The book argued that even the "lower animals" will have "a future life, where they will receive a just compensation for the sufferings which so many of them undergo in this world." Gentry believed that the doctrine of immortality for animals would lead to a more humane treatment.

A review in The Nation suggested the book was marred by evidences of too much credulity but "the propositions are supported by many facts, a large amount of assumption, a lot of reasoning, and an abundance of revelation, which together necessitate the exercise of a great deal of faith." The book was positively reviewed in The Journal of Practical Metaphysics as a "particular value to all who are interested in the signs of intelligence in the animal and vegetable kingdoms."

== Selected publications ==
- On Habits of Some American Species of Birds (1874)
- Life-Histories of the Birds of Eastern Pennsylvania (1876)
- The House Sparrow at Home and Abroad (1878)
- Nests and Eggs of Birds of the United States (1882)
- Family Names from the Irish, Anglo-Saxon, Anglo-Norman and Scotch Considered in Relation to Their Etymology (1892)
- Pigeon River and Other Poems (1892)
- Life and Immortality: Or, Souls in Plants and Animals (1897)
- Intelligence in Plants and Animals (1900)
