= Plant memory =

Ability of a plant to retain information

In plant biology, plant memory describes the ability of a plant to retain information from experienced stimuli and respond at a later time. For example, some plants have been observed to raise their leaves synchronously with the rising of the sun. Other plants produce new leaves in the spring after overwintering. Many experiments have been conducted into a plant's capacity for memory, including sensory, short-term, and long-term. The most basic learning and memory functions in animals have been observed in some plant species, and it has been proposed that the development of these basic memory mechanisms may have developed in an early organismal ancestor.

Some plant species appear to have developed conserved ways to use functioning memory, and some species may have developed unique ways to use memory function depending on their environment and life history.

The use of the term plant memory still sparks controversy. Some researchers believe the function of memory only applies to organisms with a brain and others believe that comparing plant functions resembling memory to humans and other higher division organisms may be too direct of a comparison. Others argue that the function of the two are essentially the same and this comparison can serve as the basis for further understanding into how memory in plants works.

== History ==
Experiments involving the curling of pea tendrils were some of the first to explore the concept of plant memory. Mark Jaffe recognized that pea plants coil around objects that act as support to help them grow. Jaffe's experiments included testing different stimuli to induce coiling behavior. One such stimulus was the effect of light on the coiling mechanism. When Jaffe rubbed the tendrils in light, he witnessed the expected coiling response. When subjected to perturbation in darkness, the pea plants did not exhibit coiling behavior. Tendrils from the dark experiment were brought back into light hours later, exhibiting a coiling response without any further stimulus. The pea tendrils retained the stimulus that Jaffe had provided and responded to it at a later time. Proceeding these findings, the idea of plant memory sparked interest in the scientific community.

The Venus flytrap may suggest one possible mechanism for memory. Venus flytraps have many tiny hairs along the trap's surface that when touched, trigger the trap to close. But the process requires more than one hair to be touched. In the late 1980s, Dieter Hodick and Andrias Sievers proposed a model for memory retention in Venus flytraps involving calcium concentrations.

Comparing the phenomenon to human action potentials, they hypothesized that the first touch of a hair leads to an increase of calcium in the cell, allowing for a temporary retention of the stimulus. If a second stimulus does not occur shortly after the initial increase of calcium, then the calcium level will not surpass a certain threshold required to trigger the trap to shut, which they likened to a memory being lost. If a second stimulus occurs quickly enough, then the calcium levels can overcome the threshold and trigger the trap to close. This demonstrated a delayed response to an initial stimulus, which could be likened to short-term memory.

While further experiments supported short term retention of signals in some plant species, questions remained about long term retention.

In 2014, Monica Gagliano conducted experiments into long-term plant memory using Mimosa pudica, a plant unique for its ability to curl its leaves in defense against touching or shaking. In Gagliano's experiment, the plants were repeatedly dropped from a prescribed height, shaking the branches and eliciting a defense response. Over time, Gagliano observed a decrease in leaf curling in response to being dropped. But when shaken by hand, the plants still curled their leaves. This appeared to show that the plants were still capable of the defense response, but that they remembered that the dropping stimulus didn't pose a threat of herbivory.

Gagliano then tested to see how long the plant could retain the information for. She waited a month and then repeated the dropping experiment with the same individuals from the previous experiment. She observed that the plants had seemingly retained the memory of not needing a defense response when dropped. Gagliano's work suggested that some plant species may be capable of learning and retaining information over extended periods of time.

In 2016, Gagliano expanded on her work in plant memory with an experiment involving the common garden pea, Pisum sativum, which actively grows towards light sources. Gagliano established a Y-maze task with a light and a fan and placed each pea plant into the task. Gagliano observed that when young pea plants were grown in a Y-maze task where the light source came from the same direction as a fan, that when the pea plants were placed into a Y-maze task with only a fan, the pea plants grew in the direction of the fan. It appeared that the pea plants had learned to associate the fan with light. This seemingly contradicted the natural behavior of the pea plant to determine its directionality of growth based on light. Gagliano did note that this learned behavior was only successful when tested during the daytime. She suggested that the mechanism of learning may be regulated by metabolic demands and that associative learning may represent a derived trait of animals and plants from a common ancestor.

In 2020, Kasey Markel, a PhD student in plant biology at UC Davis attempted to recreate Gagliano's experiment. Using a larger sample size and a fully blind analysis, he was unable to yield the same results. Markel cited the differing provider of the Pisum sativum seeds and brand of fan as possible variables that affected the outcome of her experiment. Markel did suggest that further verification of Gagliano's work was necessary before Gagliano's conclusions could be fully accepted.

In 2026 it was revealed that scientists had developed a method for tracking the movements of molecules within plant roots, that reveals how plants store a memory of winter inside their cells.

== Physiology ==
The physiology of plant memory is documented in many studies and is understood to have four main physiological mechanisms that work together in synchrony to provide the plant with basic memory functions, and are thought to be precursors to advanced memory functions found in animals. These four mechanisms are the storing and recalling, habituation, gene priming or epigenetics, and the biological clock.

=== Plant Memory due to Environmental Stimuli ===
The ability to respond to environmental stimuli is a skill that many plants possess. Exposure to mild stress is a good primer to plant memory. This memory that becomes developed from recurrent exposure better prepares a plant for future stressful factors. Plants also have a capacity for the amount of memory that they are able to possess and when they no longer are exposed to a certain factor they may "forget" what they learned to make room for new memories. Such stresses that plants remember and prime themselves for are drought, excessive light, oxidative stress, abscisic acid, and cold and warm climates.

Memories are formed in plants through metabolites or through transcription factors in the plant. Changes in gene expression due to methylation and/or paused RNA pol II may also play this role in memory formation. A similar phenomena as found in animal species. Though the mechanism of memory formation in plants is relatively unknown, it is hypothesized that a complex calcium signaling network is responsible for the formation and storage of a plant's memories and past experiences. Free calcium responds to internal and external stimuli creating an electrochemical gradient through channels and pumps in the plant. This response is thought to be stored and ingrained within the plant for future recall to similarly stressful situations.

=== Storage and recall ===
The storage and recall method of memory occurs when a plant, in response to a stimuli, reduces or increases the concentration of a chemical in certain tissues, and maintains this concentration for a certain period of time. The plant then uses this concentration of chemical as a signal for a recall response. Stimuli known to create a store and recall responses like this are touch, damage, temperature, drought, and even electromagnetic radiation. It is suspected that Ca2+ signalling plays a key role in this form of plant memory. A proposed mechanism of this is that the presence or absence of Ca^{2+} acts as a long term on/off switch for cellular processes in response to stimuli for storing genes. Ca2+ along with electrical signalling, is also integral as a signalling pathway for plants to transmit signals of the original stimulus between cells or tissues throughout the plant. An example of short term electrical memory store and recall function can be seen in the trap mechanism of the Venus flytrap. When one hair on the trap is touched, an electrical is generated and retained for 20 seconds. The trap requires that at least one more hair is brushed within this 20 second period in order to reach the charge threshold required to close the trap. Electrical signaling from cell to cell in plants is controlled by proteins in the cell membrane. Protein memristors are biological resistor proteins that can depend on the electrical history of the cell, and are a class of protein that are shared between plants and animals in electrical memory function. There is also a neuroreceptor found in plants called glutamate, glutamate functions as a neurocommunicator of memory and learning in humans. In plants, glutamate functions as a signaling molecule that responds to multiple stressors such as salinity, temperature, drought conditions, pathogens, and wound stress. Experiments conducted showed expression and activation of glutamate receptors when subjected to stress.

Trauma Reaction Example:

Long-term trauma memory in plants has been an area of interest for several years because of its potential to understand other types of memory. In the mid-twentieth century, Rudolf Dostal and Michel Tellier conducted a set of experiments which revealed interesting results. Under normal conditions, the decapitation of the apical bud of a plant leads to symmetric growth of the lateral buds. However, Dostal and Thellier found that removing the cotyledon on one side of the plant, or simply wounding it, resulted in asymmetrical growth towards the healthier side of the plant. This trauma memory hypothesis was solidified when Thellier showed that past damage can be remembered by the plant even after removing both cotyledons, suggesting that trauma memory is stored in the bud. Dostal and Thellier were pioneers in understanding trauma memory in plants but the physiological and molecular processes involved are still unknown. In this article, we propose several potential mechanisms that could explain how information about past trauma is stored in the bud.

One proposed mechanism for plant memory storage in the bud is the relative rise in Ca2+ concentration within the cytosol of plant cells via calcium waves. The cytoplasm of plant cells has a relatively low concentration of Ca2+, but the cell has stores of Ca2+ throughout. These stores of Ca2+ are usually membrane bound organelles that have inositol-3-phosphate (IP3) dependent Ca2+ channels within their membranes. These channels only open when they are bound to IP3, a molecule that is produced through intracellular processes governed by the enzyme phospholipase C. Some of the Ca2+ channels are not IP3 dependent and open in response to other stimuli like electrical gradients or the stretching of a membrane. Once a Ca2+ channel (IP3 gated or not) opens, it can briefly stimulate the opening of adjacent channels. This allows for a wave of calcium to be released from these Ca2+ stores into the cytoplasm of the plant cell. Calcium will flow down its concentration gradient, from an area of high Ca2+ concentration to an area of low Ca2+ concentration, through the now open Ca2+ channels. Because (1) there are many forms of Ca2+ channels on these storage organelles (2) these channels respond to different stimuli and (3) depend on the relative concentration gradients of these stimuli, the kinetics and magnitude of calcium waves are specific to the stimuli that triggered them. The respective elevation in the concentration of Ca2+ in the cytoplasm "stores" the memory of the stimuli. This proposed mechanism is a form of plant memory storage.

Another potential mechanism involves electrical signals and calcium. When Ca2+ floods the cytoplasm it allows the plant to store a memory, the duration and amplitude of this Ca2+ wave is determined by the type of stimulus that was perceived and how the plant will store the memory. Electric signals are induced by variation potentials which are stimulated by an injury such as heat or a cut. There are also action potentials but these are stimulated by non-damaging stimuli such as temperature. The variation potential travels through the xylem and is regulated by both hydraulic pressure and system potentials, such as the Ca2+ flux. Two methods by which a signal may travel over a short distance is by propagating over the cell membrane through the plasmodesmata, or secondly the current of one cell membrane may depolarize a neighboring cell membrane without having to be in direct contact. But for memory purposes the electric signal needs to travel over a longer distance, sieve tubes are used since they have pores and a continuous plasma membrane which makes sieve tubes low resistance. With a trauma the xylem can have a change in hydrostatic pressure which leads to turgor changes in the neighboring parenchyma cells and then via mechano-sensors membrane potential changes. Sheath cells protect the signal when traveling from the mesophyll to the phloem which contains the sieve tubes. Although there are many suggested methods by which long-distance electric signals may travel, the exact ion channels that are used are still unknown, but recently GLR genes have been proposed to mediate wound stimulus through cation channels. Another possible method on storage memory and recall is the hormone auxin and how it reacts to a trauma.

While there are many hormones that dictate major plant processes and eventual changes in physiology, auxin remains the most prevalent hormone. Auxin serves to increase cell length, stimulated by light or gravity in processes known as phototropism and gravitropism, respectively. In terms of plant memory, Auxin may act as the mechanism as to which plants respond to stimuli previously encountered. Auxin moves to different sides of the cell, depending on the particular cell type and process initiated. In phototropism, auxin is transported to the side of the plant shaded. This is accomplished through the PIN transport proteins. PIN proteins act as a conduit for auxin, allowing auxin to flow between cells. As auxin accumulates on the shaded side of the plant, the hormone promotes cell elongation in the cells. Auxin does this by stimulating the expansibility of cell walls. This allows cells to expand and elongate, making the plant bend in one direction. This also occurs in the roots, under a different stimulus. Auxin also plays a role in regulating gene expression. The genes that are regulated are correlated with cell expansion biochemistry and physiology. In What a Plant Knows, David Chamovitz describes an experiment in which they test a plants long-term memory regarding past trauma. While the experiment (stated above) concluded that plants can store trauma memory, the exact mechanism is unknown. Chamovitz, along with the original perpetrators of the experiment Rudolf Dostal and Michel Tellier, postulate that Auxin may play a pivotal role in trauma memory because of the hormone's role in regulation of growth through multiple mechanisms including long term gene expression.

Trauma memory is an example illustrating the physiology of memory storage and recall in plants. While the mechanisms responsible for it have yet to be fully determined, our current understanding of plant physiology allows us to propose three pathways to explore: Ca2+ flux, electrical signaling, and auxin stimulation. Long-term trauma memory is only one of the many distinct types of memory in plants and understanding its physiological and molecular mechanisms could reveal discoveries pertinent to other memory processes such as immune memory or muscle-motor memory.

=== Habituation ===
The process of habituation in plants is very similar to the store and recall function, but lacks the recall action. In this case, information is stored and used to acclimate the plant to the original stimulus. A great example of this is research done on mimosa plants and their leaves' acclimated response to being dropped by Gagliano et al. In this study the plants initially reacted to being dropped by closing their leaves, but after the stimulus had been experienced a number of times the plants no longer responded to being dropped by closing their leaves.

=== Epigenetic memory ===
The third aspect of plant memory is epigenetics, where the plant, in response to a stimulus, undergoes histone and chromatin modification leading to changes in gene expression. These changes lead to a subsequent change in what proteins are made by the plant and establish a way for the plant to respond or be affected by stimuli from past experiences. These experiences can be passed down genetically from parent plant to offspring, giving an even longer-term memory of a stimulus such as a stressor or other environmental stimuli. These changes are different from genetic changes because they can be reversed in response to new stimuli or environmental conditions.

=== Biological clocks ===
Plants use biological clocks to perform certain actions at times they will be most effective. The two most well documented biological clocks in plants are the day and seasonal cycles which are usually established by photoreceptors. Once a plant has established a pattern of light, they can effectively memorize night time, daytime, or longer periods like seasons. A clear example of this can be seen in the ability of plants to over winter, cease leaf growth and then activate leaf growth in the spring when environmental conditions favor growth. Phytochrome, a receptor which is activated by red light and inactivated by far-red light, is one of the ways that plants use to control their flowering cycle.

These cycles, or circadian rhythms are controlled by genes associated with different spatial times that are activated when an environmental cue for that time is present. These genes control what proteins are made at certain times, as well as electrical and chemical signals that are produced to control motor proteins and other proteins. The overall result of these processes are subsequent changes in how the plant functions.

== Summary ==
The combination of these four mechanisms of plant memory are proposed to work together to form different functions of memory in a plant. The overall proposed mechanism of this memory is a signal or environmental cues lead to a signal (chemical concentration, calcium waves, electrical, small RNAs, or phytohormones), and this eventually leads to the activation or deactivation of memory associated genes (store and recall, epigenetics, habituation, or circadian rhythms). The protein products of these genes then go on to produce actions based on the memory of the initial stimuli. Memory's molecular processes are not completely known, and several routes and interactions are thought to be involved, including these four aspects. However, more crucially, the systems outlined must be integrated in order to provide a complete knowledge of the memory process.

== See also ==
- Plant cognition
