= Tony Trewavas =

Professor Tony Trewavas FRS FRSE
- Born: Anthony James Trewavas; 17 June 1939 (age 87); London, England, United Kingdom
- Education: University College London (PhD)
- Awards: Fellow of the Royal Society (1999); FRSE(1993); FRSA
- Scientific career
- Fields: Plant biology; Plant intelligence; Plant physiology
- Workplaces: University of East Anglia; University of Edinburgh; Michigan State University
- Thesis: Specific aspects of phosphate metabolism of plants, with special reference to the action of growth hormones on Avena (1965)
- Doctoral advisor: Eric Crook
- Website: www.research.ed.ac.uk/portal/en/persons/anthony-trewavas(4d904649-e93b-46eb-9065-bd578485dcbc).html

Anthony James Trewavas (born 17 June 1939) is Emeritus Professor in the School of Biological Sciences of the University of Edinburgh best known for his research in the fields of plant physiology and molecular biology. His research investigates plant behaviour. Trewavas is credited with reintroducing the idea of plant intelligence in the early 2000s.

== Education and early life ==
Trewavas was born in 1939 and educated at John Roans Grammar School, Blackheath, London which he left in 1958 with five A levels. He obtained both his undergraduate degree and Ph.D in biochemistry at University College London investigating aspects of phosphate metabolism of plants, with special reference to the action of growth hormones on Avena.

== Career ==
Following his PhD, Trewavas did his postdoctoral research at the newly constituted University of East Anglia. He moved to the University of Edinburgh in 1970 and was Professor of Plant Biochemistry 1990–2004. In 1972 he was invited to be first visiting professor at the prestigious Plant Research laboratory in Michigan State University. At the time this laboratory was regarded as the foremost laboratory dealing with plant research. He also, after invitation, spent periods of time as visiting professor at other universities in the Americas and Europe usually providing up to 20 lectures. He is the author of some 250 scientific papers and three books both as editor and author. He was made Professor Emeritus in the University of Edinburgh in 2004.

== Research ==
Plant behaviour is simply the response of plants to environmental problems or change. His main research contribution as the leader of the Edinburgh Molecular Signalling Group, has been in the role of calcium in signal transduction during plant development. Although Trewavas has done significant research of plant molecular mechanisms and signaling, his true fascination was with whole plant behaviour. In 1972 he picked up a book titled General Systems Theory by Ludwig von Bertalanffy about systems theory, which would have a profound influence on this view of biology. It dictated that biology was constructed from systems or network which were all interconnected and these connections gave rise to novel properties of organisms and populations. At a time when most scientists, including himself, were reductionists, this approach was very controversial. Trewavas's articles with his new perspective were ridiculed, and even led to his promotion being temporarily blocked. His inspiration to pursue plant intelligence came from Barbara McClintock, who he mentions in his 2014 book Plant Behaviour and Intelligence. In the book Trewavas defined intelligence as "quite simply the capacity for problem solving" and using this definition he argued that all organisms including plants act intelligently within their environment.

He is a past or present member of the editorial boards of the publications, Trends in Plant Science, Botanica Acta, Plant Physiology, What's New in Plant Physiology, The Biochemical Journal, Molecular Plant, Plant Signaling and Behavior, Plant, Cell & Environment.

=== Evidence to Parliament ===
Trewavas submitted written evidence to the Science and Technology Select Committee of the UK Parliament in April 2013. He summarized his evidence as follows:

- The difference between projection and prediction
- The necessity of scepticism in climate science and the difficulties in testing climate models
- Whether CO_{2} increase is the driver of climate temperature or is it the reverse?
- I conclude that a lack of certainty should lead to removal of legislation

=== Publications ===
- Trewavas, A. (2002). "Malthus foiled again and again". Nature. 418 (6898): 668–670. Bibcode:2002Natur.418..668T. doi:10.1038/nature01013. PMID 12167872. S2CID 4427154.
- Trewavas, A. J. (2001). "The Population/Biodiversity Paradox. Agricultural Efficiency to Save Wilderness". Plant Physiology. 125 (1): 174–179. doi:10.1104/pp.125.1.174. PMC 1539356. PMID 11154326.
- Trewavas, A. (2001). "Urban myths of organic farming". Nature. 410 (6827): 409–410. Bibcode:2001Natur.410..409T. doi:10.1038/35068639. PMID 11260685. S2CID 4428923.
- Knight, M. R.; Campbell, A. K.; Smith, S. M.; Trewavas, A. J. (1991). "Transgenic plant aequorin reports the effects of touch and cold-shock and elicitors on cytoplasmic calcium". Nature. 352 (6335): 524–526. Bibcode:1991Natur.352..524K. doi:10.1038/352524a0. PMID 1865907. S2CID 4239898.
- Knight, H.; Trewavas, A.; Knight, M. (1996). "Cold Calcium Signaling in Arabidopsis Involves Two Cellular Pools and a Change in Calcium Signature after Acclimation". The Plant Cell Online. 8 (3): 489–503. doi:10.1105/tpc.8.3.489. PMC 161115. PMID 8721751.

== Awards and honours ==
He is an elected Fellow of the Royal Society of Edinburgh (FRSE, 1993), the Royal Society of Arts (FRSA, 1995), the Royal Society (FRS, 1999), the Centre for Future Studies (2001). He is also a member of the Academia Europaea in 2002 and received the "corresponding membership" award from the American Society of Plant Biologists in 1999, a prize given to one non-US biologist per year. He is named by the Institute for Scientific Information as in the most highly cited author group in the field of animal and plant Sciences.
