= Glossary of botanical terms =

This glossary of botanical terms is a list of definitions of terms and concepts relevant to botany and plants in general. Terms of plant morphology are included here as well as at the more specific Glossary of plant morphology and Glossary of leaf morphology. For other related terms, see Glossary of phytopathology, Glossary of lichen terms, and List of Latin and Greek words commonly used in systematic names.

== A ==
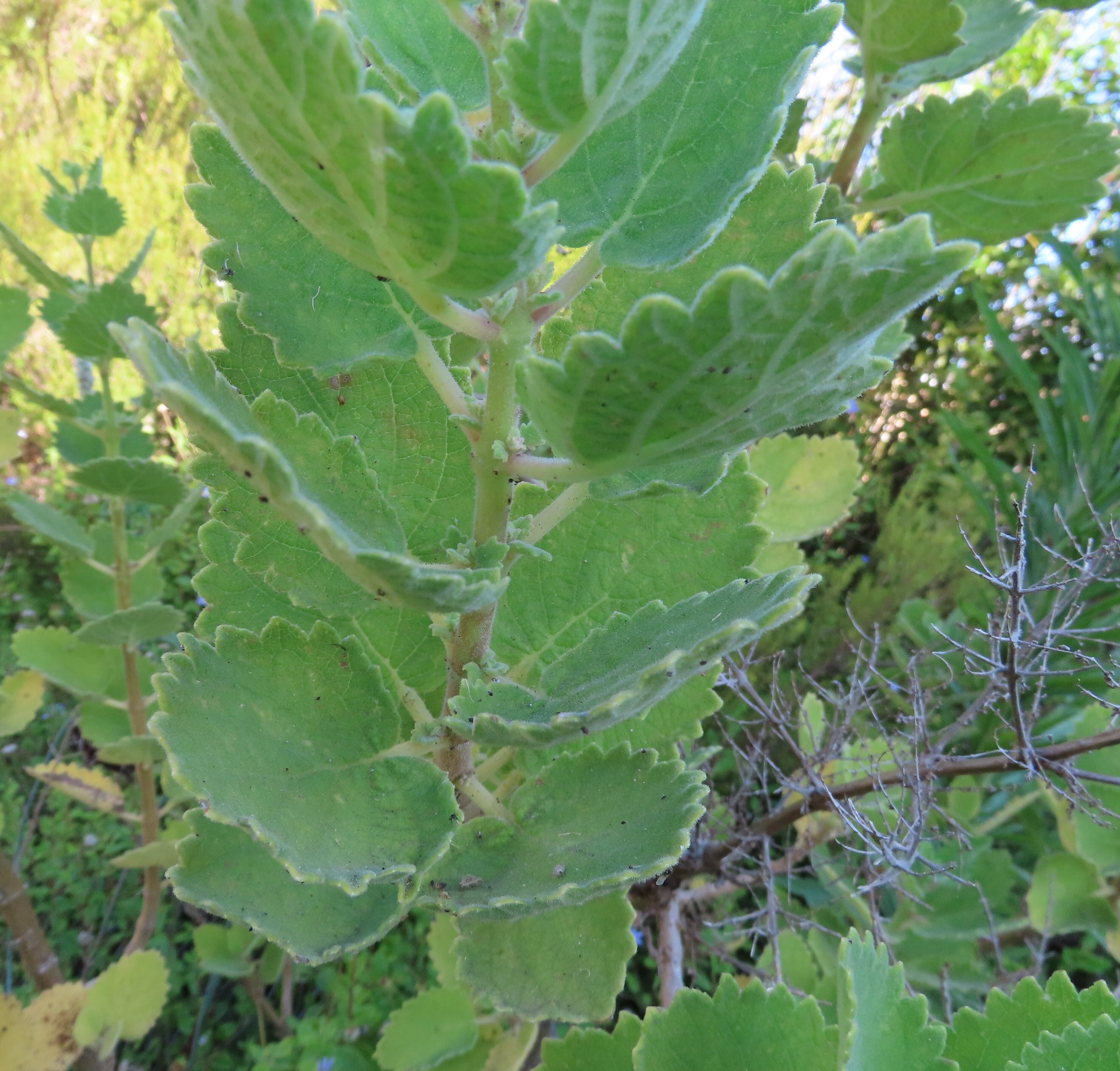
In the bud, Tetradenia riparia leaves have their upper surfaces turned toward the stem and the axil. The lower surface is abaxial ("away from the axis"), and the upper surface is adaxial.

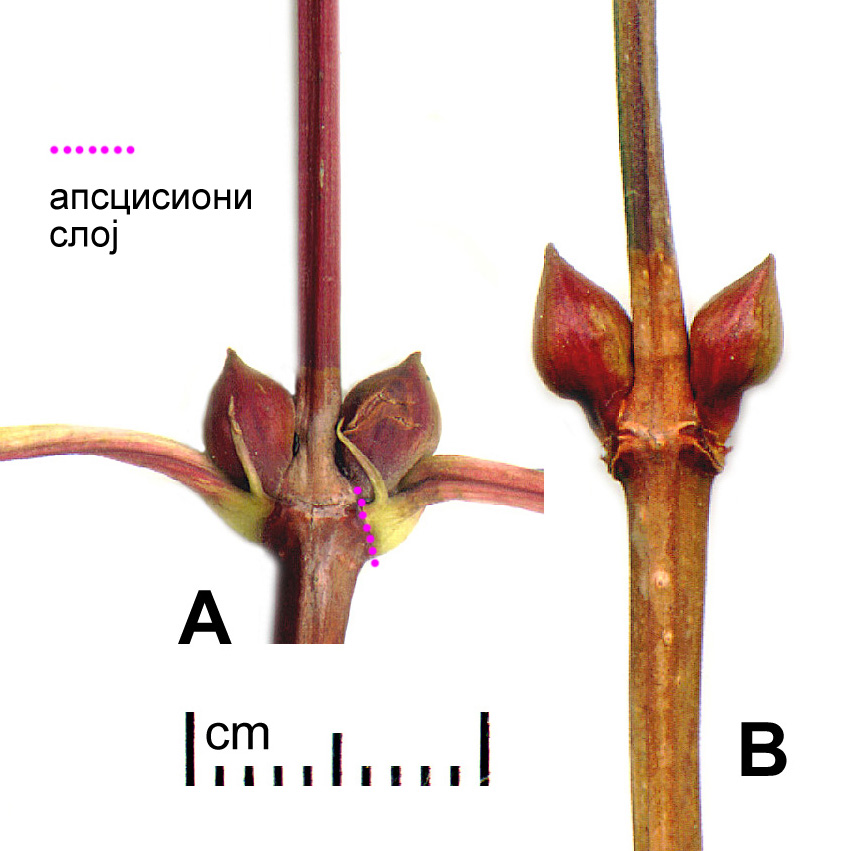
Viburnum abscission

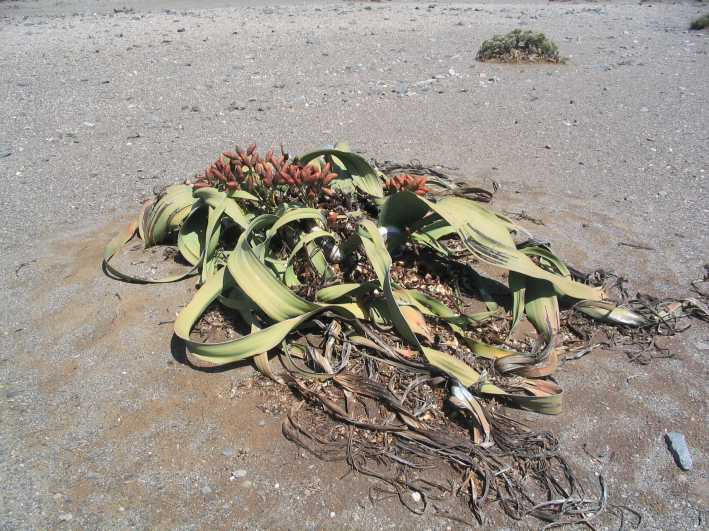
Welwitschia mirabilis presents an example of an acaulescent growth habit unusual in so large a plant species.

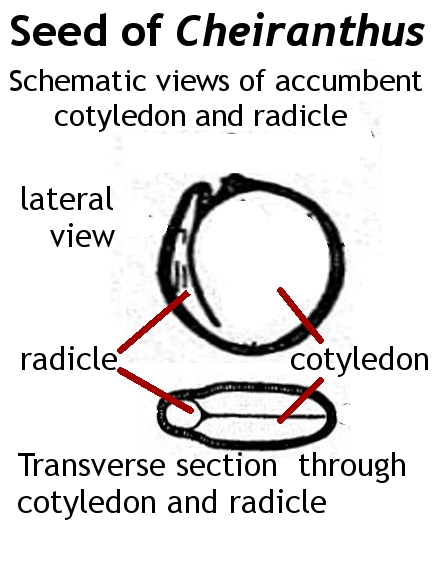
Schematic diagrams of the accumbent arrangement of the cotyledons and radicle in a seed of Erysimum (formerly Cheiranthus)

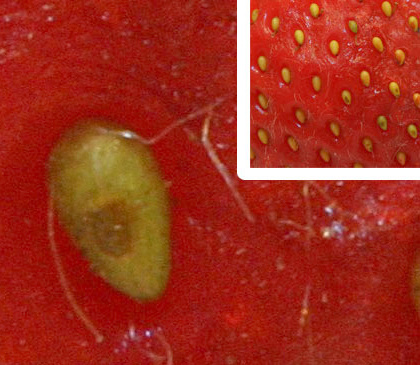
Achenes on the surface of the stem of the infructescence of a strawberry

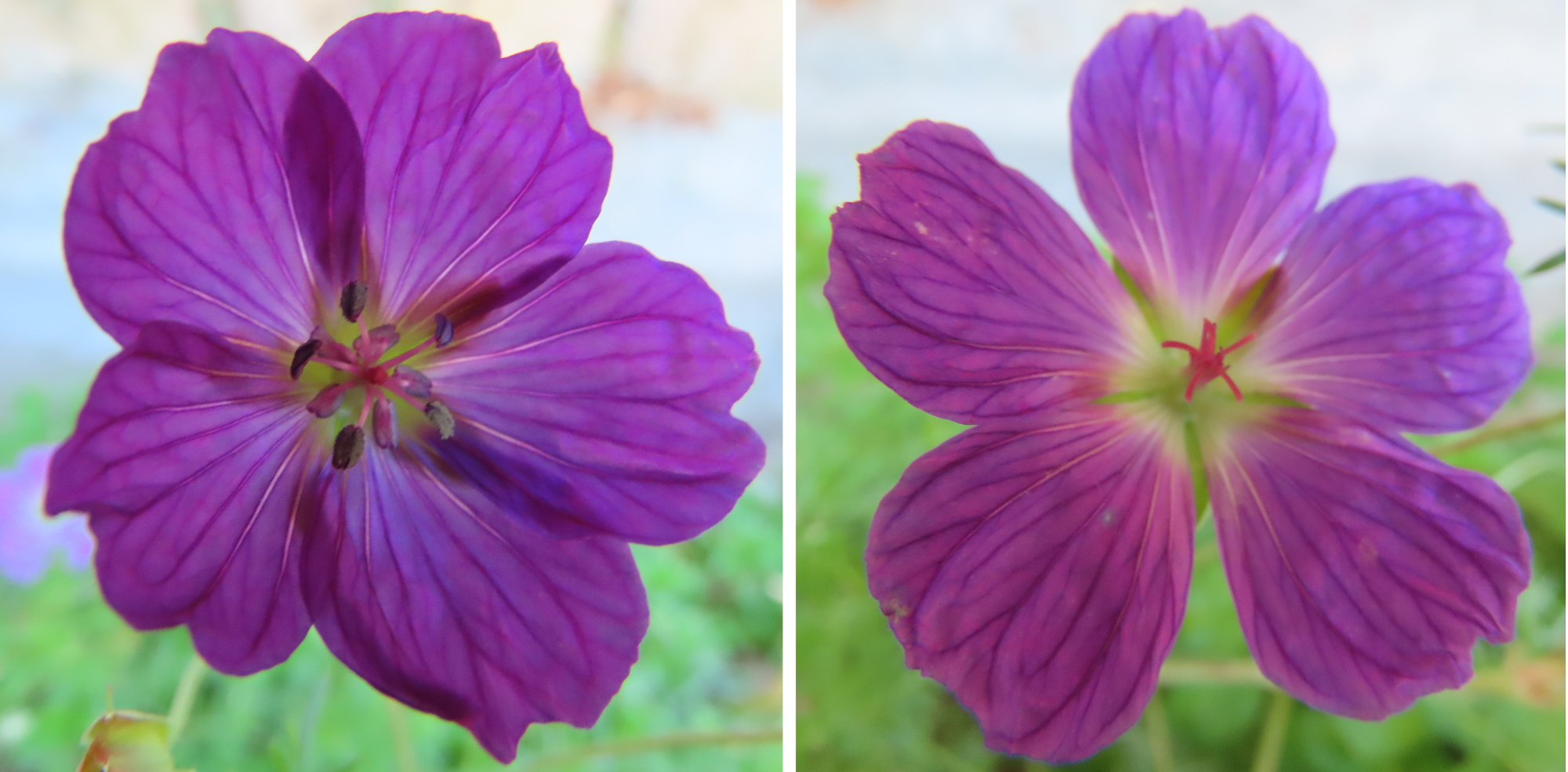
Geranium incanum flowers are actinomorphic, having five axes of symmetry, as opposed to the two axes of symmetry of the zygomorphic flowers of most species of the related genus Pelargonium.

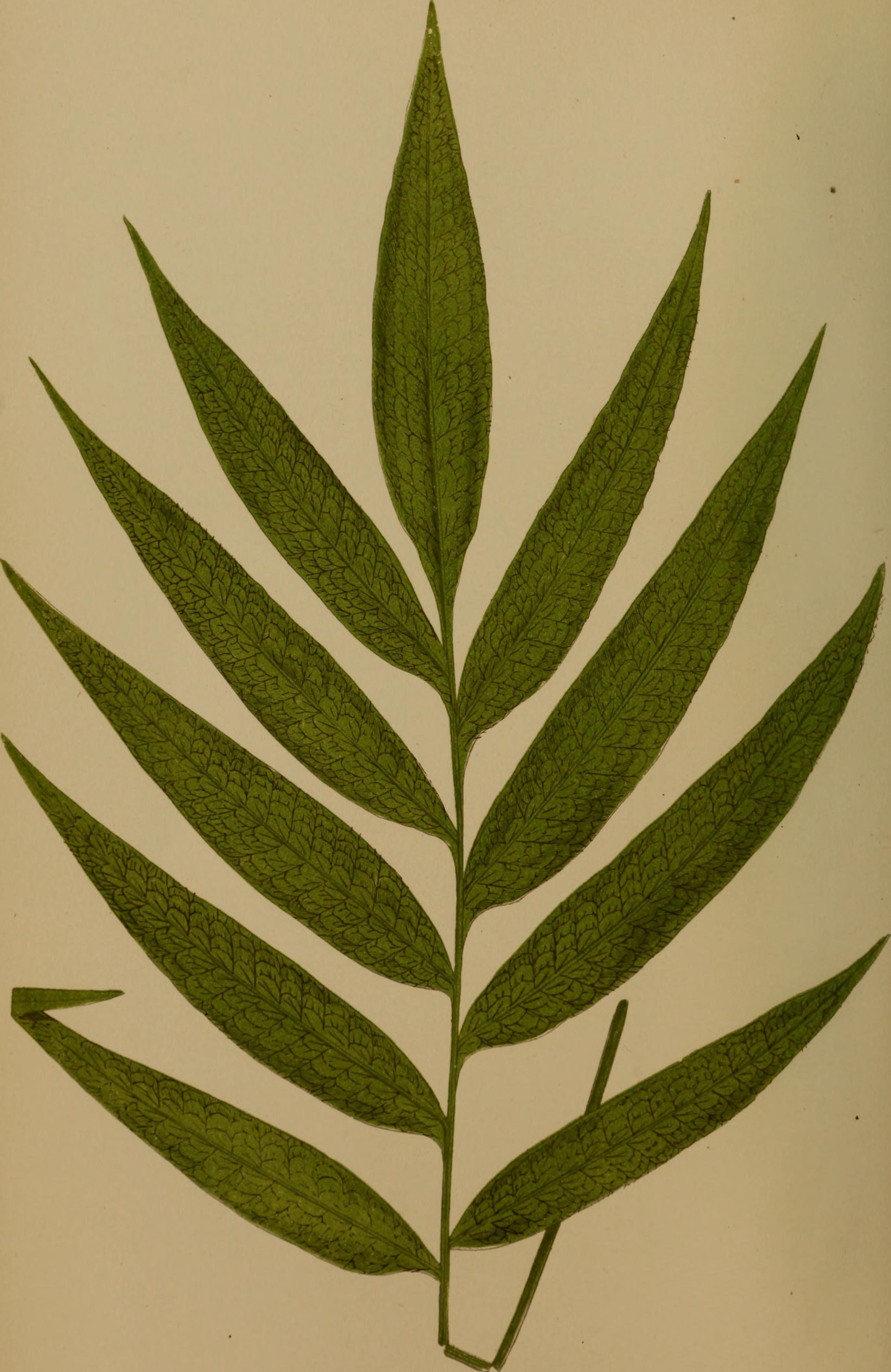
Fern frond with acuminate leaflets

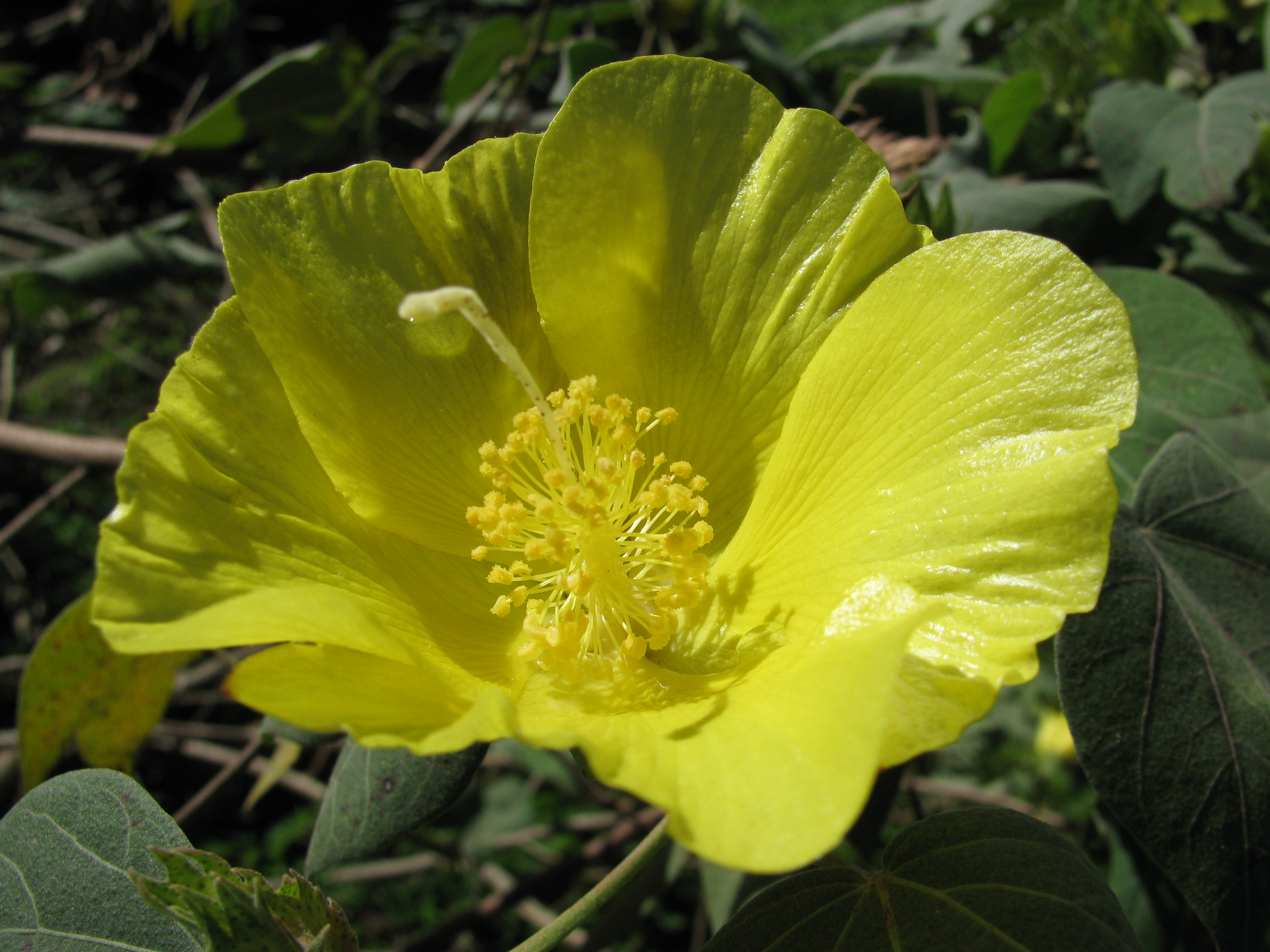
Adelphous stamens in flower of Gossypium tomentosum

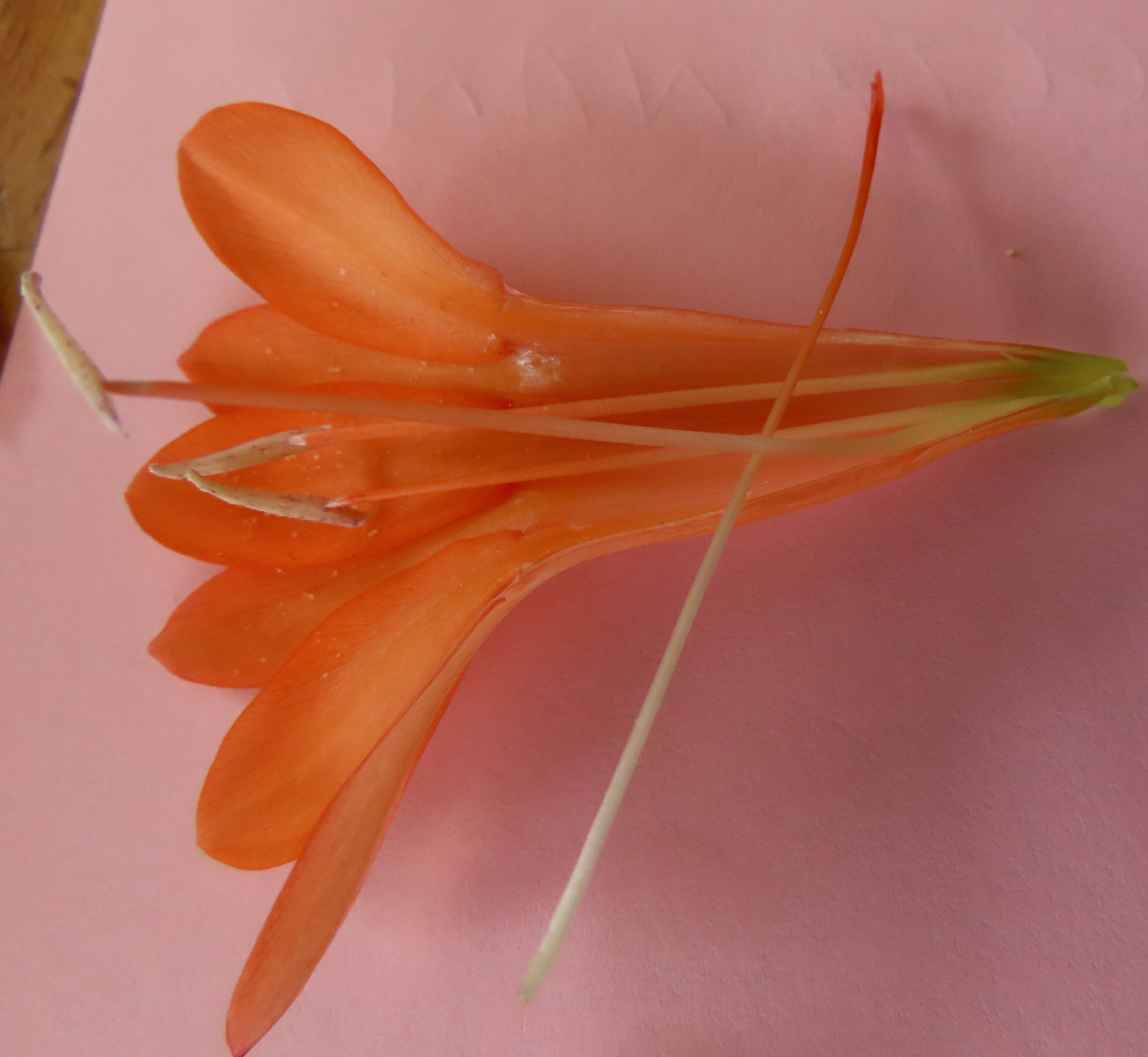
Watsonia flower slit open and with one stamen bent upward to show its adnate attachment to the petal

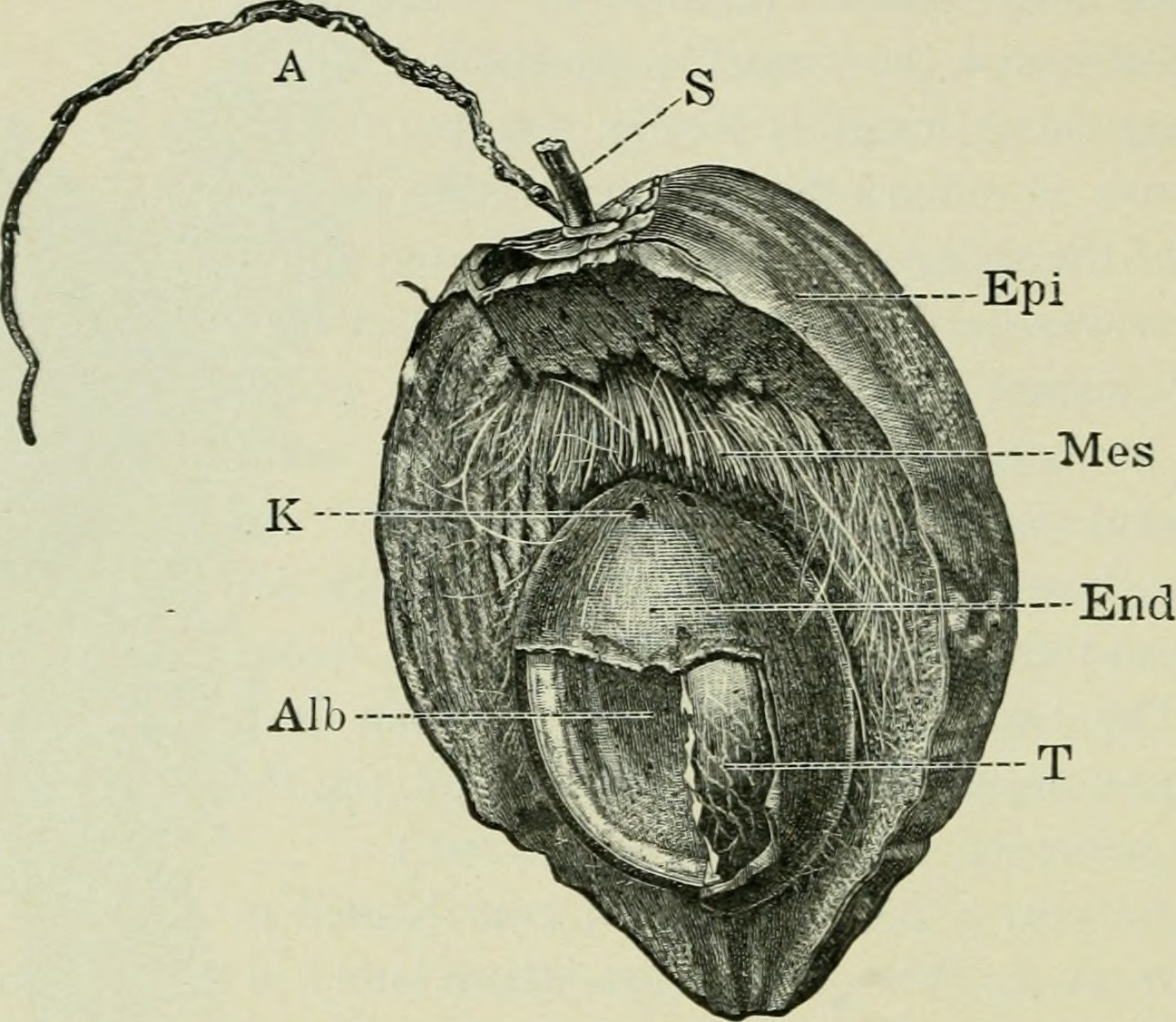
Diagram of a coconut fruit. The albumen (endosperm) is labelled Alb.

Caffeine is an alkaloid with four nitrogen atoms in its carbon skeleton.

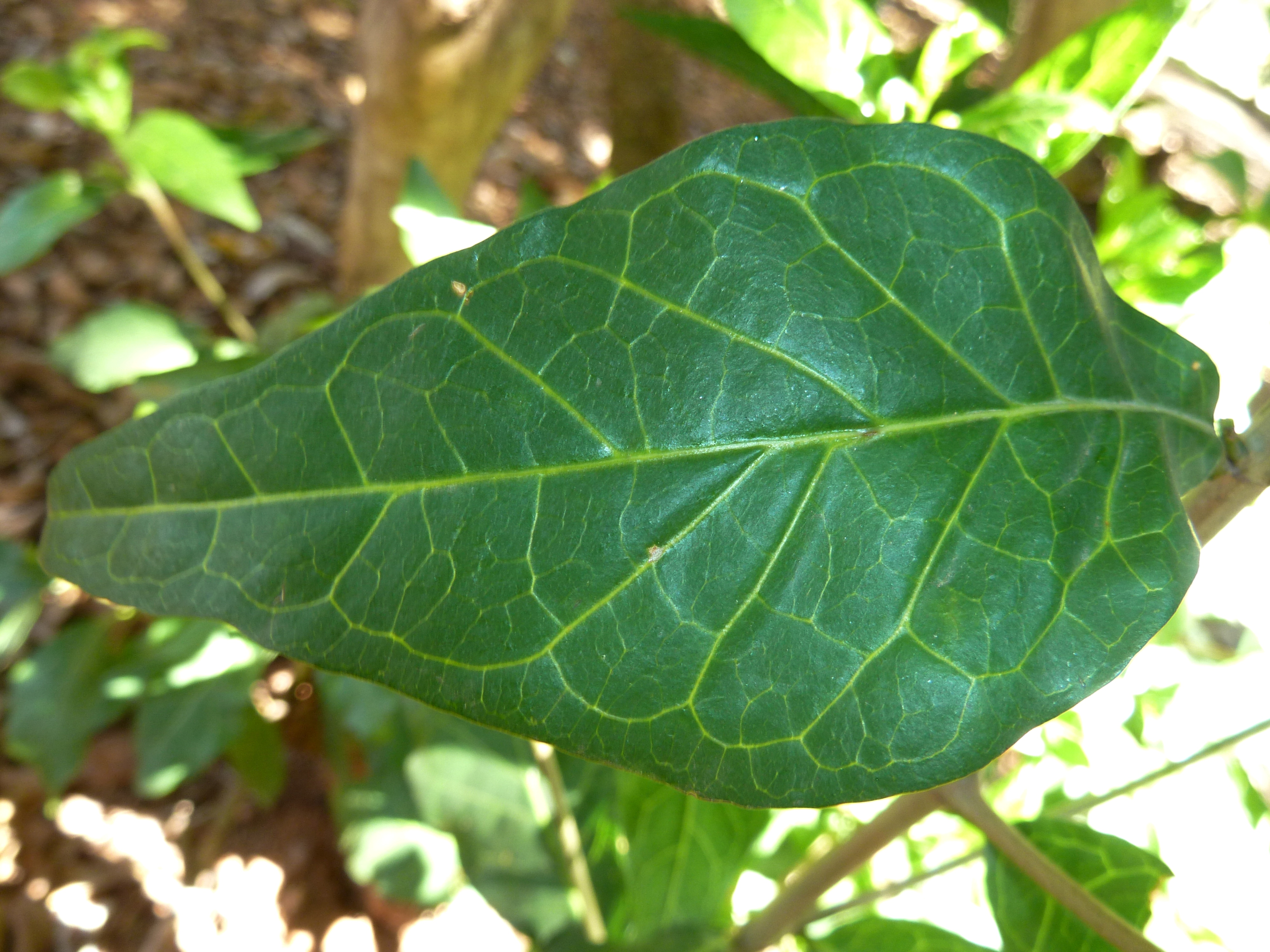
Rothmannia leaf with extensively anastomose venation

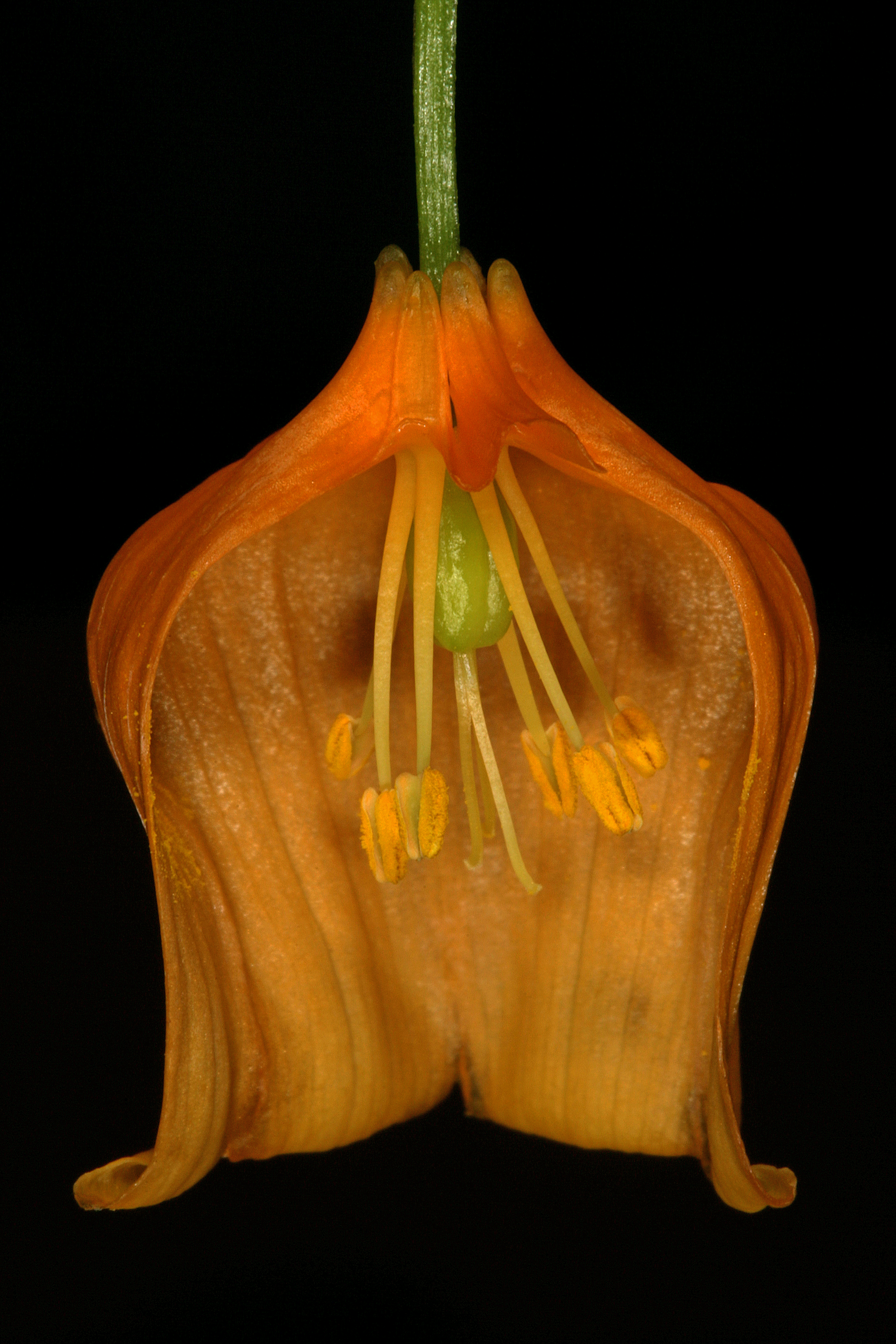
Androgynous flower of Sandersonia aurantiaca cut open longitudinally to show the androecium, which comprises the anthers surrounding the green central pistil

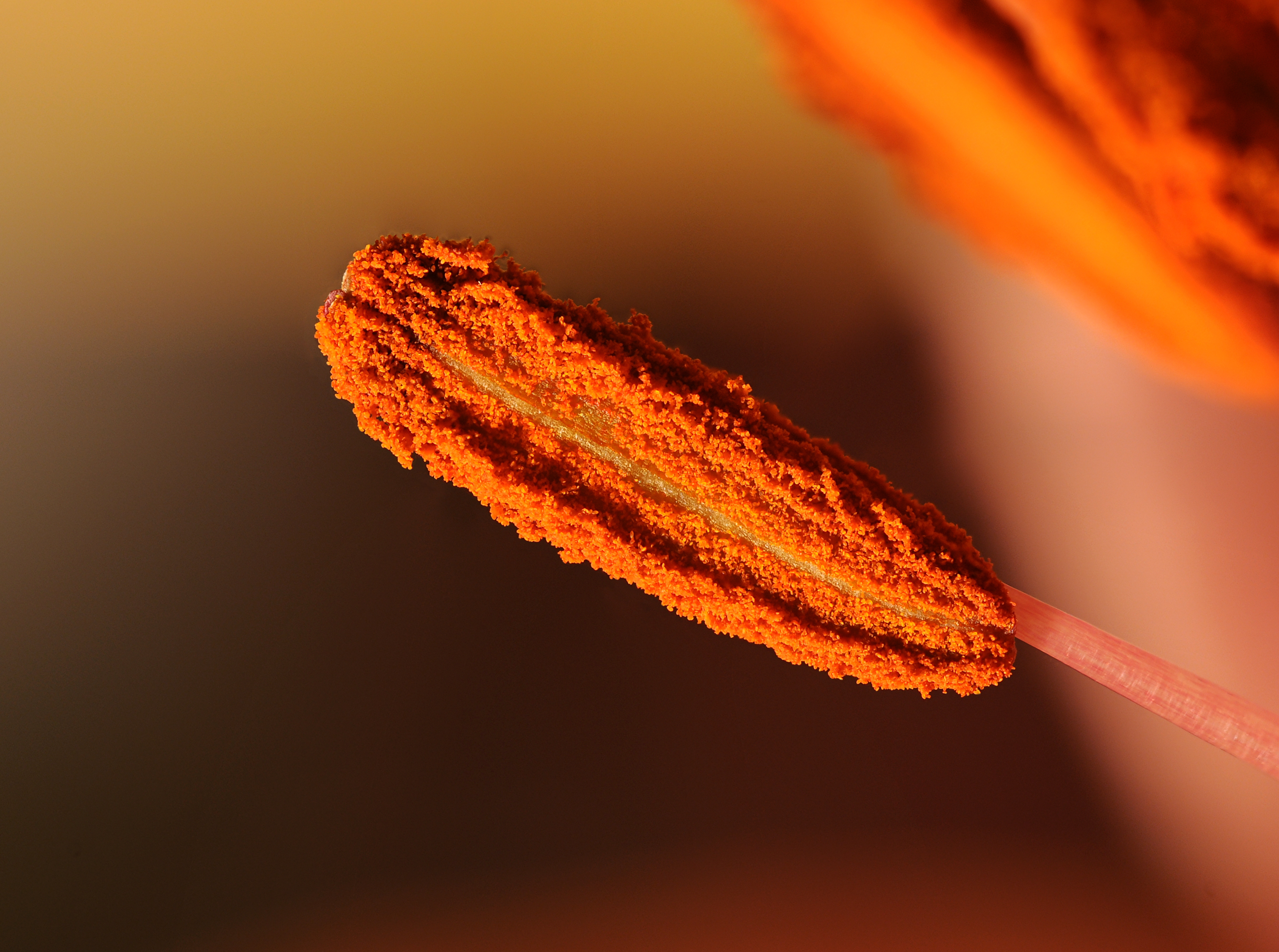
Anther of Lilium in a state of anthesis, dehiscent and releasing pollen

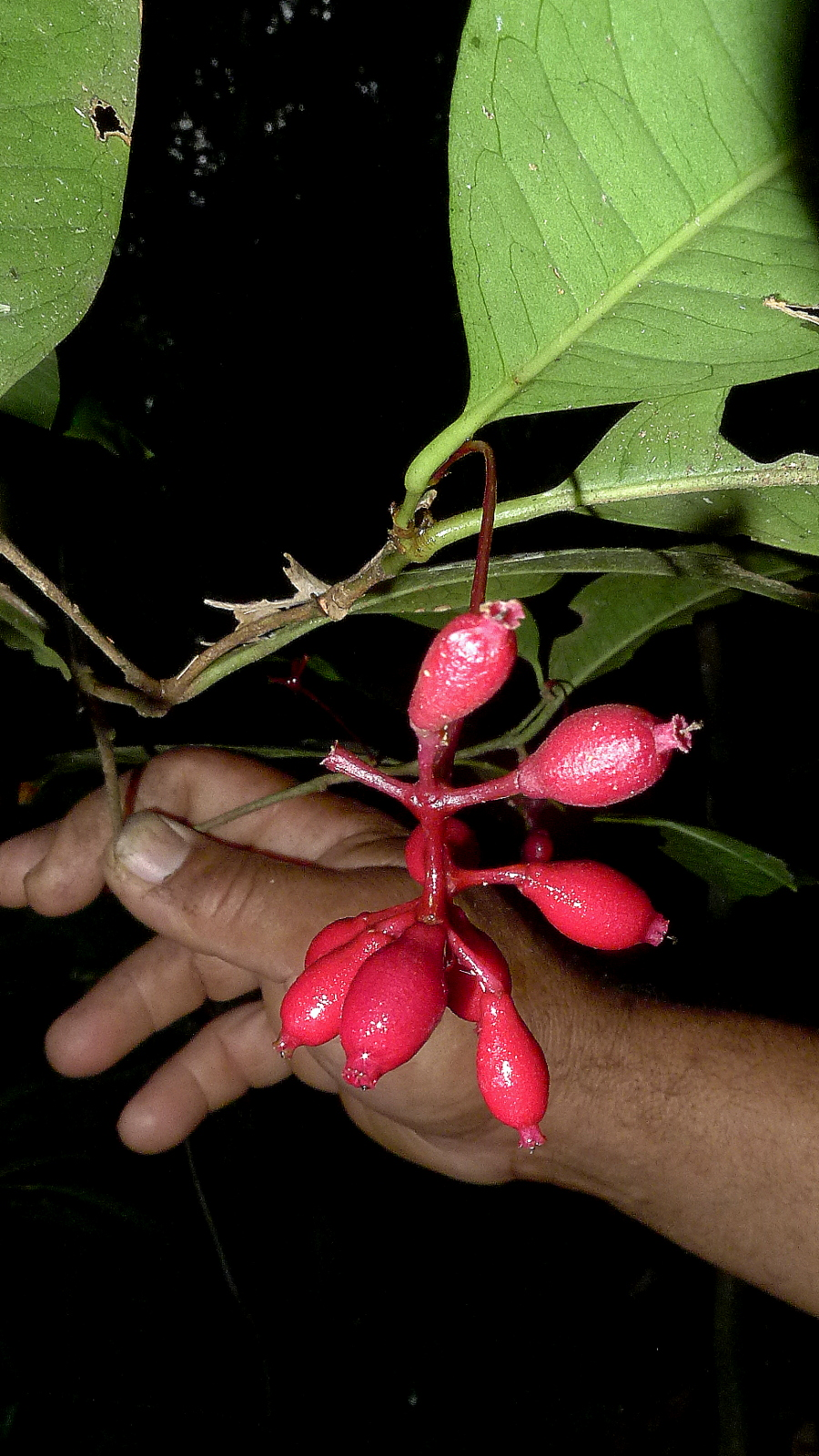
A Neea species, family Nyctaginaceae, presents an example of an anthocarp: the calyx and style remain around the ripening fruit.

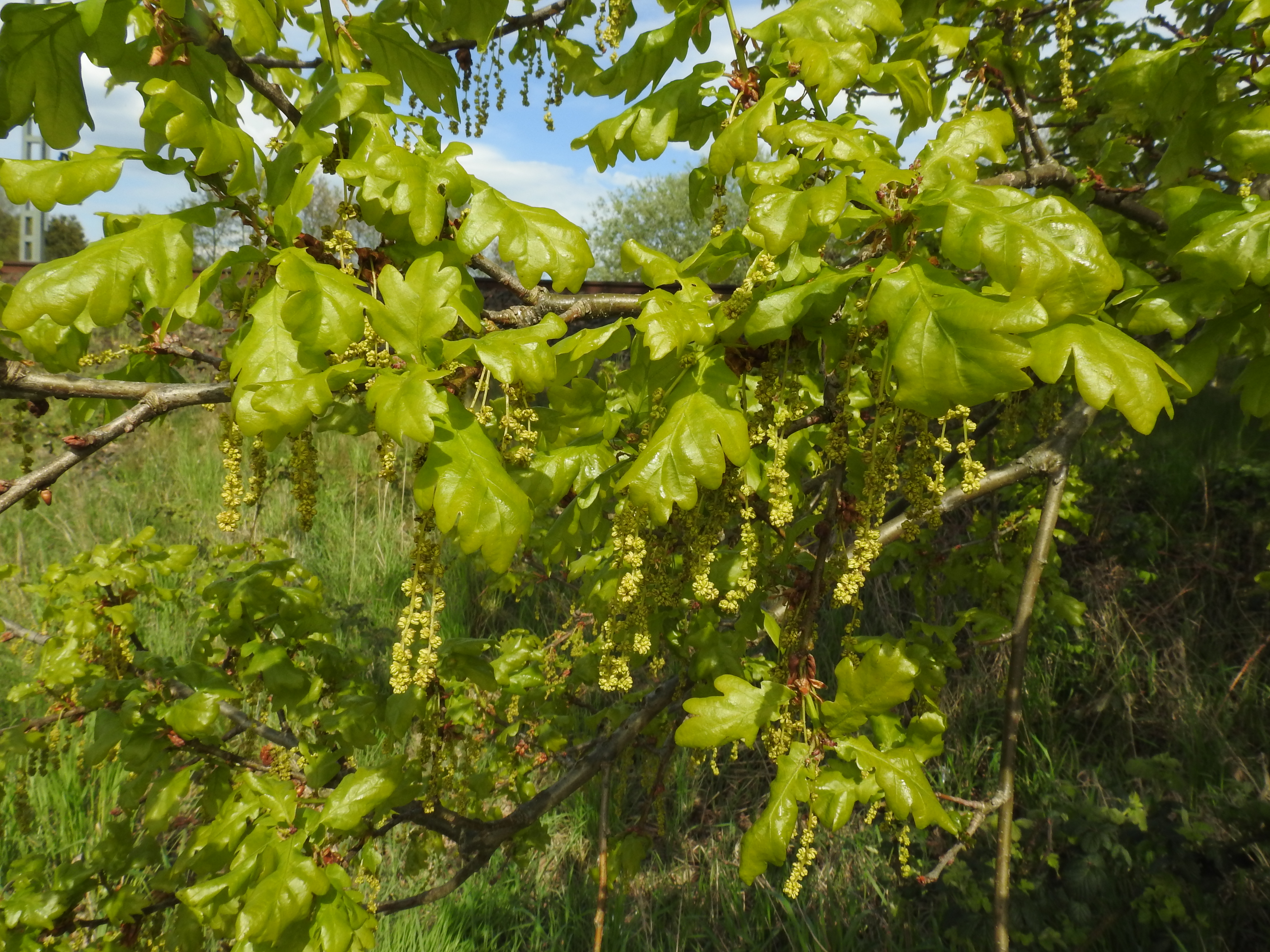
Aphananthous flowers of oaks such as Quercus robur, being anemophilous, have no need of being conspicuous to pollinating animals.

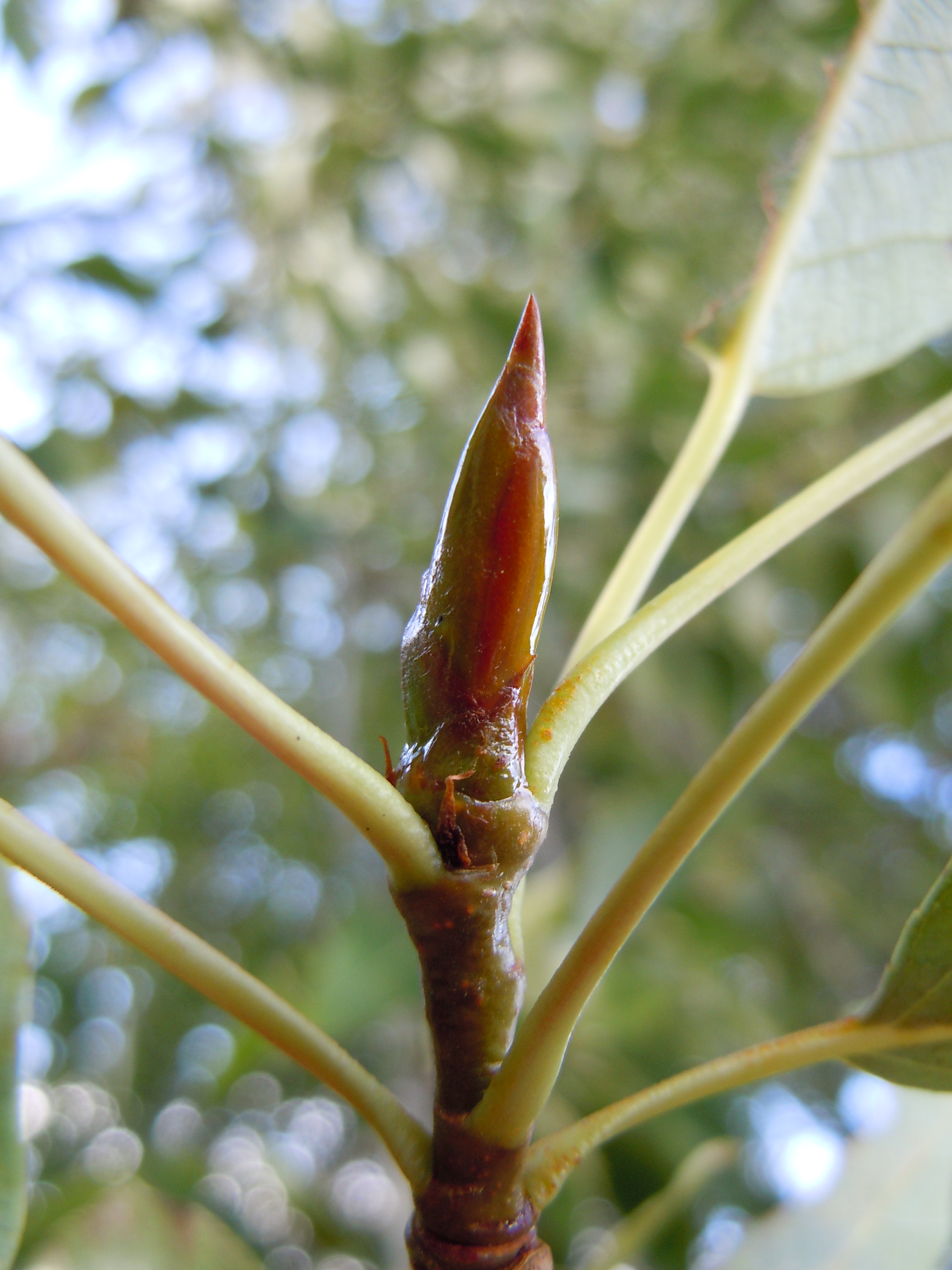
Apical bud of a Populus (poplar) shoot

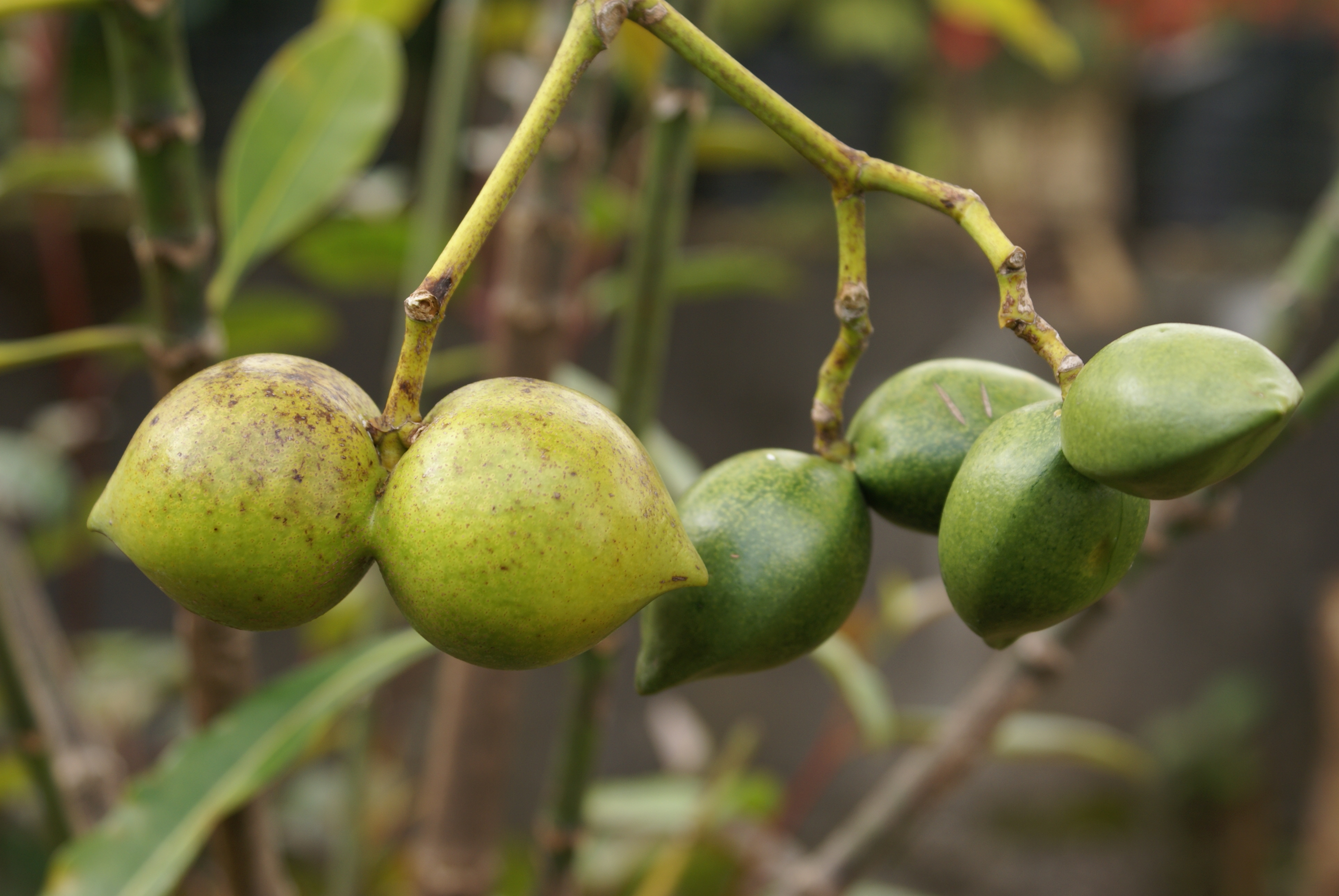
The apparently separate nuts of Ochrosia borbonica actually are apocarpous carpels, two from each flower.

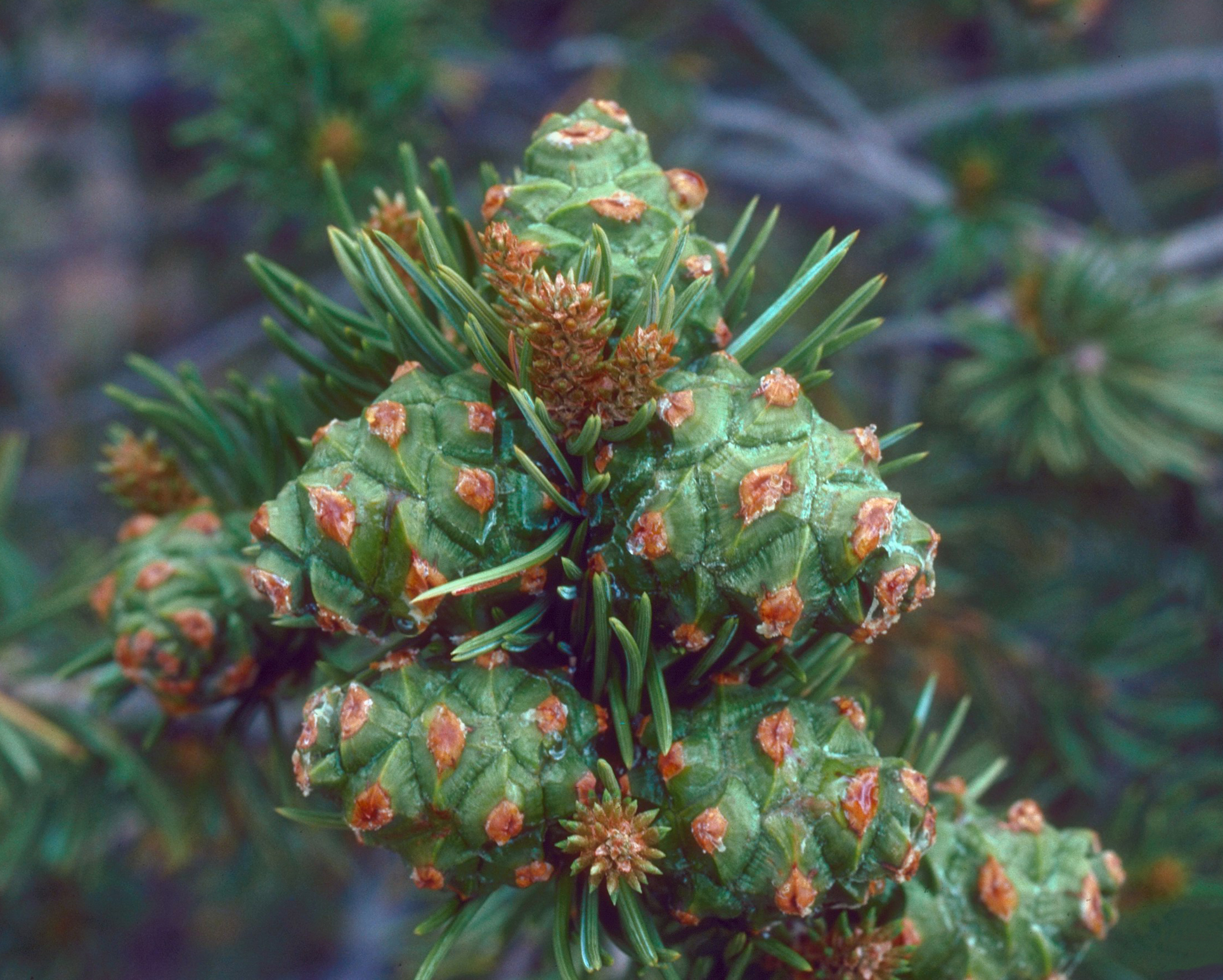
In the cones of pines, growth takes two years; in these Pinus edulis cones, the first year's growth, now brown, is the umbo, while the second year's growth, still green in these immature cones, is the apophysis.

ab-
Prefix meaning "position away from".
abaxial
Surface of an organ facing away from the organ's axis, e.g. the lower surface of a lateral organ such as a leaf or petal. Contrast adaxial.
abort
To abandon development of a structure or organ.
abscission
Natural shedding of an organ that is mature or aged, as of a ripe fruit or an old leaf.
abscission zone
Specialized layer of tissue that allows an organ to be shed by abscission when it is ripe or senescent. Such tissue is commonly formed, for example, at the base of a petiole or pedicel.
acaulescent
Having no apparent stem, or at least none visible above the ground surface. Examples include some species of Oxalis, Nolina, and Yucca. Antonym: caulescent (possessing stem).
accrescent
Increasing in size with age, such as a calyx that continues to grow after the corolla has fallen, e.g. in Physalis peruviana.
accumbent
Lying against another part of the plant; when applied to a cotyledon, it means that an edge of the cotyledon lies along the folded radicle in the seed.
-aceae
Suffix added to the word stem of a generic name to form the name of a taxonomic family; for example, Rosaceae is the rose family, of which the type genus is Rosa.
achene
Dry, one-seeded indehiscent fruit in which the true fruit is not the so-called "berry", but the achenes, which are the so-called "seeds" on the infructescence, e.g. in the genus Fragaria.
acicular
Slender or needle-shaped. See also Leaf shape.
acropetal
Moving from roots to leaves, e.g. of molecular signals in plants.
acrophyll
Regular leaves of a mature plant, produced above the base, as opposed to bathyphyll.
acrostichoid
(describing a type of sorus) Covering the entire abaxial surface of a frond, usually densely so, as in Elaphoglossum and Acrostichum.
actino-
Prefix that indicates a radial pattern, form, or morphology.
actinodromous
(of leaf venation) Palmate or radially arranged venation with three or more primary veins arising at or near the base of the leaf and reaching the margin in most species, but not all.
actinomorphic
Regular or radially symmetrical; may be bisected into similar halves in at least two planes. Applies e.g. to steles and flowers in which the perianth segments within each whorl are alike in size and shape. Compare regular. Contrast asymmetrical, irregular, and zygomorphic.
aculeate
Armed with prickles, e.g. the stem of a rose.
acumen
A long, tapering point, especially the apex of an acuminate leaf.
acuminate
Tapering gradually to a point, with concave sides approaching the point. Contrast acute and mucronate. See also Leaf shape.
acute
1. Sharply pointed, but not drawn out, with straight sides approaching the point. Contrast acuminate. See also Leaf shape.
2. Converging at an angle of less than 90°. Contrast obtuse.
ad-
Prefix meaning "near or toward"; also meaning "added to".
adaxial
Surface of an organ facing toward the organ's axis, e.g. the upper surface of a lateral organ such as a leaf or petal. Contrast abaxial.
adelphia

A bundle or structure of stamens forming one unit in an adelphous flower; for example, the stamen tube around the pistil of Hibiscus.
adelphous
Having organs, particularly filaments such as stamens, connected into one or more adelphiae, whether in the form of bunches or tubes, such as is commonly seen in families such as Malvaceae. Usage of the term is not consistent; some authors include closely bunched filaments, while others include only adelphiae in which filaments are connected minimally at their bases. See, for example, Sims: "...the filaments are so closely pressed that they have the appearance of being monadelphous...". Compare derived terms such as monadelphous, having stamens growing in a single bunch or tube, for example in Hibiscus, and diadelphous, growing in two bunches.
adherent
Slightly united to an organ of another kind, usually to a part of another whorl, e.g. a sepal connected to a petal. Contrast adnate.
adnate
Grown from or closely fused to an organ of a different kind, especially along a margin, e.g. a stamen fused to a petal. Adnate anthers have their halves attached to the filament through most of their length. Contrast connate.
adpressed
See appressed
adventitious
Produced in an unpredictable or unusual position, e.g. an adventitious bud produced from a stem rather than from the more typical axil of a leaf. Adventitious roots may develop from nodes of prostrate stems of some plant species, or from the hypocotyl rather than from the radicle of a germinating monocotyledon.
adventive
Introduced accidentally (usually referring to a weed).
aerial
Of the air; growing or borne above the surface of the ground or water.
aestivation
Arrangement of sepals and petals or their lobes in an unexpanded flower bud. Contrast vernation.
aff. (affinis)
With affinity to others, akin to; often used for a provisionally recognized but unnamed taxon considered close to that name, perhaps a hybrid or extreme variant.
aggregate fruit
Cluster of fruits formed from the free carpels of a single flower, e.g. a blackberry. Compare multiple fruit.
agochoric
Plants that are spread through accidental transport.
agricultural weed
See weed.
agriophyte
Plant species that have invaded native vegetation and could survive there without human intervention. They are established there in natural habitats, remaining part of natural vegetation even after human influence has ceased, and are independent of humans in their continued existence.
agrophic
Comb-like series of veins forking from a single side of a primary or secondary vein.
agrostology

The scientific study of grasses, in the strictest sense only those species which are members of the family Poaceae. Broader usages sometimes also include grass-like or graminoid species from the families Cyperaceae, Juncaceae, and Typhaceae.
alate
Having a wing or wings.
albumen
Older name for the endosperm of flowering plants. Except for being a storage tissue for nutrients, it is not like the albumen (egg white) of animal embryos.
albuminous
(of seeds) Containing endosperm.
-ales
Suffix added to the stem of a generic name or descriptive name to form the name of a taxonomic order.
alliant
Describes trees that for allied root or canopy ecologies, and also share or benefit from similar and mutual mycorrhizal proliferation. alliant trees root systems often coordinatewith eachother to claim territory in mixed forests and also sometomes share epigenetic information.
alien
Any plant introduced to an area outside its natural range. Often used interchangeably or in combination with foreign, exotic, non-native, and non-indigenous.
alkaloid
Any of a loosely defined class of organic compounds found in the tissues of many species of plants. Alkaloid molecules have one or more alkaline-reacting nitrogen atoms in their carbon structures. Many alkaloids are commercially important as drugs or poisons, e.g. caffeine, morphine, quinine, and strychnine, each of which occurs naturally in certain plants.
allelopathy
The secretion by a plant of biochemicals which influence the growth and reproduction of nearby plants.
allopatric
Having geographically separate, non-overlapping ranges of distribution. Contrast sympatric.
alternate
1. (adj.) (of leaves or flowers) Borne singly at different levels along a stem, including spiralled parts. Contrast opposite.
2. (prep.) Occurring between something else, e.g. stamens alternating with petals.
alternipetalous
A configuration where parts of the flower, e.g. stamens, alternate in position with the petals.
ambophily
Adapted to pollination by both wind and insects.
ament
A synonym of catkin.
amphitropous
(of an ovule) Bent so that both ends are near each other. Contrast anatropous, campylotropous, and orthotropous.
amplexicaul
With the base dilated and clasping the stem, usually of leaves.
amylum star
a vegetative propagative body filled with starch (amylum) and located around the lower nodes of certain stoneworts.
anastomose
Branching and then rejoining, as with leaf venation.
anastomosis
A connection or fusion of two or more veins that are normally diverging or branching, thereby forming a network.
anatropous
(of an ovule) Inverted so that the micropyle faces the placenta (this is the most common ovule orientation in flowering plants). Contrast amphitropous, campylotropous, and orthotropous.
ancipital
Flat, with two edges (versus round).
androdioecious
Having bisexual flowers and male flowers on separate individuals. Contrast andromonoecious, polygamodioecious, polygamomonoecious, and polygamous.
androecium
A collective name for the male reproductive parts of a flower; the stamens of a flower considered collectively. Contrast gynoecium. Abbreviated A; e.g. A 3+3 indicates six stamens in two whorls.
androgynophore
A stalk bearing both the androecium and gynoecium of a flower above the level of insertion of the perianth.
androgynous
Having male and female flowers in the same inflorescence.
androphore
The stalk or column supporting the stamens in certain flowers.
andromonoecious
Having bisexual flowers and male flowers on the same individual plant. Contrast androdioecious, gynomonoecious, polygamodioecious, polygamomonoecious, and polygamous.
anemophilous
Adapted to pollination by wind.
anemophily
Adaptation to pollination by wind.
angiosperm
A flowering plant; a plant with developing seeds enclosed in an ovary.
anisomery
The condition of having a floral whorl with a different (usually smaller) number of parts from the other floral whorls.
anisotomic
Branching, with branches having unequal diameters, such as a trunk and its branch. Contrast isotomic.
annual
A plant that completes its life cycle (i.e. germinates, reproduces, and dies) within a single year or growing season.
annulus
1. A ring-like structure; in the form of a ring. Pappus bristles are sometimes attached to a ring called an annulus or disk at the top of the achene beak. In some pollen grains, the exine around the apertures is either thicker or thinner. In pores, this border is termed an annulus. Certain flowers have ring-like constrictions at the mouth of the flower, e.g. in Huernia and Aristolochia.
2. A ring of specialized cells on the sporangium.
anterior
Positioned in front of, toward the apex. Compare distal.
anthemoid
In the Compositae, a style with a brush-like tuft of sweeping hairs at the tip of each style branch.
anther
The pollen-bearing part of a stamen.
antheridium
in bryophytes, a specialized gametophytic organ that produces the male gametes.
antheridiophore
In liverworts of the order Marchantiales, a male gametophore, a specialized, stalked structure that bears the antheridia.
antherode
A sterile anther of a staminode.
anthesis
1. (of a flower) The period during which pollen is presented and/or the stigma is receptive.
2. (of a flowering plant) The period during which flowers in anthesis are present. Not defined for some cases, such as when pollen is released in the bud.
anthocarp
A type of fruit in which some part of the flower persists attached to the pericarp, e.g. in Nyctaginaceae.
anthophore
A stalk-like structure, internode located between the calyx and the other parts of the flower.
anticlinal
Pointing up, away from, or perpendicular to a surface. Contrast periclinal.
antrorse
Directed forward or upward, e.g. of hairs on a stem. Contrast retrorse.
apetalous
Lacking petals.
apex

The tip of a structure, e.g. a leaf, shoot, stem or trunk of a tree.
aphananthous
(of flowers) Inconspicuous or unshowy, as opposed to phaneranthous or showy.
aphlebia

Imperfect or irregular leaf endings commonly found on ferns and fossils of ferns from the Carboniferous Period.
aphyllous
Leafless; having no leaves.
apical
Adjectival form of apex.
apiculate
especially of leaves, ending in a short triangular point. See also Leaf shape.
apiphily
A form of pollination whereby pollen is distributed by honey bees.
apo-
A prefix meaning "away from, separate, without".
apocarpous
(of a gynoecium) Consisting of one or more carpels which are free from one another (or almost so), e.g. in members of the Ranunculaceae and Dilleniaceae.
apomixis

A type of asexual reproduction whereby viable seeds or spores are produced asexually, without fertilization, such that the genetic material they contain is a clone of the parent's genetic material. A plant produced in this way is called an apomict.
apomorphy
In cladistics, a "different form" from the form of an ancestor (i.e., an innovation) of use in determining membership in a clade.
apopetalous
Having separate petals, not fused (sympetalous).
apophyllous
Perianth or other segments free, not united. Compare symphyllous, gamophyllous, and polyphyllous.
apophysis
1. The external part of a cone scale.
2. An outgrowth of an organ or an enlargement of a stem.
appendage
A secondary part attached to a main structure; an external growth that seldom has any obvious function, hence appendiculate.
appendiculate
Having the nature of or bearing appendages.
appressed
Pressed closely but not fused, e.g. leaves against a stem.
aquatic plant
A plant whose natural habitat is water, living in or on water for all or a substantial part of its lifespan; generally restricted to fresh or inland waters.
arachnoid
Cobwebby, from being covered with fine white hairs.
arborescent
Tree-like in growth or general appearance.
arboretum

A taxonomically arranged collection of trees.
archaeophyte
A non-native plant that has nonetheless been present in a particular geographic area for some time. Contrast neophyte.
archegonium

A multicellular haploid structure or organ of the gametophyte phase of certain plants, producing and containing the ovum or female gamete. The corresponding male organ is called the antheridium.
archegoniophore
In liverworts of the order Marchantiales, a female gametophore: a specialized, stalked structure that bears the archegonia and the sporophytes.
arctotoid
In the Compositae, a style with a ring of sweeping hairs borne on the shaft of the style proximal to the style branches.
areolate
Having or being composed of areoles, as an areolate crustose lichen.
areole
1. A space between the threads of a net, e.g. that part of a leaf surface defined by each of the elements of a vein network; as with cacti, the area between the veinlets of a leaf.
2. A structure on the stem node of a cactus, morphologically a specialised branch; the region of a cactus upon which spines, glochids, and flowers are borne.
aril
A membranous or fleshy appendage formed by expansion of the funicle which partly or wholly covers a seed, e.g. the fleshy outer layer of lychee fruit, or that found in members of the Sapindaceae.
aristate
With a stiff, bristle-like awn or tip. See also Leaf shape.
article
A segment of a jointed stem or of a fruit with constrictions between the seeds; an organ part that separates easily from the rest of the organ at a joint or articulation.
articulate
Jointed; separating freely, leaving a clean scar; e.g. the fronds of certain ferns where they join the rhizome.
ascending
1. (of a stem) Spreading horizontally, then directed upward; an ascending stem is more or less prostrate near its base, then erect.
2. (of an ovule) Attached somewhat above the base.
ascidiate
Shaped like a pitcher, as with the leaves of pitcher plants, e.g. species of Nepenthes and Sarracenia.
asexual reproduction
Reproduction that does not involve gametes. Often used interchangeably with vegetative reproduction.
asperulous
Having a rough, sandpapery texture; e.g. some leaf surfaces.
asymmetrical
Irregular or unequal; lacking any plane of symmetry; e.g. flowers of Canna.
attenuate
Narrowing gradually. See also Leaf shape.
auricle
An ear-shaped lobe, particularly a small, roundish, lateral appendage of a leaf or leaf-like organ.
auriculate
Attached at the base with ear-shaped appendages (auricles). See also Leaf shape.
autogamous
Self-pollinating, self-fertilizing – in flowering plants
awn
1. Any long, bristle-like appendage.
2. In the Poaceae, an appendage terminating or on the back of glumes or lemmas of some grass spikelets.
3. In the Geraniaceae, the part of the style that remains attached to the carpel that separates from the carpophore (column).
4. A generally straight, stiff pappus element, varying from stiffly bristle-like to hard and needle-like. In Strophanthus, the awn is the beak of the seed, stipe of the coma hairs.
axil
The upper angle between one part of a plant and another, e.g. the stem and a leaf.
axile
On an axis; of a placenta, on the central axis of the ovary.
axillary
Borne in or arising from the axil, usually referring to the axil of a leaf.
axis
The main stem of a whole plant or inflorescence; also, the line along which this stem extends.
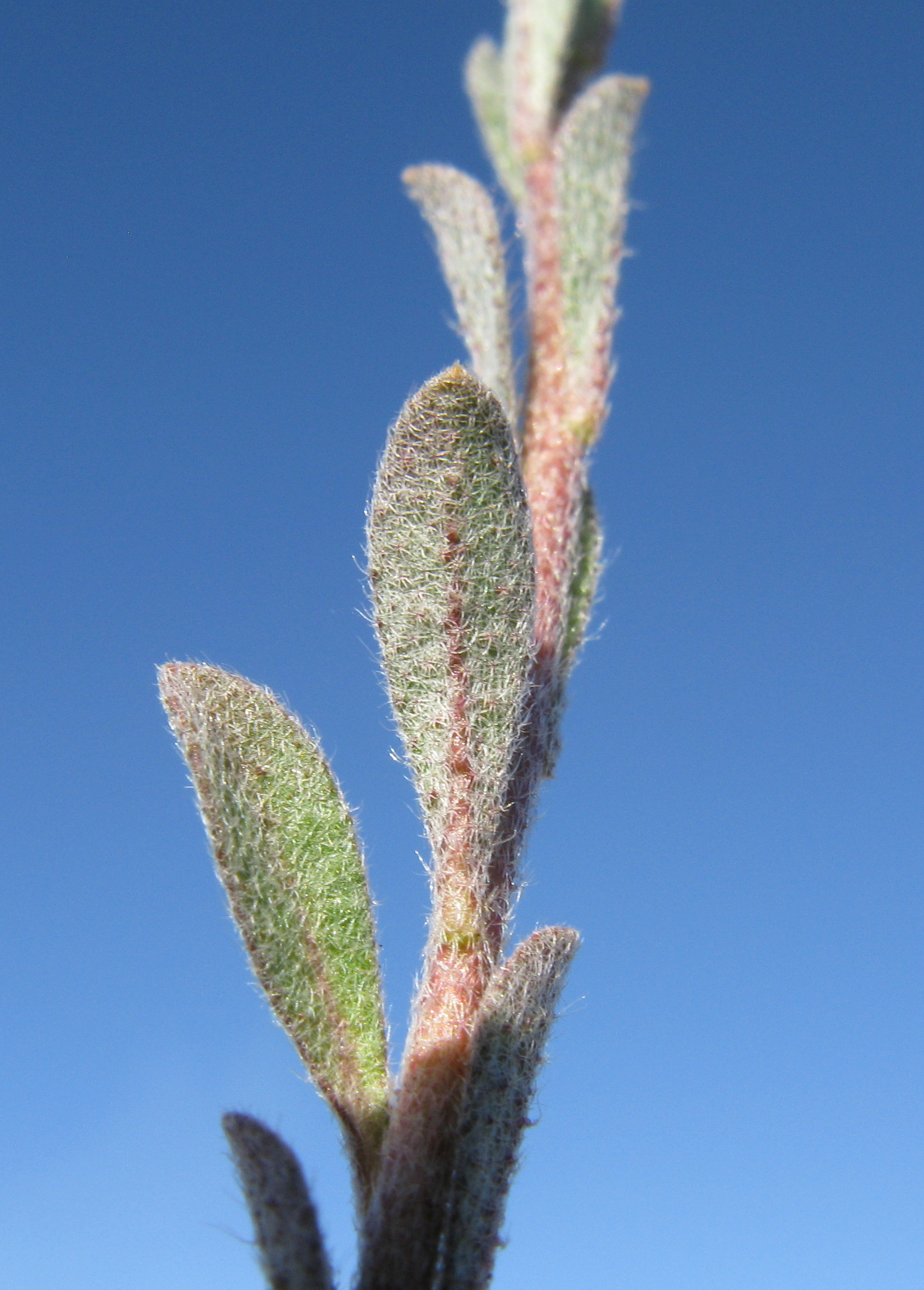
Hairs on the leaves of Meniocus linifolius (formerly Alyssum linifolium) are stellate and appressed to the leaf surface.

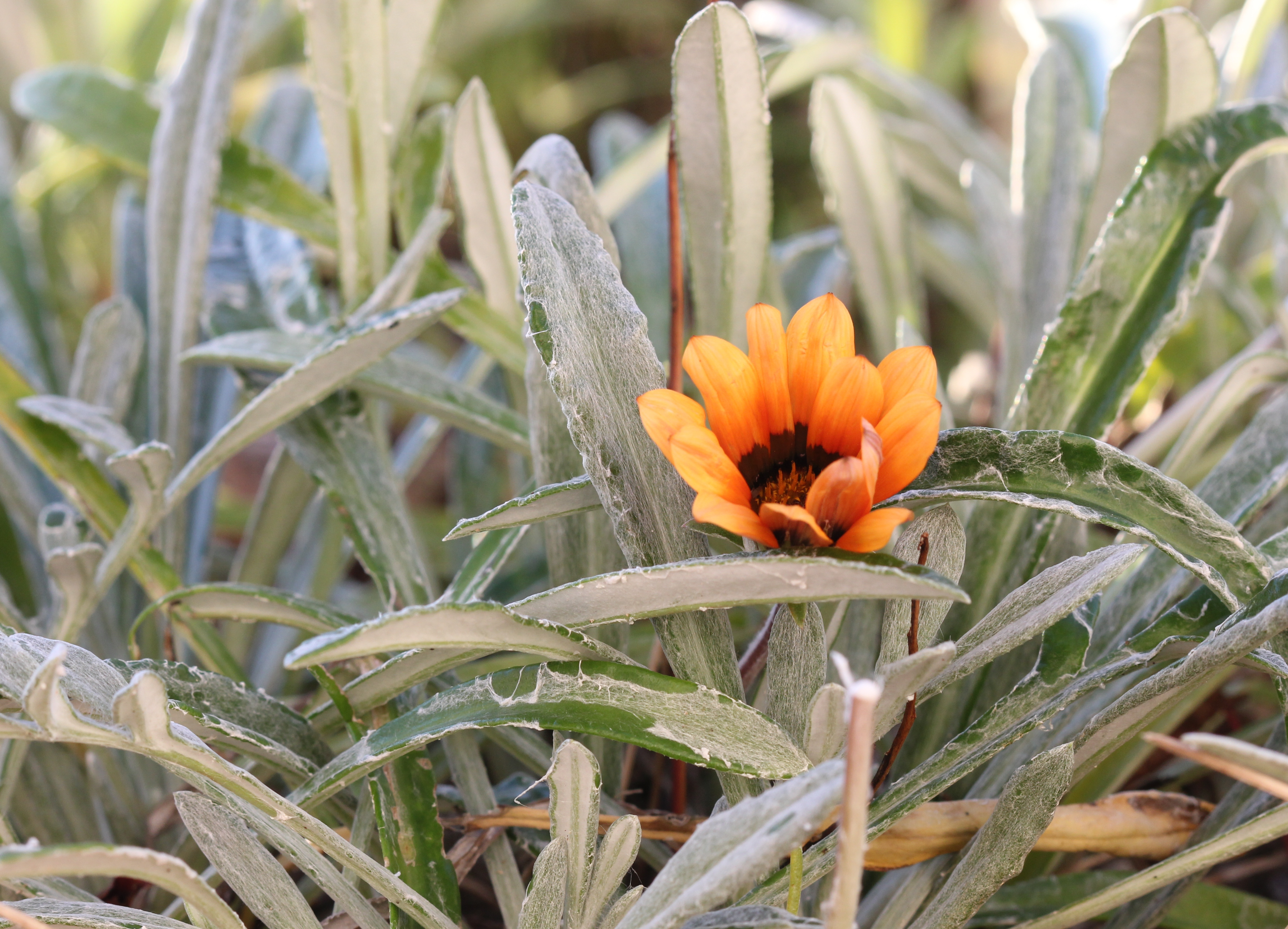
Arachnoid leaves of an unidentified Gazania species

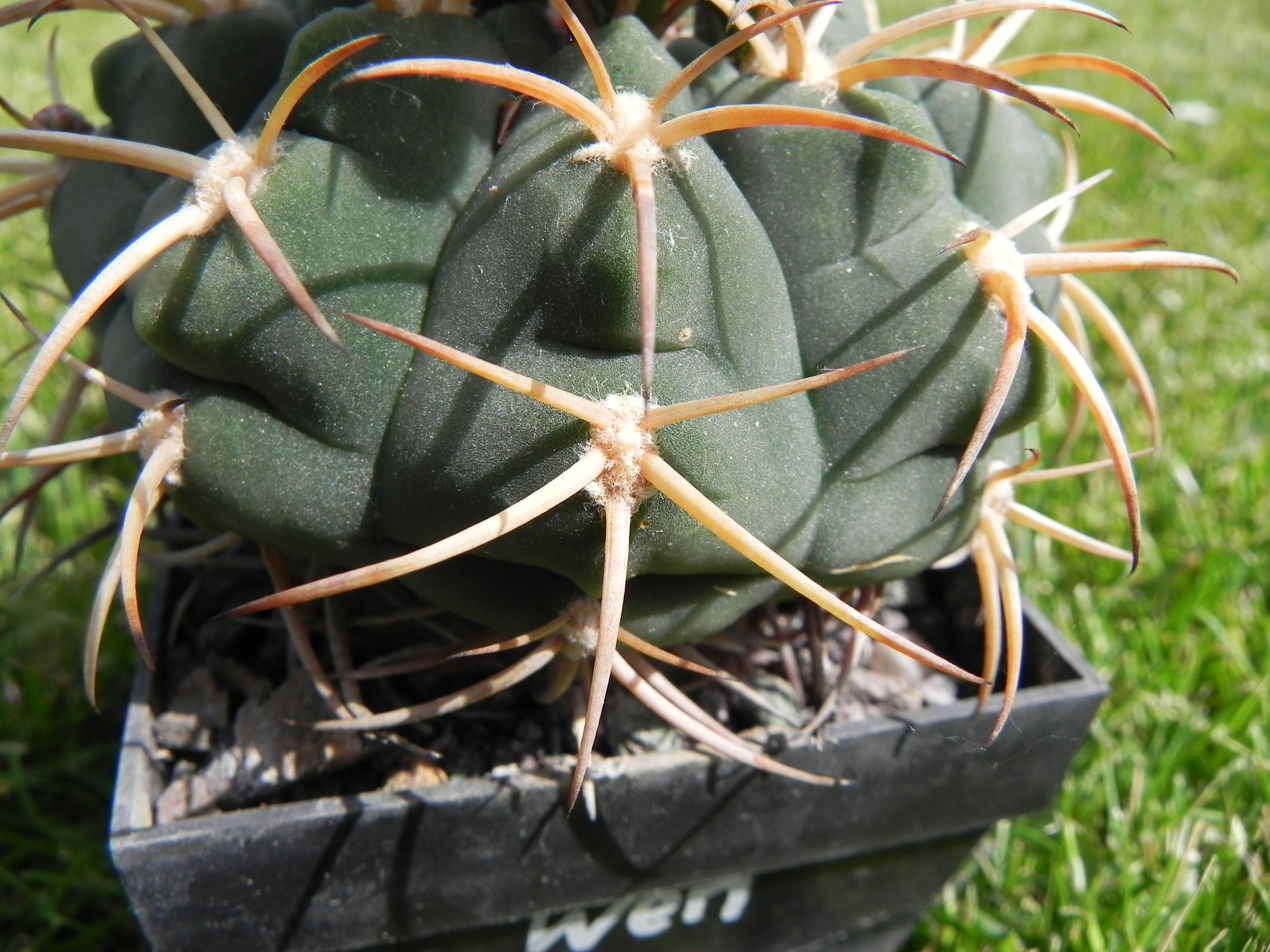
Spines of cactus Gymnocalycium bayrianum emerging from the areoles of the stem nodes

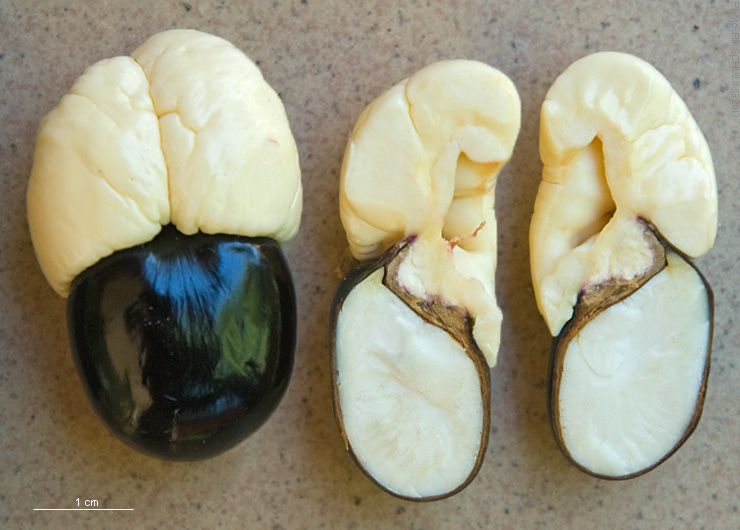
Seeds of a species of Blighia (ackee), one whole and one in longitudinal section, showing the pale aril

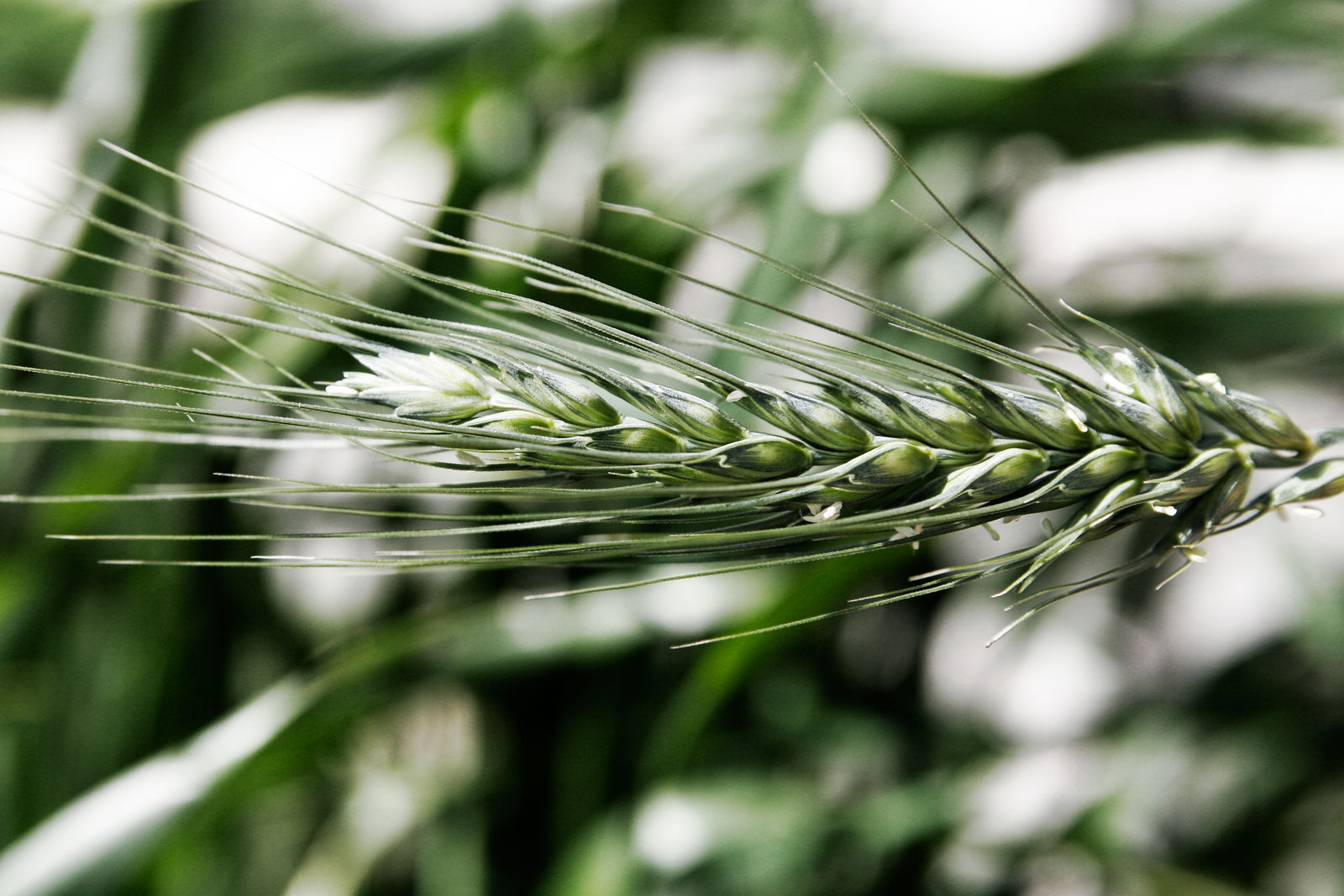
Infructescence of wild rye, showing prominent awns

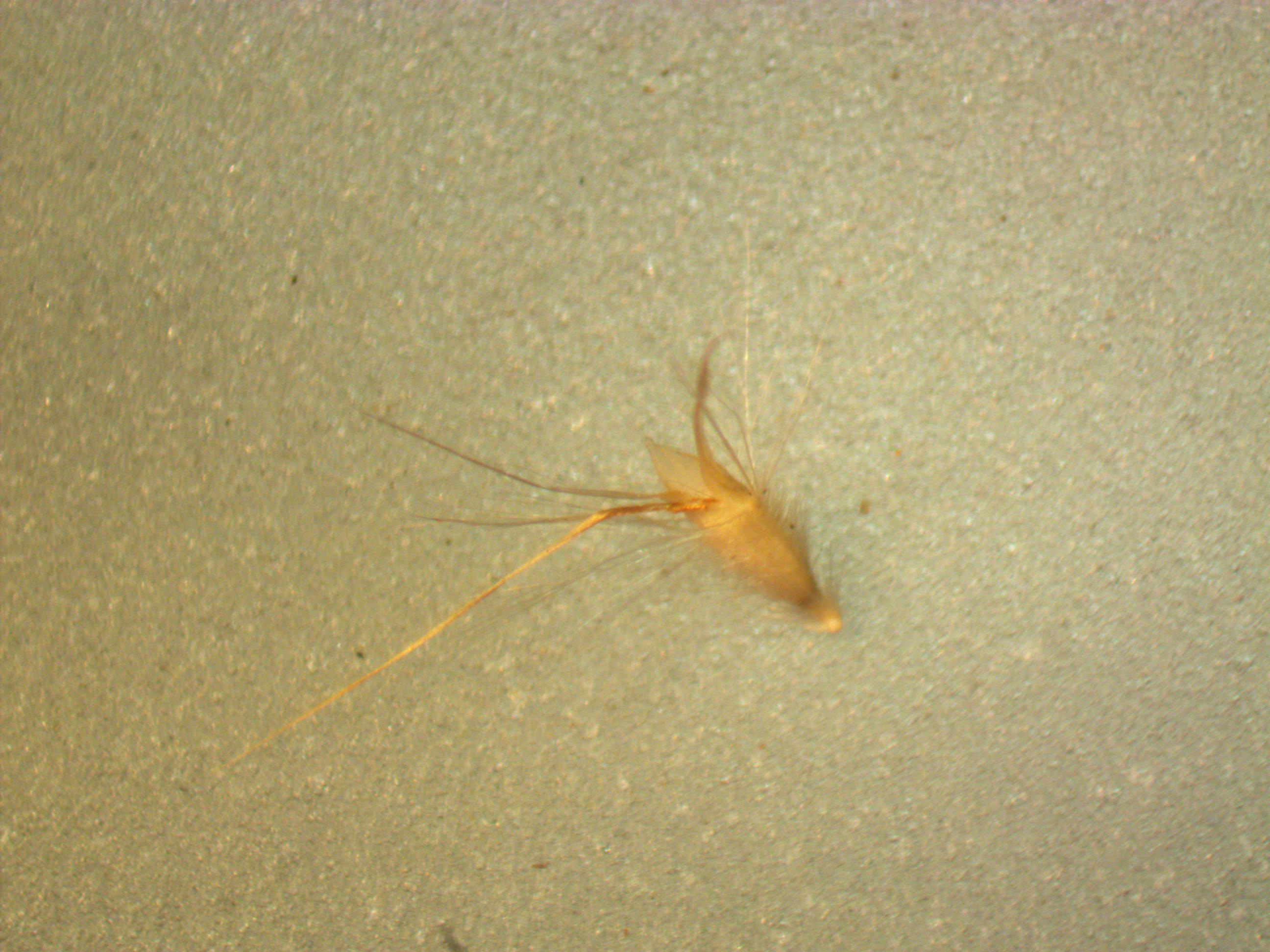
Anatomy of an awn and bristles on a species of the Australian grass Rytidosperma longifolium

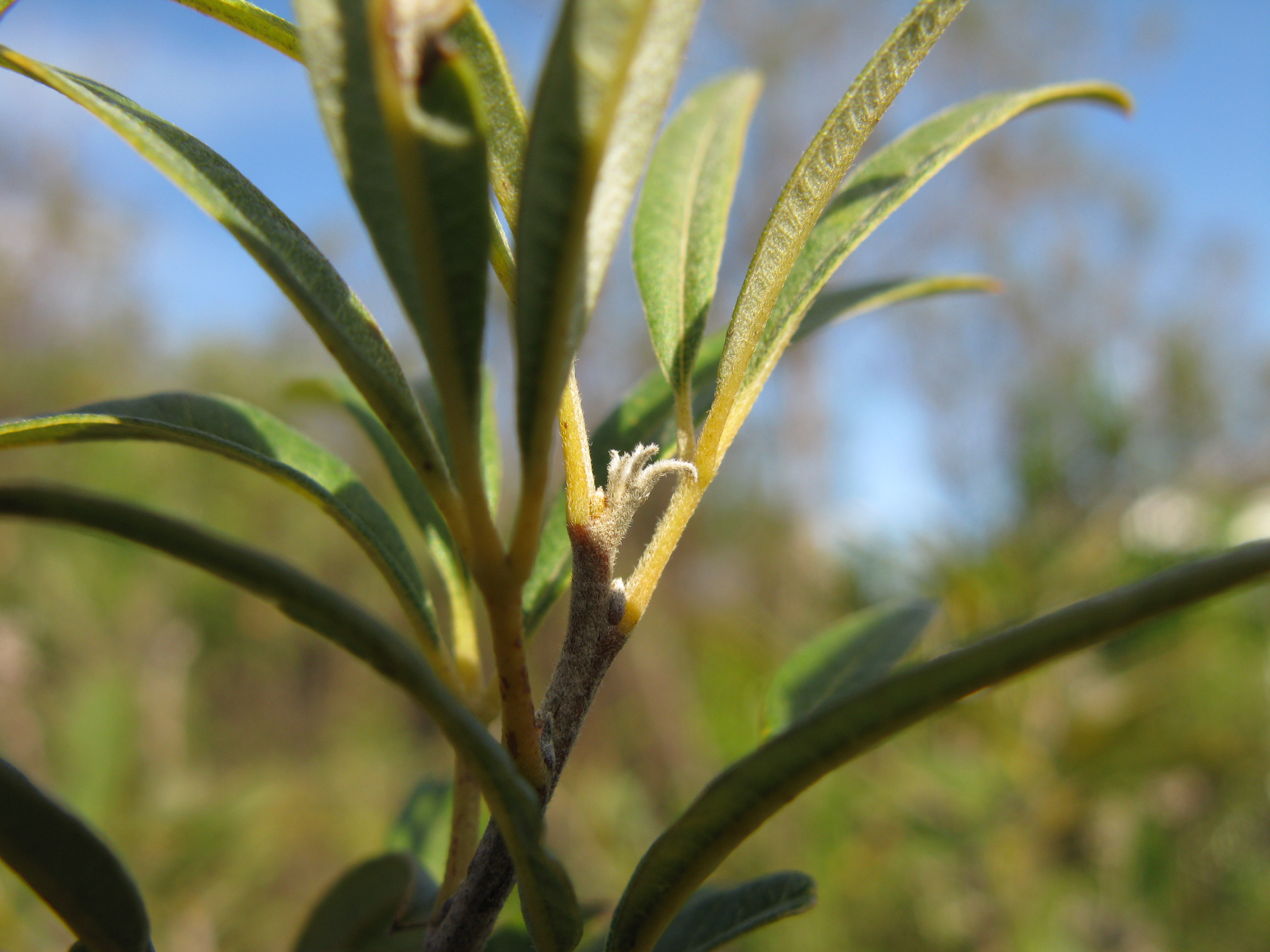
Axillary buds in leaf

== B ==
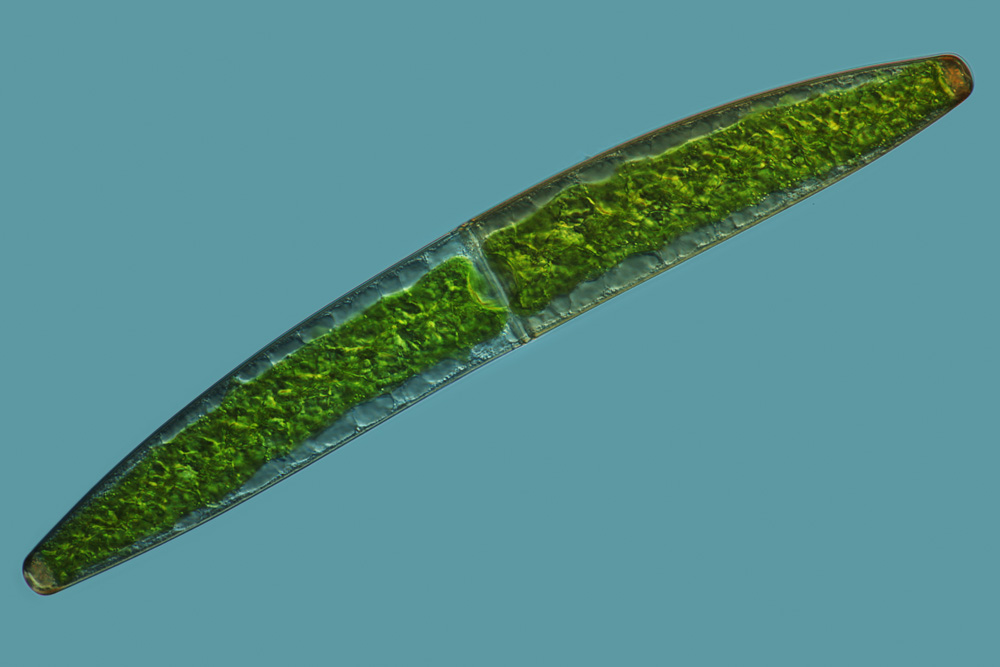
Baculiform desmid in genus Closterium

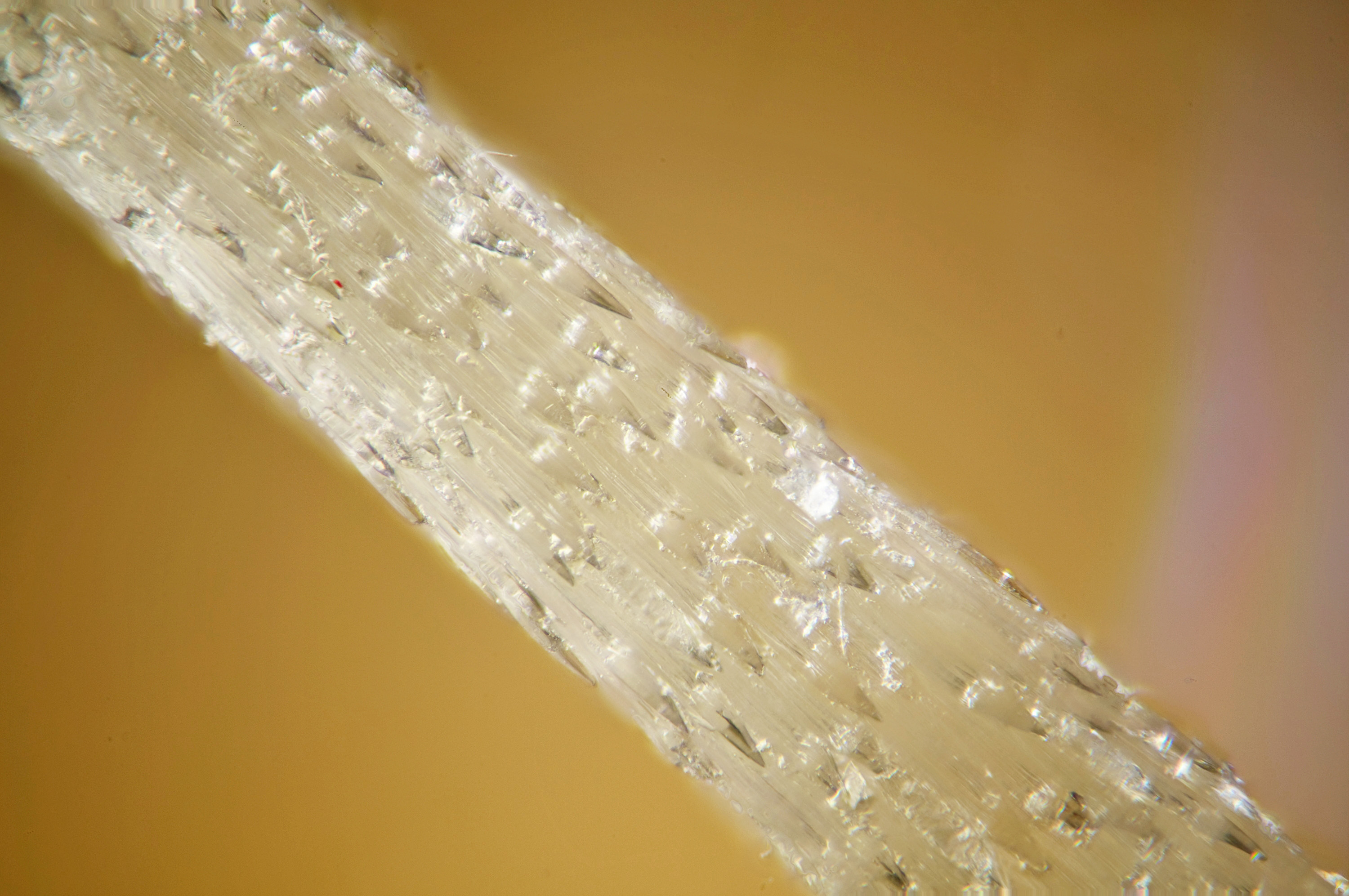
Barbs occur on the spines of some species of cactus, as shown here, enlarged.

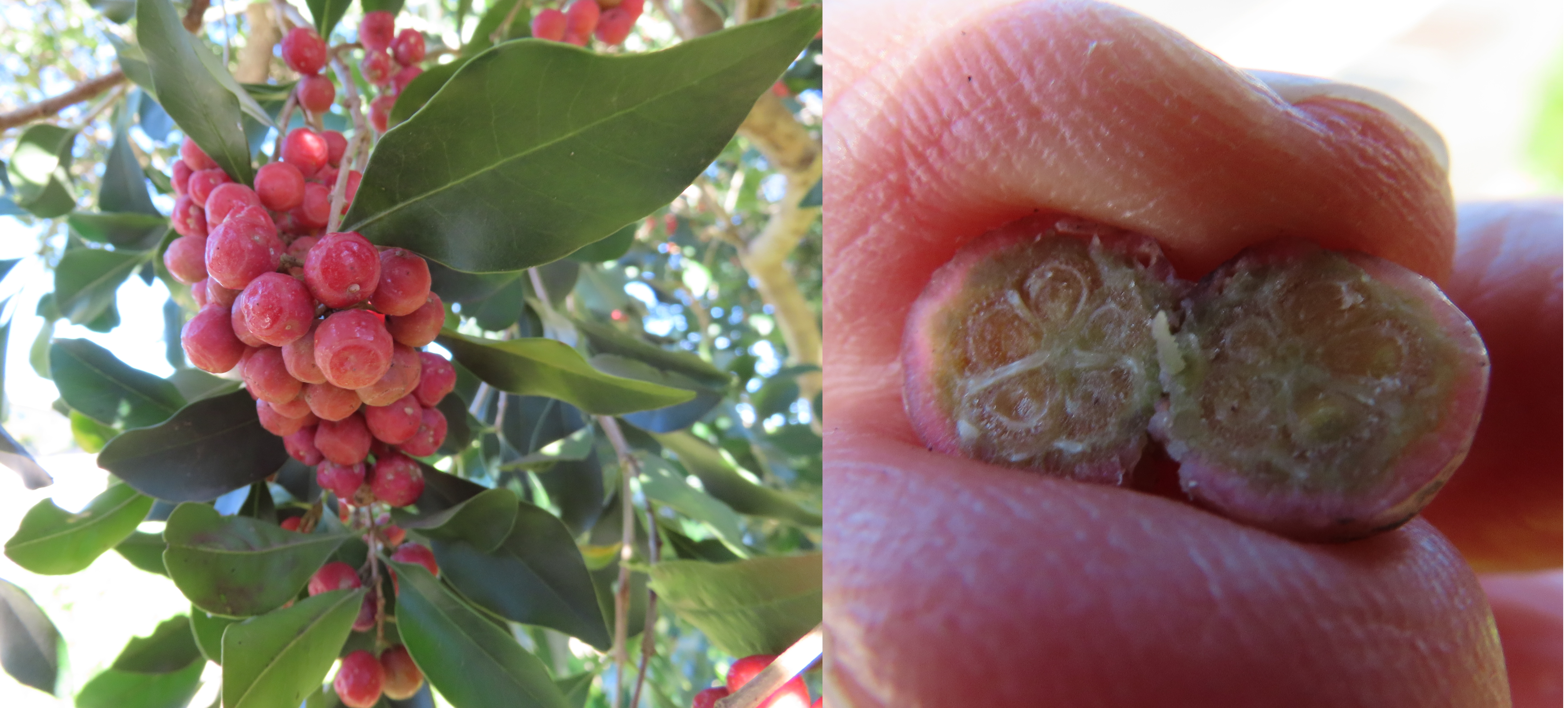
Berries of Olinia ventosa, including a cross-section showing hard seeds in the pulp

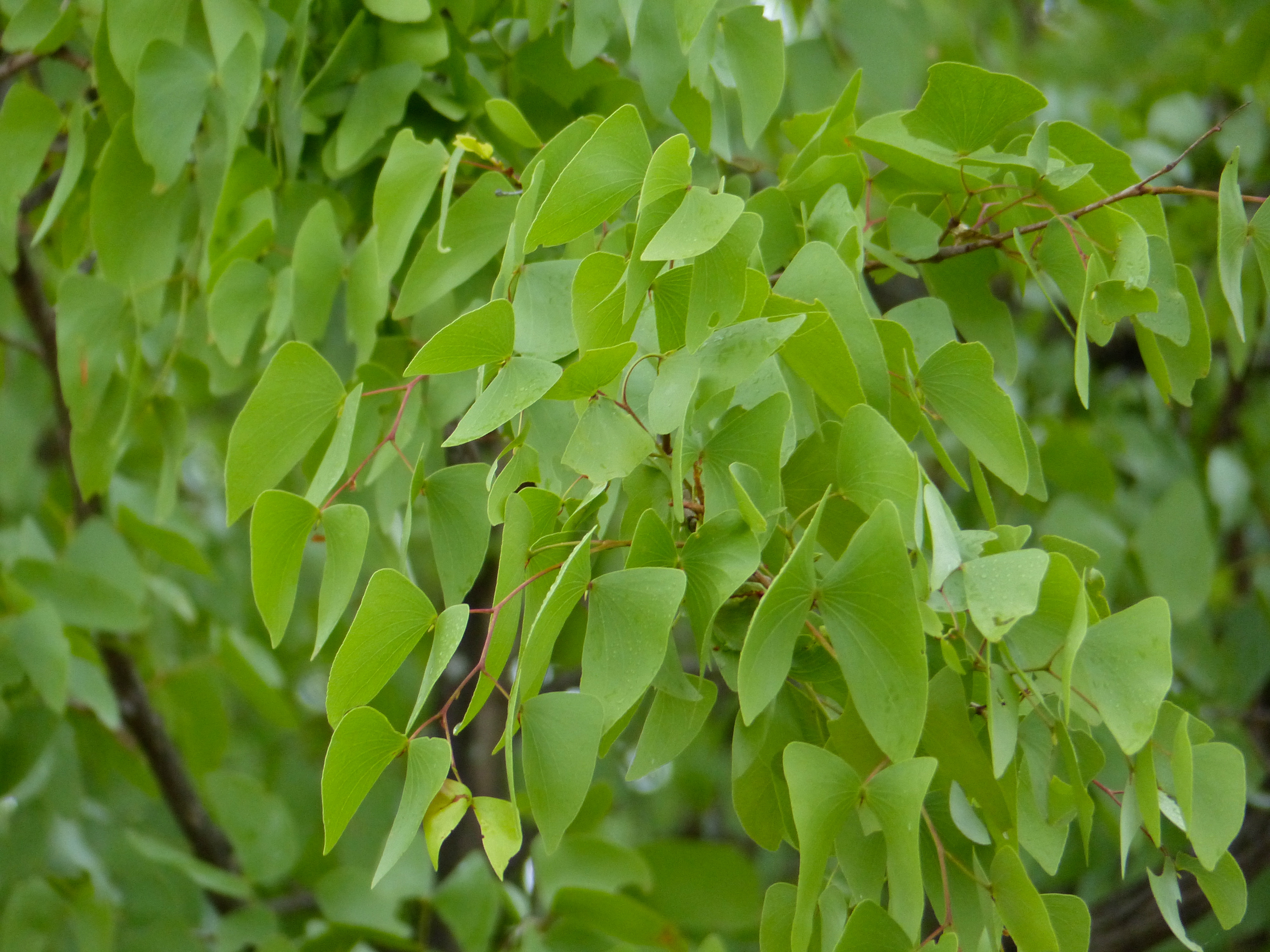
The bifoliate compound leaves of the mopane tree, Colophospermum mopane, suggest the common name "butterfly tree".

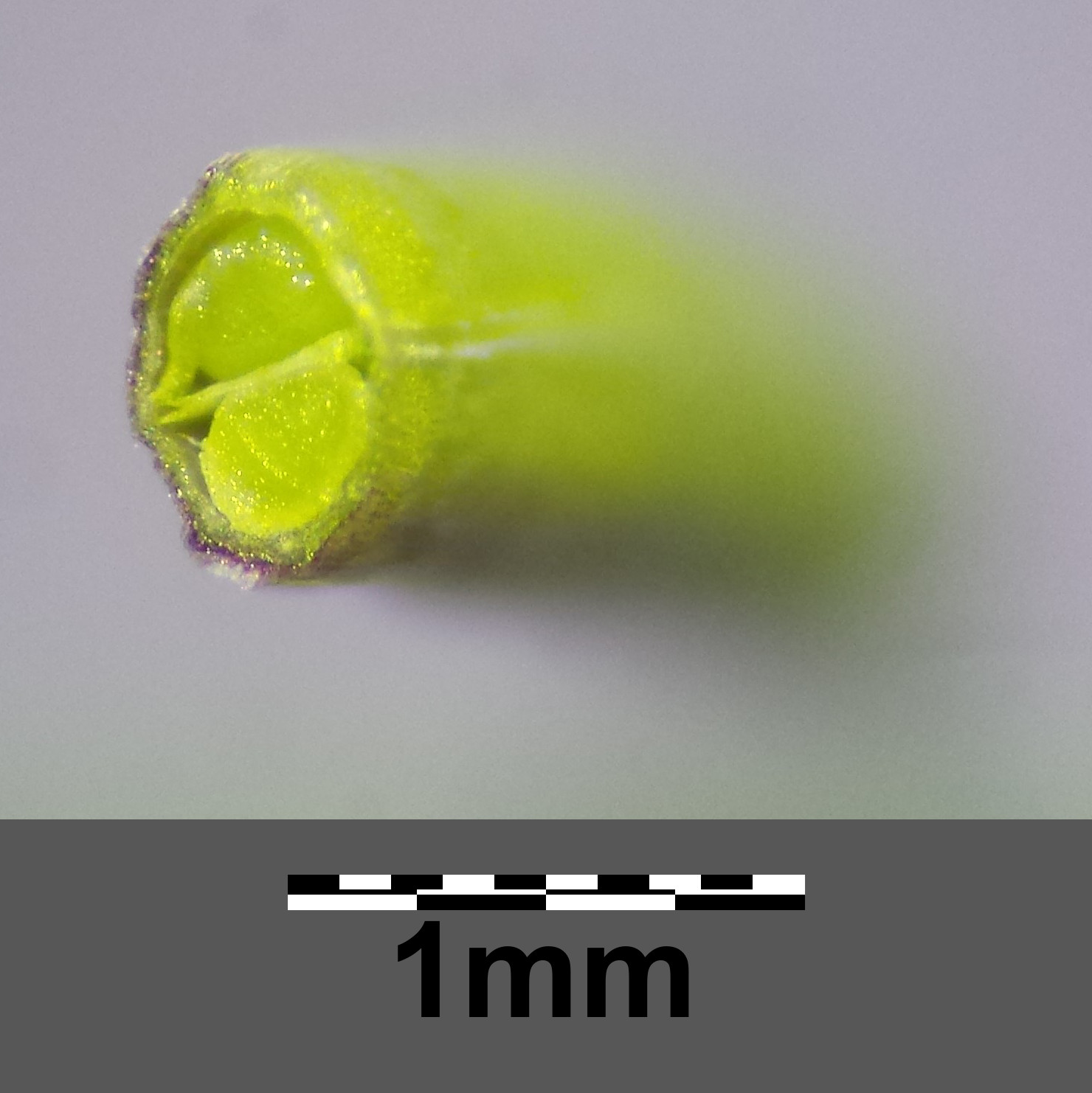
Cross-section of a silique of Arabidopsis thaliana, showing it to be biloculate, formed of two carpels, morphologically a silique and not a pod

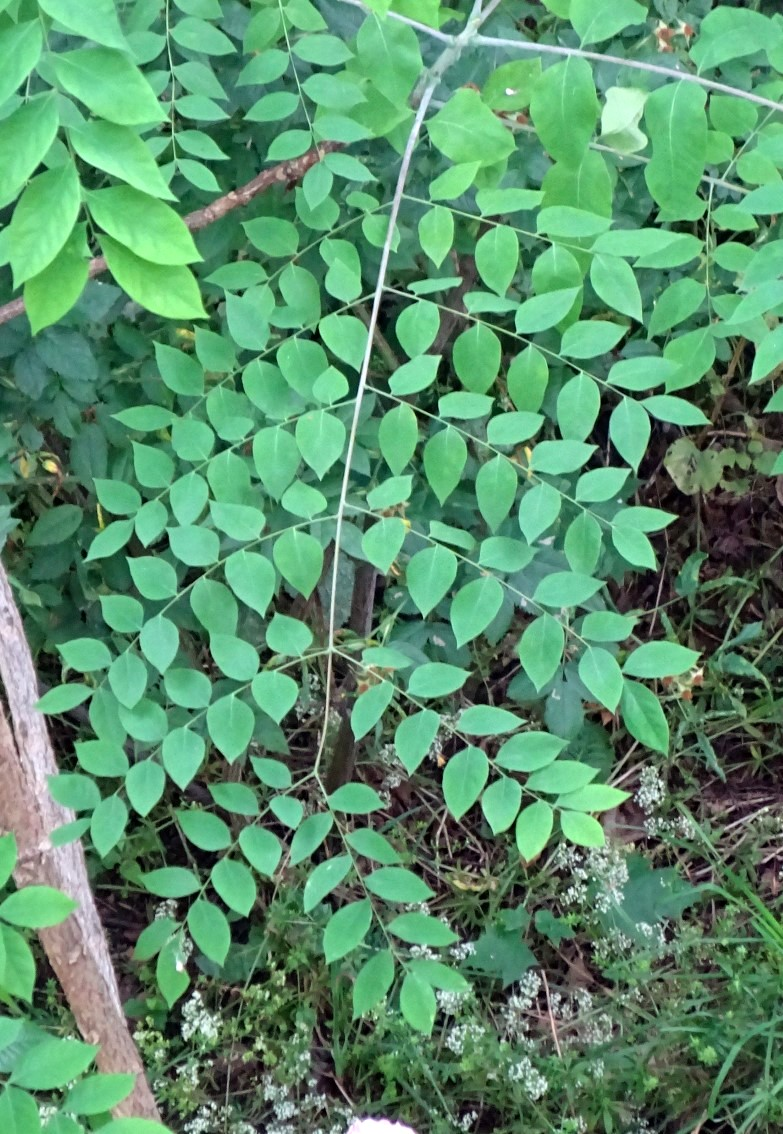
Bipinnate leaf of Gymnocladus dioicus

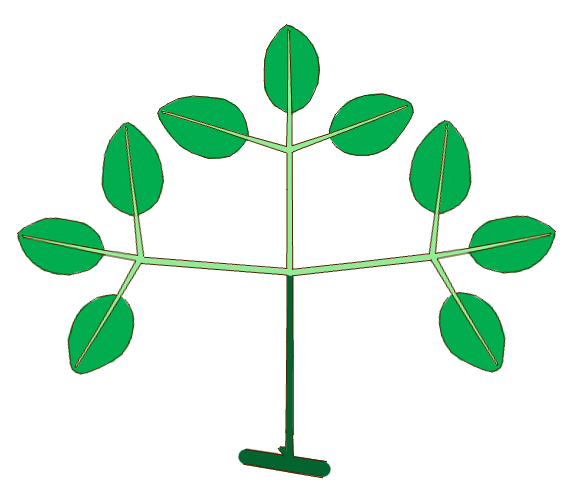
Structure of a biternate compound leaf

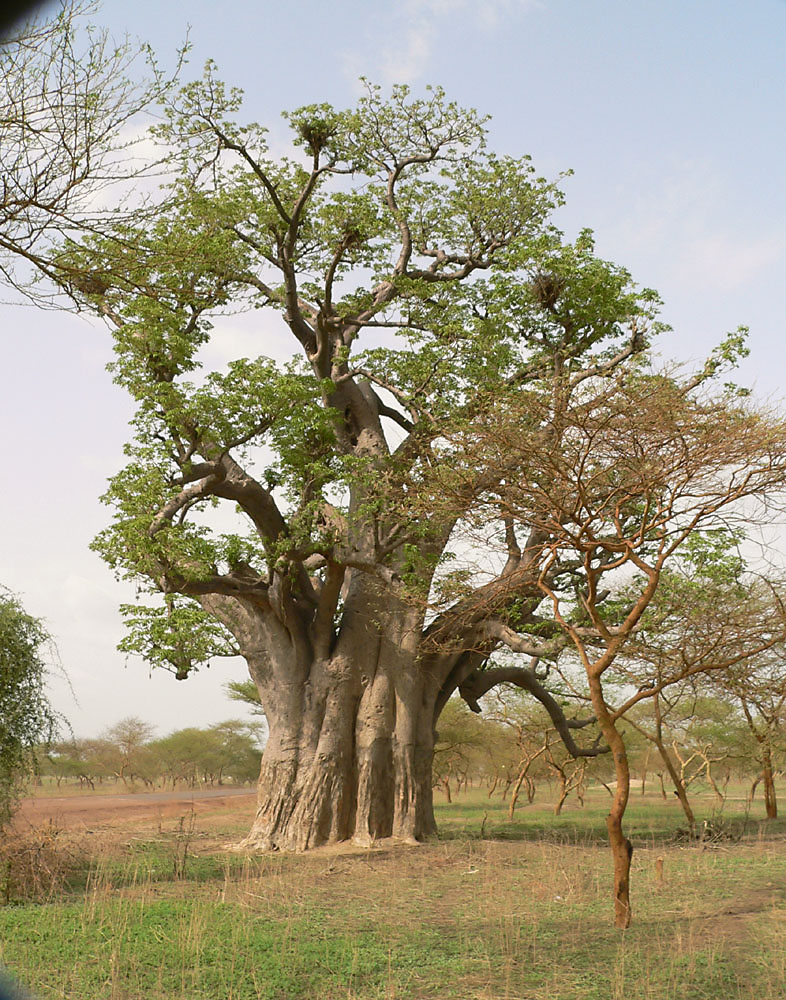
This African baobab, Adansonia digitata, has an enormous bole beneath a relatively modest canopy that is typical of this species.

baccate
Fruit appearing like a berry that may or may not be a true berry.
baculiform
Rod-like; longer than wide. Compare cylindrical.
barb
A rear-facing point, as in a fish hook.
barbed
Having barbs pointing in one direction.
barbellate
Having barbed hairs (barbellae).
bark
The protective external layer of tissue on the stems and roots of woody trees and shrubs; includes all of the living and non-living tissue external to the cambium.
basal
Situated or attached at or close to the base (of a plant or a phylogenetic tree diagram).
basifixed
Something attached by its base, e.g. an anther attached to the filament. Compare dorsifixed.
basipetal
Developing sequentially from the apex toward the base (i.e. with the youngest toward the base), e.g. of flowers in an inflorescence. Also, moving from leaves to roots, e.g. of molecular signals in plants.
bathyphyll
A specialized leaf produced at the base of a plant, usually when the plant is immature, and which serves to anchor the plant to a substrate; especially notable in the fern Teratophyllum. Contrast acrophyll.
beak
A prominent, pointed terminal projection, especially of a carpel or fruit.
berry
A type of indehiscent fruit with the seeds immersed in the pulp, e.g. a tomato.
bi-
A prefix meaning "two", e.g. bisulcate, having two sulci or grooves.
biennial
A plant which completes its life cycle (i.e. germinates, reproduces, and dies) within two years or growing seasons. Biennial plants usually form a basal rosette of leaves in the first year and then flower and fruit in the second year.
bifid
Forked; cut in two for about half its length. Compare trifid.
bifoliate
(of a compound leaf) Having precisely two leaflets, usually in a symmetrical pair, e.g. a leaf of Colophospermum mopane. Compare jugate lobed leaf, e.g. most species of Bauhinia.
bifusiform
Fusiform with a pinch in the middle.
bilabiate
Having two lips, e.g. the form of the petals in many irregular flowers.
bilateral
1. Having two distinguishable sides, such as the two faces of a dorsiventral leaf.
2. Arranged on opposite sides, e.g. leaves on a stem; Compare distichous and opposite.
3. Bilaterally symmetrical, as in a leaf with a symmetrical outline.
biloculate
Having two loculi, e.g. in anthers or ovaries.
binomial
Making use of names consisting of two words to form the scientific name (or combination) in a Latin form. For example, where the first is the name of the genus to which the species belongs, and the second is the specific epithet given to that species to distinguish it from others in the same genus.
binomial nomenclature
The system of nomenclature in which the scientific name of a species (and not of a taxon at any other rank) is a combination of two names, the first name being the generic name. The second name is referred to botanically as the specific epithet. Note that the two names together (not just the second name) constitute the species name.
bipinnate
Doubly pinnate; e.g. a compound leaf with individual leaflets pinnately divided.
bipinnatisect
A pinnatisect leaf with deeply dissected segments.
bisexual
Bearing both male and female reproductive organs; usually, flowers with both stamens and carpels; synonymous with hermaphrodite, synoecious, and monoclinous. Bisexual flowers occur only on monoecious plants. See also androgynous, monoicous, and plant reproductive morphology.
bitegmic
(of an ovule) Covered by two integuments. Contrast unitegmic.
biternate
Ternate, with each division divided into three.
bivalve
Having two valves or hinged parts. Contrast trivalve.
blade
The lamina or flattened part of a leaf, excluding the stalk or petiole.
bloom
A fine white or bluish waxy powder occurring on plant parts, usually stems, leaves, and fruits. It is easily removed by rubbing.
bole
The trunk of a tree, usually the portion below the lowest branch. Compare canopy.
bostrychoid
Arranged on a conical surface (like a snail shell); used to describe inflorescences in which the buds are arranged in an almost helical manner on the outside of a long, tapering, conical rachis.

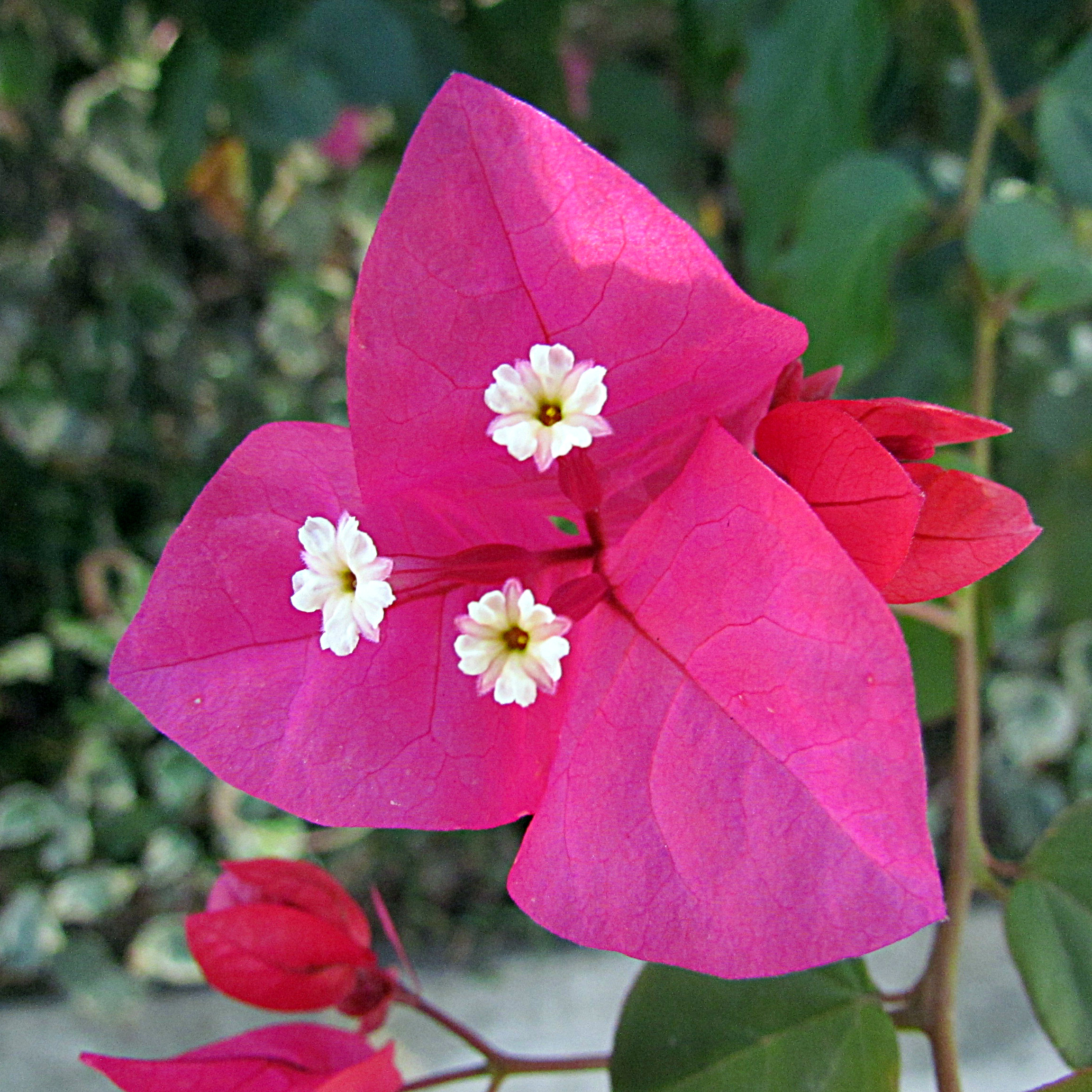
Bracts of Bougainvillea commonly mistaken for petals

bract
A modified leaf associated with a flower or inflorescence and differing in shape, size, or color from other leaves (and without an axillary bud).
bracteate
Possessing bracts.
bracteole
A small bract borne singly or in pairs on the pedicel or calyx; synonymous with bractlet.
bracteolate
Possessing bracteoles (bractlets).
bracteose
Having many or showy bracts.
bractlet
See bracteole.
branchlet
A small branch.
brevideciduous
A plant that loses all of its leaves only briefly before growing new ones, so that it is leafless for only a short time, e.g. approximately two weeks.
bristle
A straight, stiff hair (smooth or with minute teeth); the upper part of an awn (when the latter is bent and has a lower, stouter, and usually twisted part, called the column).
brochidodromous
Pinnate leaf venation in which the secondary veins do not terminate at the leaf margin, but are joined in a succession of prominent arcs.
brochus

Width of one lumen of a pollen grain reticulum and half of the width of the surrounding muri (walls), hence heterobrochate and homobrochate, where the lumina are of different or similar sizes, respectively.
bryophyte
Informally, any plant that is a moss, hornwort, or liverwort. Formally, these plants are placed in three separate divisions: hornworts (Anthocerophyta), liverworts (Marchantiophyta), and mosses (Bryophyta).
bulb
A thick storage organ, usually underground, consisting of a stem and leaf bases (the inner ones fleshy).
bulbel
A bulb arising from another bulb. See bulblet.

Bulbil of Crinum moorei

bulbil
A small, deciduous bulb or tuber formed in the axil of a leaf or pinna; a means of vegetative propagation.
bulblet
A bulb arising from another bulb; a bulbel.
bullate
1. Having a rounded or blister-like appearance; arched or vaulted.
2. (of a leaf) Having arched leaf tissue between each lateral vein, i.e. the veins appear depressed in the leaf surface.
burl
A deformation or knot in the branches or trunk of a tree, sometimes sought after in woodworking.
burr
1. A prickly fruit.
2. A rough or prickly propagule consisting of a seed or fruit and associated floral parts or bracts.
buttress root
A root growing from an above-ground stem or trunk, and providing support, e.g. commonly of Ficus macrophylla.
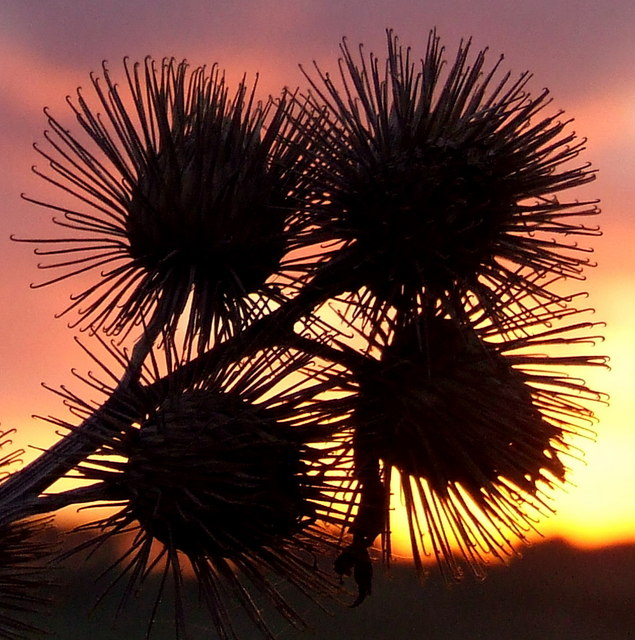
Burrs, fruits of Arctium species

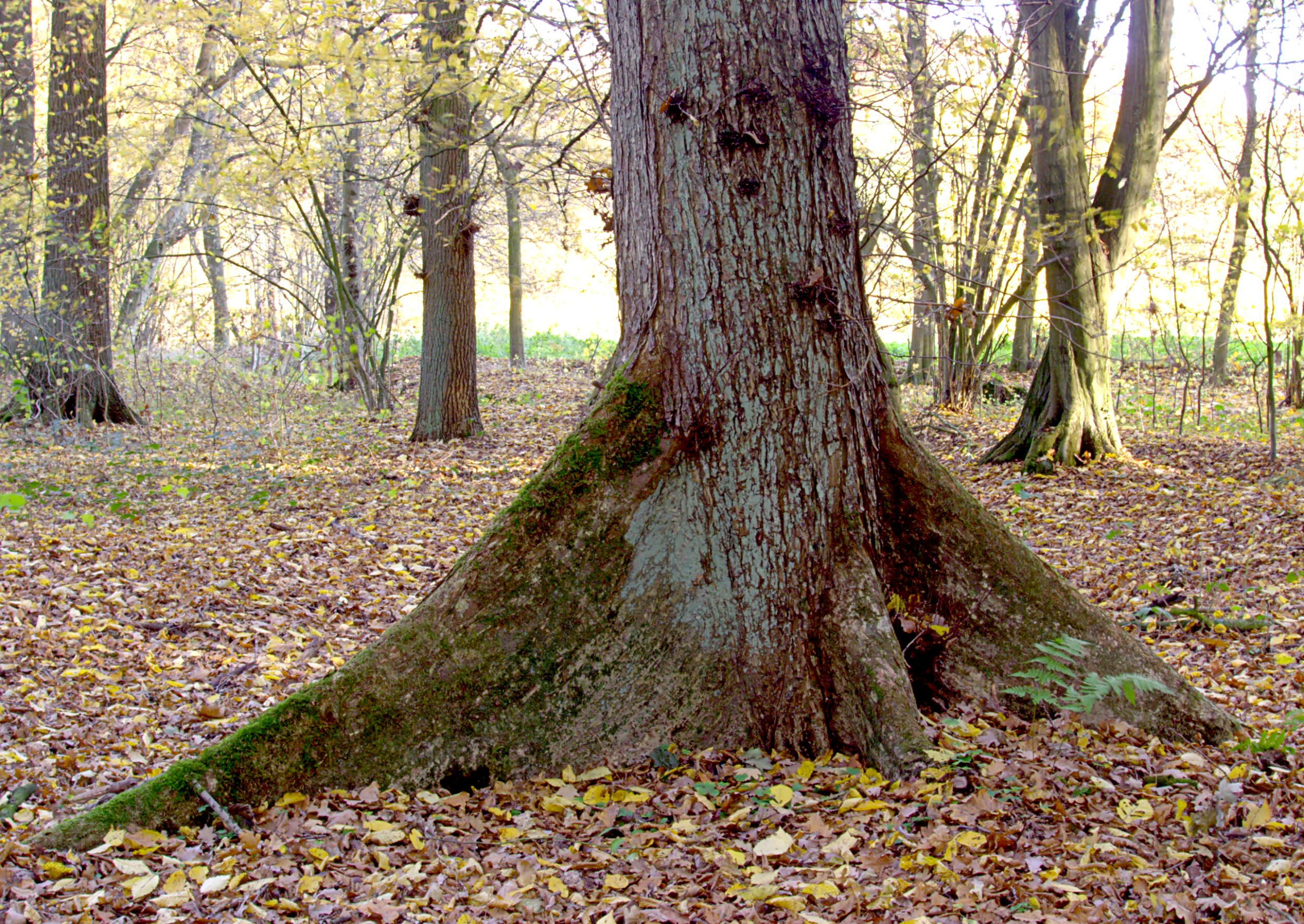
Buttress root of a mature elm

== C ==
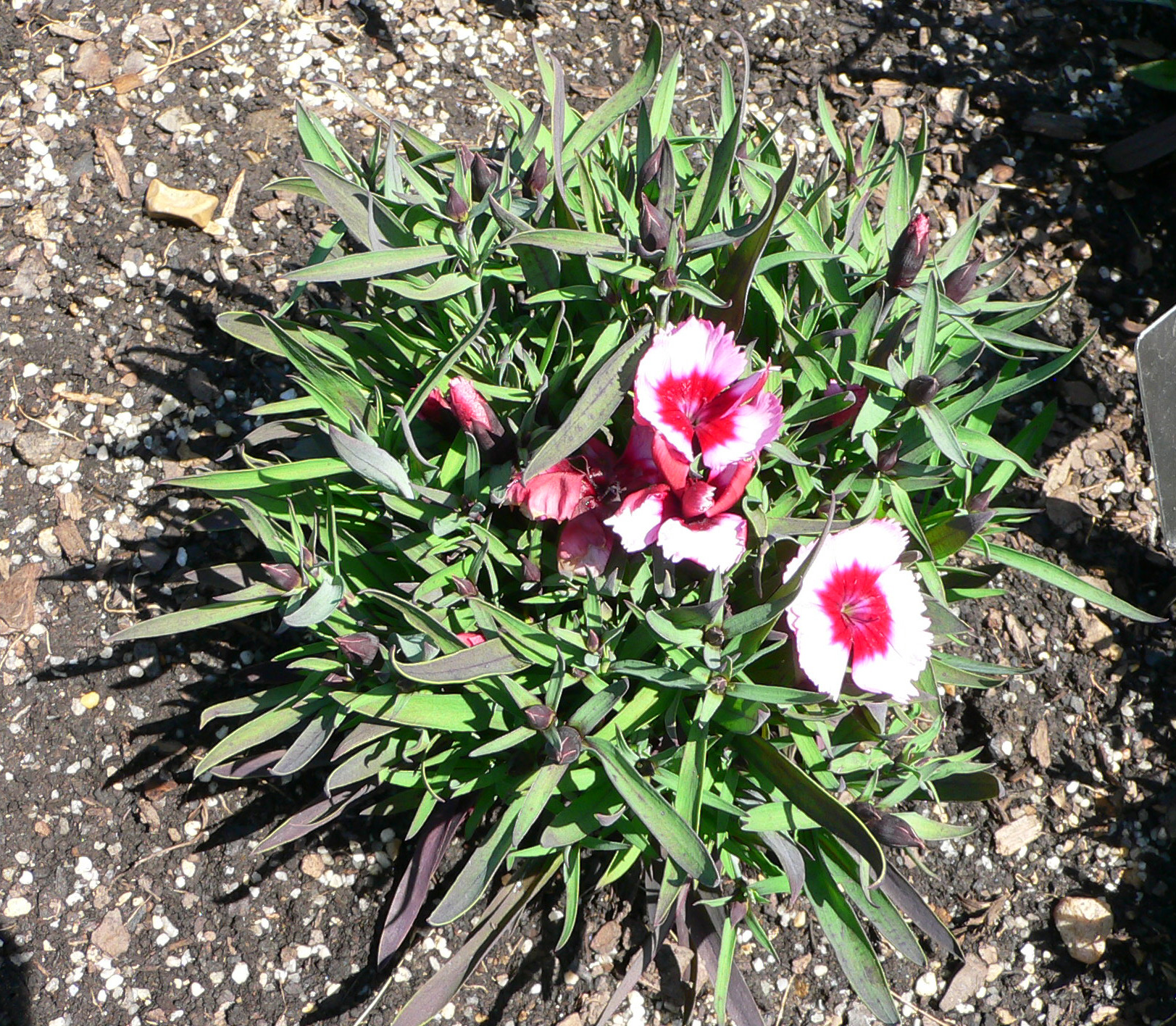
Dianthus chinensis has a caespitose growth habit.

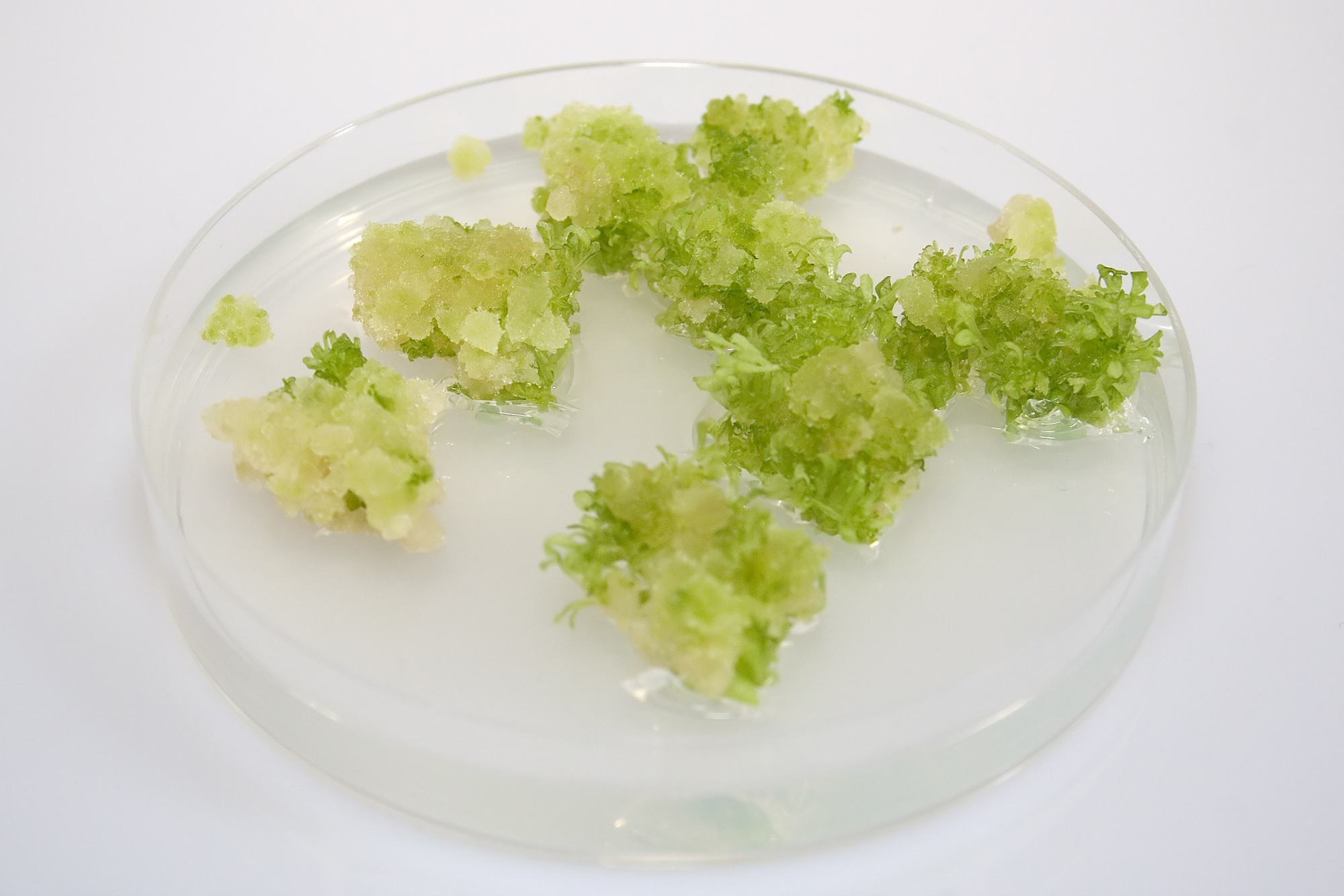
Callus tissue of Nicotiana tabacum growing on a nutrient medium in plant tissue culture

Structure of flower of an orchid in genus Praecoxanthus, with the callus labelled

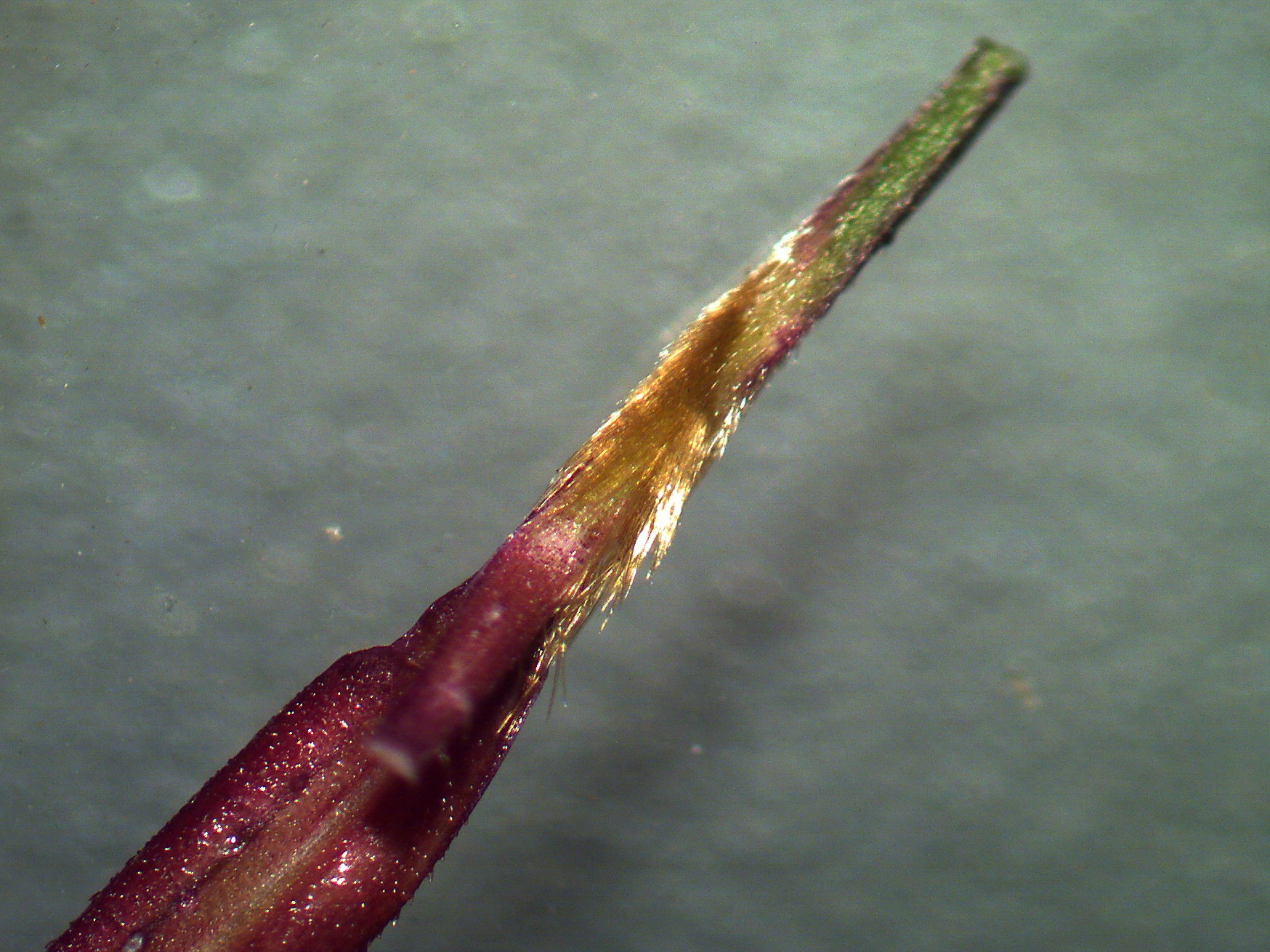
Bearded callus of a floret of the grass species Chrysopogon filipes

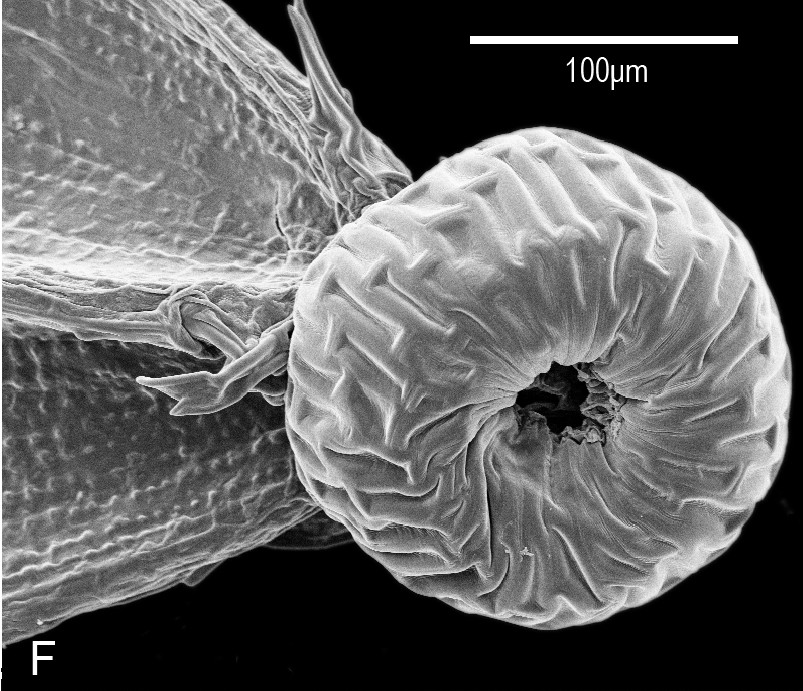
Scanning electron micrograph of the carpopodium at the base of the achene-like fruit of Zyzyura mayana, Asteraceae

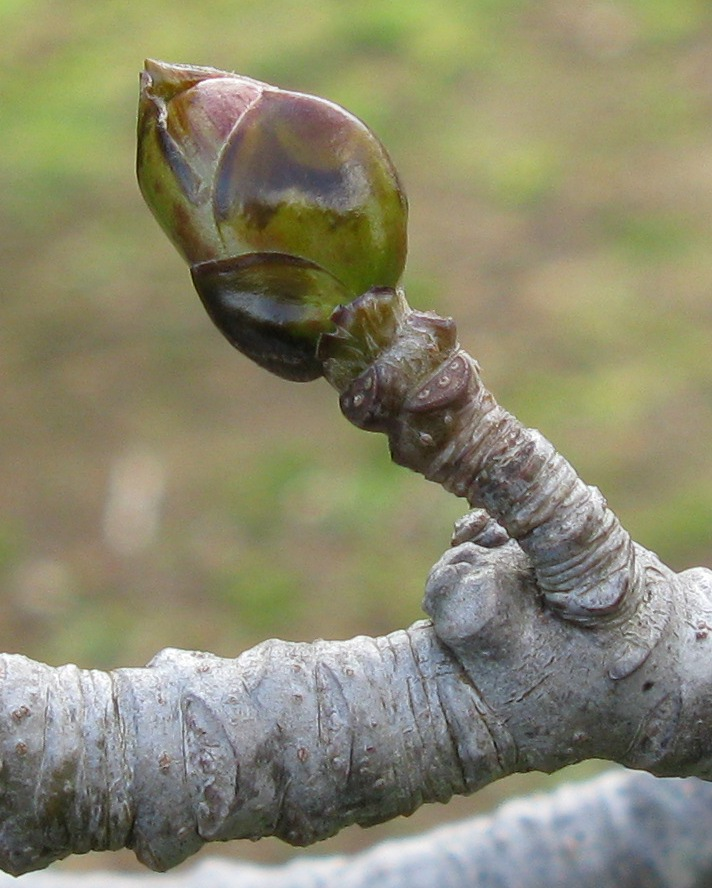
Dormant leaf buds of deciduous trees are commonly protected by imbricate cataphylls that are shed when the bud sprouts.

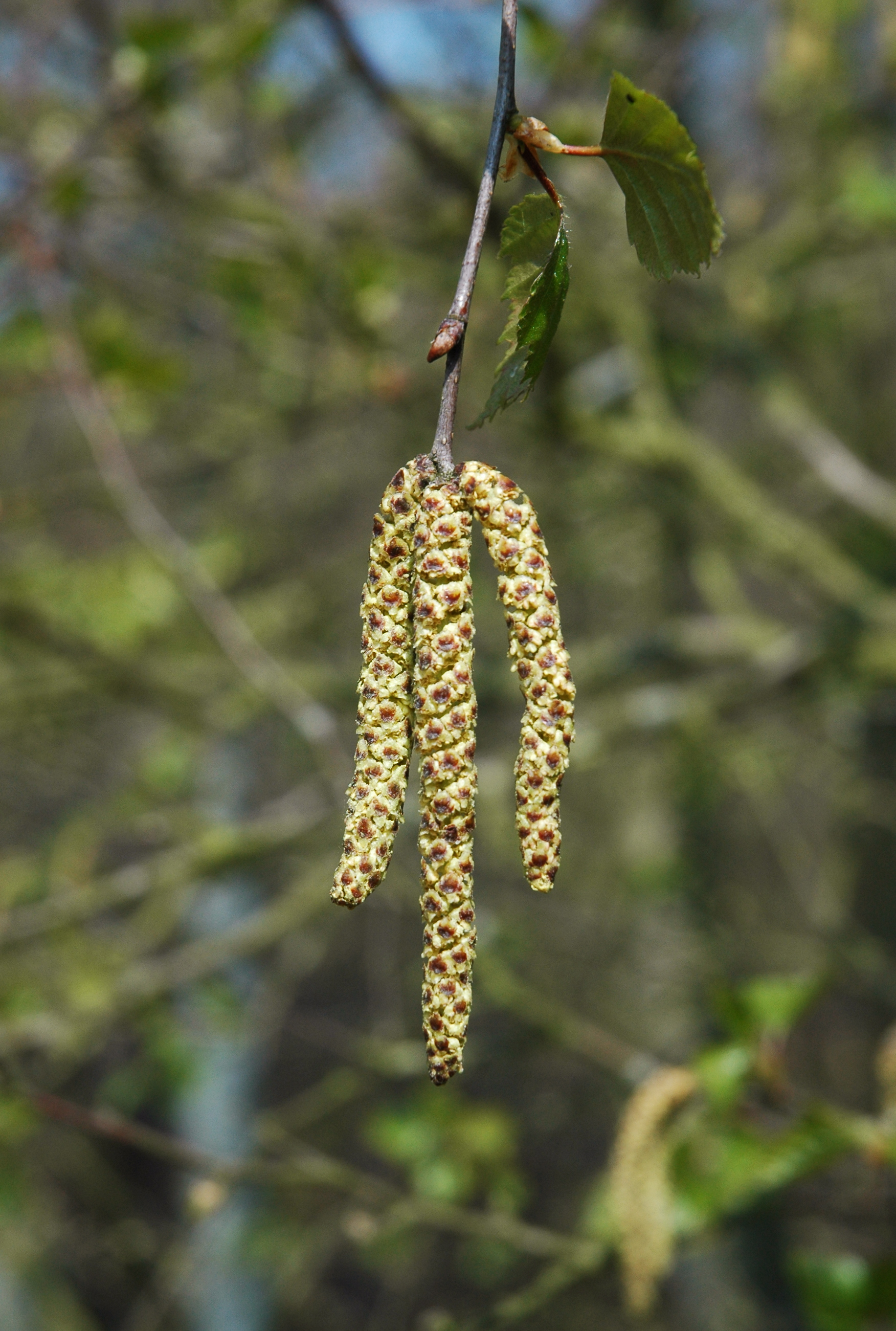
Male catkins of Betula pendula

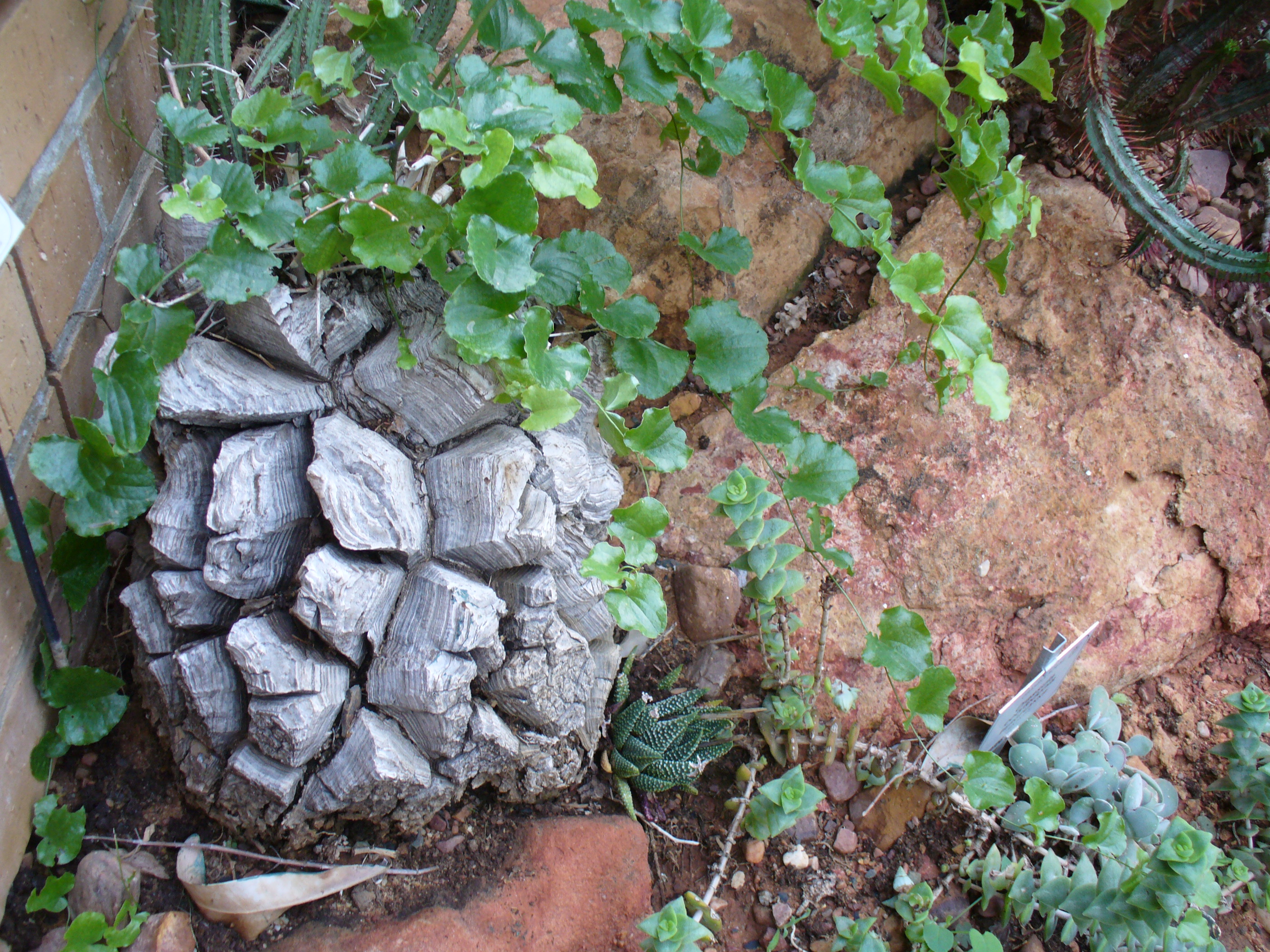
The caudex of Dioscorea elephantipes grows largely above the soil surface. Many species that form caudices grow them underground.

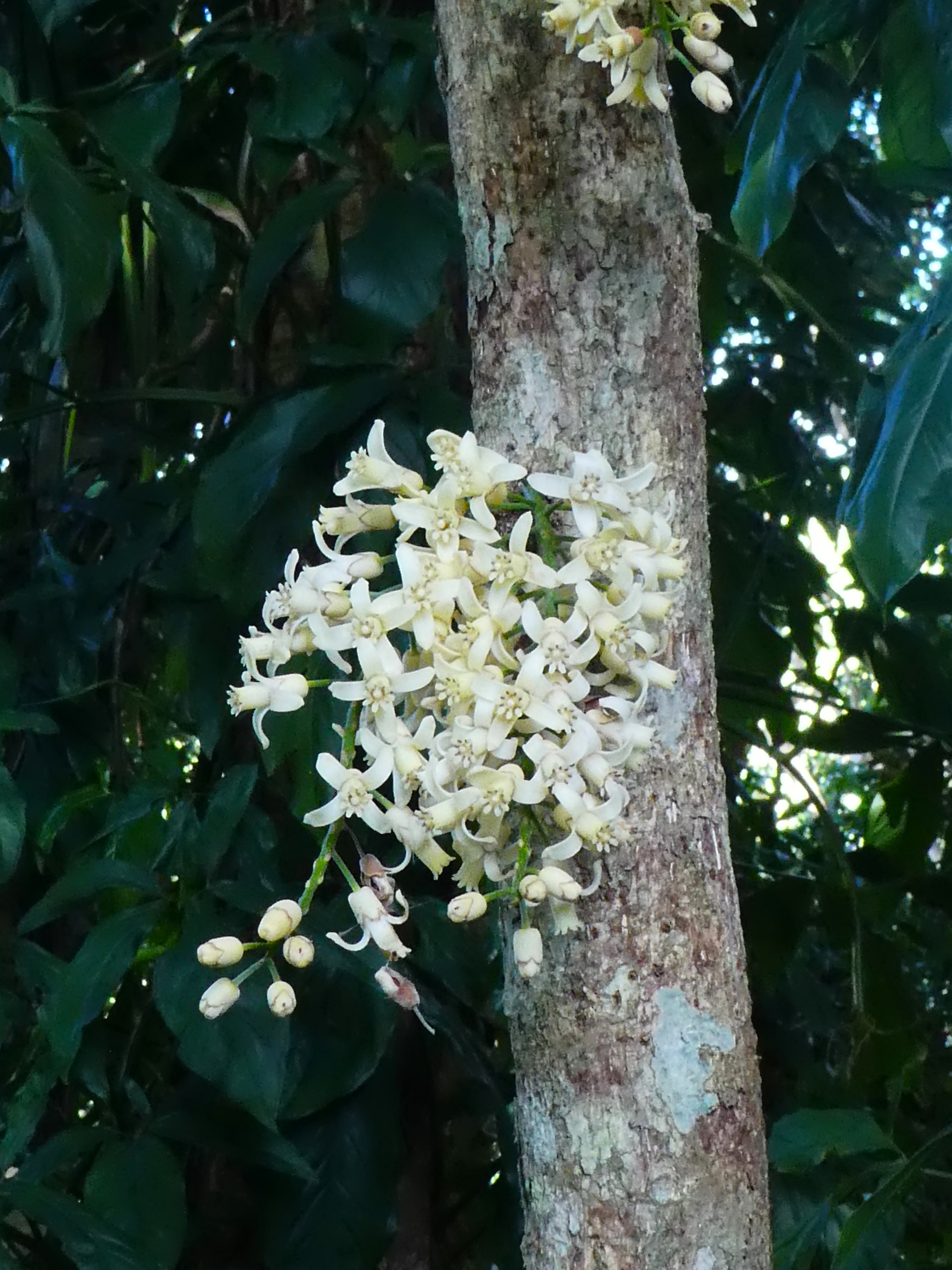
Flowers on the trunk of Epicharis parasitica, an example of cauliflory

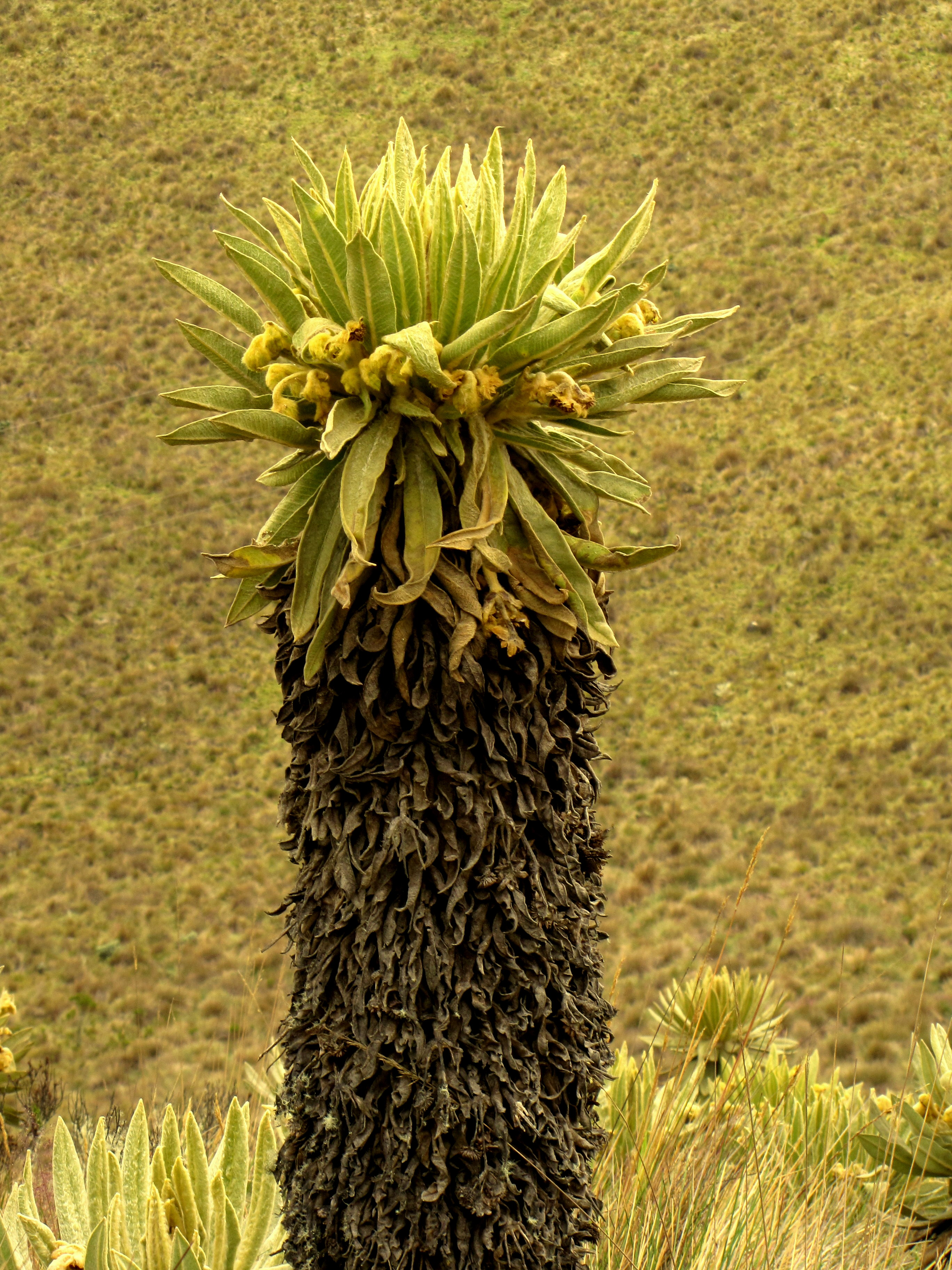
Some members of the Espeletia genus exhibit a growth habit that is caulirosulate.

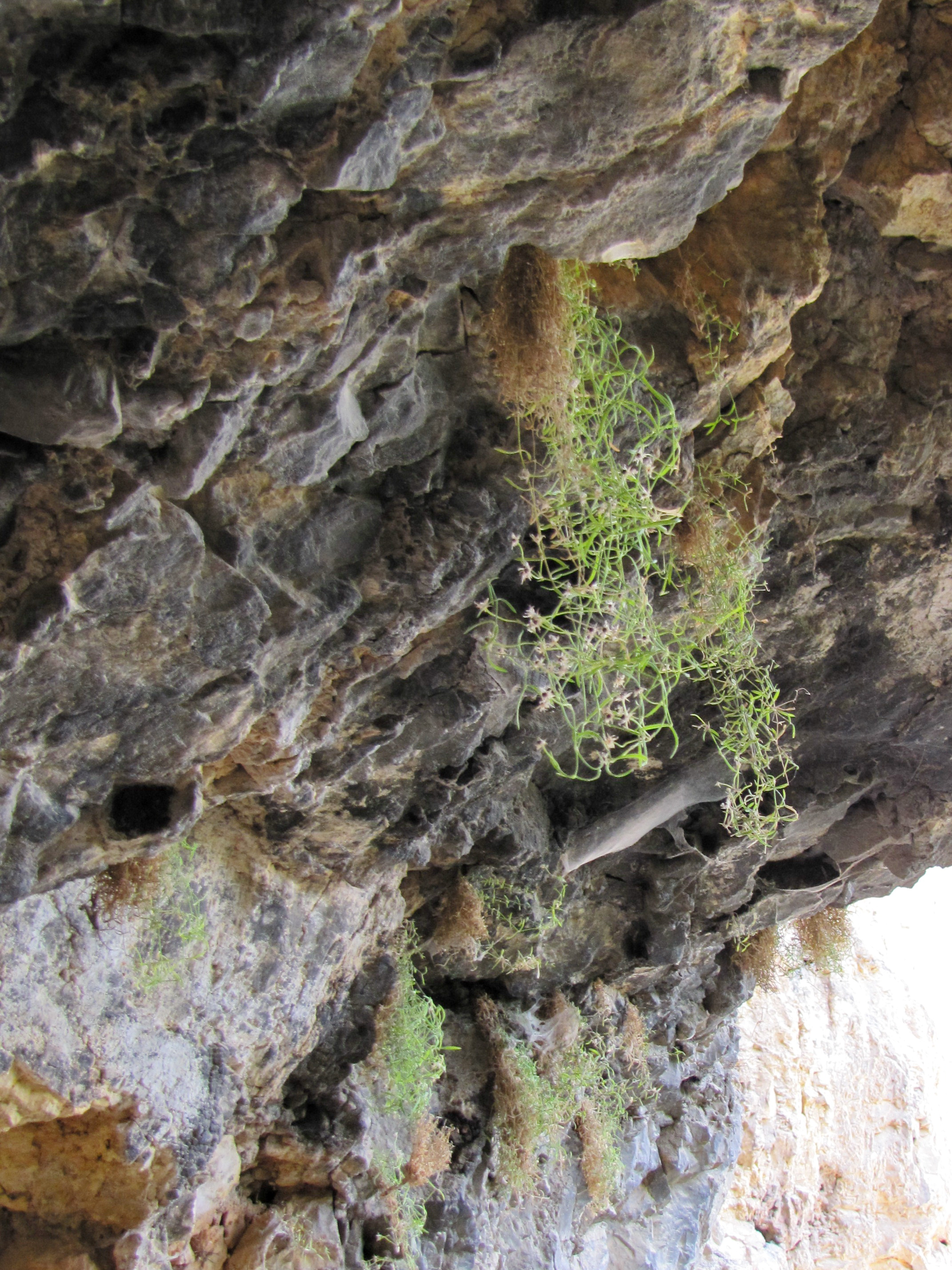
Moehringia growing as a chasmophyte on an overhanging cliff

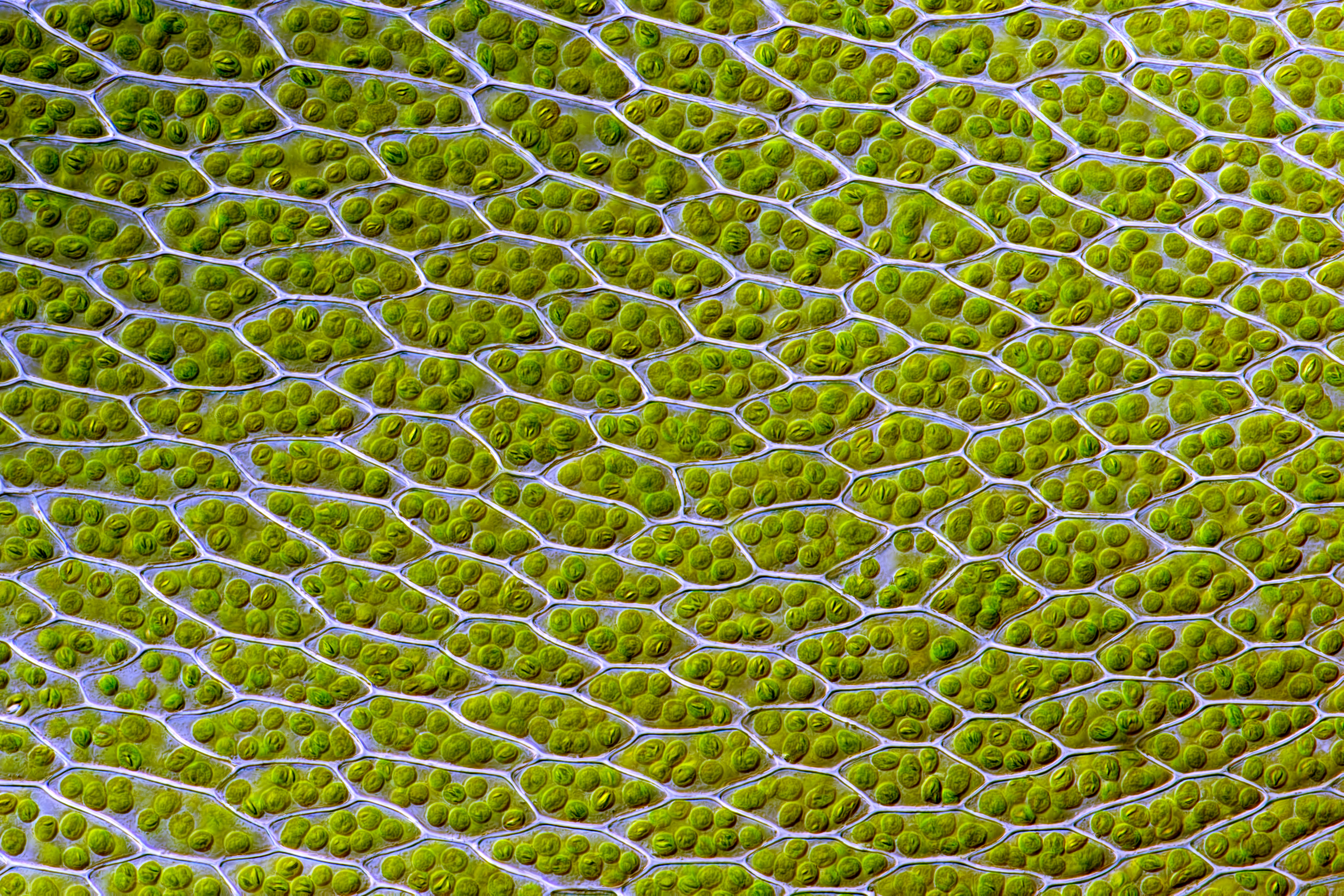
Chloroplasts within the cells of the leaves of the moss Bryum capillare

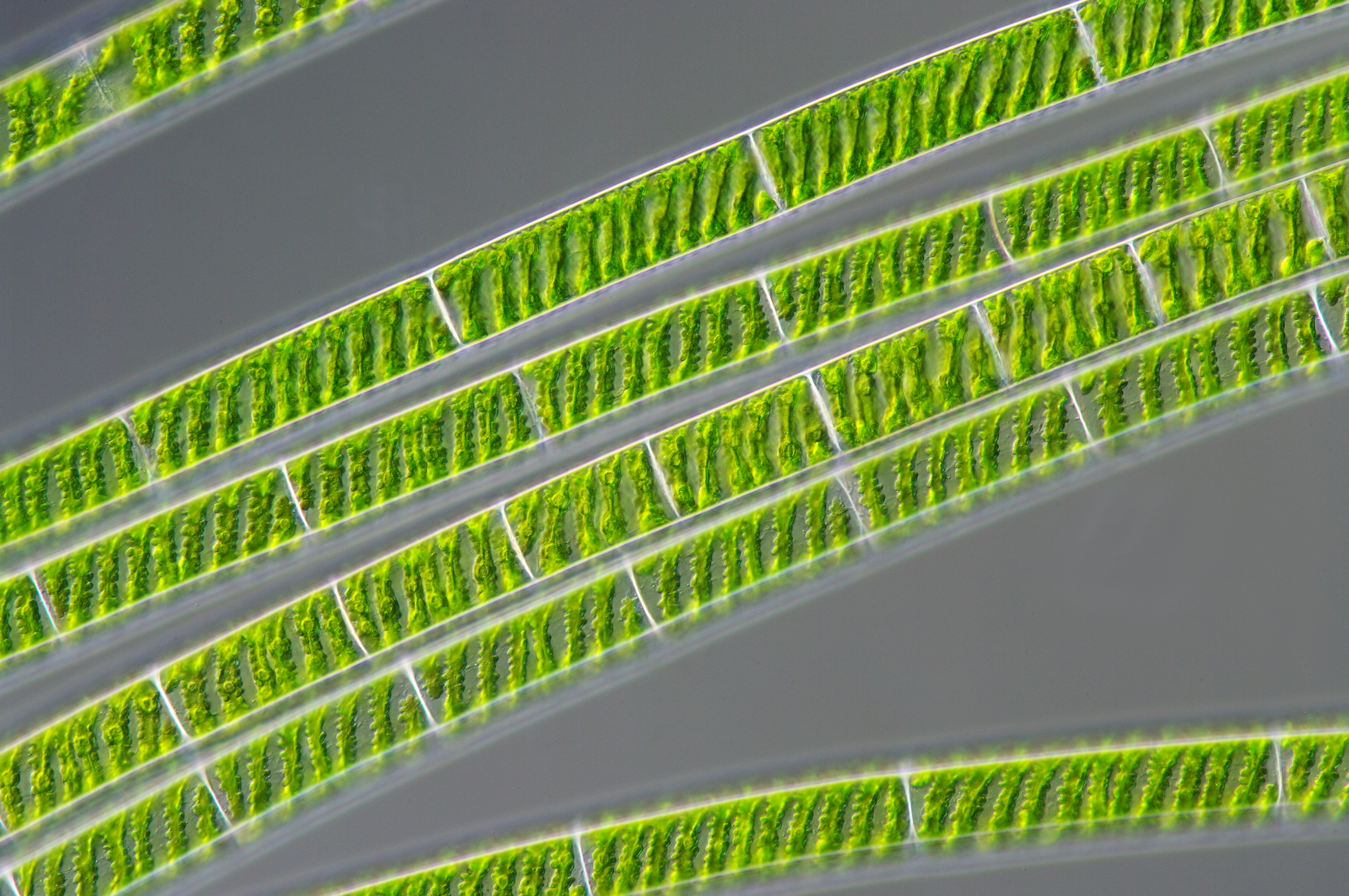
Not all chloroplasts are simple in shape. Chloroplasts of Spirogyra are helical within the tubular cells of their algal filaments.

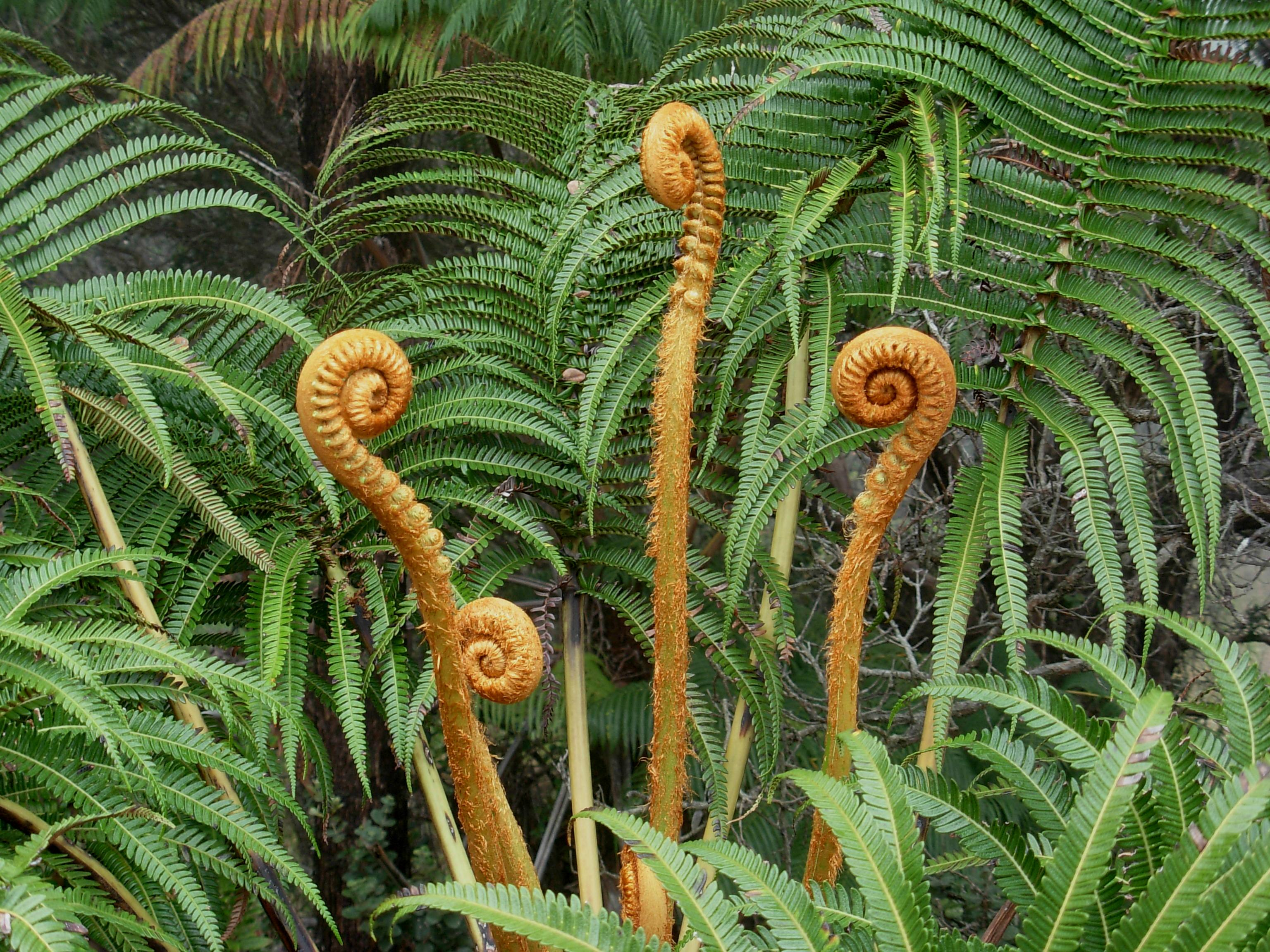
Circinate vernation of crosiers of the fern Sadleria cyatheoides

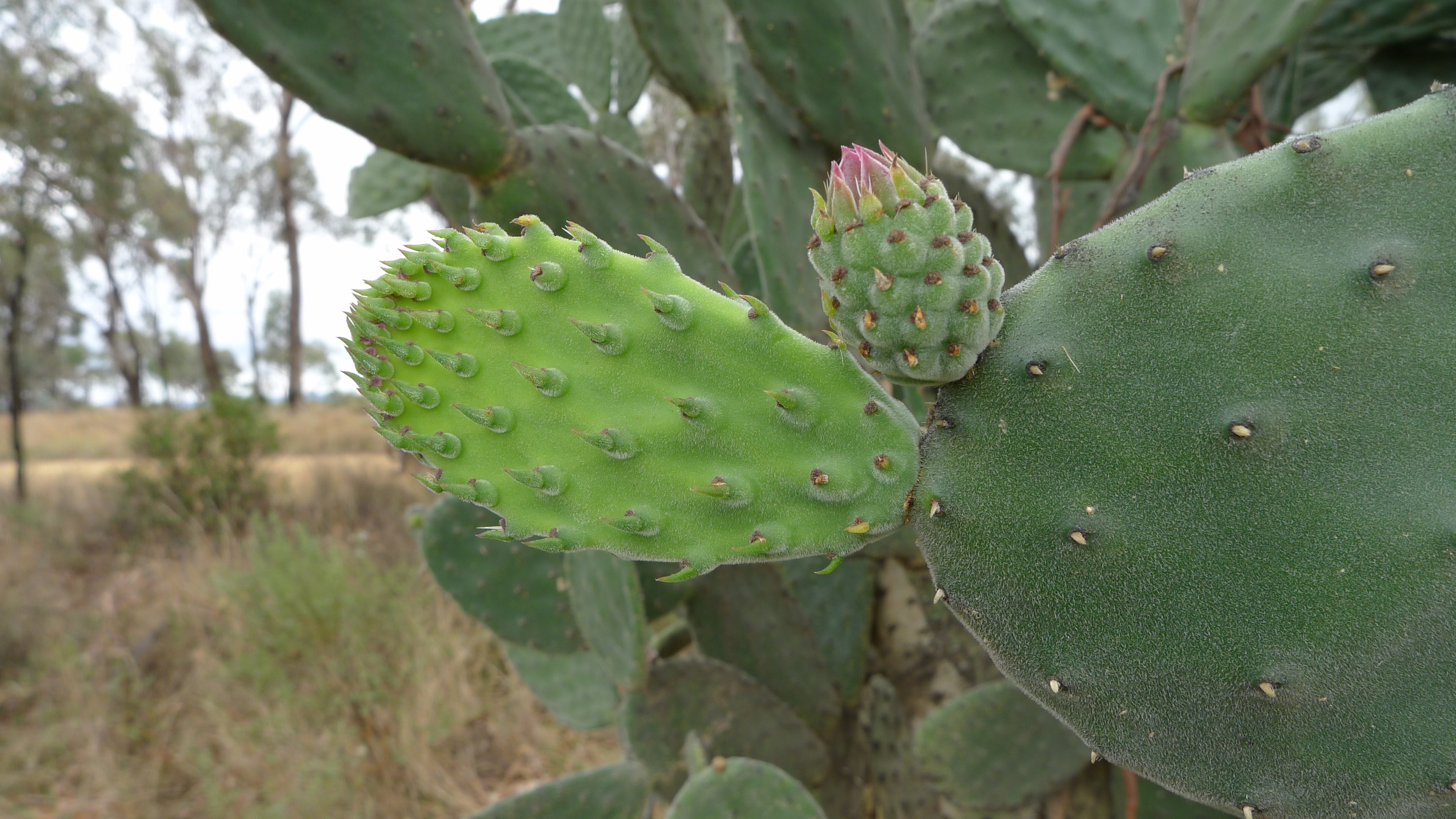
The so-called "fleshy leaves" of cacti, such as on this Opuntia tomentosa, are actually cladodes (branches). The true leaves are the spines growing on the cladodes, which on this young cladode are still fleshy.

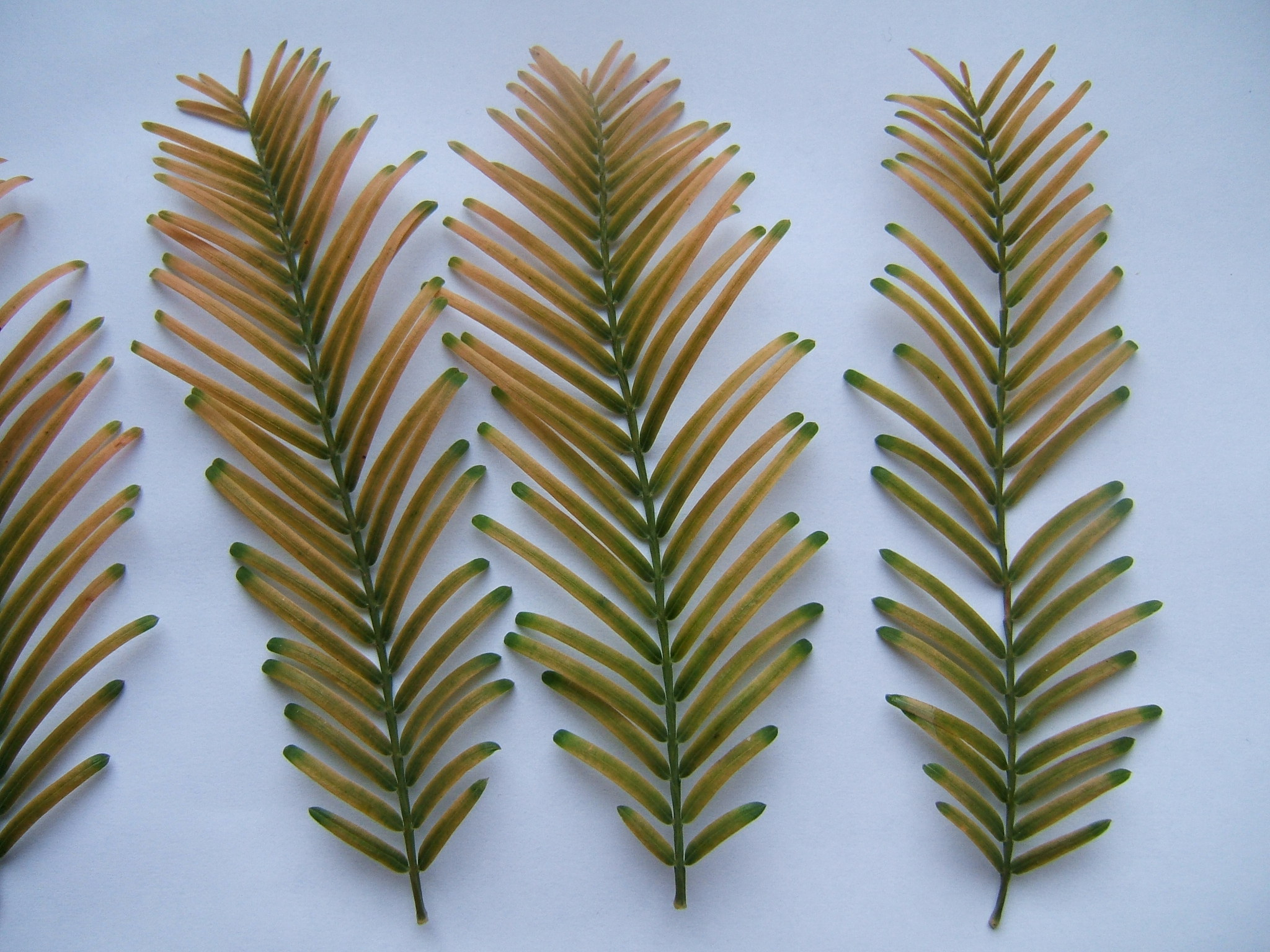
Shed autumn foliage of Metasequoia glyptostroboides, showing cladoptosis with whole shoots falling, not just individual leaves.

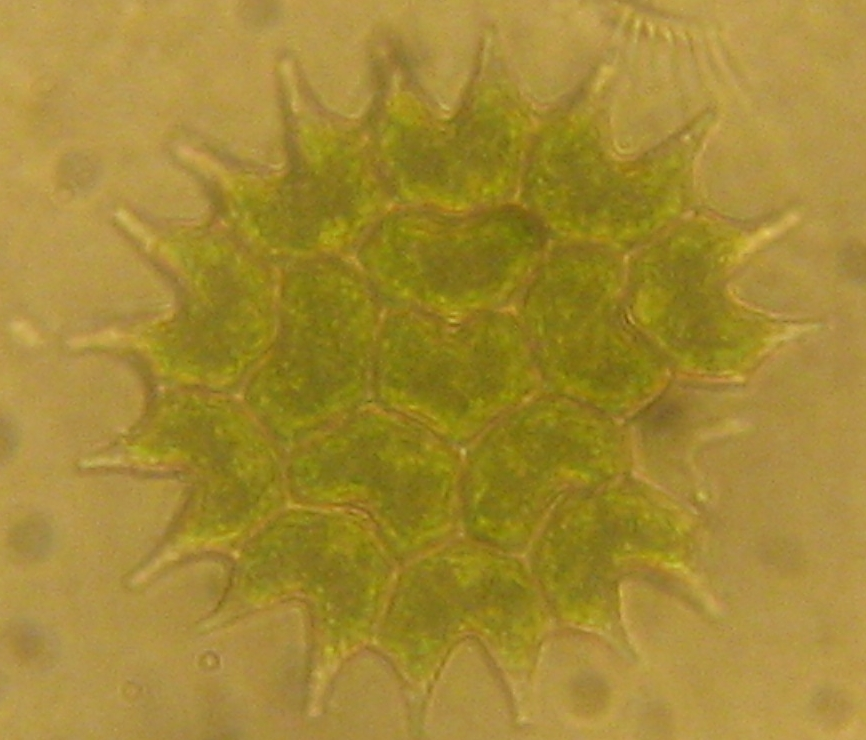
Colony of cells forming a coenobium, of an alga in the genus Pediastrum

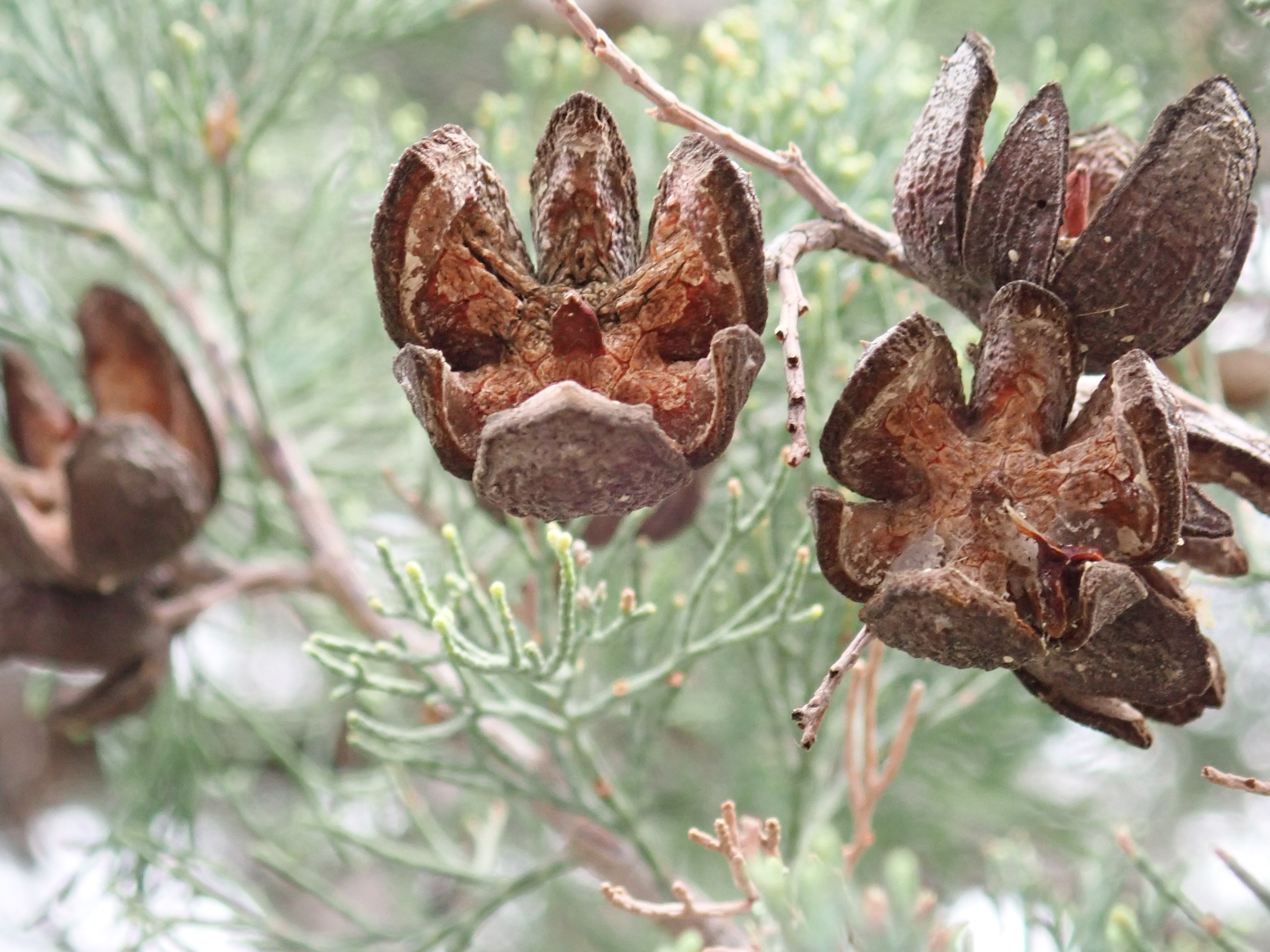
Seed cone of Callitris columellaris showing the columella in the center of the cone.

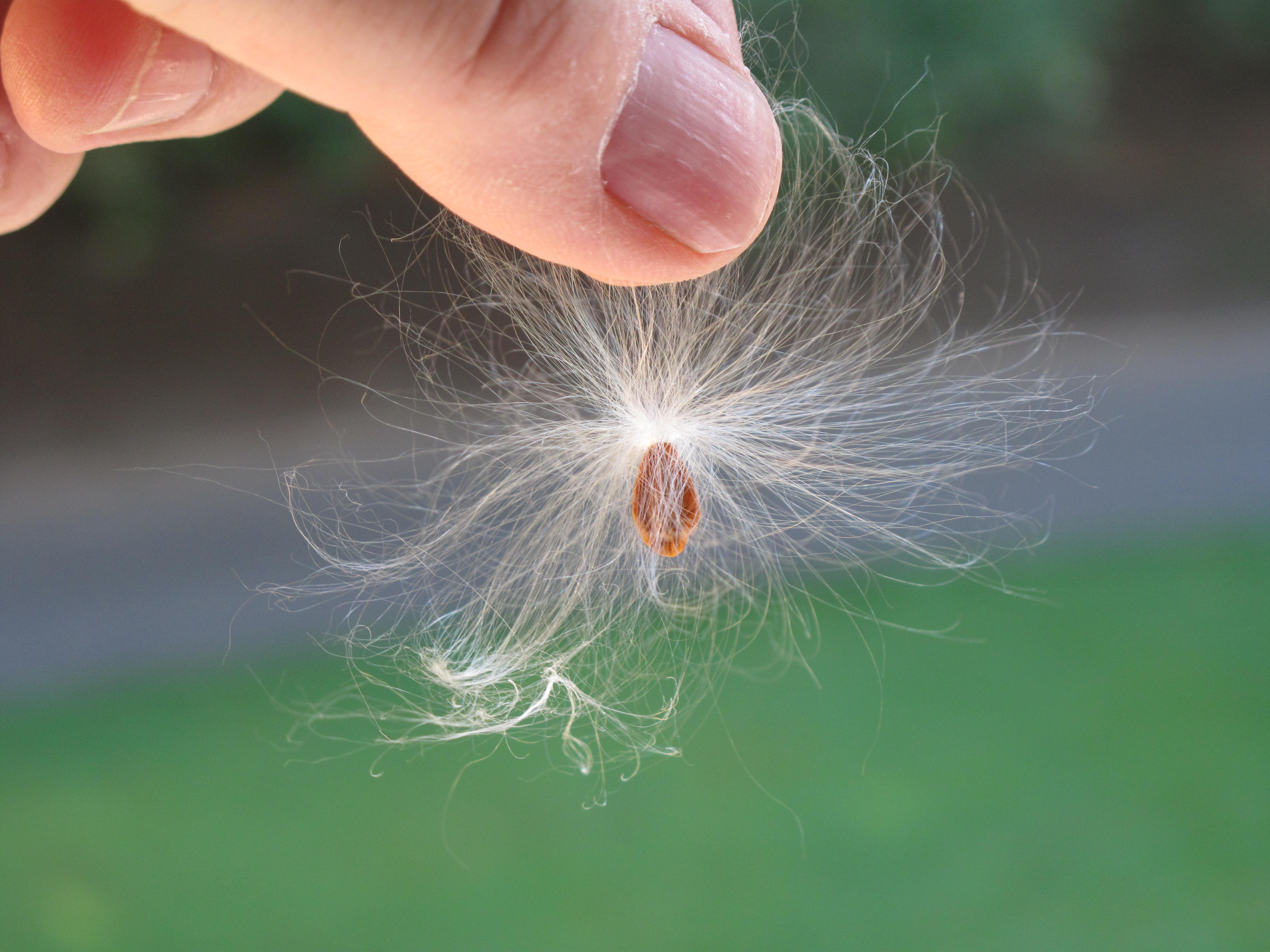
Asclepias syriaca seeds, showing the coma of hairs in its pappus

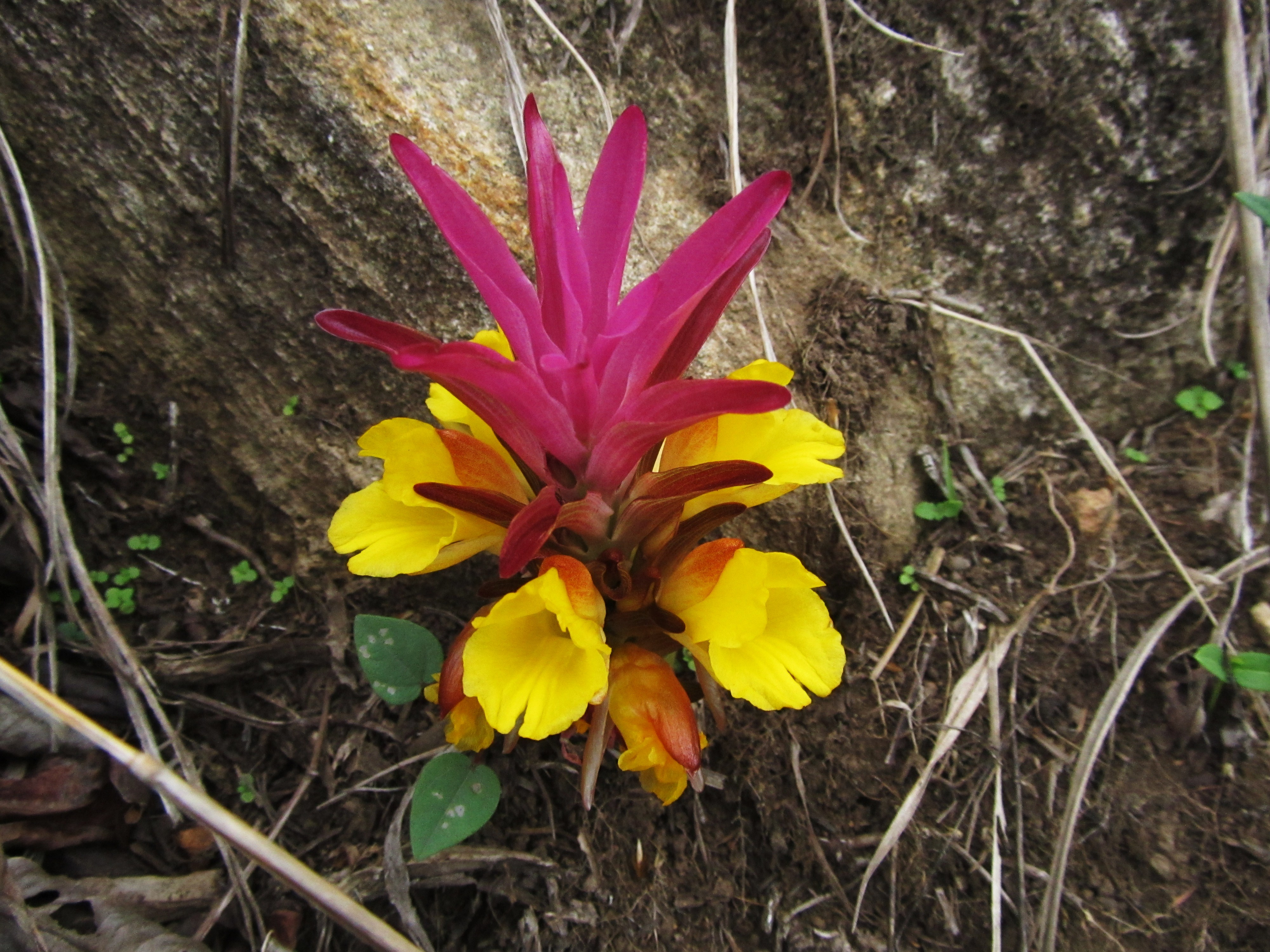
Curcuma pseudomontana with red coma bracts

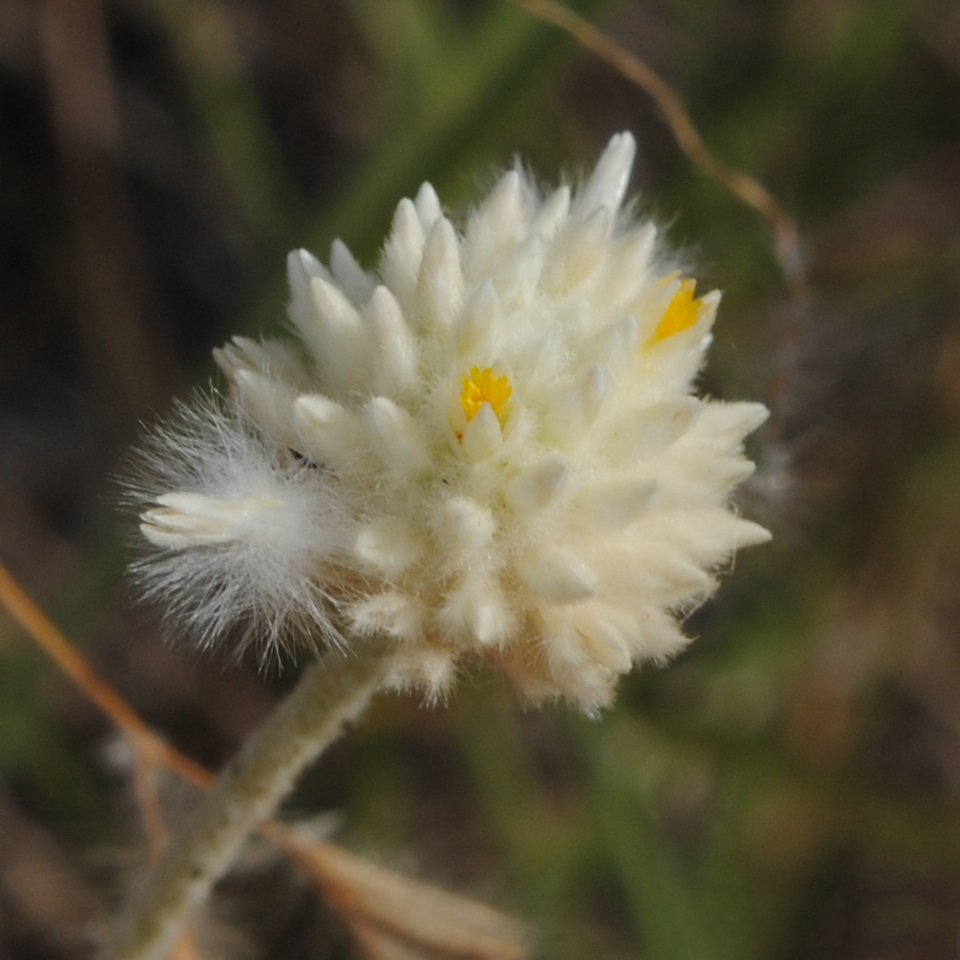
Pfaffia gnaphalioides flowers with basal coma hairs

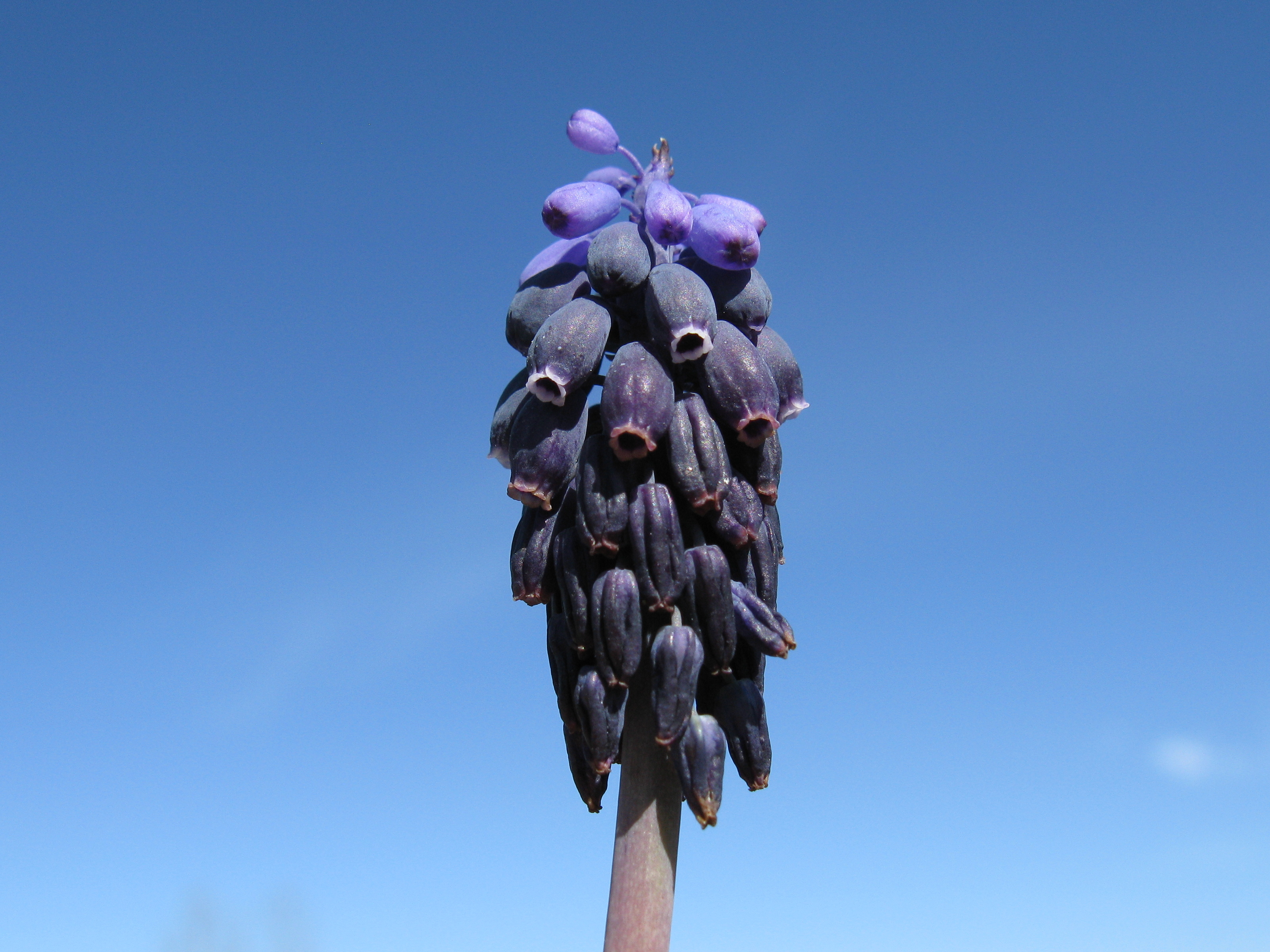
Coma atop Muscari armeniacum, bearing sterile flowers

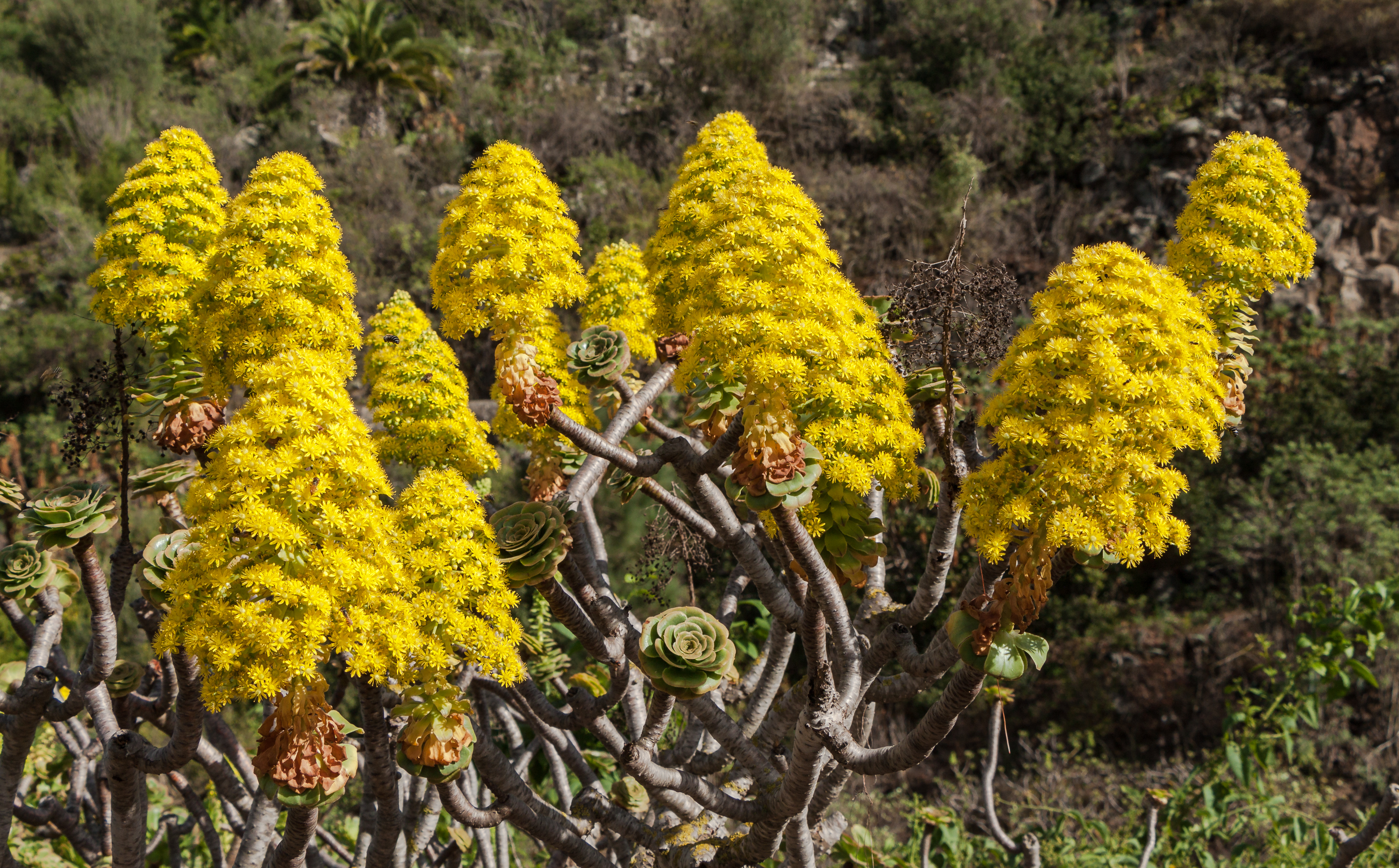
The conical compound inflorescence of Aeonium arboreum is a compound panicle composed of minor panicles, some of which are compound in their turn.

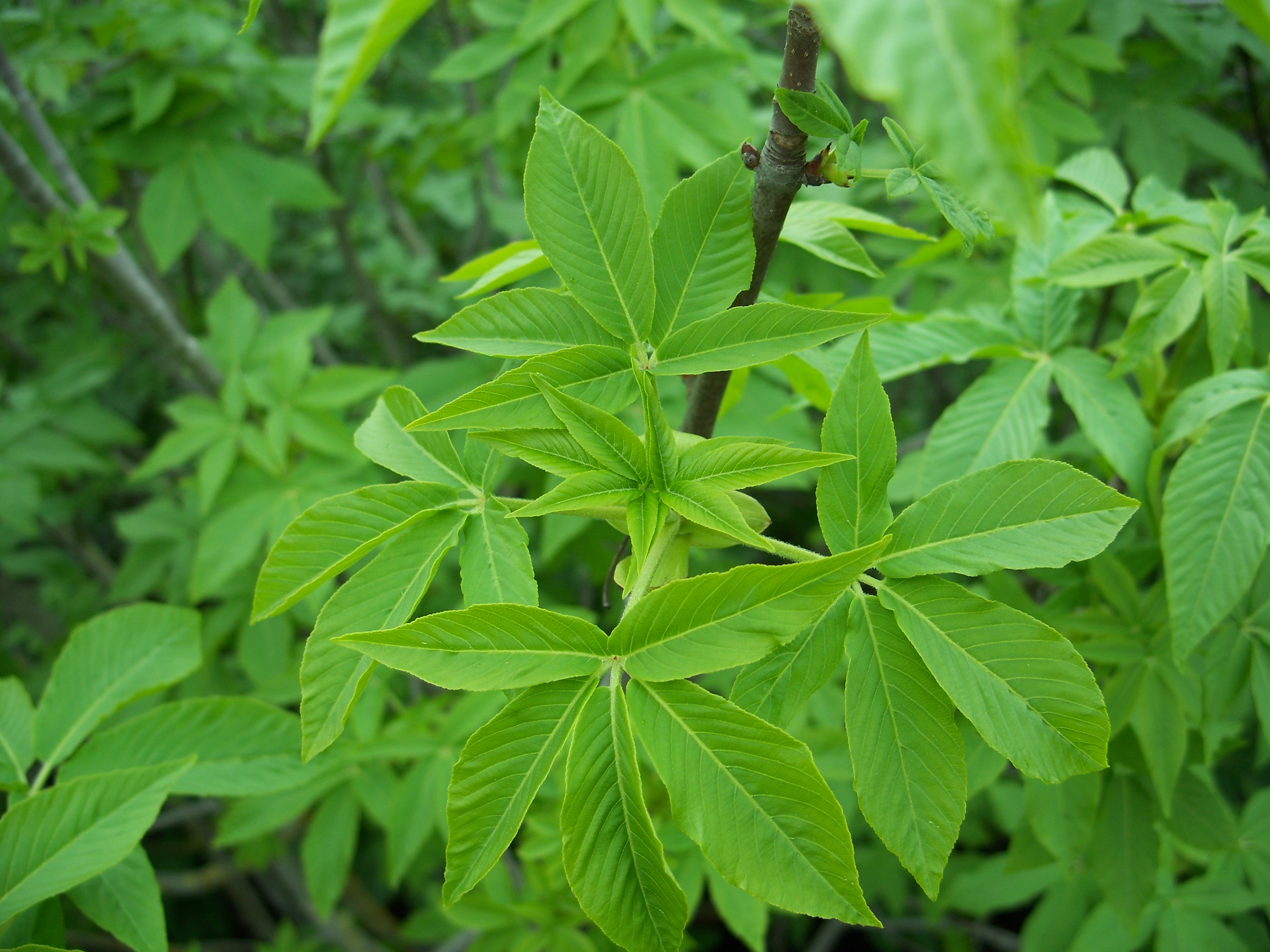
California buckeye (Aesculus californica) has a compound palmate leaf, the leaflets radiating from a central point.

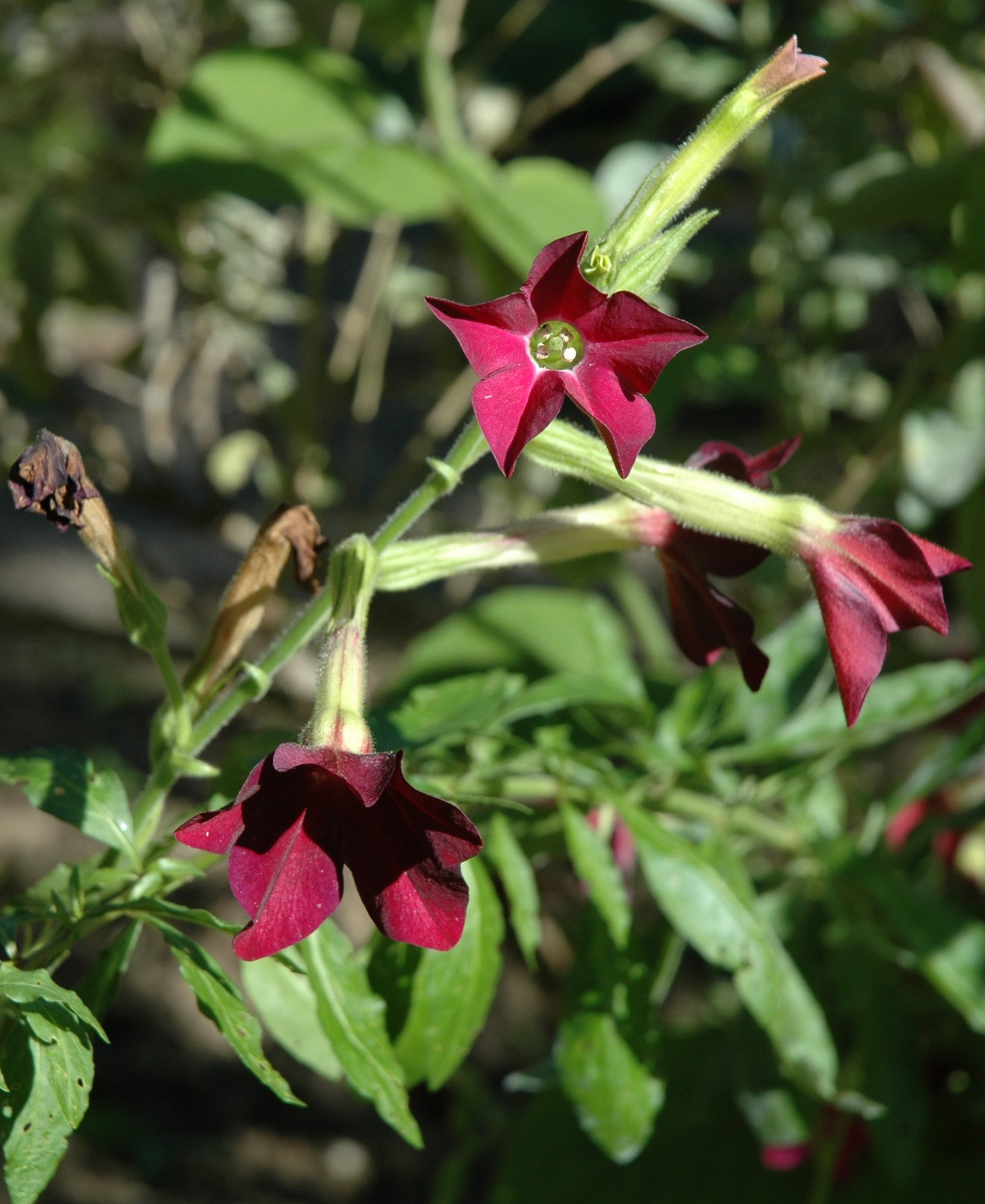
The lobes of the gamopetalous corolla of Nicotiana flowers are conduplicate in the bud.

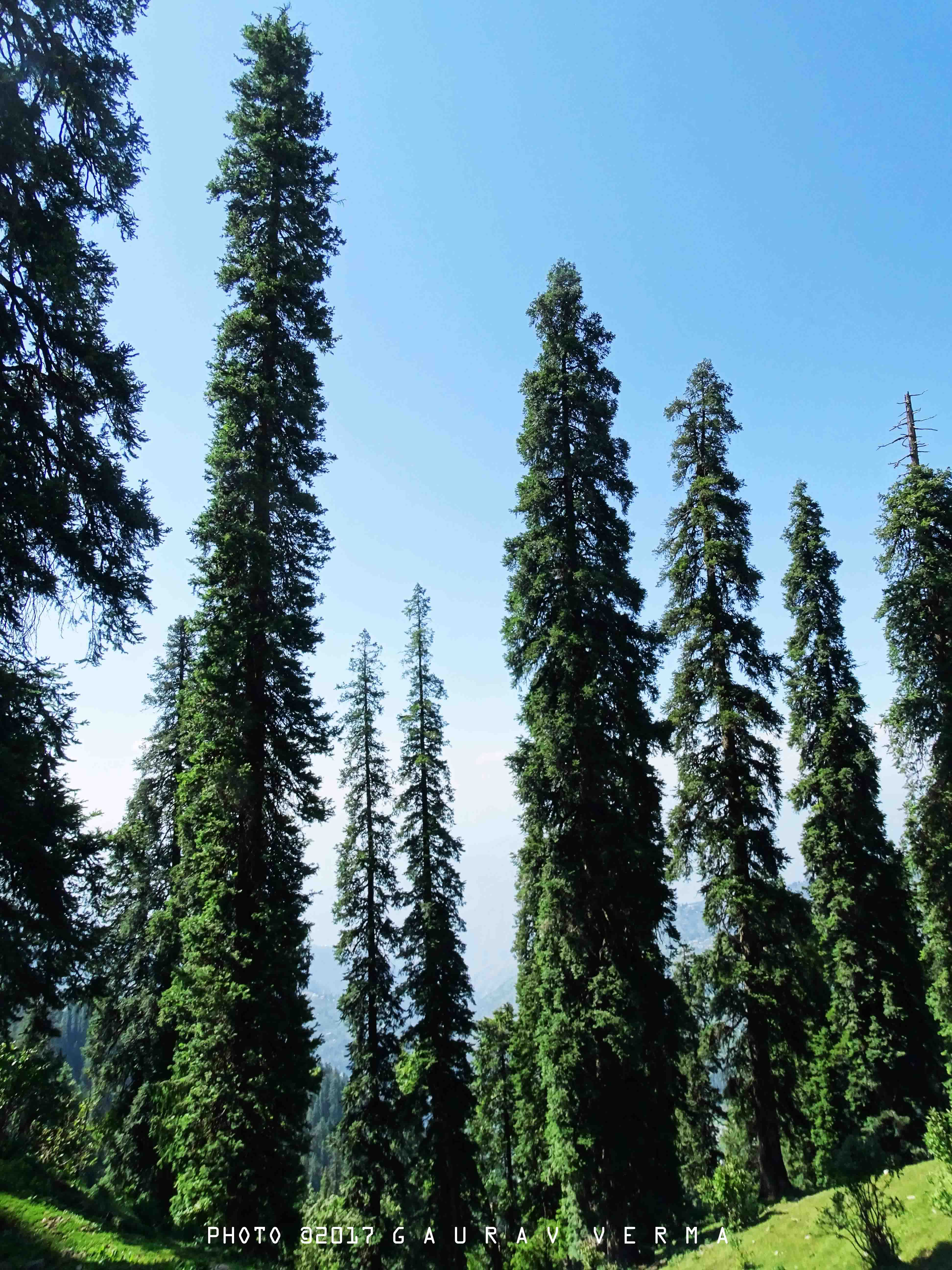
Trees that start as conical often become columnar with age (here, Abies pindrow).

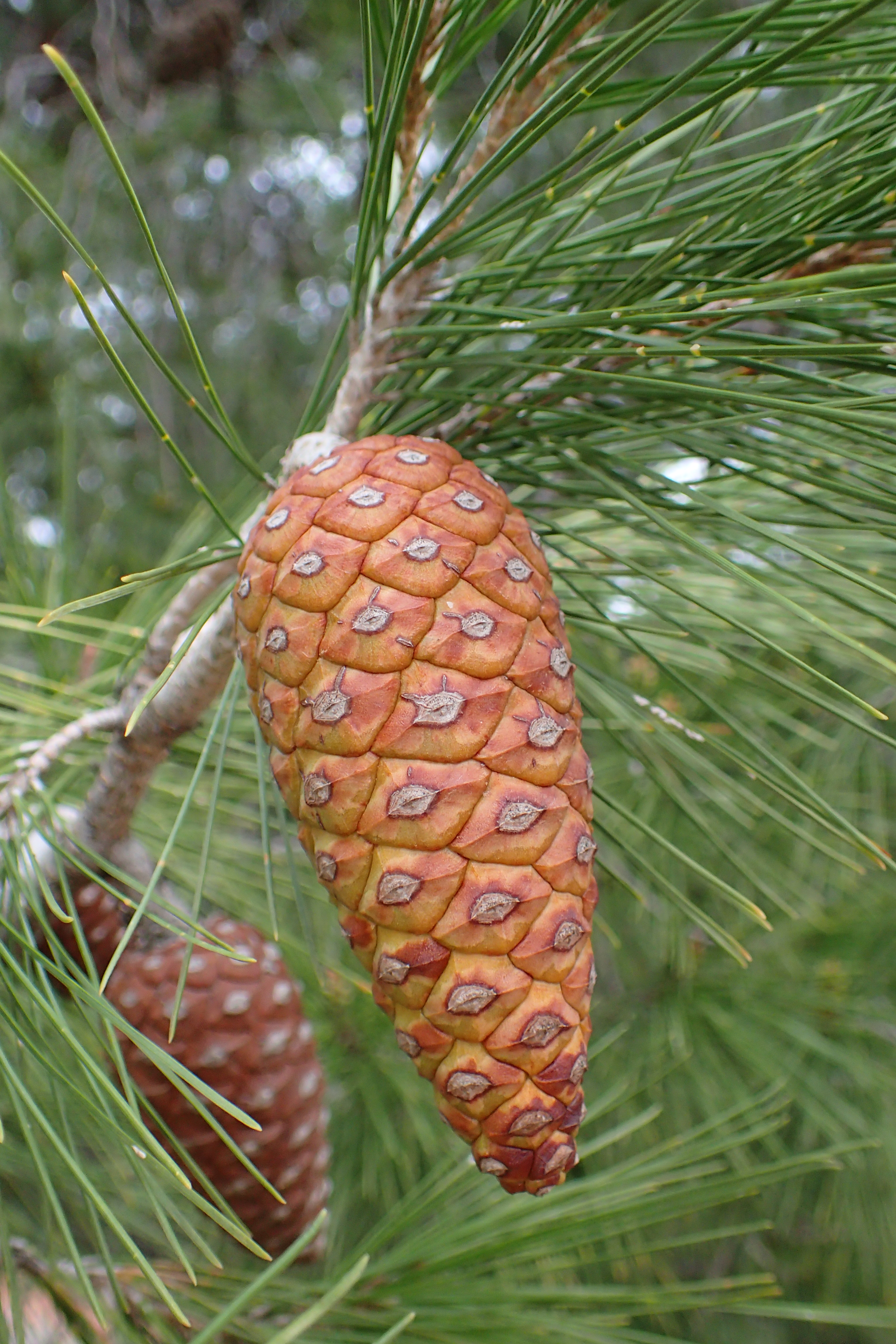
Pinus halepensis seed cone is one of the most archetypically cone-shaped conifer cones.

caducous
Falling off early, e.g. the sepals of poppies, which fall off when the petals begin to open. Compare persistent and fugacious.
caespitose
Tufted or turf-like, e.g. the growth form of some grasses and sedges.
calcarate
possessing a spur.
calcareous
A soil type or a lichen substrate rock type that is rich in or largely composed of calcium carbonate.
calceolate
Shaped like a slipper.
calcicole
A plant which thrives in calcareous soil. Also calciphile, calciphyte. Antonym: calcifuge.
callose
Hardened; thickened; callous.
callus

1. A protruding mass of tissue
2. Undifferentiated tissue growth formed in response to wounding; may be grown in vitro.
3. In orchids, fleshy outgrowths from the labellum which can be variously shaped from papillae to plates.
4. In grasses, a hardened extension from the base of a floret (formed from the rachilla joint and/or the base of the lemma), which may or may not elongate and is often covered in hairs or bristles.
calyciflorous
Having petals and stamens attached to the calyx.
calycophyll
Leaf-like structure formed from a sepal or calyx lobe which enlarges, usually many-fold, before or after anthesis, especially when most of the other sepals or calyx lobes retain their original size. More extreme than an accrescent calyx, calycophylls are found in Rubiaceae. Compare semaphyll and pterophyll.
calyculate
Having an epicalyx.
calyculus
1. A cup-shaped structure formed from bracts resembling an outer calyx.
2. In some Asteraceae, a circle of bracts below the involucre.
calyptra
A hood or lid. See operculum.
calyx

Collective term for the sepals of one flower; the outer whorl of a flower, usually green. Compare corolla.
calyx tube
A tube formed by the fusion of the sepals (calyx), at least at the base.
cambium
Tissue layer that provides partially undifferentiated cells for plant growth.
campanulate
Bell-shaped.
camptodromous
Pinnate venation in which the secondary veins curve toward the margins, in some cases becoming nearly parallel with them, and not reconnecting with other veins to form loops.
campylotropous
When the ovule is oriented transversely (i.e. with its axis at right angles to its stalk) and with a curved embryo sac. Compare amphitropus, anatropous, and orthotropous.
canaliculate
Channelled; having a longitudinal groove.
canescent
Approaching white in color, as in a leaf covered with white down or wool.
canopy
Branches and foliage of a tree; the crown. Also refers to the protective upper layer of a forest. Compare trunk.
capillary
1. Tube, pore, or passage with a narrow, internal cross-section.
2. Slender; hair-like.
capitate
1. (of an inflorescence) Having a knob-like head, with the flowers unstalked and aggregated into a dense cluster.
2. (of a stigma) Like the head of a pin.
capitulum
Dense cluster of sessile or subsessile flowers or florets, e.g. a flower head in the daisy family Asteraceae. See pseudanthium.
capsule
Dry fruit formed from two or more united carpels and dehiscing when ripe (usually by splitting into pieces or opening at summit by teeth or pores).
carduoid
In Asteraceae, having a style with a ring of sweeping hairs borne on the shaft of the style below the style branches.
carina
See keel.
carinal canal
Longitudinal cavity in the stems of Equisetum and extinct Equisetopsida, coinciding with a ridge in the stem surface.
carneous
Flesh-colored, especially as applied to some flowers.
carnose, carnous
Fleshy or pulpy in texture, especially as applied to some tissues or organs. Contrast coriaceous and corneous.
Caropodium
Genus of flowering plants in the family Apiaceae. Native range: Turkey to Iran. Not to be confused with Carpopodium
carpel
The basic female reproductive organ in angiosperms, either consisting of a single sporophyll or a single locule of a compound ovary, with a style and a stigma. The gynoecium is the collective term for all of the carpels of a single flower.
carpellary
Referring to carpels or to associated structures or outgrowths of carpels, for example staminodes attached to carpels in Nymphaeaceae, were frequently referred to as carpellary attachments. The current and past usage of the terms "carpellary attachments", paracarpels, and staminodes is confused and varies among authors.
carpopodium
On achenes (Cypselae), an elongation of the base of the gynoecium which looks distinct; the abscission zone, where the achene is separated from the receptacle.
2. Genus Carpopodium in the family Brassicaceae; not to be confused with Caropodium.
cartilaginous
Hard and tough; gristly. Compare corneous and coriaceous.
caruncle
A small piece of flesh-like tissue, typically lumpy or warty, growing on the testa near the hilum. Contrast aril.
caryopsis
A dry, indehiscent, one-seeded fruit in which the seed coat is closely fused to the fruit wall, e.g. in most grasses.
Casparian strip
A continuous band of suberin in the radial primary cell walls of the endodermis in vascular plant stems and roots that forms a permeability barrier to the passive diffusion of external water and solutes into the vascular tissue.
cassideous
Hood-, helmet- or bonnet-shaped; generally referring to floral anatomy, e.g. in the flowers of Aconitum, Satyrium, etc.
castaneous
Chestnut-colored, reddish-brown.
casual alien
An exotic plant that appears with no apparent human assistance but does not develop a sustained population(s), or one that persists only by repeated new introductions. Compare alien.
cataphyll
Any plant structure which is morphologically a leaf but which has at most an incidental or transient photosynthetic function. They are either shed when their main function has been completed, or are incorporated into structures where, when dead, they serve a protective or supportive purpose.
catenulate
In the shape of a chain; formed of parts or cells connected as if chained together, e.g. some diatoms, algae, and cyanobacteria such as Anabaena. See also concatenate.
catkin
A spike, usually pendulous, in which the mostly small flowers are unisexual and without a conspicuous perianth, e.g. in willows, poplars, oaks, and casuarinas. The individual flowers often have scaly bracts and are generally wind-pollinated. Catkins are usually shed as a unit.
caudate
Having a narrow, tail-like appendage or tip, e.g. a drip tip. Contrast acuminate, cuspidate, and mucronate.
caudex

The stem of a plant, especially a woody one; also used to mean a rootstock, or particularly a basal stem structure or storage organ from which new growth arises. Compare lignotuber.
caudiciform
Stem-like or caudex-like; sometimes used to mean "pachycaul", meaning "thick-stemmed".
caudicle
diminutive of caudex. Meaning is context-dependent, usually referring to stem-like support of tiny items such as the pollinium of an orchid. Often used interchangeably with stipe
caulescent
possessing a well-developed stem above ground, similar to cauline. Antonym: acaulescent (lacking an apparent stem).
cauliflory

Having flowers or fruits growing directly from a tree's trunk.
cauline
Borne on an aerial stem or caulis, as with leaves, flowers, or fruits (when applied to the latter two organs, usually referring to older stems.
caulirosulate
Borne at the end of the stem or caulis, as with leaves or bracts.
cell
1. The basic, microscopic unit of plant structure, generally consisting of compartments in a viscous fluid surrounded by a cell wall.
2. A cavity of an anther or ovary.
cenanthous
(of a perianth) Lacking both stamens and pistil, i.e. a flower with neither androecium nor gynoecium.
centrifixed
Of a two-branched organ attached by its center, e.g. a hair or anther.
ceraceous
Having a waxy appearance, color, or texture, e.g. flowers of many species of Ceropegia, and the waxy fruit of some species of Myrica.
cernuous
Nodding, falling headlong or face down; inclined, stooping, or bowing forward. Applied to many species with a nodding, stooping habit, such as many Narcissus and Dierama species. Many plant species bear the specific epithet "cernua".
cespitose
An alternative spelling of caespitose, meaning tufted or turf-like, e.g. the growth form of some grasses.
chamber
A cavity of an ovary.
channelled
Sunken below the surface, resulting in a rounded channel.
chartaceous
Having a papery texture.
chasmogamous
Of flowers that are pollinated when the perianth is open. Compare cleistogamous.
chasmophyte
A plant adapted to growing in crevices or hollows, such as in cliff faces. Compare cremnophyte.
chimera
An individual composed of two or more genetically distinct tissues, most commonly as a result of a graft and sometimes by mutations that occur during cell division or cellular transfers during seed development.
chiropterophilous
Pollinated by bats.
chlorophyll
Any of a variety of different chemical pigments in chloroplasts that are essential for photosynthesis.
chloroplast
An organelle present in plant cells which contains chlorophyll.
chlorosis
An abnormal lack or paleness of color in a normally green organ.
cilia

Very small hairs or hair-like protrusions more or less confined to the margins of an organ, as with eyelashes; in motile cells, minute, hair-like protrusions which aid motility.
cinereous
Ash-colored, grayish, usually because of a covering of short hairs; somewhat darker than canescent.
circinate
Spirally coiled with the tip innermost, e.g. circinate vernation of the developing fronds of most ferns.
cirrhose
(of a leaf) Ending in a tendril at the apex.
cirrus
See tendril.
cladode
A photosynthetic branch or stem, often leaf-like and usually with foliage leaves either absent or much reduced. Compare phyllode.
cladoptosis
The shedding of entire branches or shoots, rather than just individual leaves.
class
The principal category for taxa ranking between division and order.
clathrate
Shaped like a net or lattice; pierced with apertures, as with a cage.
clavate
Club-shaped.
clavuncula
In the Apocynaceae, an enlarged, drum-shaped stigma of which the sides and lower surface are the receptive zones. Coherent with the anthers or not.
claw
1. A narrow, stalk-like, basal portion of a petal, sepal, or bract.
2. In Melaleuca, the united portion of a stamen bundle.
cleistogamous
Having flowers which self-pollinate and never open fully, or which self-pollinate before opening. Compare chasmogamous.
climacteric
A rough category of fruit that can undergo a ripening phase post-harvest, preceded or accompanied by an increase in ethylene respiration .
climber
A plant growing more or less erect by leaning on or twining around another structure for support, or by clinging with tendrils.
climbing
See climber.
cline

A continuous morphological variation in form within a species or sometimes between two species.
clone
A plant derived from the asexual vegetative reproduction of a parent plant, with both plants having identical genetic compositions.
coalescent
Having plant parts fused or grown together to form a single unit.
cochleariform
Concave and spoon-shaped.
cochleate
Coiled like a snail's shell.
coenobium
An arranged colony of algae that acts like a single organism.
coenocyte
A single cell with multiple nuclei, formed when nuclear division was not followed by cytokinesis.
coleoptile
One type of sheath in the structure of monocotyledonous seeds. The coleoptile is a protective sheath or cap (pileus), generally more or less pointed, that covers the monocotyledonous plumule as it emerges from the soil. It generally turns green and contributes to photosynthesis until its function is superseded by the main growth of the seedling. Contrast this with the coleorhiza, which remains underground until it is superseded as the roots emerge.
coleorhiza
One type of sheath in the structure of monocotyledonous seeds. The coleorhiza connects the coleoptile to the radicle and protects the monocotyledonous radicle during germination. Unlike the coleoptile, the coleorhiza is associated with the root and does not emerge from the soil during germination. Contrast coleoptile.
collenchyma
A specialized tissue consisting of living cells with unevenly thickened cellulose and pectin cell walls that performs a support function in organs such as leaves and young stems that are composed of primary plant tissues.
colleter
A multicellular, glandular hair that usually produces a mucilaginous substance and is located on sepals, stipules, or petioles, or on nearby parts of stems; commonly found on plants in the order Gentianales.
columella
In flowering plants, the tip of the central axis of the cone or fruit, e.g. in Callitris.
column
1. A structure extending above the ovary and incorporating the style and stamens also known as the gynostegium, e.g. in orchids and milkweeds.
2. In grasses, the lower, stouter, and usually twisted part of an awn, distinct from the slender upper part or bristle.
columnar
Shaped like a column.
coma
1. A tuft of hairs from testa or funiculus at one or both ends of some seeds, e.g. in Strophanthus, Asclepias, or Alstonia.
2. Sterile bracts, e.g. in Curcuma, Ananas, or Eucomis.
3. Sterile flowers, e.g. in Muscari and Leopoldia, at the apex of some inflorescences.
4. A tuft of hairs at the base of some flowers, e.g. in Pfaffia gnaphalioides.
5. A tuft of hairs at the apex or base of some spikelets.
6. An axil tuft of hairs in inflorescences in some Poaceae, e.g. in Eragrostis comata.
commercial name
A name often of no botanical standing and not governed by the ICNCP. The term generally applies to names such as Trademark Names, names covered by Plant Breeders Rights, Patents and Promotional Names, which are often used to enhance the sale of a plant.
commissure
The seam or face at which two carpels adhere. See also fissure and suture.
community
An ecological assemblage of plants that characteristically occur together.
compound
Composed of several parts, e.g. a leaf composed of multiple leaflets, a gynoecium composed of multiple carpels, or an inflorescence made up of multiple smaller inflorescences.
compound palmate
Having leaflets that radiate from a central point (usually at the top of a petiole), like spread-out fingers radiating from the palm of a hand. Compare palmate.
compressed
Flattened lengthwise, either laterally (from side to side) or dorsally (from front to back).
concatenate
Joined together in a chain-like form. See also concatenate and catenate.
concolorous
Having the same color throughout; uniformly colored.
conduplicate
Arranged such that two sides of a flat surface are folded along the midline to face each other. See also ptyxis, aestivation, and vernation.
cone
The sexual organs, often woody, and cone-shaped or ovoid to globular, including scales, bracts, or bracteoles arranged around a central axis, found in gymnosperms, especially conifers; also sometimes used colloquially, though botanically incorrectly, for the woody fruit of some angiosperms such as Alnus and Casuarina.
conflorescence
An inflorescence whose overall structure substantially differs from that of the individual branches of the inflorescence, e.g. members of the genera Callistemon, Grevillea and Hollandaea.
conical
In the shape of tree crowns, with a narrow cone shape, tapering evenly from the base to the top, and circular in cross-section. Found in many conifers such as fir and spruce, an adaptation to avoid damage by winter snow. In popular texts often erroneously called "pyramidal", which differs in being broader and having a quadrate cross-section.
connate
Fused to another organ (or organs) of the same kind, e.g. petals in a gamopetalous corolla tube. Compare adnate.
connective
The part of an anther that connects the anther cells.
connivent
Coming into contact or converging.
conspecific
Belonging to the same species.
contiguous
Adjoining, touching, but not united.
contort
(of sepals or petals) A type of imbricate aestivation in which one side of each segment overlaps one of the adjacent segments and the other side is overlapped by the other adjacent segment. See convolute.
contorted
Twisted out of the normal shape.
convolute
1. Referring to the arrangement of floral or foliar organs in a bud when each organ or segment has one edge overlapping the adjacent organ or segment; a form of imbricate arrangement. See contort.
2. (of leaves) A type of vernation in which one leaf is rolled up inside another.
3. A type of vernation of two leaves at a node, in which one half of each leaf is exposed and the other half is wrapped inside the other leaf.
corcle
A plant embryo, plumule, or plumule plus radicle.
cordate
Heart-shaped, with the notch lowermost; of the base of a leaf, like the notched part of a heart. Contrast obcordate.
coriaceous
Leathery; stiff and tough, but flexible. Compare corneous.
corm

A fleshy, swollen stem base, usually underground and functioning in the storage of food reserves, with buds naked or covered by very thin scales; a type of rootstock.
cormel
A small corm (or cormlet), forming at the base of a growing larger corm.
corneous
Horny in texture; stiff and hard, but somewhat tough. Compare coriaceous.
corolla
A collective term for the petals of a flower. Compare calyx.
corolla tube
A tube formed by the fusion of the petals of a flower, for example Volkameria inermis.
corona
1. In flowering plants, a ring of structures that may be united in a tube, inserting inside the corolla and derived from the corolla or stamens. The trumpet of a daffodil is a corona.
2. In grasses, a hardened ring of tissue surmounting the lemma in some species.
cortex

A region of tissue located between the surface cells and the vascular cylinder.
corticolous
Growing on bark or on wood with the bark stripped off. Compare lignicolous.
corymb

An inflorescence with branches arising at different points but reaching about the same height, giving the flower cluster a flat-topped appearance.
costa
A costa is an extension of the petiole into the leaf blade, forming a midrib-like structure. This feature is characteristic of costapalmate leaves, which are intermediate between fan-shaped palmate and feather-like pinnate leaves. Also see rib.
costapalmate
Having a definite costa (midrib), unlike the typical palmate or fan leaf, but with the leaflets arranged radially as in a palmate leaf.
cotyledon
The primary leaf or leaves of a plant embryo which upon germination develops into the seed-leaf or the first set of leaves.
craspedodromous
Pinnate venation in which the secondary veins terminate at the margins, often as teeth.
crateriform
In the shape of a saucer or shallow cup; hemispherical or more shallow.
cremnophyte
A plant adapted to growing on, especially hanging from, cliff faces or crevices. Compare chasmophyte.
crenate
Having blunt or rounded teeth; scalloped.
crenulate
Minutely scalloped.
crisped
Finely curled, as with the edges of leaves and petals.
cristarque cell
A sclereid which contains a druse and has the lignin deposited excentrically on the cell wall to form a cup shape, or in cross-section, a ∪-shape.
crown
See canopy.
cross
To make something interbreed; the act of hybridization.
cruciform
Cross-shaped.
crustaceous
Hard, thin and brittle.
crustose
Forming a closely applied surface layer or crust.
cryptogam
Any of the "lower plants" which produce spores and do not have stamens, ovaries, or seeds; literally, plants whose sexual reproductive organs are not conspicuous. This group typically includes the ferns, bryophytes, and algae, and sometimes fungi (including lichenized fungi). Compare phanerogam.
cucullate
Hood-like or hooded, commonly referring to the shape of leaves or petals, e.g. Pelargonium cucullatum. Similarly derived terms include cuculliform and cuccularis.
culm
In grasses, sedges, rushes, and some other monocotyledons, an aerial stem bearing the inflorescence, extending strictly from the base of the plant to the lowest involucral bract (or base of the inflorescence).
cultigen
A plant whose origin or selection is primarily due to intentional human activity.
cultivar
A term derived from "cultivated variety" denoting an assemblage of cultivated plants clearly distinguished by one or more characters (morphological, physiological, cytological, chemical, or other). When reproduced (either sexually or asexually), the assemblage retains its distinguishing characters. A cultivar may arise in cultivation or be introduced from the wild. It is a variant that is of horticultural interest or value. Cultivar names are written with single quotation marks around them, e.g. 'Blue Carpet' or 'Alba'. All new names established after 1 January 1959 must be in common language (that is, not in Latin), but names established in Latin prior to this date are retained in Latin form.
cultivar epithet
The defining part of a name that denominates a cultivar. Cultivars are designated by fancy (q.v.) epithets appended either to the scientific name or to the common name of the taxon to which they belong; they are not italicized but placed in single quotation marks, e.g. Rubus nitidoides 'Merton Early'. 'Merton Early' is the cultivar epithet.
cuneate
Wedge-shaped, with straight sides converging at a base.
cupule
A cup-shaped structure composed of coalescent bracts, such as the cup of an acorn. See calybium.
cupular
Shaped like a cupule.
cupulate
Bearing cupules.
cupuliform
Nearly hemispherical, shaped like a cupola or dome.
cushion
Said of compact, low-growing plants that is found in alpine, subalpine, arctic, or subarctic environments around the world.
cusp
A hard, pointed tip, stiffer and more formidable than a mucro, hence cuspidate.
cuspidate
Tipped with a cusp, as with some leaves.
cuticle
A waterproofing layer covering the epidermis of aerial plant surfaces and composed of the polymers cutin, and/or cutan and waxes.
cutting
An apical tip of shoot structure, root, or leaf which is cut from a plant and used for asexual vegetative propagation.
cyathium

An inflorescence of unisexual flowers surrounded by involucral bracts, especially the flowers of Euphorbia.
cyathophyll
In Euphorbia, the bract-like structure on which the involucre sits, usually but not always occurring in twos. They may sometimes be brightly colored and confused with petals.
cylindrical
Rod-like and two to three times as long as wide. Compare baculiform.
cynaroid
See carduoid.
cyme

A type of inflorescence in which the main axis and all lateral branches end in a flower (each lateral may be repeatedly branched).
cymose
Having a cyme or cymes.
cypsela
A type of dry, one-seeded, indehiscent fruit formed from an inferior ovary.
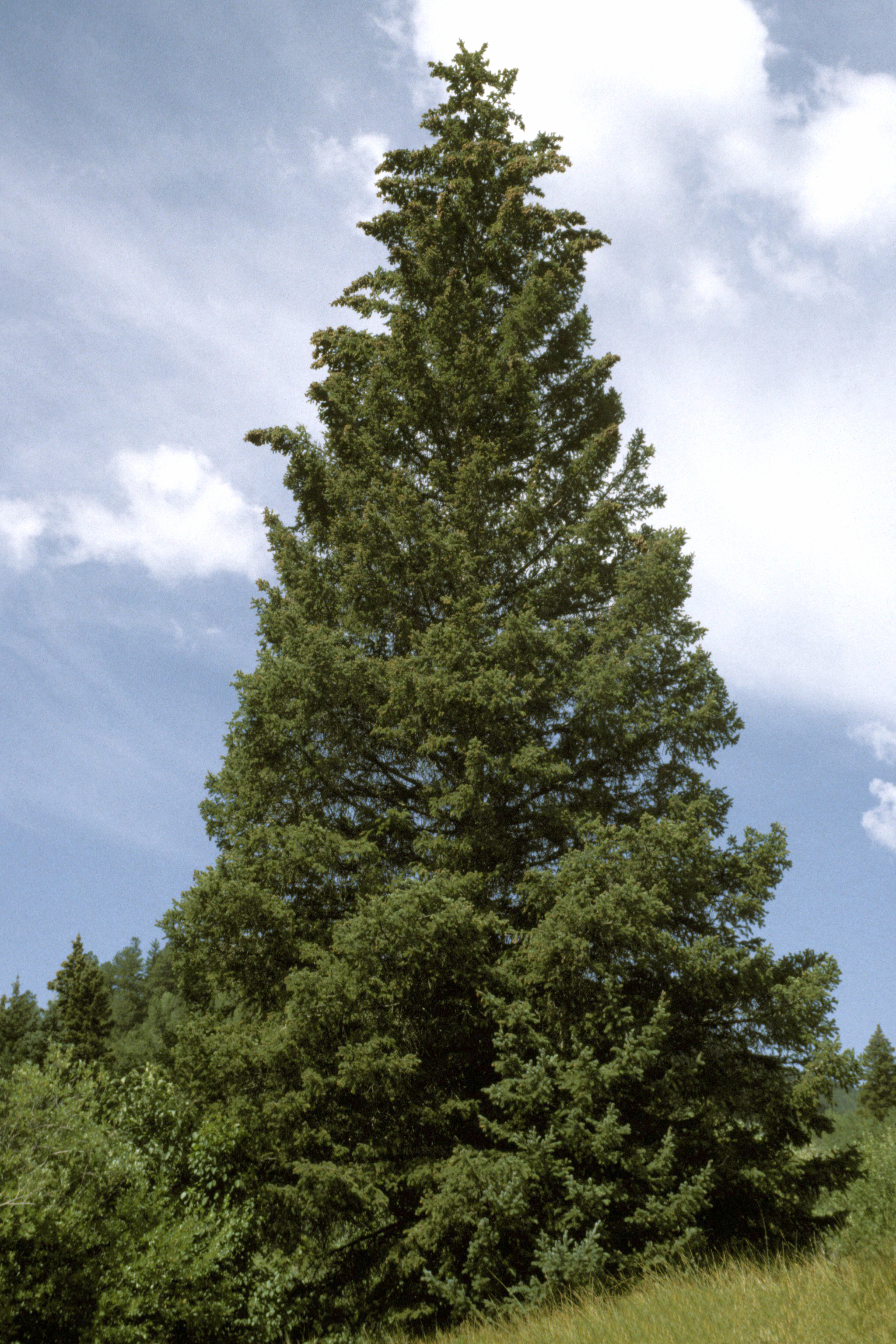
Conical growth habit of Picea pungens

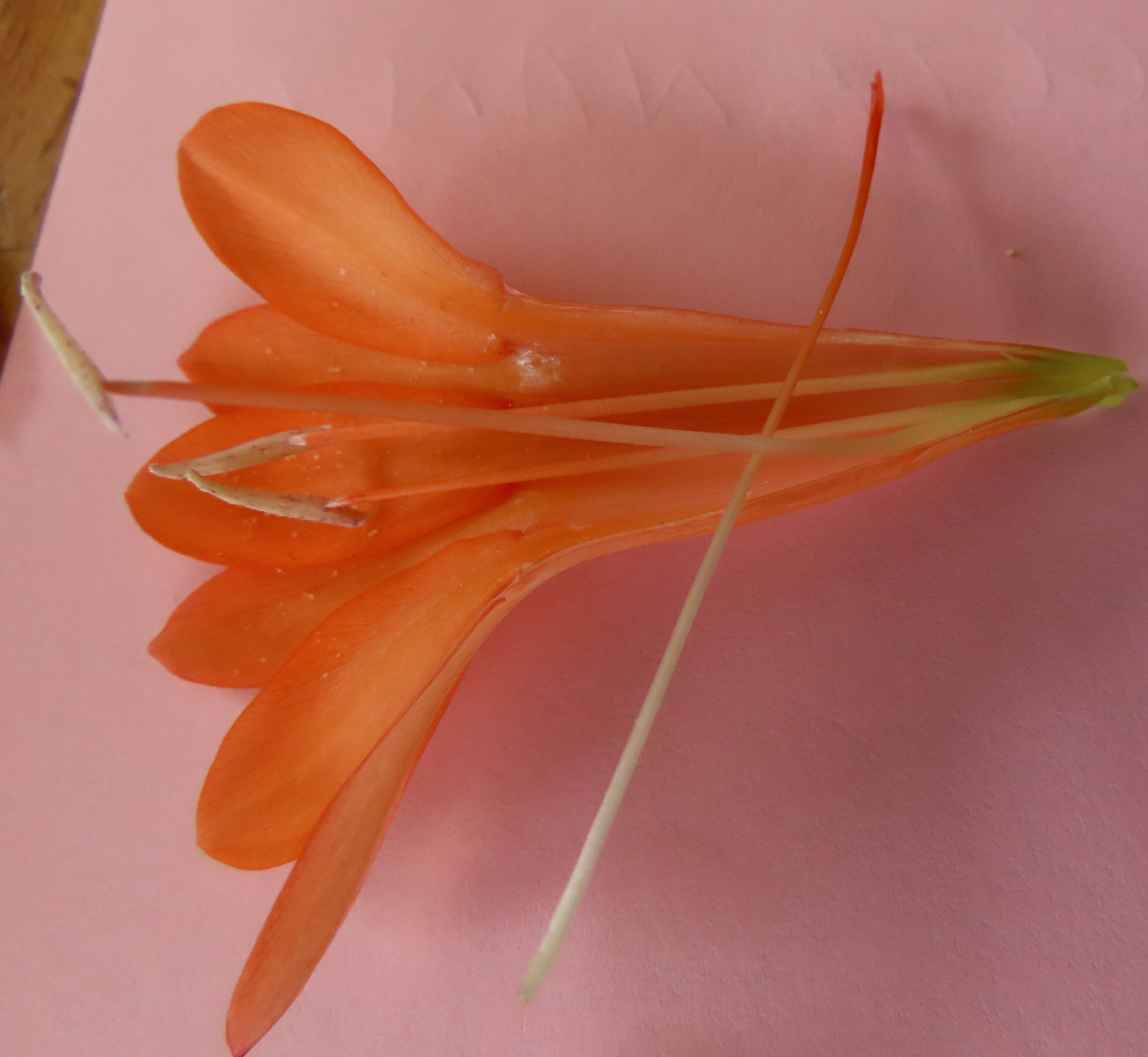
Gamopetalous Watsonia flower split open between two petals to show the connate formation of the corolla tube; compare the adnate attachment of the stamen bases to the matching petals

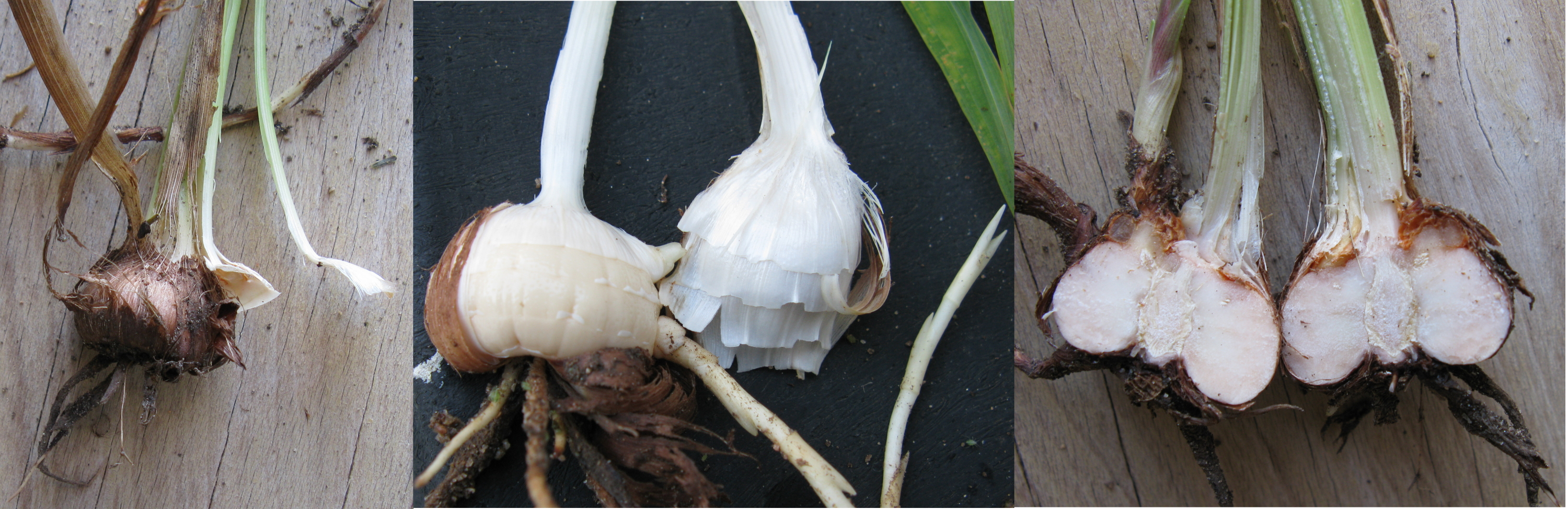
Corms, one entire in its tunic, one partly peeled to show tunic cataphylls, and one split to show inner structure

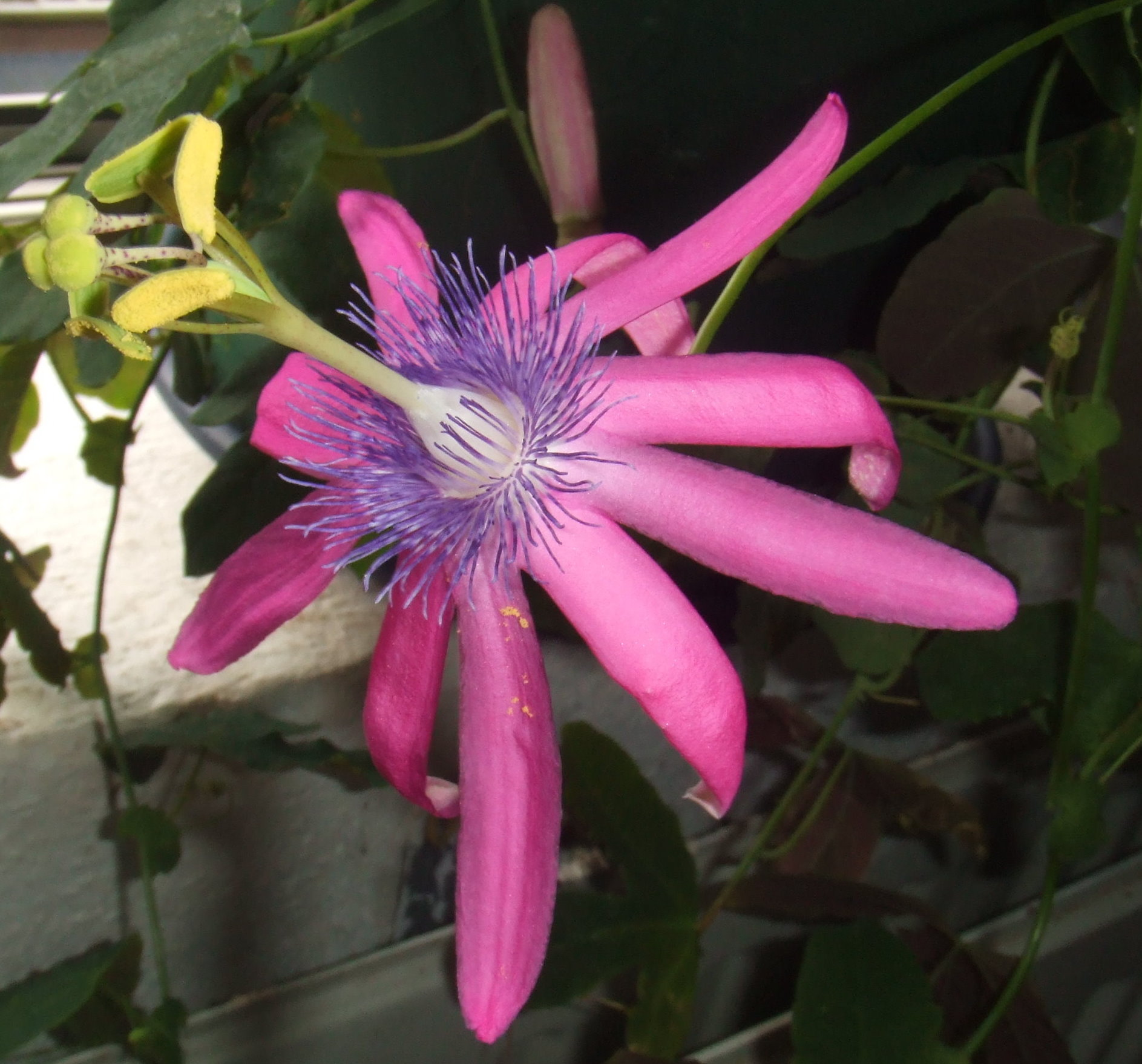
The corona of this Passiflora flower is a ring of purple filaments between the petals and the stamens.

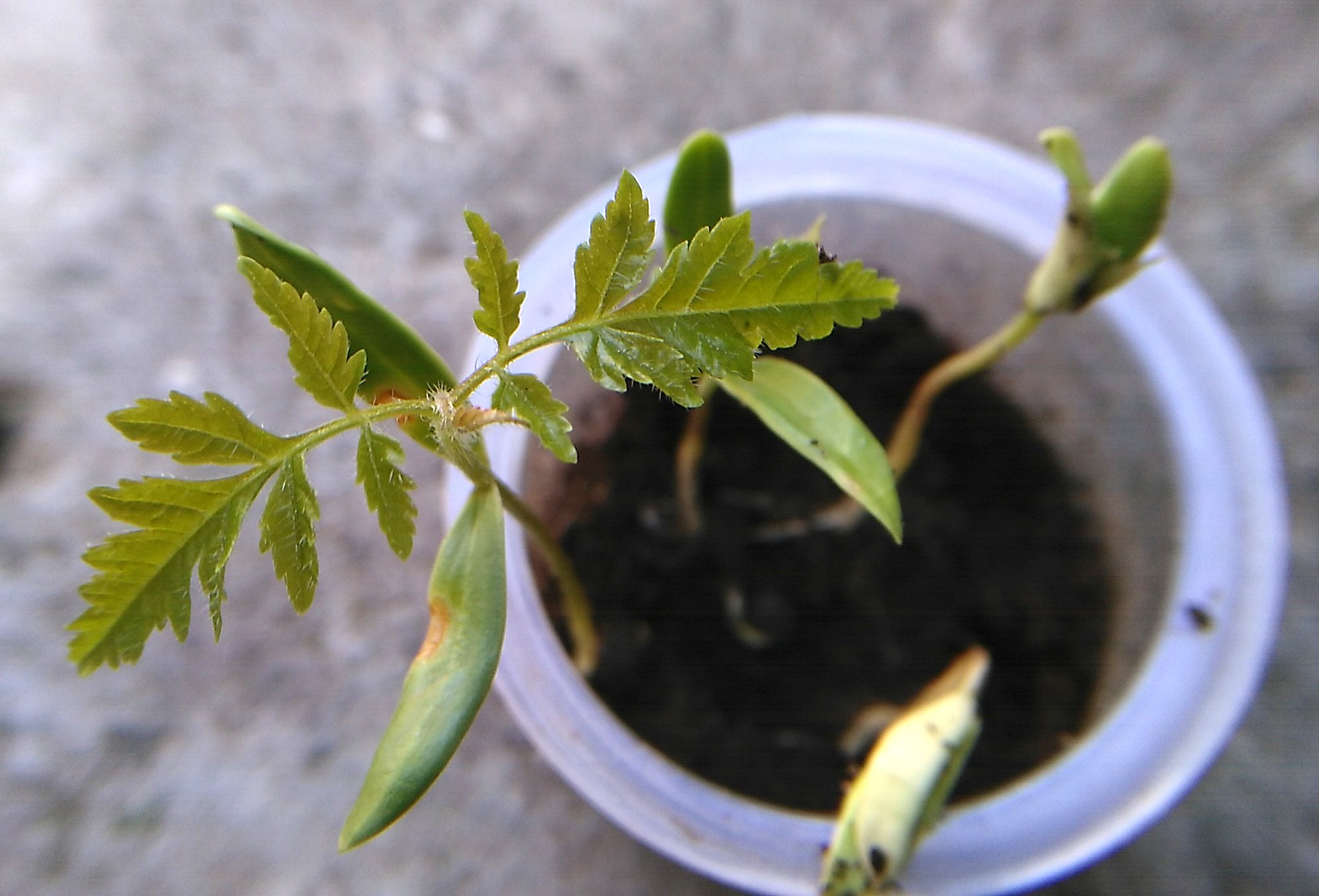
Cotyledons of seedlings of Koelreuteria. One plant shows the first new leaves above its cotyledons, and the rest show various younger stages of emerging cotyledons.

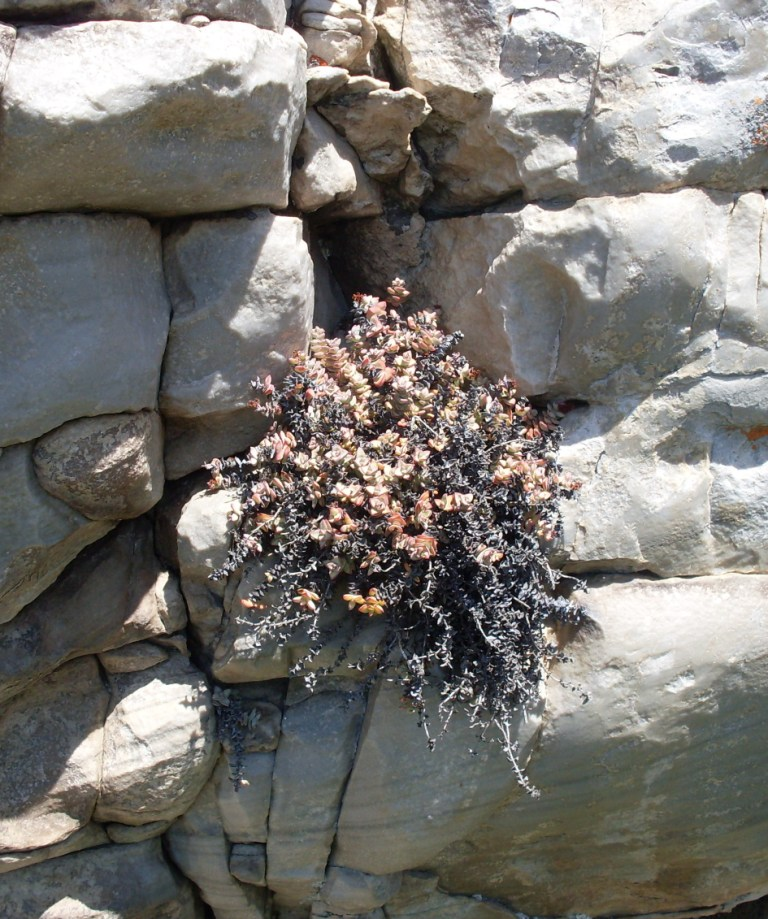
Crassula rupestris frequently grows as a cremnophyte on cliff faces in fynbos.

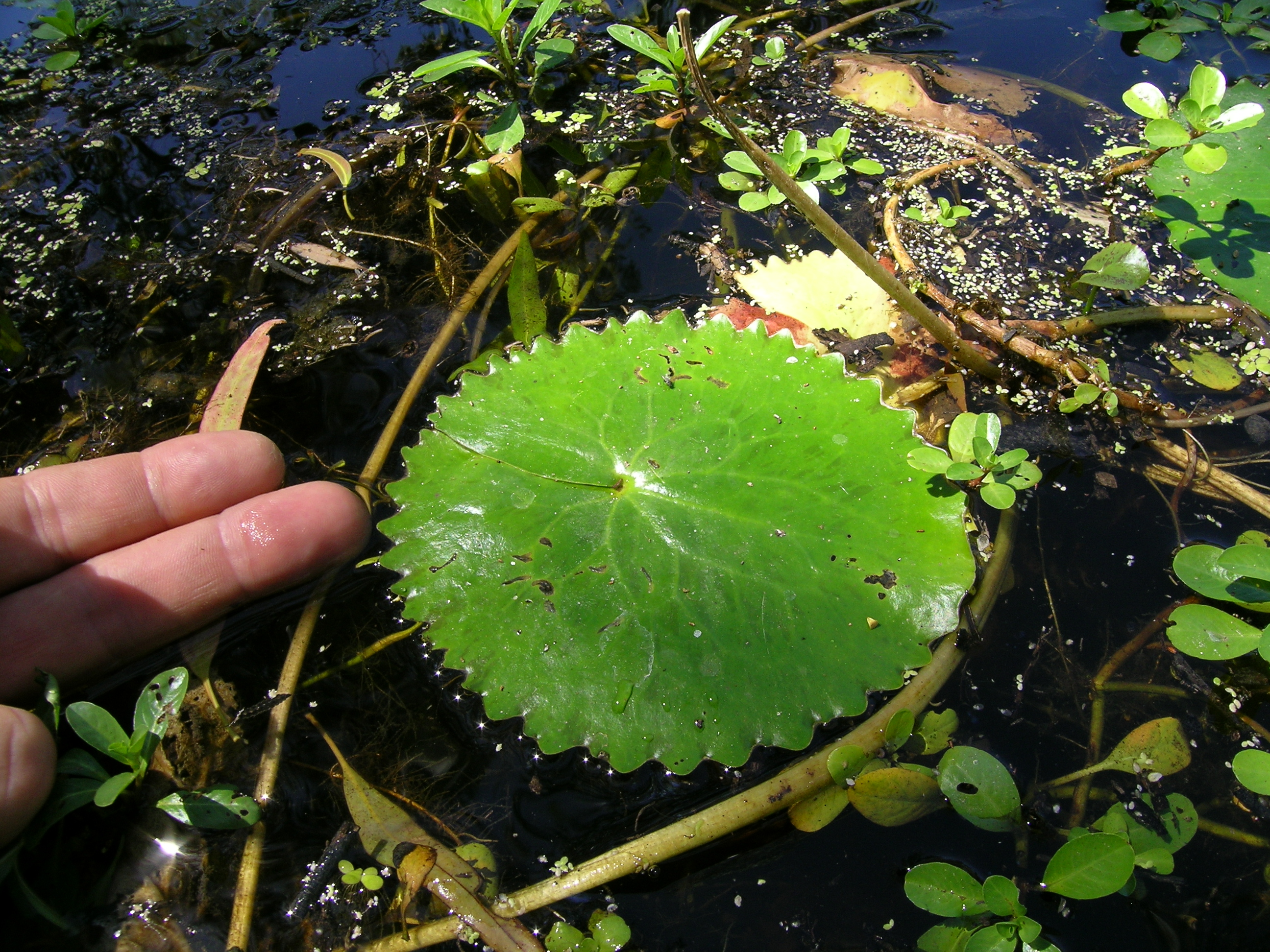
Nymphoides crenata has crenate leaf margins.

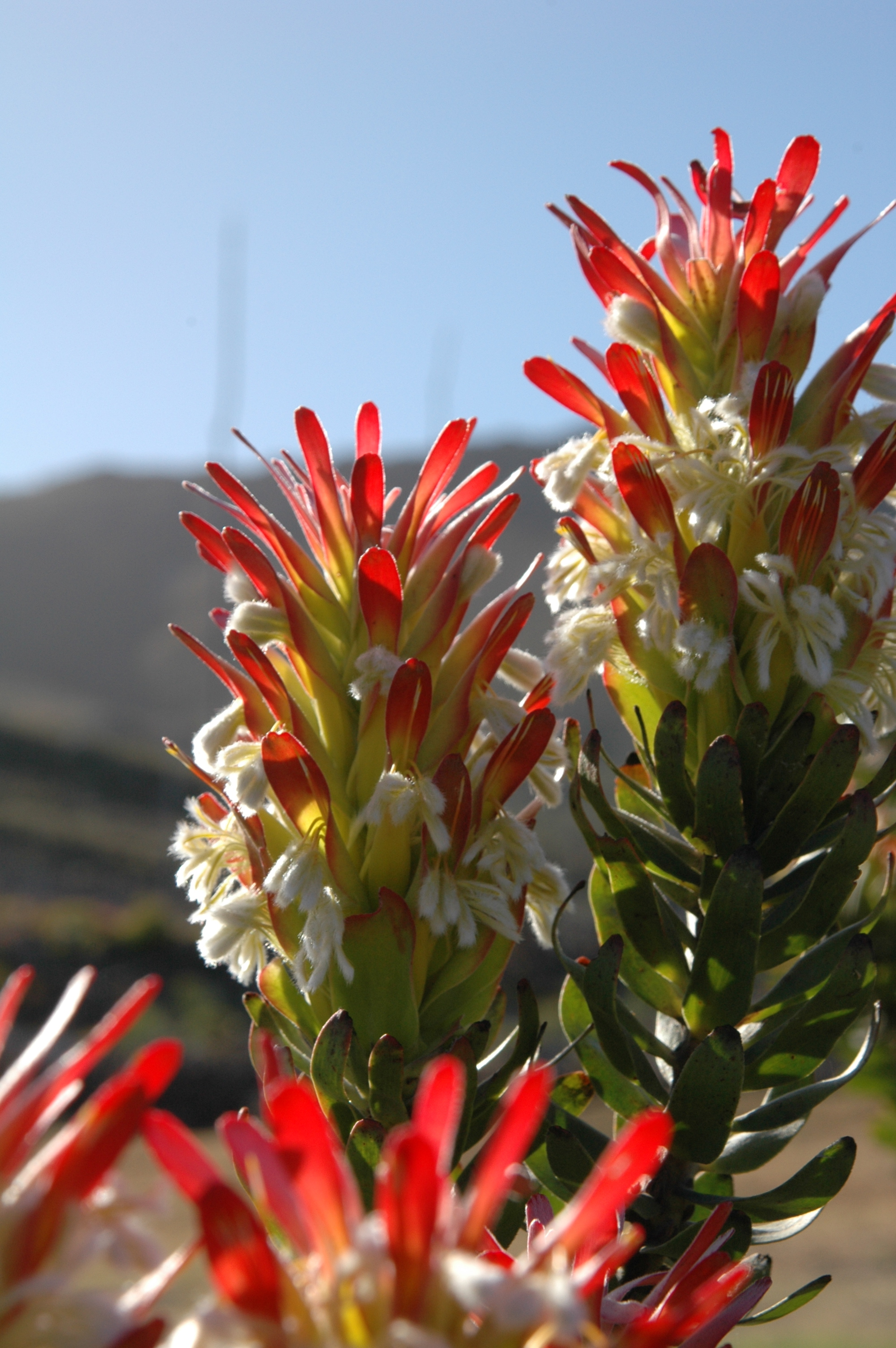
Mimetes cucullatus, so named for the hooded, cucullate shape of its white flowers

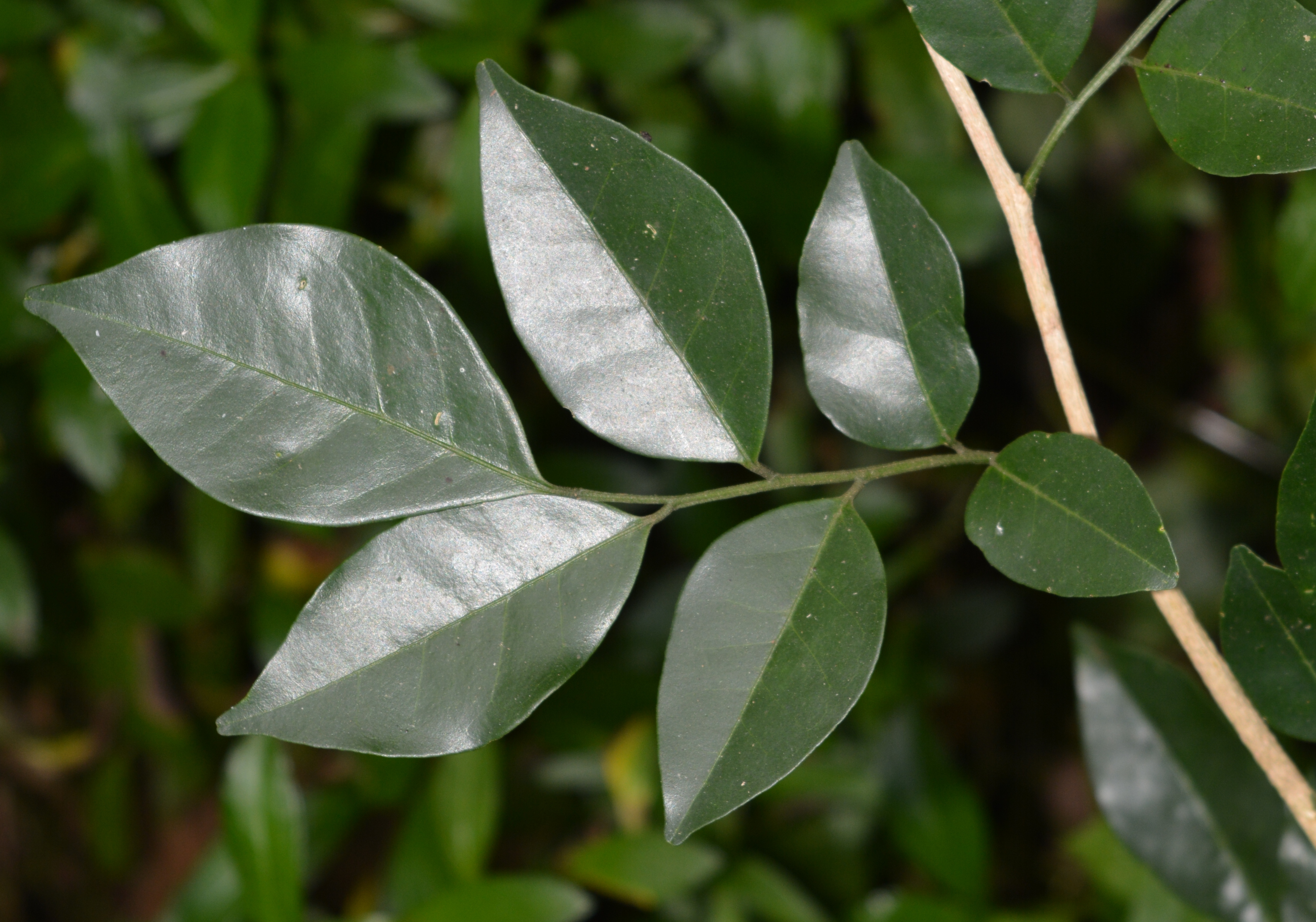
Murraya paniculata has leaves with cuneate (wedge-shaped) bases.

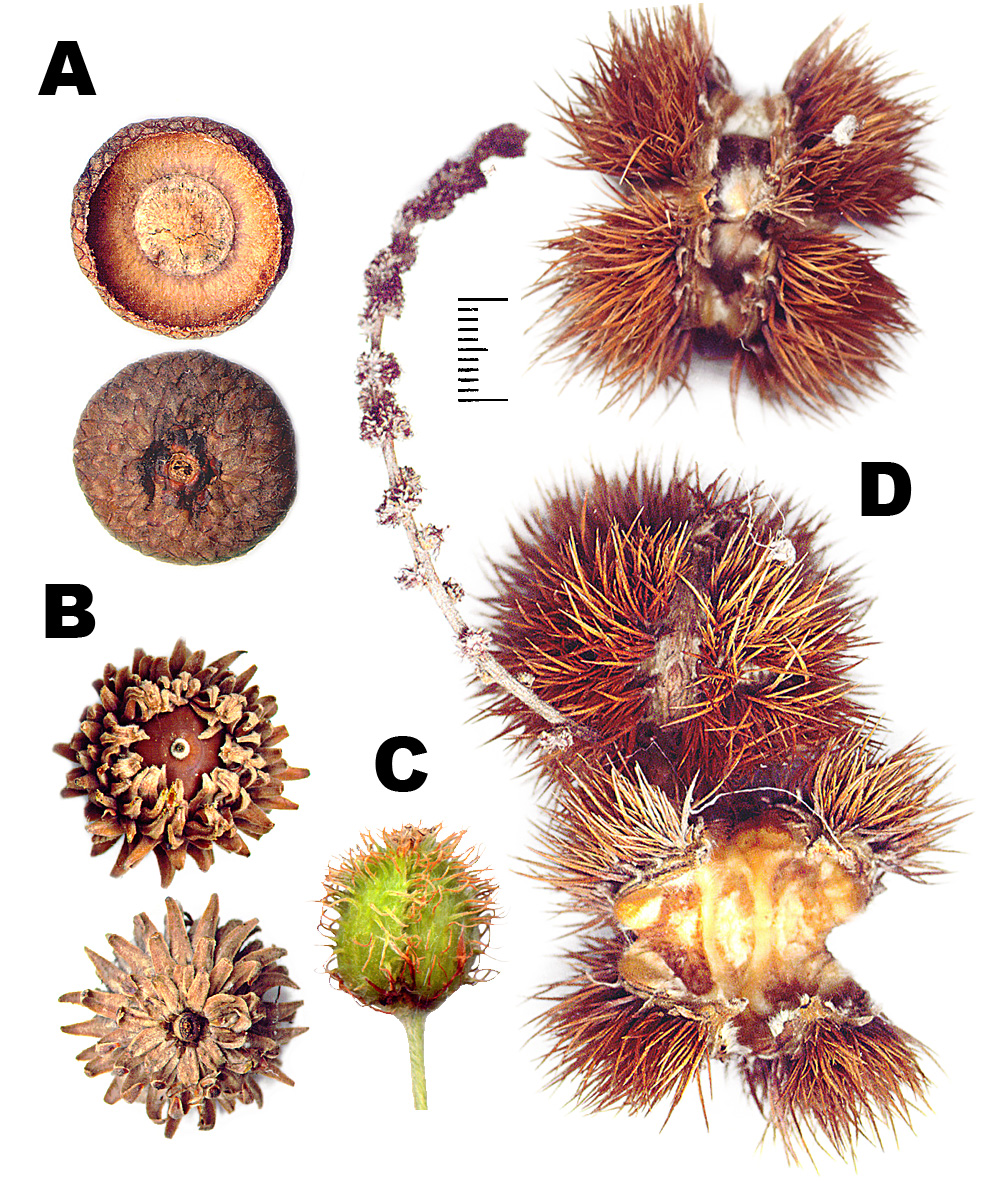
Examples of cupules of Fagaceae:
A: Quercus rubra B: Quercus trojana
C: Fagus sylvatica D: Castanea sativa

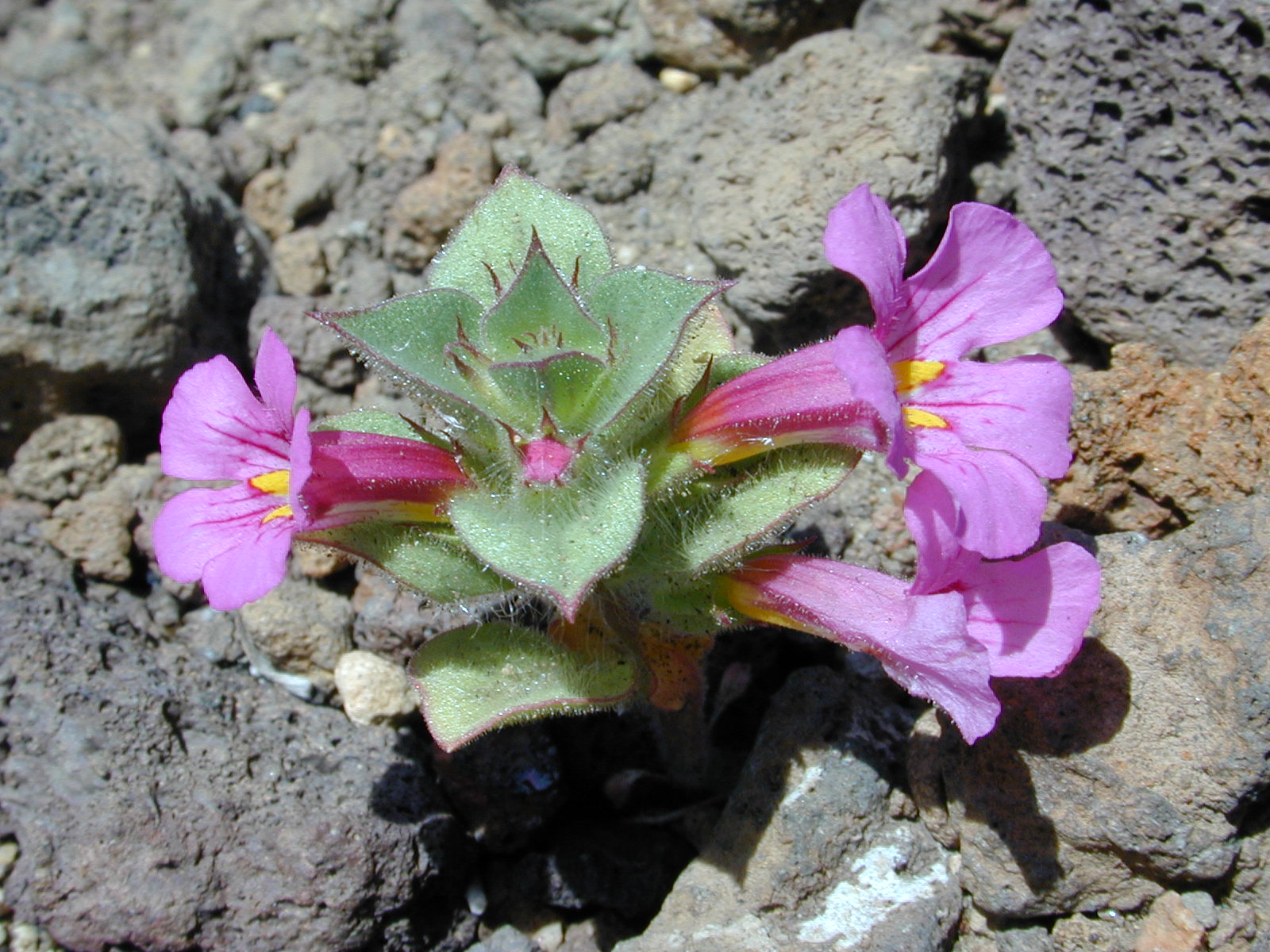
Cuspidate leaves of Diplacus bigelovii var. cuspidatus

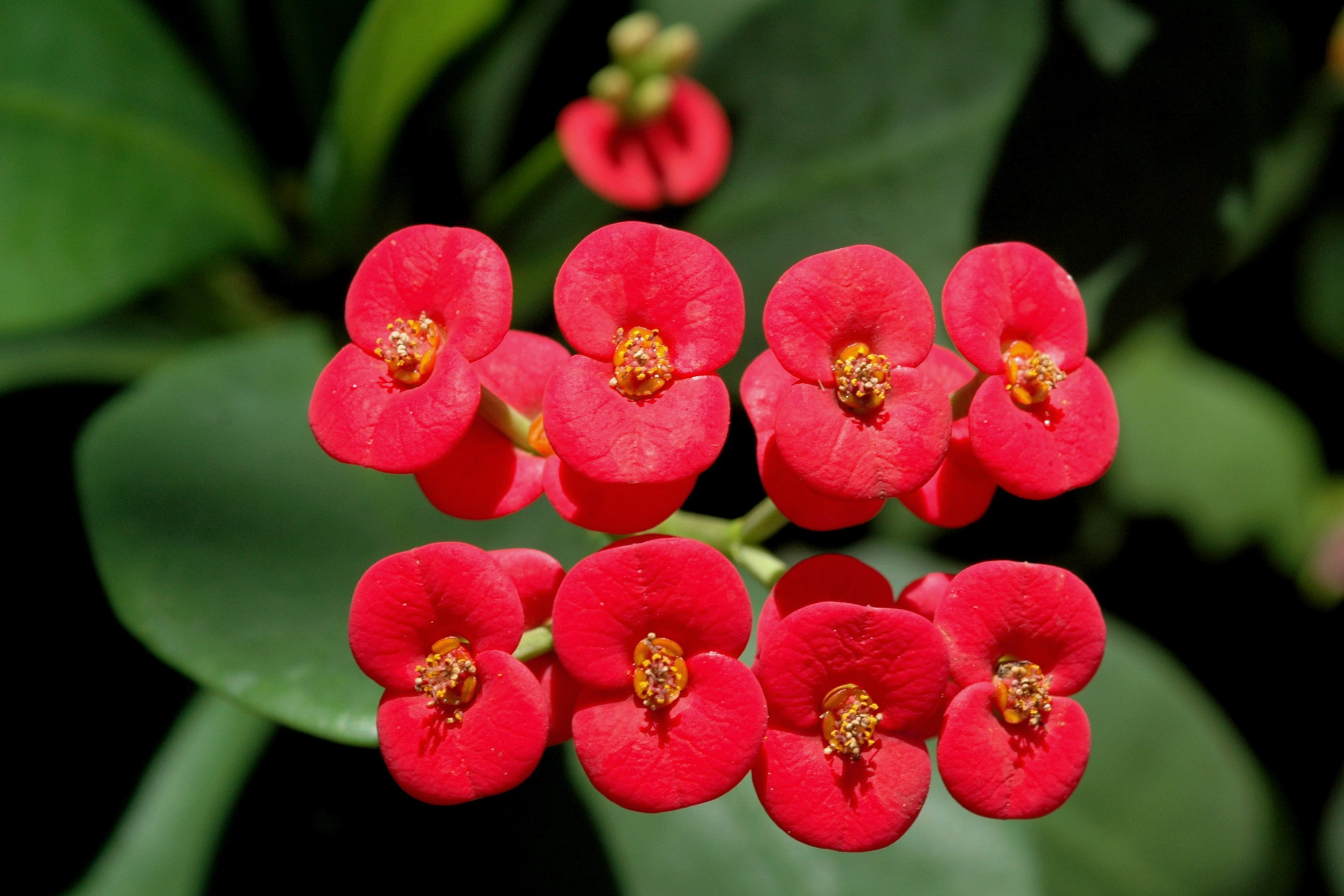
Euphorbia milii is commercially grown for the aesthetic appearance of its brightly colored, bract-like structures called cyathophylls, which sit below the inflorescence.

== D ==
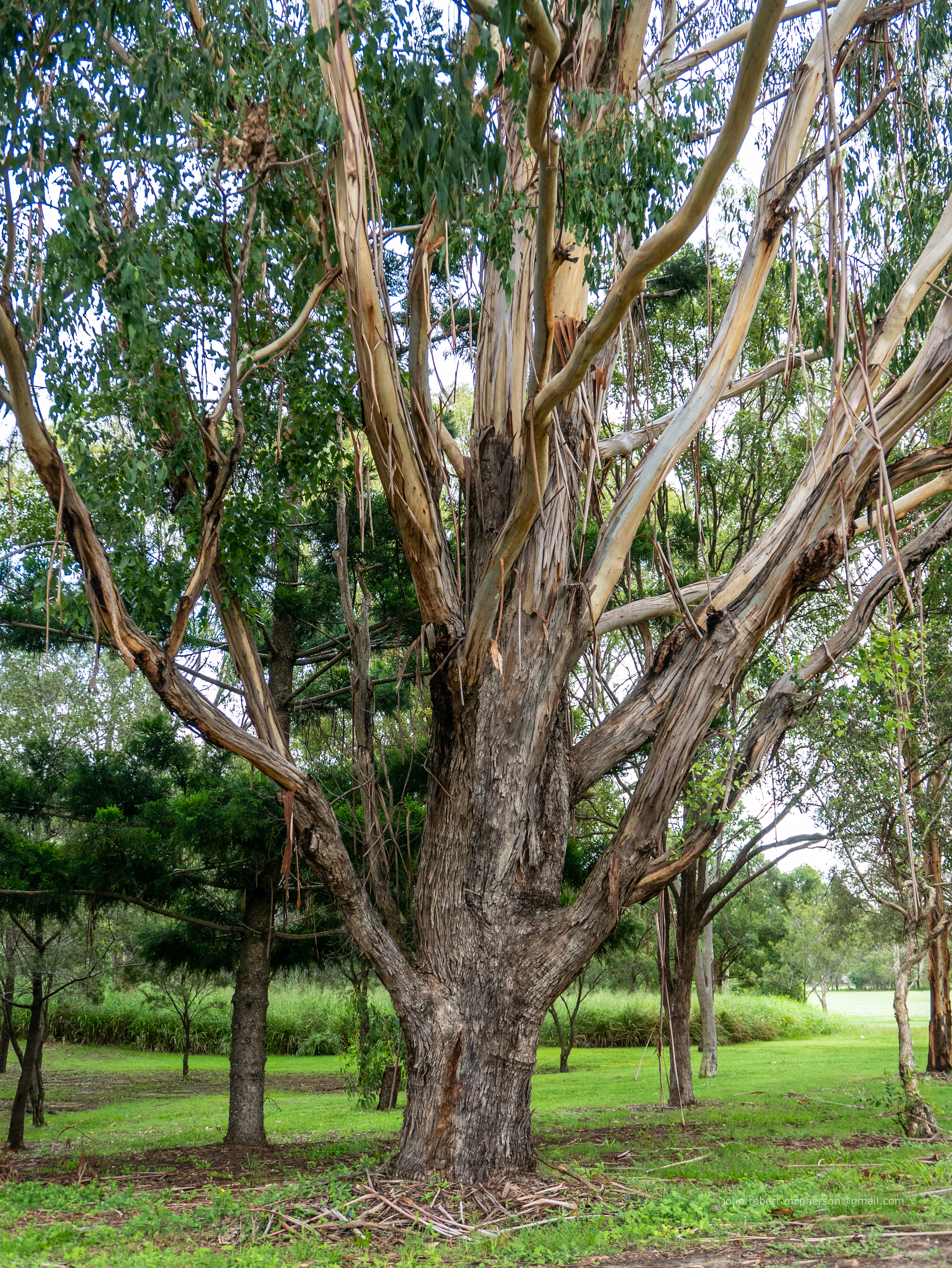
Seasonal, healthy decortication of Eucalyptus grandis outer bark

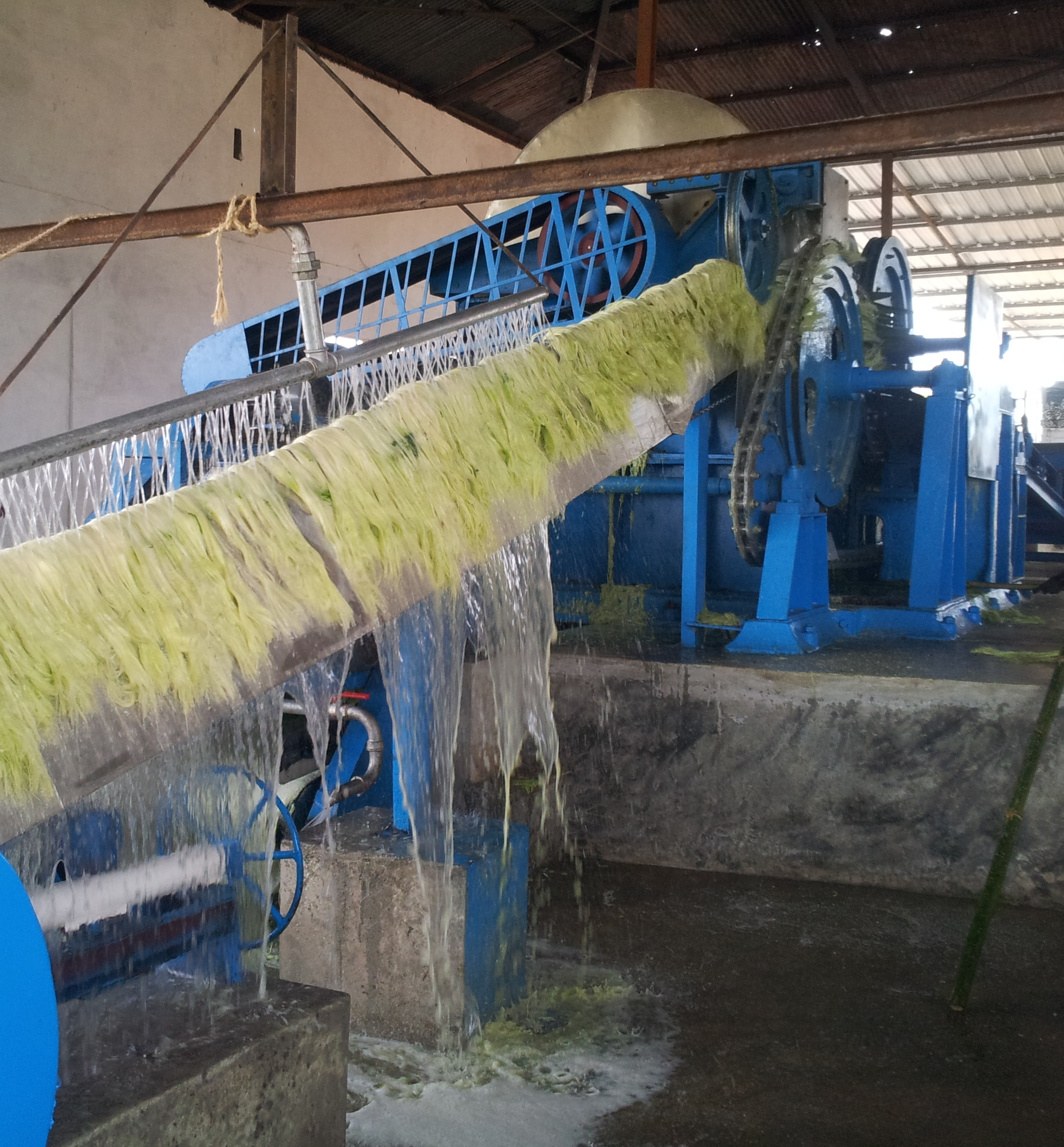
A decorticating machine collecting fiber from leaves

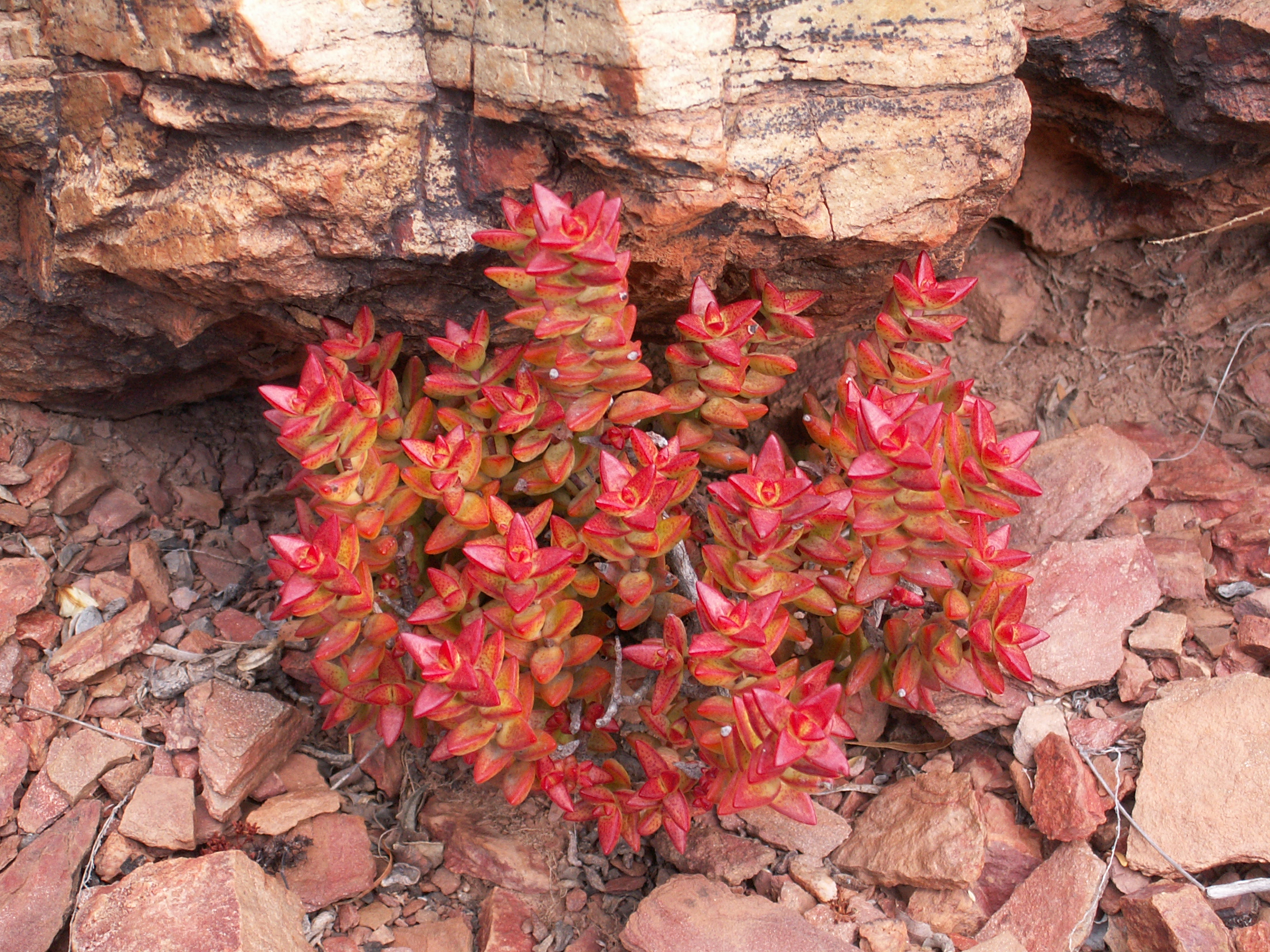
Decussate phyllotaxis of Crassula rupestris

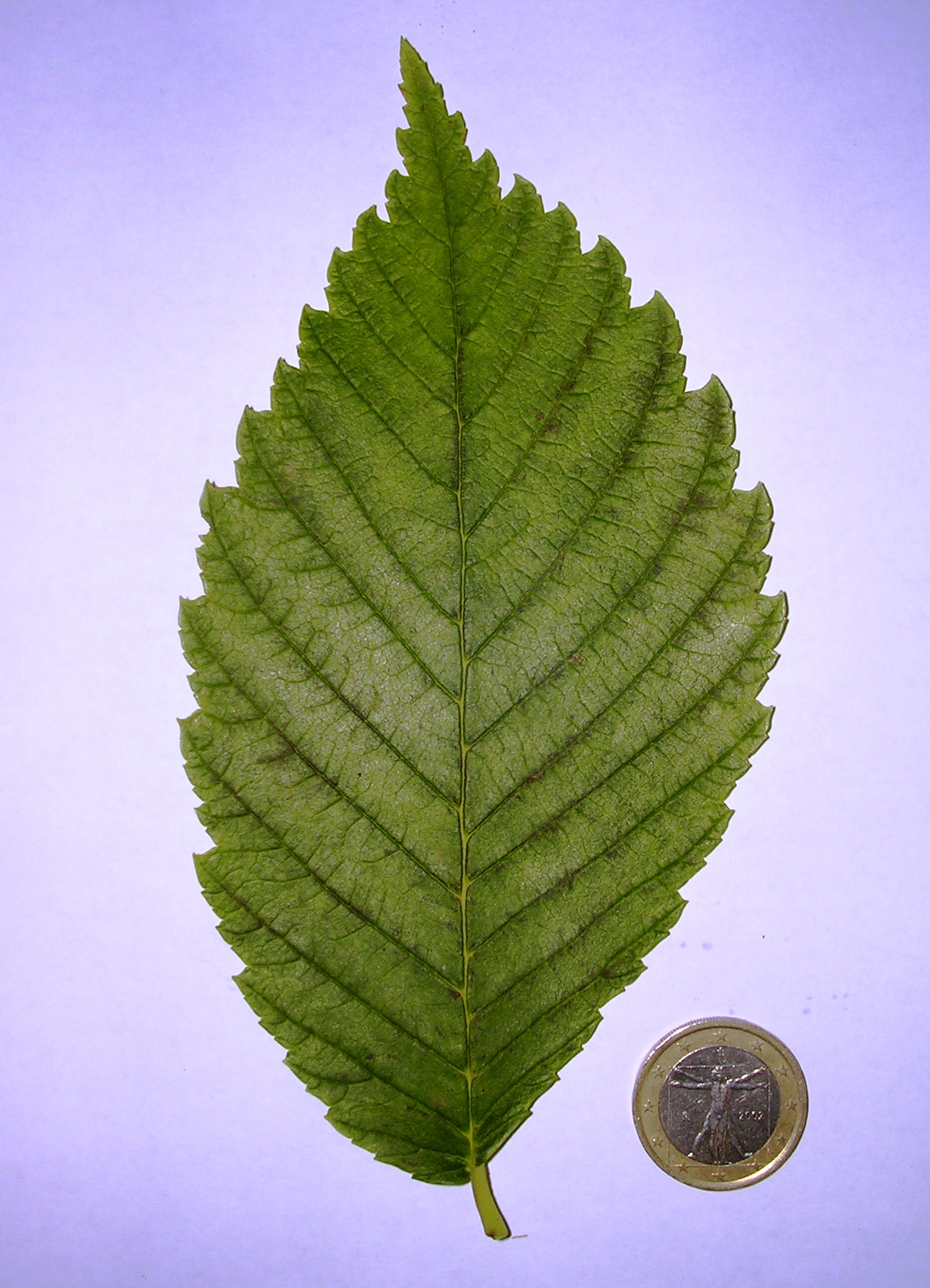
Dentate leaf of elm

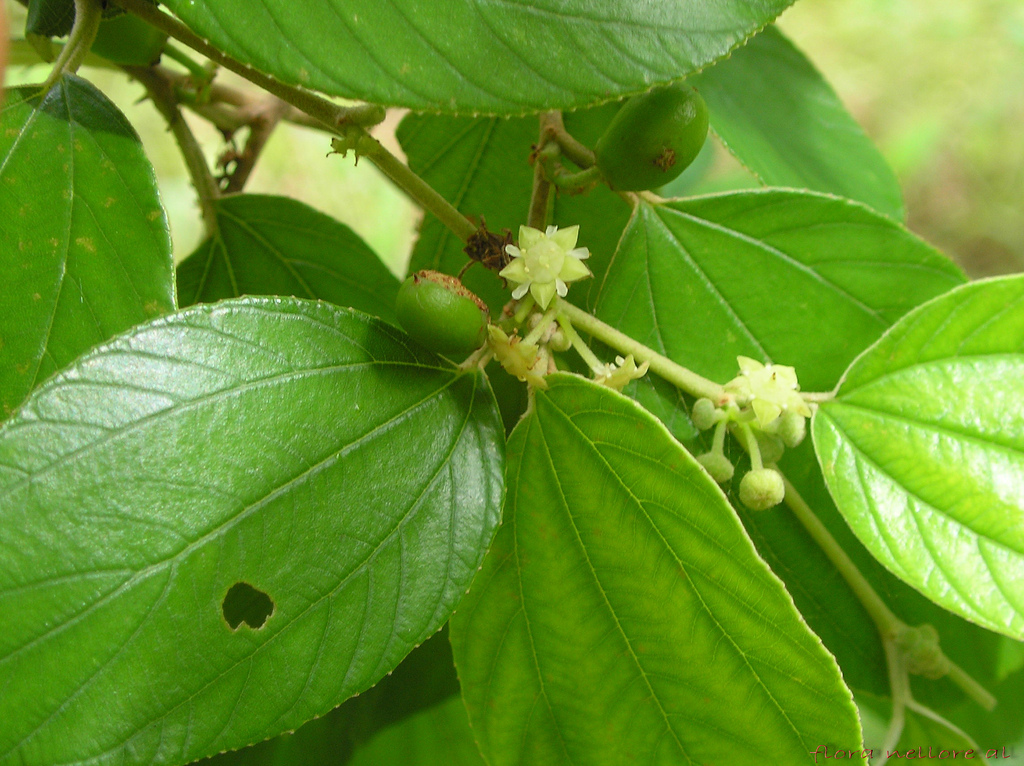
Denticulate leaves of Ziziphus mauritiana

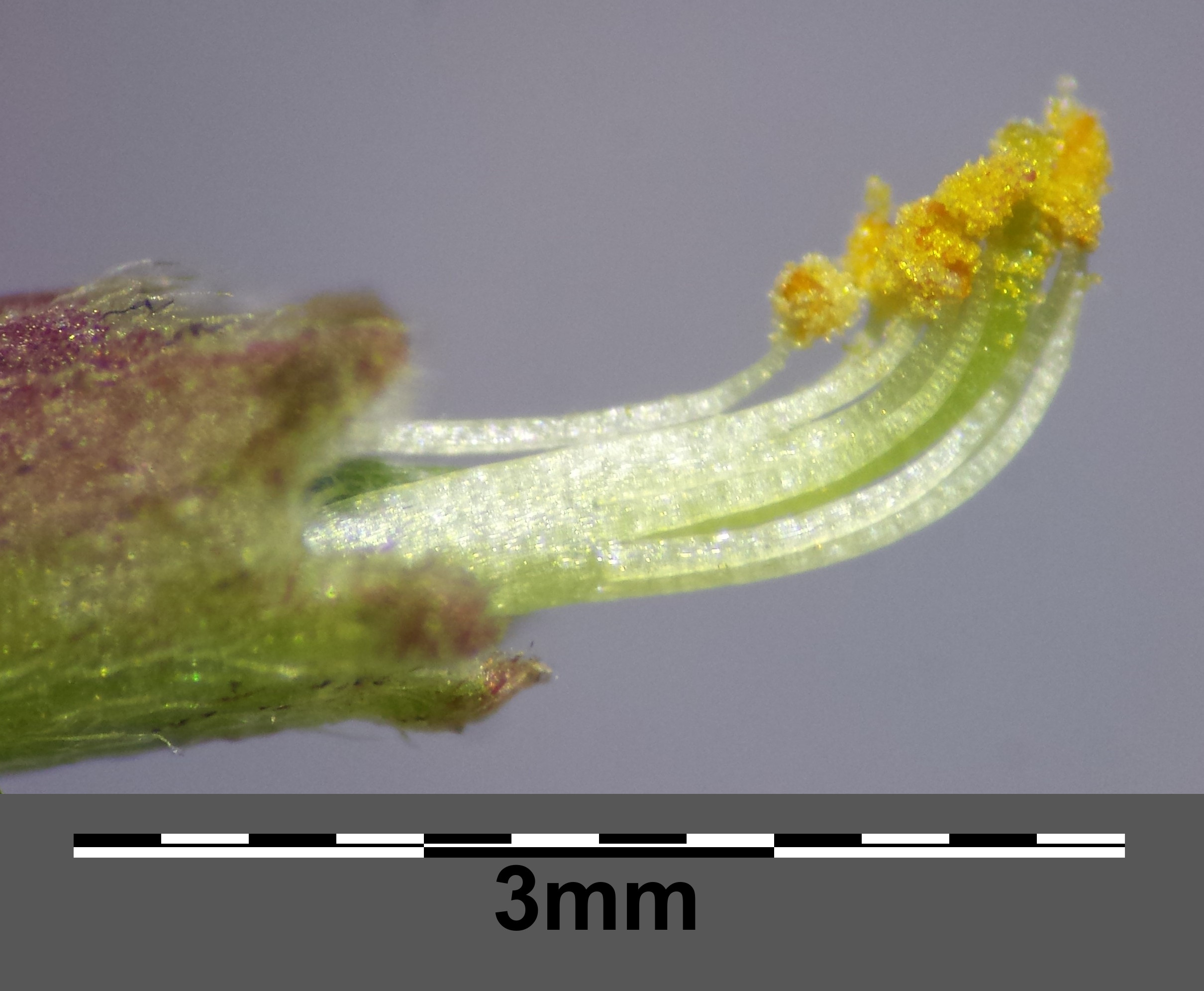
Astragalus austriacus is regarded as diadelphous because it has one stamen unattached to the main adelphia (bunch).

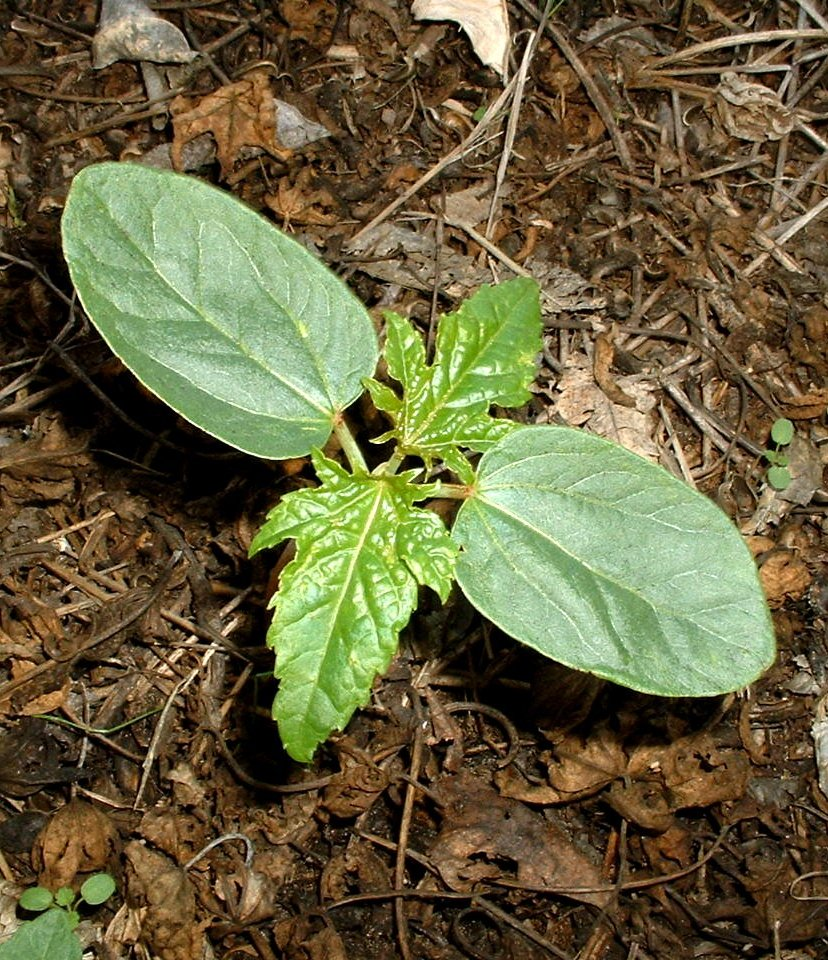
The paired cotyledons of a castor bean seedling (Ricinus communis) are typical of a dicotyledon.

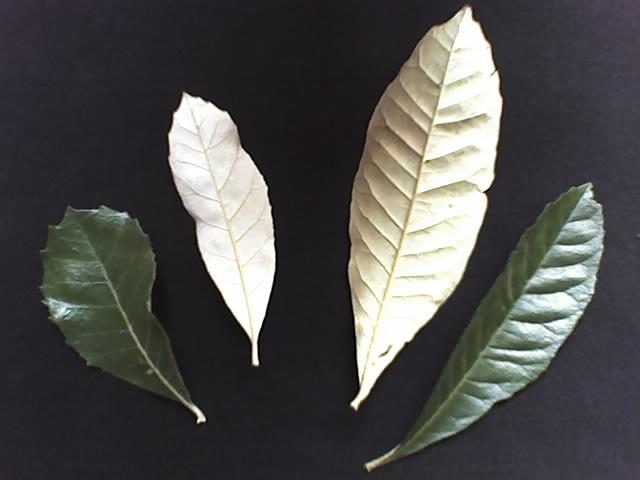
Discolorous leaves of Brachylaena discolor differ in color between their upper and lower surfaces.

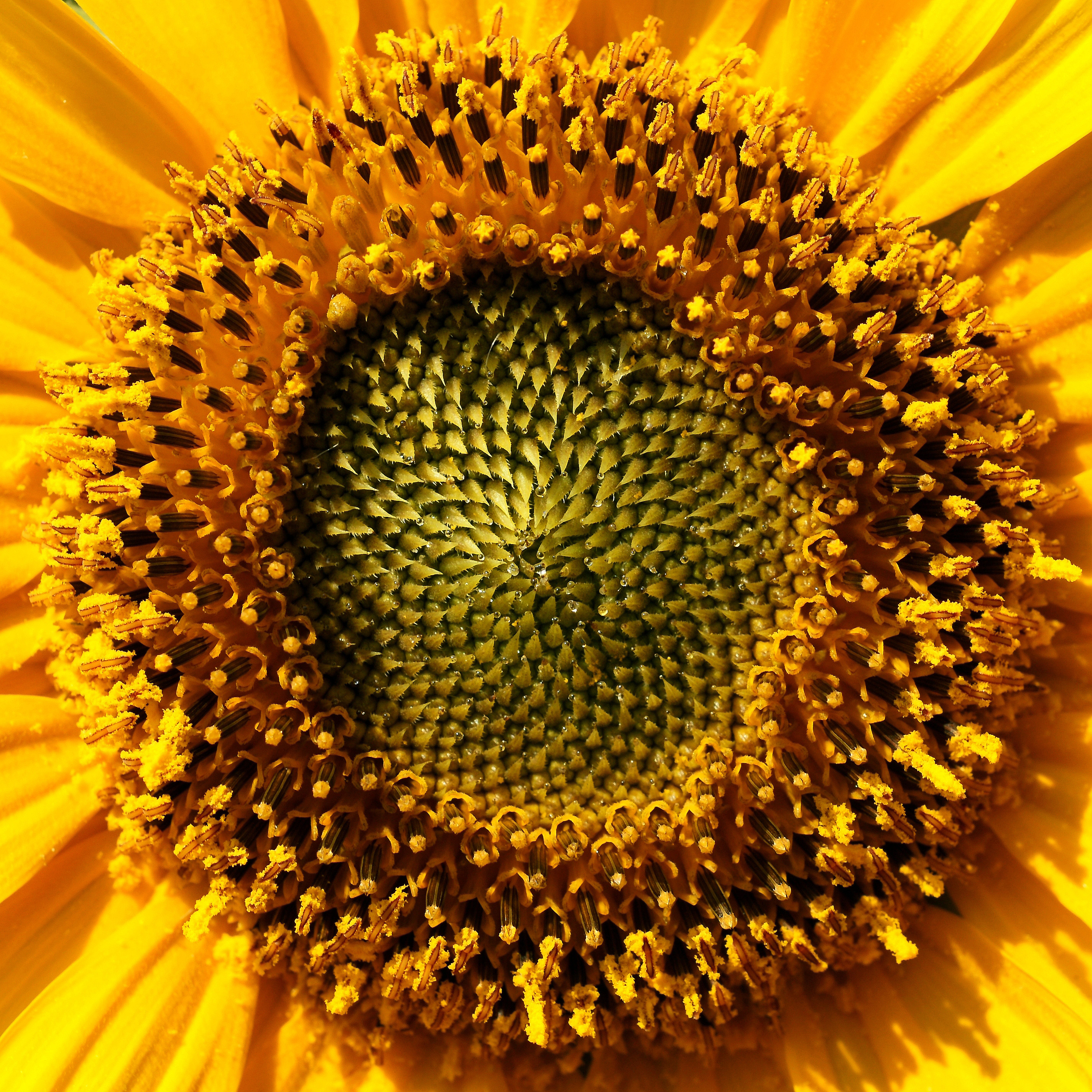
Disk florets opening in a capitulum of a cultivated Helianthus. They open progressively from the edge to the center of the disk.

deciduous
Dehiscing and falling seasonally, as with bark, leaves, or petals. Contrast persistent.
declinate
Curving downward, and then upward at the tip. Often qualified, e.g. declinate-ascendant.
decompound
Divided to more than one level, e.g. in bipinnate leaves, in which the leaflets of what would otherwise be a pinnate leaf are themselves pinnately divided.
decorticate
1. (intr. v.) To shed the outer bark of a tree, usually seasonally as part of the natural growth cycle.
2. (tr. v.) To strip the peel, crust, bark, or other surface tissues from a plant or from harvested material, such as in extracting fiber from harvested Agave leaves.
decumbent
Having branches growing horizontally along the ground but which are turned up at the ends.
decurrent
Extending downward beyond the point of insertion, e.g. when the base of a leaf or a fungal gill is prolonged downward along the stem in a raised line or narrow wing.
decussant
A synonym of decussate; the usage decussant is questionable and occurs rarely, probably as an error. The formally correct usage is decussate.
decussate
Opposite with successive pairs borne at right angles to the last; generally applied to the arrangement of leaves.
definite
Of a constant number, e.g. twice as many stamens as petals or sepals (or less), or an inflorescence ending in a flower or an aborted floral bud, typically a cymose inflorescence. Contrast indefinite.
deflexed
Bent downward. Contrast inflexed.
dehiscent
Breaking open at maturity to release contents; refers e.g. to the opening of fruits to release seeds, of anthers to release pollen, and of sporangia to release spores. Contrast indehiscent.
deltoid
Shaped like the uppercase Greek letter Δ, i.e. like a more or less equilateral triangle.
dendroid
Tree-like; branching like a tree.
dentate
Toothed, especially in reference to leaf margins.
denticulate
Finely toothed; a diminutive form of dentate.
deserticolous
Inhabiting a desert.
determinate
Limited, usually in growth. Contrast indeterminate.
diadelphous
Referring to a class of adelphous structure in which the stamens or similar organs are connected in two adelphiae instead of just one.
diaspore
Any reproductive part of a plant adapted for dispersal and for establishing new plants; may be a disseminule such as a seed, or other parts such as specialized buds, branches, inflorescences, or fruits.
dichasium
A cymose inflorescence with all branches below the terminal flower in regular opposite pairs. Compare monochasium and pleiochasium.
dichlamydeous
Having a perianth which is divided into a separate calyx and corolla. Compare homochlamydeous.
dichotomous
Forking into two equal branches. This may result from an equal division of the growing tip, or may be sympodial, in which the growing tip is aborted and replaced. Typically refers to mode of branch growth, as in Aloidendron dichotomum, but also to other organs, such as the venation patterns on leaves, the thorns of various species of Carissa (which morphologically are branches), and the thalli or hyphae of various algae and fungi.
dicotyledon

A flowering plant whose embryo has two or more cotyledons (seed leaves). Contrast monocotyledon.
digitate
With segments spreading from a common center, like the fingers of a hand. See also palmate and palmatisect. See also Leaf shape.
digitiform
Shaped like a finger.
dimidiate
Halved. Referring to phyllodes with one more or less straight edge and the other edge convex.
dimorphic
Occurring in two different forms (with respect to shape and/or size), e.g. of stamens, fronds, or leaves. See also monomorphic (having a single form) and polymorphic (having many forms).
dioecious
(of vascular plants) Having male and female reproductive structures which develop only on different individuals and never on the same individual. Contrast monoecious.
dioicous
(of a bryophyte gametophyte) Having male and female reproductive structures which develop only on different individuals and never on the same individual. Contrast monoicous.
diploid
Having two complete sets of chromosomes in the nucleus of a sporophyte cell, i.e. one set from each of the parental gametes. This is often expressed symbolically as 2n, where n = the number of chromosomes in the haploid gamete.
diplostemonous
Having stamens arranged in two whorls, with the outer whorl alternating with the petals while the inner whorl is opposite the petals. Compare obdiplostemonous and haplostemonous.
disc

A plate or ring of structures derived from the receptacle, and occurring between whorls of floral parts. In some groups, especially Sapindales, the nectary is in the form of a prominent disk. In daisies, the central part of the capitulum is a disk, hence flowers borne there are called disk flowers or florets.
discoid
Resembling a disc or plate, having both thickness and parallel faces and with a rounded margin. Also used to describe the flower head of Asteraceae where there are no ray florets but only disc florets.
discolorous
(of leaves) Having upper and lower surfaces of different colors.
disjunct
Occurring in widely separated geographic areas, distinctly separate; applies to a discontinuous range in which one or more populations are separated from other potentially interbreeding populations with sufficient distance so as to preclude gene flow between them.
disk floret
A floret occurring most typically in the disk of the capitulum of flowers in the family Asteraceae, and to some extent in other plants that bear a flowering head with a disk, such as Scabiosa.
dissected
Deeply divided; cut into many segments.
dissepiment
A partition or septum in a plant part, usually referring to septa between the loculi of capsules or of other fruits with multiple partitions.
distal
Remote from the point of origin or attachment; the free end. Contrast proximal.
distichous
Arranged in two opposite rows (and hence in the same plane).
distinct
Separate or free; not united.
distyly
The condition in which the flowers of a species occur in two forms that differ only by the length of the style and stamens, and flowers of only one of these forms appear on any one plant. Compare heterostyly.
diurnal
Of the day; occurring or opening in the daytime.
divaricate
Wide-spreading.
divergent
Spreading in different directions, generally upward.
division
A taxonomic rank below kingdom in the standard taxonomic hierarchy. "Division" is generally used only for plants, and is the approximate botanical equivalent of the term phylum, which is used for animals and other kingdoms.
domatia

Any hollow structure formed by a plant that is inhabited by animals such as ants or mites.
dorsal
From Latin dorsum, a ridge or the back of an animal. Partly because the term originally referred to animals rather than plants, usage in botany is arbitrary according to context and source. In general "dorsal" refers to "the rear or back or upper surface", but in botanical usage such concepts are not always clearly defined and may be contradictory. For example:
- facing away from the axis (abaxial) in a lateral organ of an erect plant
- facing away from the substrate in any part of an erect plant, for example the upper surface of a more or less horizontal leaf (adaxial) or the upper part of the crown of the plant
- facing away from the substrate in a prostrate or climbing plant or floating leaves such as those of Nymphaea.
Derived or related terms include dorsad, "toward the dorsal", and dorsum, "the dorsal part of the organ or organism as a unit". Related anatomical terms of location include ventral, lateral.
dorsifixed
Attached at or by the back, e.g. anthers on a filament.
dorsiventral
Having structurally and visibly different upper and lower surfaces, e.g. some leaves. Compare bilateral and isobilateral.
drip tip
A long, narrow, acuminate, caudate, or cuspidate extension at the tip of a leaf or leaflet. Commonly an adaptation to rainy conditions, as it promotes shedding of water by its dripping from the narrow tip. The term drip tip is not anatomically descriptive in the way that acuminate or cuspidate are, for example; rather, it is a description of the functional shape that aids dripping, regardless of the specific geometry of the shape itself.
drupe
A type of succulent fruit formed from one carpel; the single seed is enclosed by a stony layer of the fruit wall, e.g. in peaches and olives. Also called a kernel.
drupelet
A small drupe formed from one of the carpels in an apocarpous flower. Drupelets usually form a compound fruit, as in Rubus, but they may become widely separated, as in Ochna.
druse
A globular mass of calcium oxalate crystals, usually with the crystals radiating from an organic core.
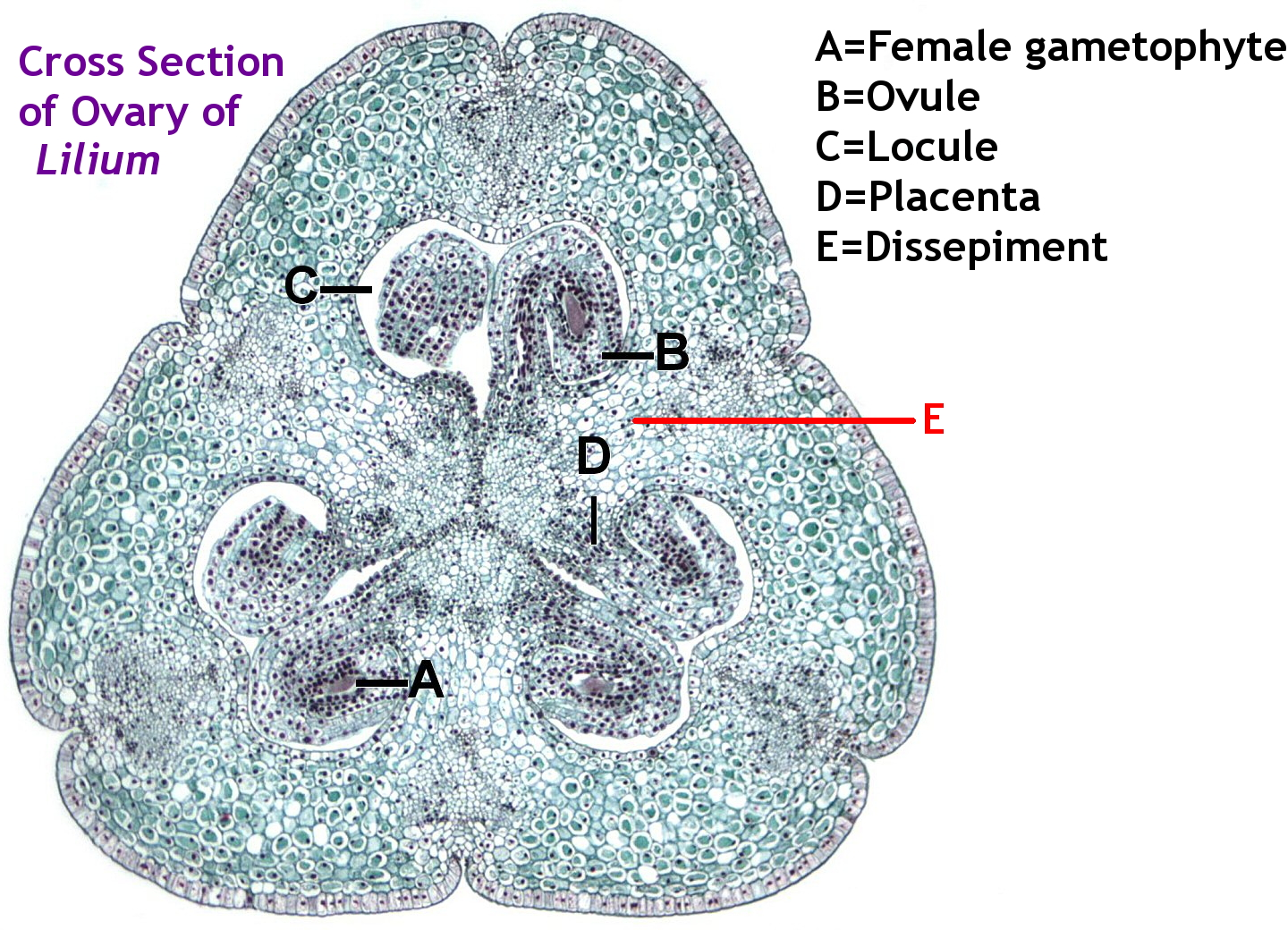
Dissepiment developing in tissue of carpels where they meet to form locules in the capsule of the ovary of Lilium

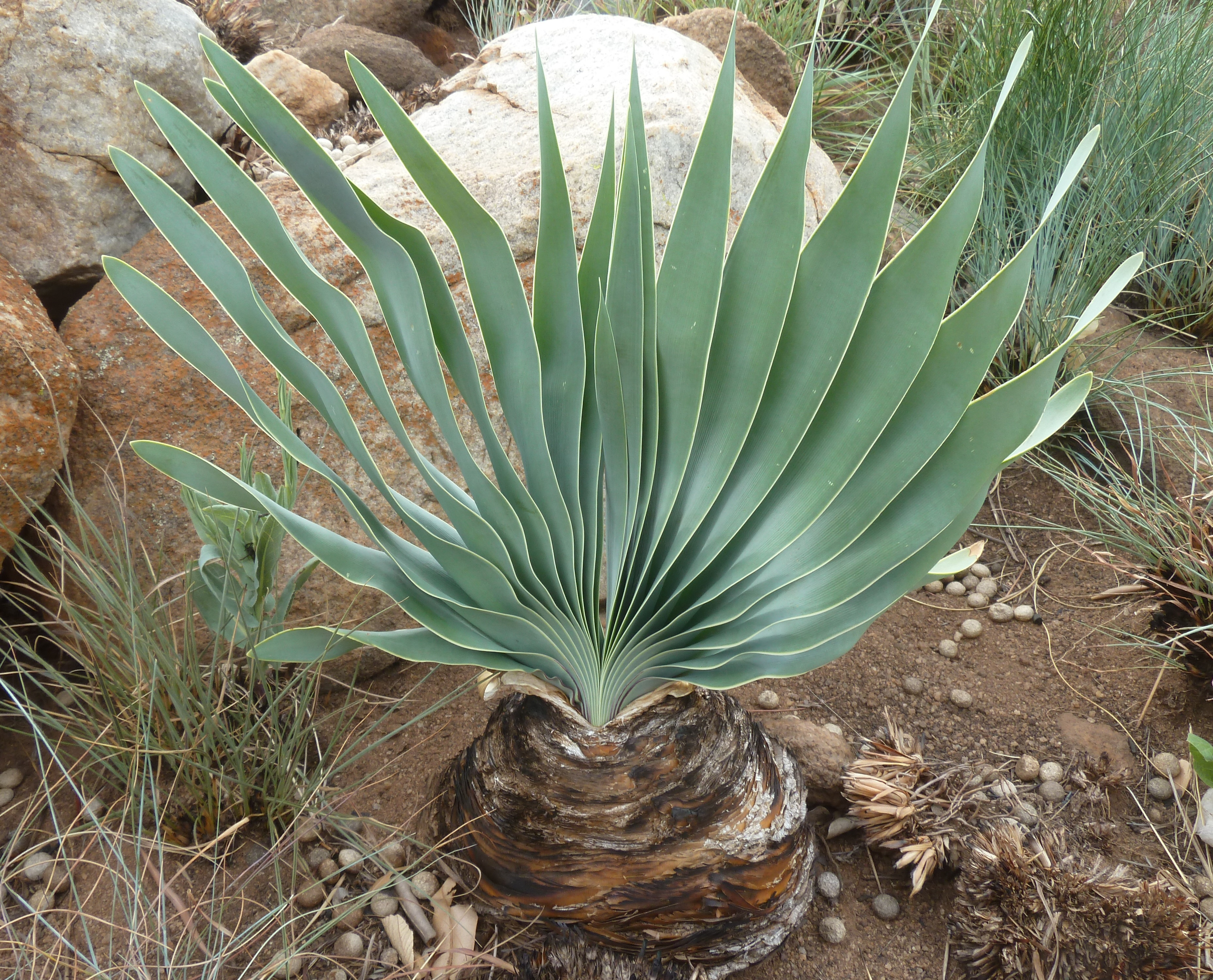
Boophone disticha has conspicuously distichous leaves.

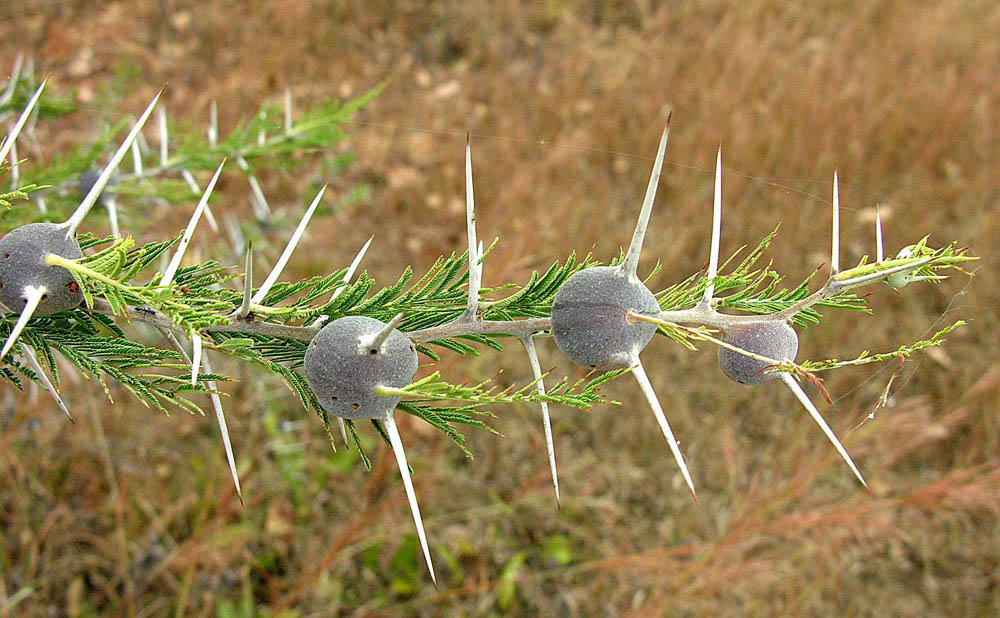
Domatia at the bases of the thorns of Vachellia drepanolobium, the whistling thorn, with visible access holes

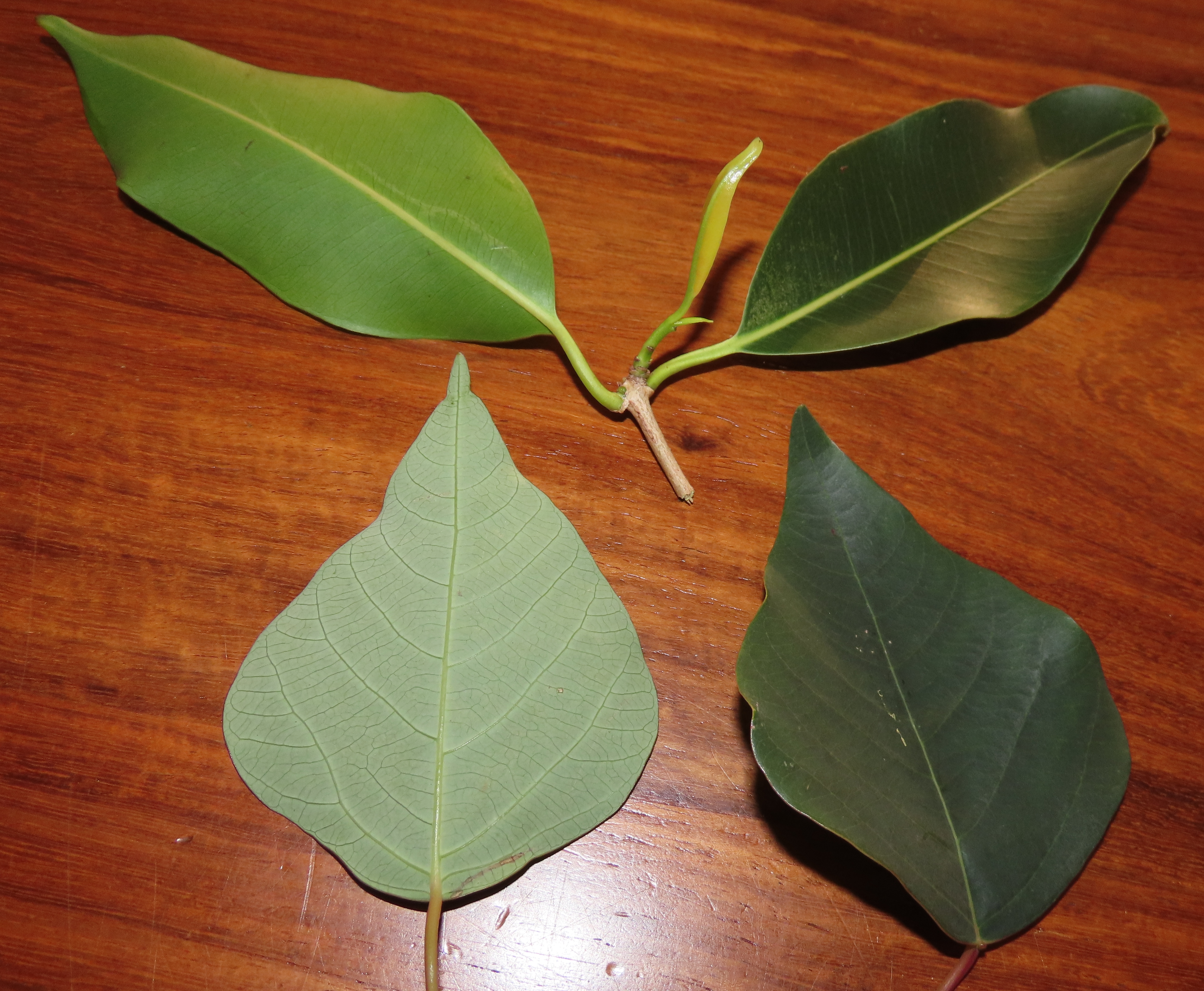
Dorsiventral (bilateral) leaves of Syzygium gerrardi and Triadica sebifera

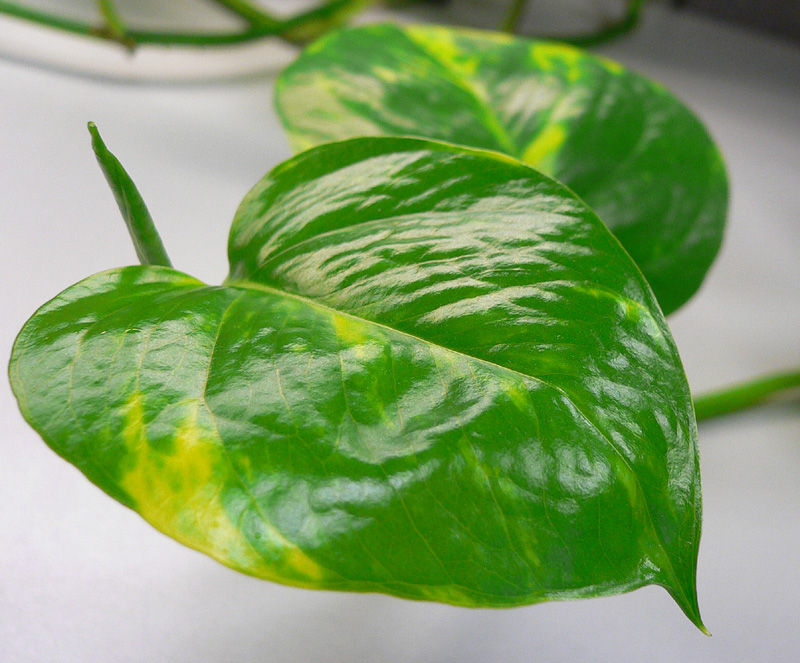
Leaves of Epipremnum aureum (golden pothos) have a cuspidate drip tip.

== E ==
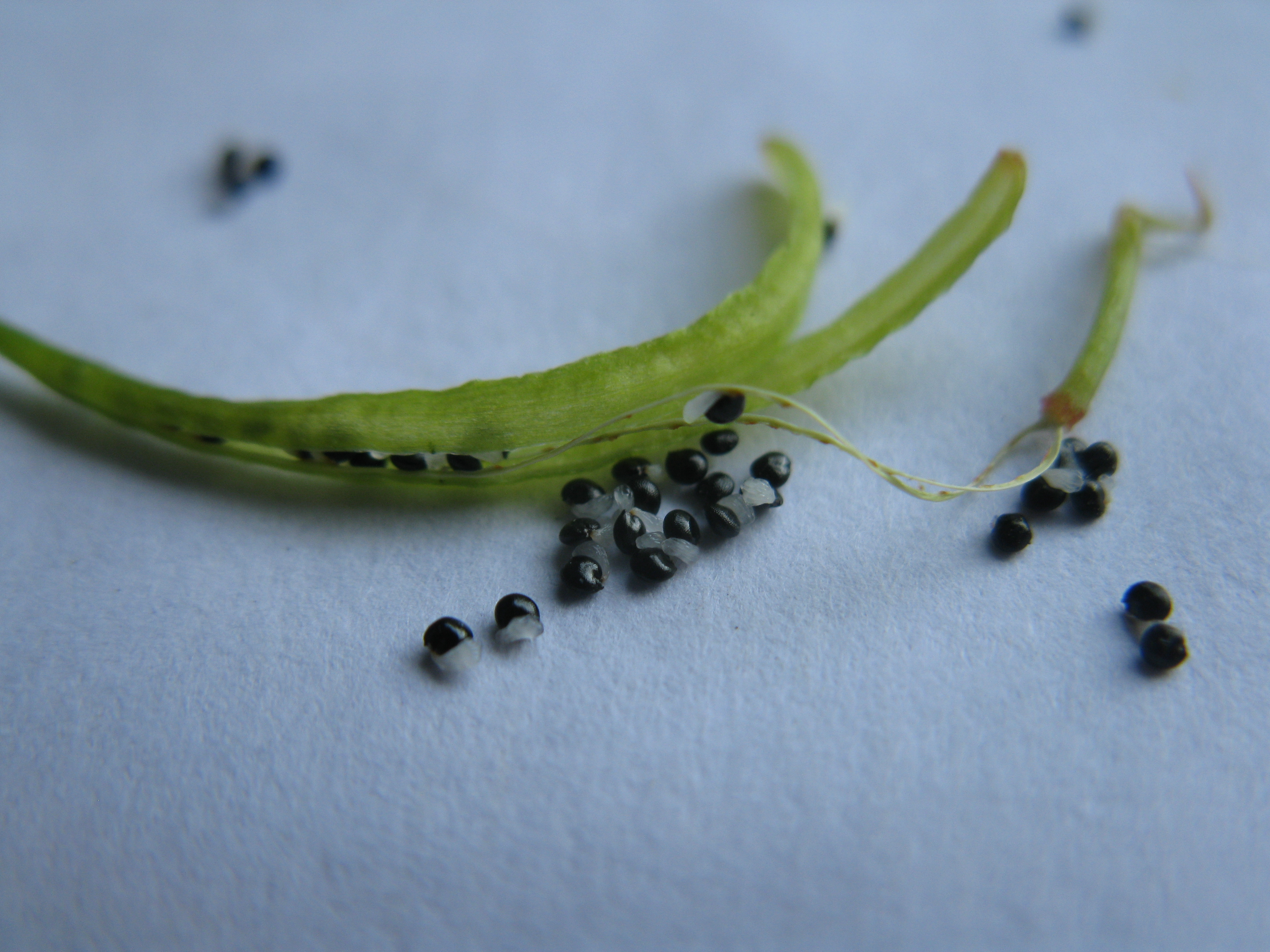
Plants of the genus Corydalis bear seeds with attached elaiosomes, which have various functions, commonly attracting ants. On some Corydalis species, elaiosomes that attract ants also repel mice.

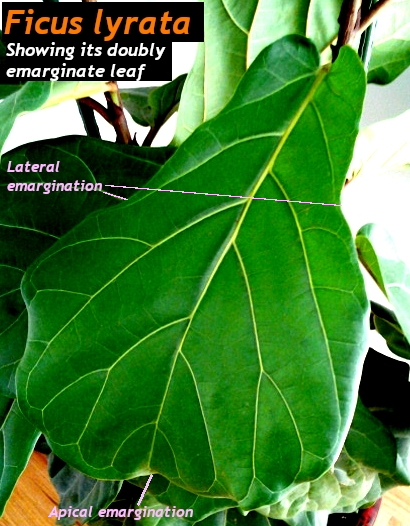
Ficus lyrata is an example of a doubly-emarginate leaf with lateral and apical emargination; it also might be seen as a basally emarginate.

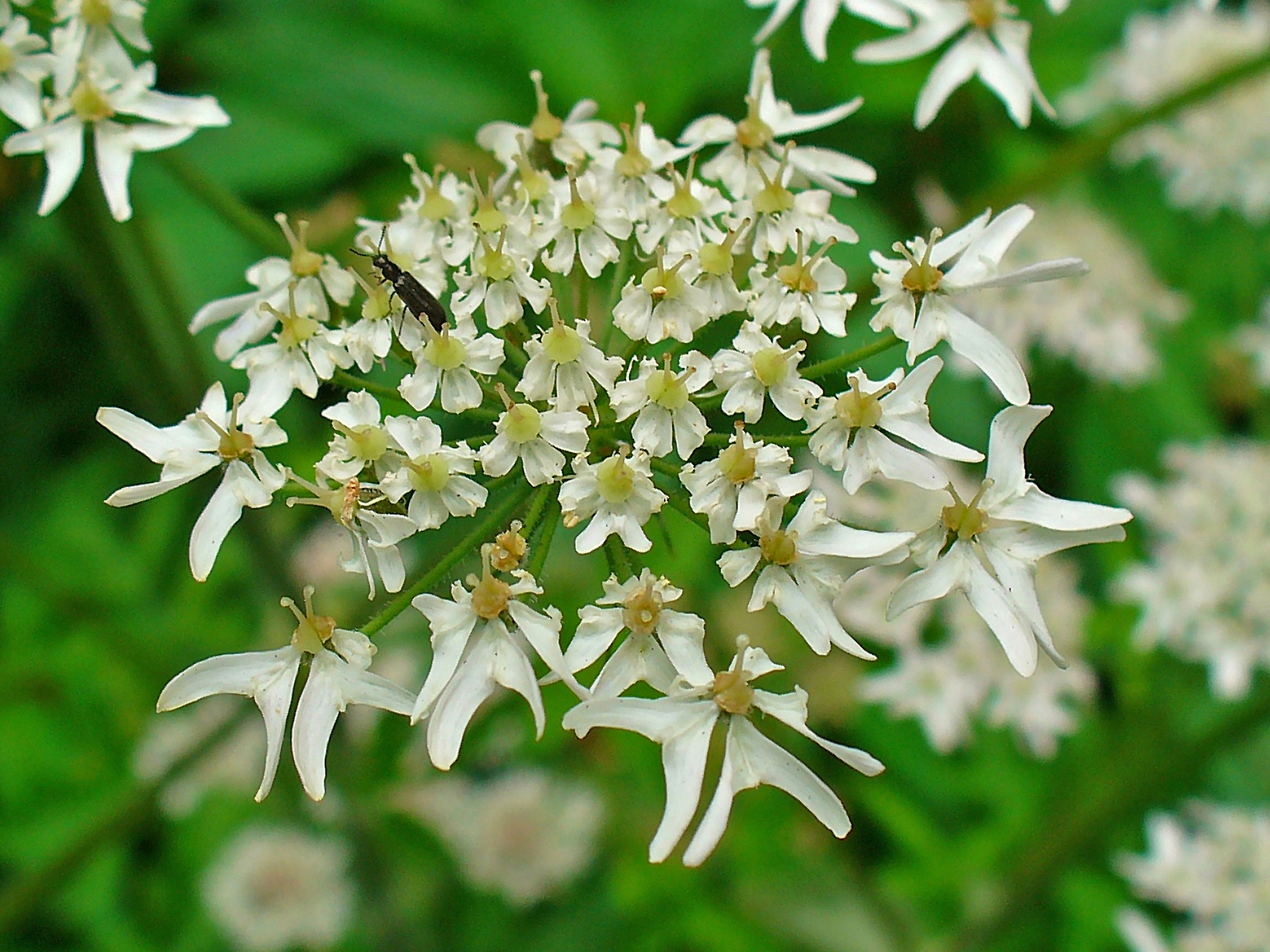
Petals of Heracleum sphondylium are variously emarginate at their tips. Flowers in the middle of the inflorescence have slightly emarginate petals, whereas flowers at the periphery are so deeply emarginate as to be almost cleft in two.

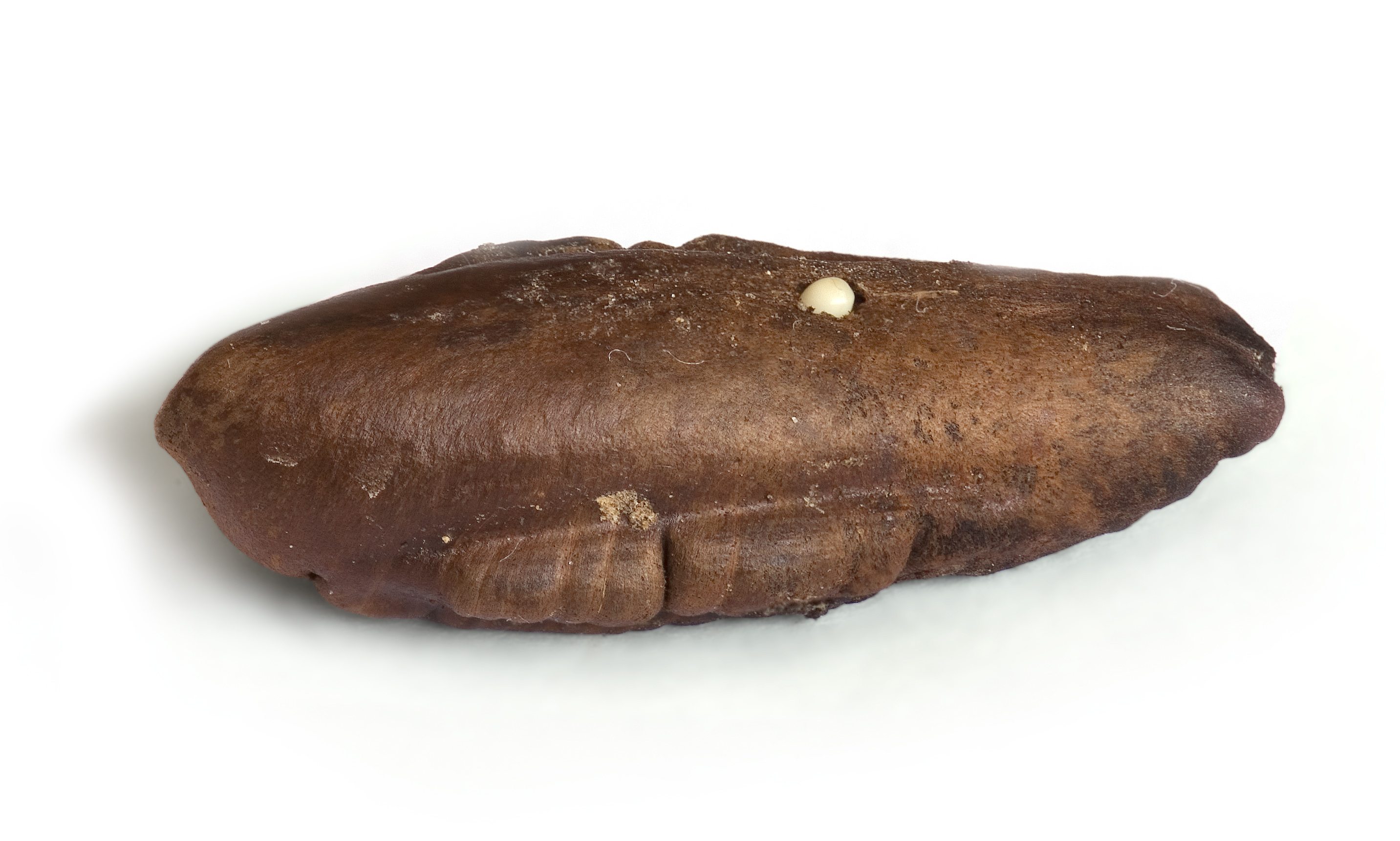
The pale embryo emerging from the upper surface of the sprouting date seed is tiny in comparison to the endosperm, its main food supply, which comprises almost all of the rest of the seed.

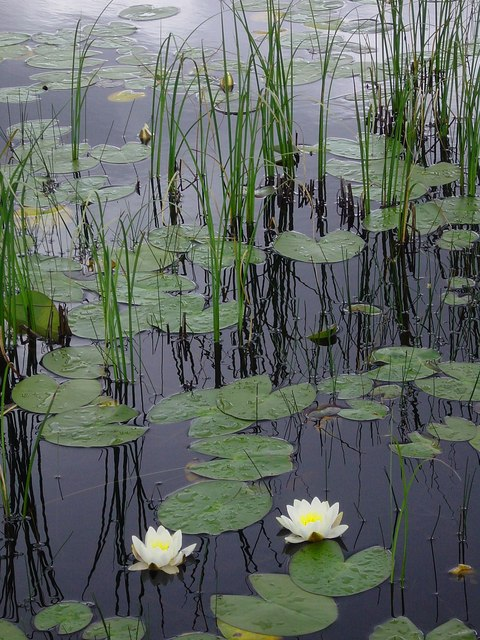
Water lilies and reeds represent two ecological categories of emergent aquatic vegetation.

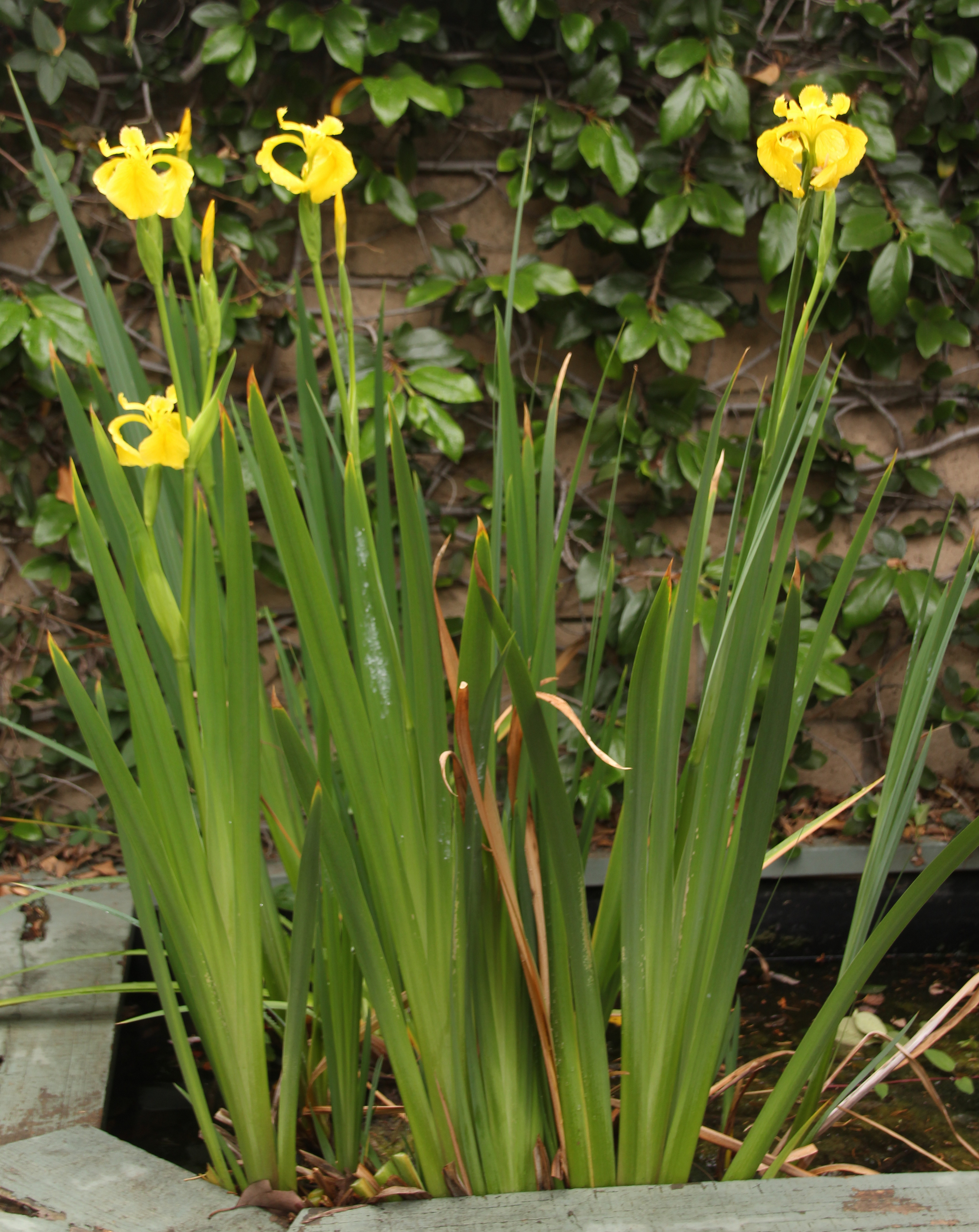
Iris pseudacorus has clearly ensiform leaves: narrow, straight-edged, sword-shaped.

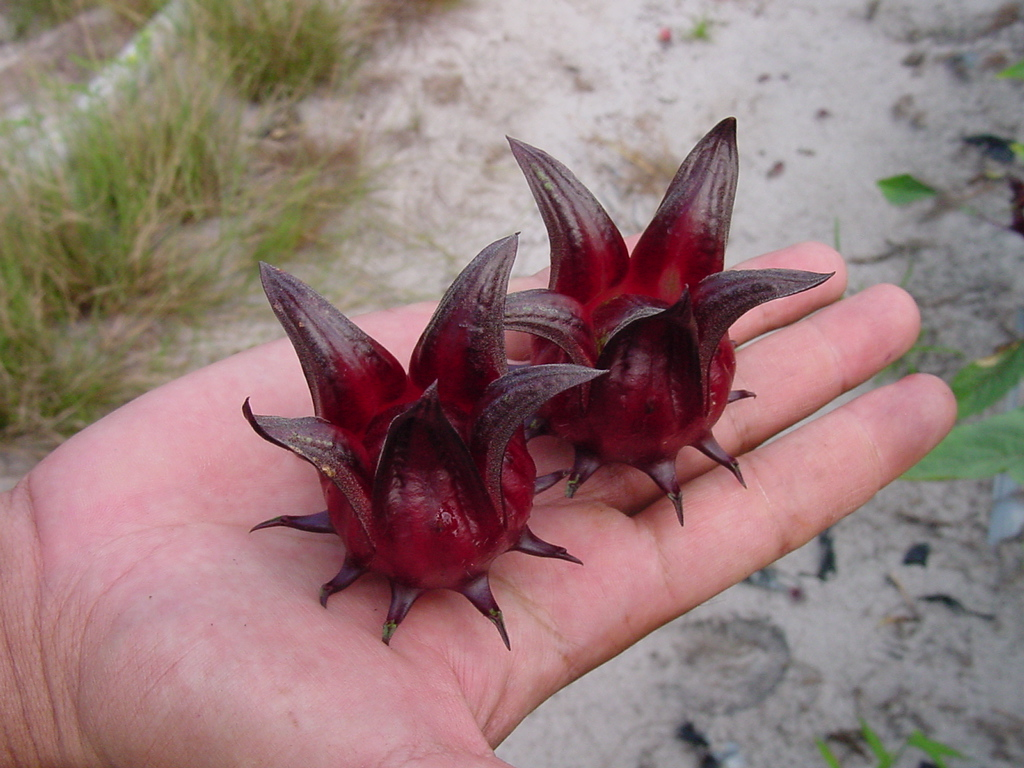
The enlarged calyx and smaller epicalyx of Hibiscus sabdariffa

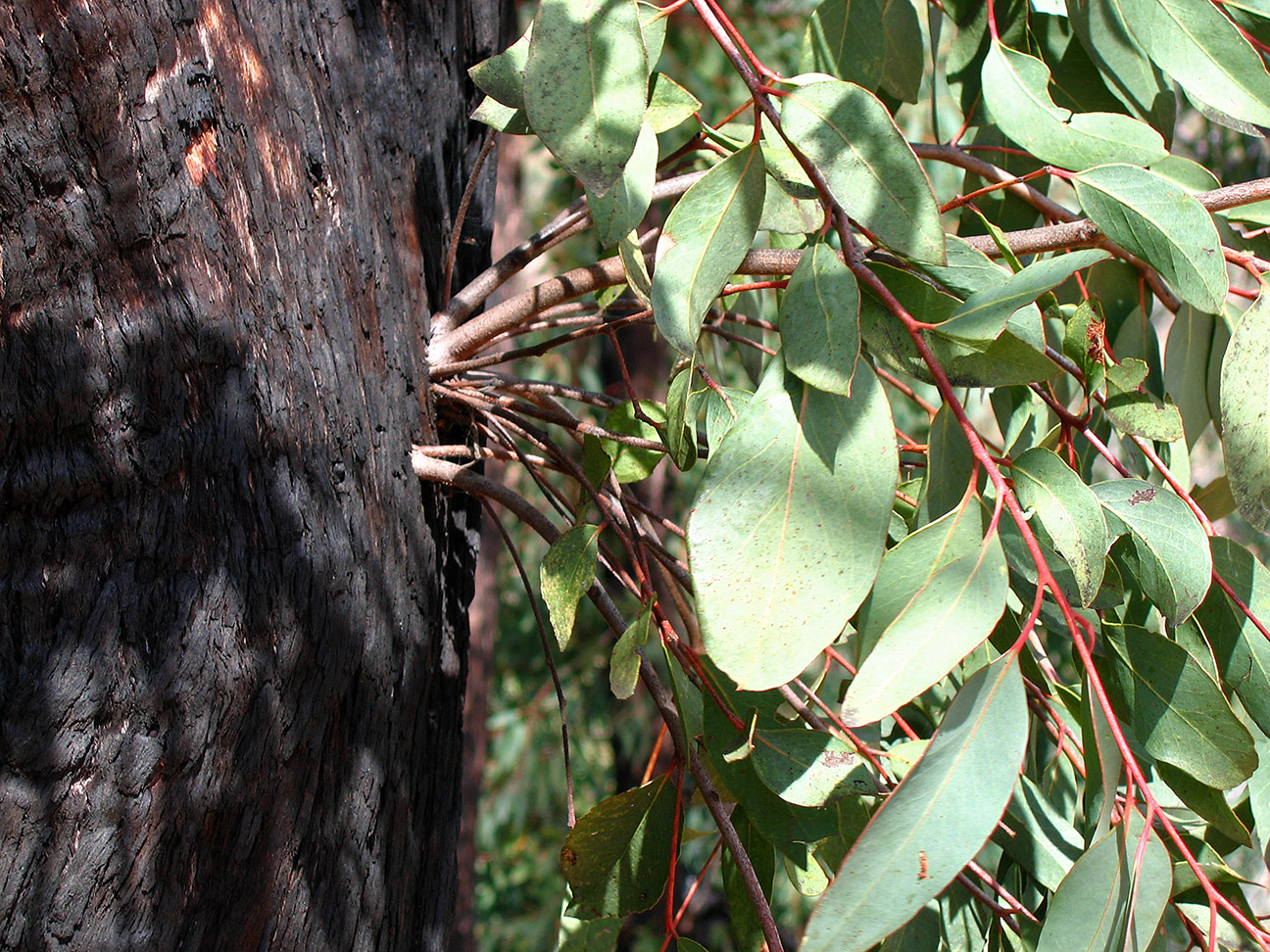
Shoots from epicormic buds on Eucalyptus following a bushfire

-eae
A suffix added to the stem of a generic name to form the name of a tribe, e.g. Aster → Astereae.
ebracteate
Lacking bracts; synonymous with ebracteolate.
ecological amplitude
The range of environmental conditions in which an organism can survive.
edaphic
Of or influenced by the soil.
eglandular

Not having glands.
elaiosome
An external structure attached to the seed of many species of plants. Elaiosomes generally look fleshy and in some species they are rich in oils or other nutritious materials. Their functions vary and are not always obvious; commonly they attract ants or other animals that aid in dispersal, but they may also repel other animals from eating the seed.
elephophily
A form of pollination whereby pollen or spores are distributed by the feet of elephants, as in Rafflesia arnoldii.
ellipsoid
A three-dimensional shape that is elliptical in all sections through the long axis.
elliptical

Planar, shaped like a flattened circle, symmetrical about both the long and the short axis, tapering equally both to the tip and the base; oval.
emarginate
Typically in reference to leaf margins: notched or recessed at some part of the edge, such as the apex; the recess usually is broad and shallow. The location of a leaf's emargination(s) might be one or more of apical, lateral or basal
embryo
The young plant contained by a seed prior to germination.
emergent
A plant taller than the surrounding vegetation or, among aquatic plant species, one that bears flowers and commonly leaves above the surface of the water. Aquatic examples include water lilies, reeds, and papyrus. Some pondweeds such as Stuckenia are not emergent until they flower, at which time only their flowers appear above the water surface.
enation
Leaf-like outgrowth from a surface.
enantiostyly
The condition in which the gynoecium protrudes laterally, to the right (dextrostyly) or to the left (sinistrostyly) of the androecium, e.g. Senna.
endemic
Having a natural distribution restricted to a particular geographic region. Compare native.
endocarp
The innermost layer of the wall of a fruit; in a drupe, the stony layer surrounding the seed.
endodermis
The innermost layer of the cortex of vascular plant roots, also present in the stems of pteridophytes. The radial walls are impregnated with suberin to form a permeability barrier known as the Casparian strip.
endosperm
1. (angiosperms) A nutritive tissue surrounding the embryo of the seed, usually triploid, originating from the fusion of both polar nuclei with one gamete after the fertilization of the egg.
2. (gymnosperms) The prothallus within the embryo sac.
endospory
The production of spores that germinate into a reduced multicellular gametophyte contained within the spore wall. Contrast exospory.
ensiform
Shaped like the blade of a sword.
entire
1. Not divided.
2. (of a margin) Smooth and not lobed or toothed (though possibly wavy or scalloped). See also entire in Glossary of leaf morphology
entomophily
A form of pollination whereby pollen or spores are distributed by insects.
epecophyte
Species of recent appearance, usually numerous and constant in the country, but confined to artificial habitats, such as meadows and ruderal vegetation and are dependent on humans for existence.
ephemeral
Short-lived. See also caducous.
epicalyx
An involucre resembling an outer calyx, e.g. as in Hibiscus. Made of small bract-like leaflets called episepals.
epicarp
The outer layer of the wall of a fruit, i.e. the "skin".
epicormic
Used to refer to buds, shoots, or flowers developing from the old wood of trees, especially after injury or fire.
epicotyl
The part of the plant axis or stem between the cotyledonary node and the first foliage leaves.
epicuticular wax
A layer of crystalline or amorphous wax deposited on the surface of the cuticle.
epidermis
An organ's outermost layer of cells, usually only one cell thick.
epigynous
Borne on the ovary; describes floral parts when attached above the level of the ovary and arising from tissue fused to the ovary wall. Compare hypogynous and perigynous.
epilithic
Growing on stone. Compare lithophytic, a plant growing on stone.
epipetalous
Of stamens that are attached to the petals.
epipetric
Growing on rock or stone, lithophytic, epilithic.
epiphloeodal
Growing on the surface of bark. Contrast endophloeodal (growing inside, not on, the bark) and epilithic (growing on rock, not bark).
epiphyte
A plant, alga or fungus that grows on another plant without deriving nourishment from it but using it for support.
epiphytic
Of an epiphyte; living on the surface of a plant. Compare epilithic, lithophytic.
episepal
Small bract-like leaflets that make up an extra calyx (epicalyx) located below the true calyx
episepalous
Of stamens that are attached to the sepals.
epitepalous
Of stamens that are attached to the tepals.
epithet
The adjectival component in a binomial scientific name, usually more specifically called a specific epithet; the final word or combination of words in a name of more than one word (other than a term denoting rank) that denominates an individual taxon. The simplest and commonest example is the second word in a two-word name of a species, such as "mirabilis" in Welwitschia mirabilis.
epizoochory
A type of seed dispersal that occurs when seeds or fruits physically adhere to the outside of vertebrate animal bodies.
epruinose
Not pruinose.
equitant
(of a leaf) Folded lengthwise and clasping another leaf.
erect
Upright, more or less perpendicular to the ground or point of attachment. Compare patent (spreading) and erecto-patent, between erect and patent.
ericoid
Having leaves like those of the European heaths (Erica); small and sharply pointed.
erose
(of a margin) Irregular as though nibbled or worn away.
ethelochoric
Deliberate introduction by seedlings, seeds or plants in a new habitat by humans.
etiolation
Weak growth due to lack of light, resulting in elongated stems and yellowish color.
even-pinnate
Having an even number of leaflets in a compound leaf; synonymous with paripinnate.
evergreen
Not deciduous; having leaves all year.
ex
In nomenclature, indicating that the preceding author proposed the name but did not legitimately publish it, and that the succeeding author referred to the first author when legitimately publishing the name. See Author citation (botany).
exalbuminous
In seeds of a given species, having no endosperm, i.e. no albumen, e.g. in Fabaceae and Combretaceae.
exocarp
The outer layer of the pericarp, often the skin of fleshy fruits.
exospory
The production of spores that germinate into free-living multicellular gametophytes. Contrast endospory.
exotesta
The outer layer of the testa (seed coat). It is derived from the outer integument of the ovule.
exotic
Not native; introduced from another region or country.
exserted
Projected beyond, e.g. stamens beyond the corolla tube.
exstipulate
Lacking stipules.
extrastaminal
Outside the stamens or androecium, usually referring to the location of a nectary disk.
extrorse
(of anther locules) Opening toward the outside of the flower. Contrast introrse and latrorse.
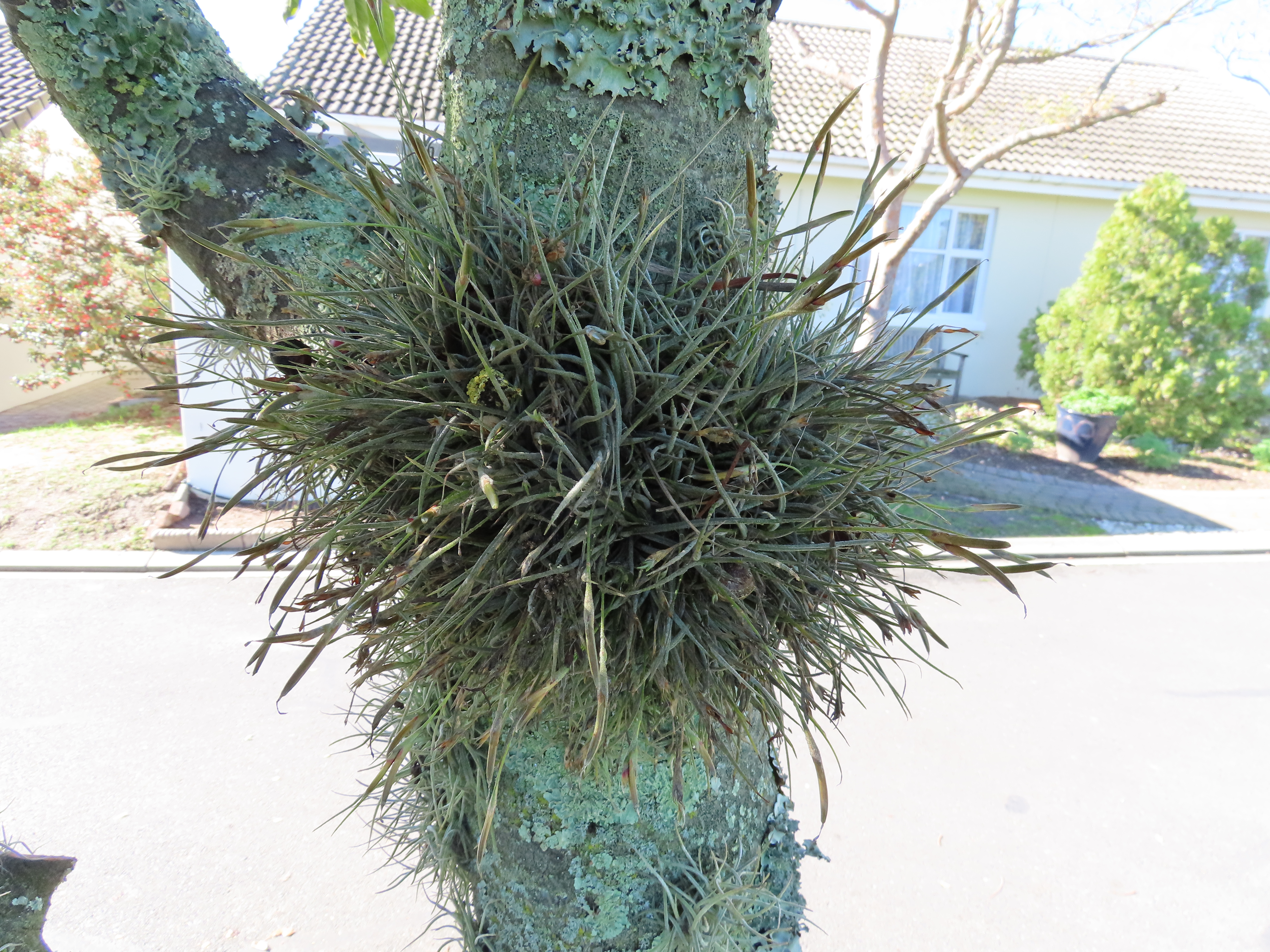
Tillandsia recurvata growing as a harmless, non-parasitic epiphloedal epiphyte on a tree trunk that it shares with epiphloedal foliose lichens

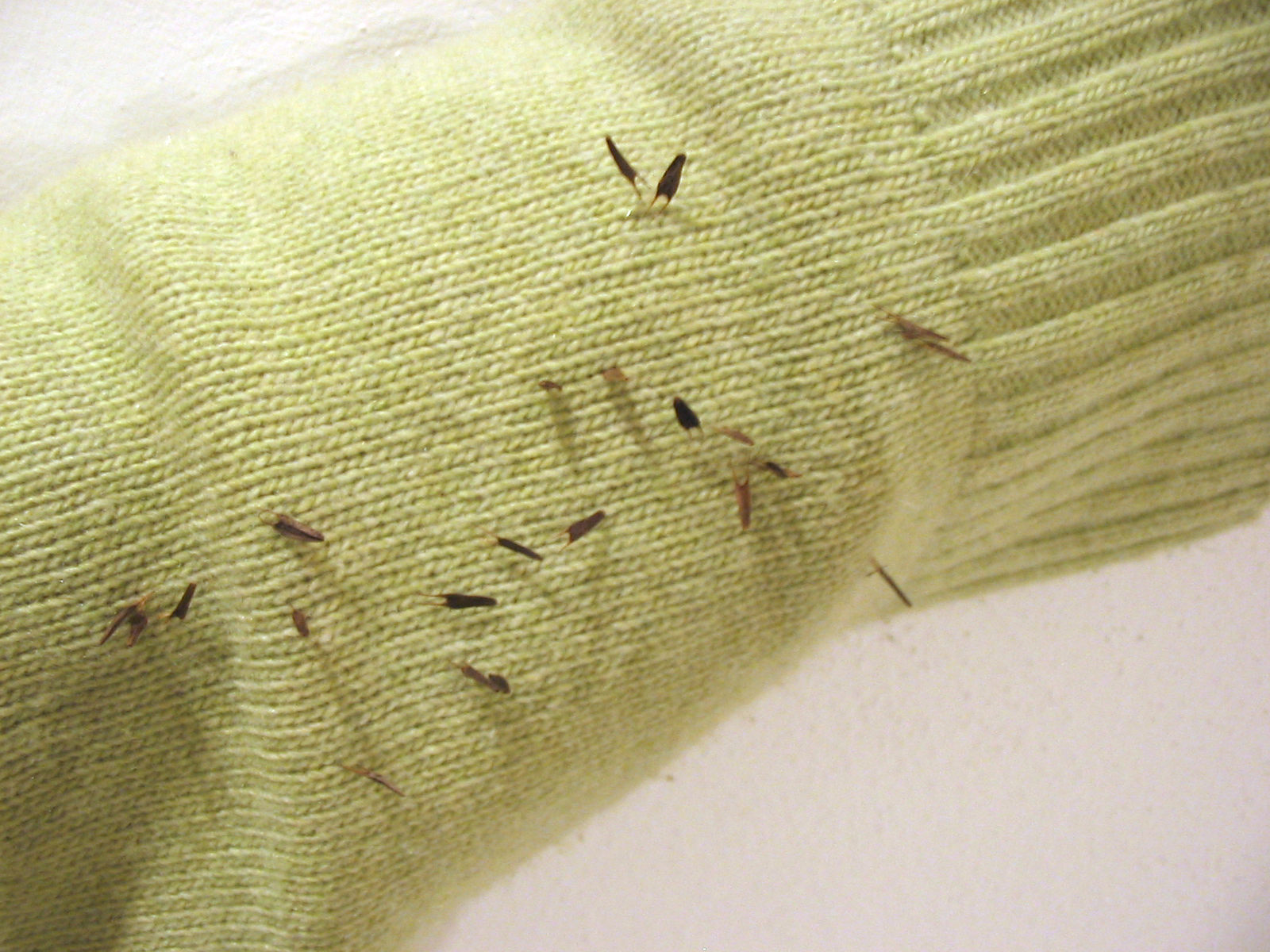
Seeds or fruit are dispersed by epizoochory when they stick to the fur of animals.

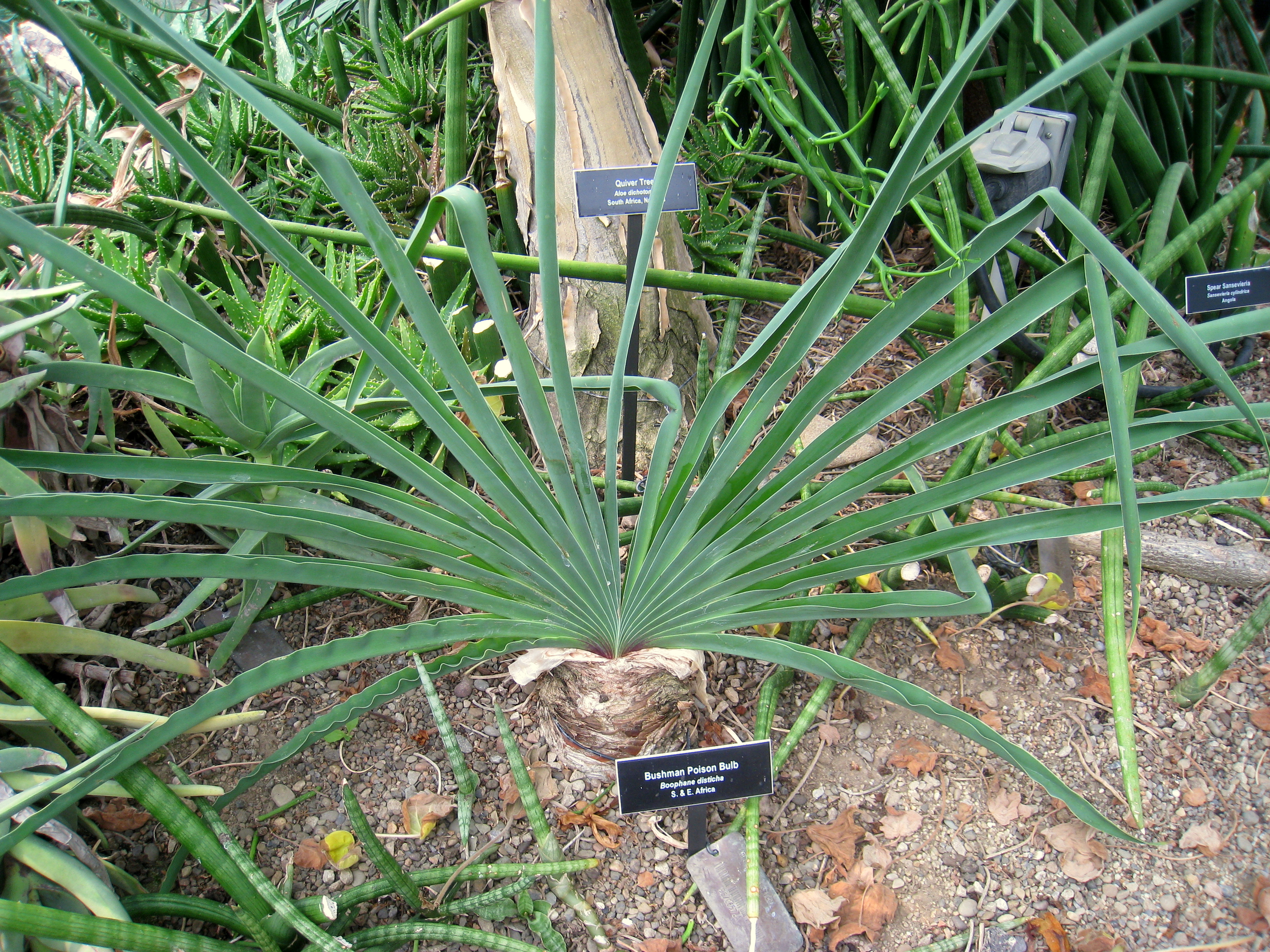
The bases of equitant leaves enclose later leaves on the stem.

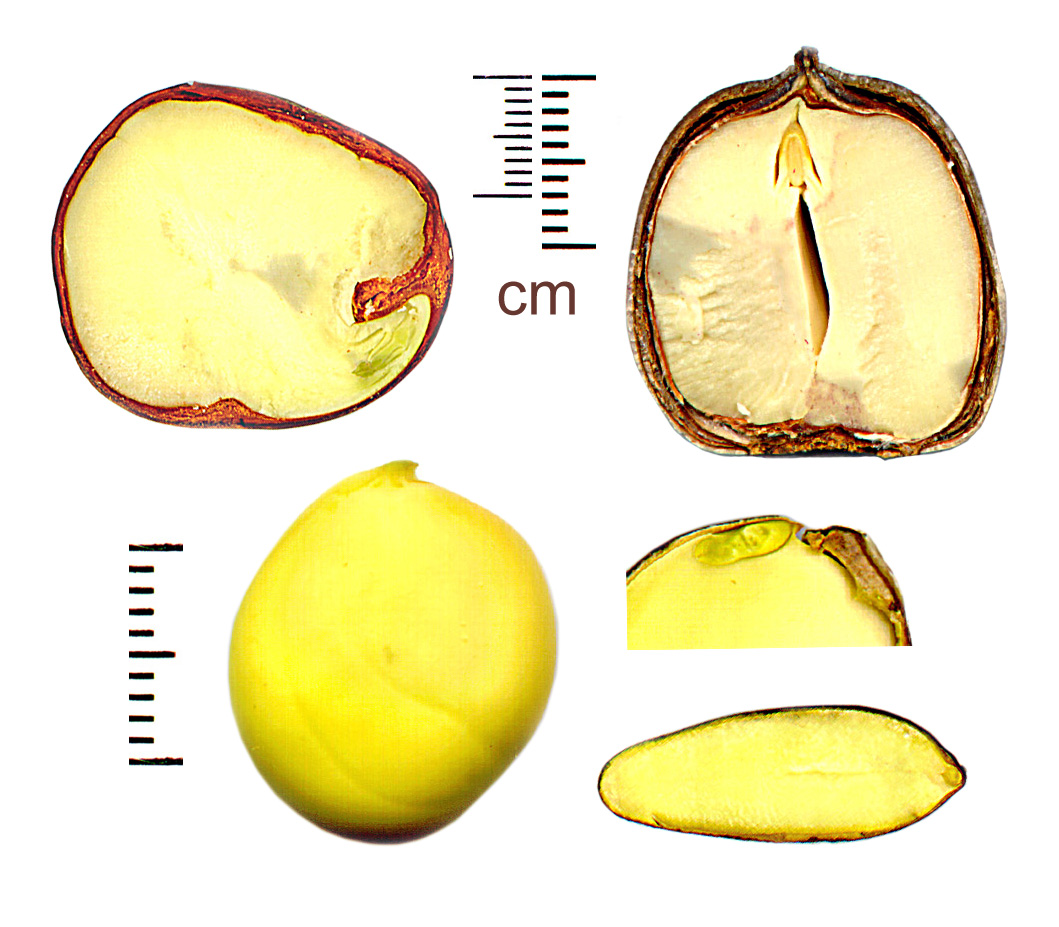
Sections of exalbuminous seeds

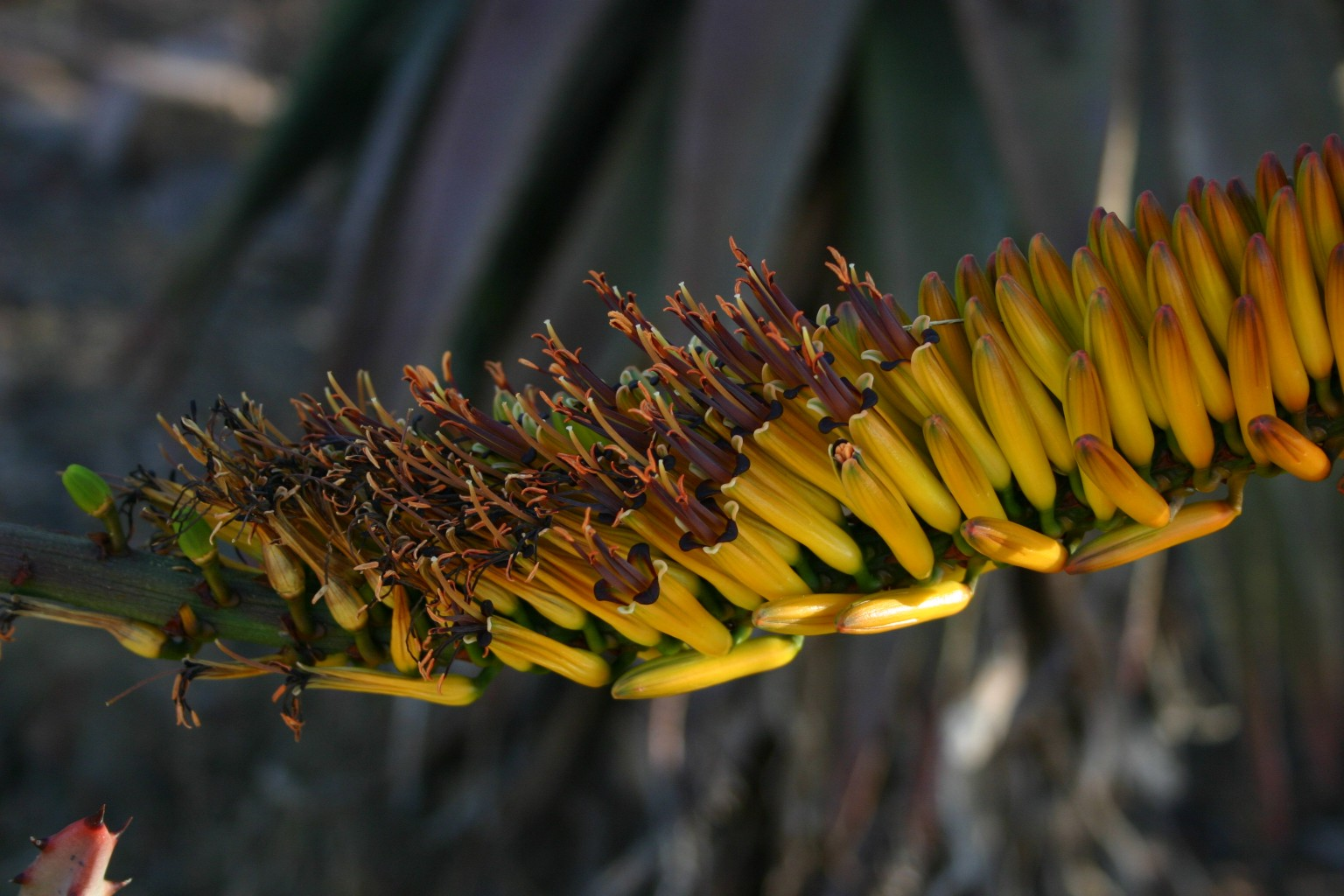
Aloe marlothii flowers with stamens and stigmata of mature flowers exserted from the mouths of the floral tubes

== F ==
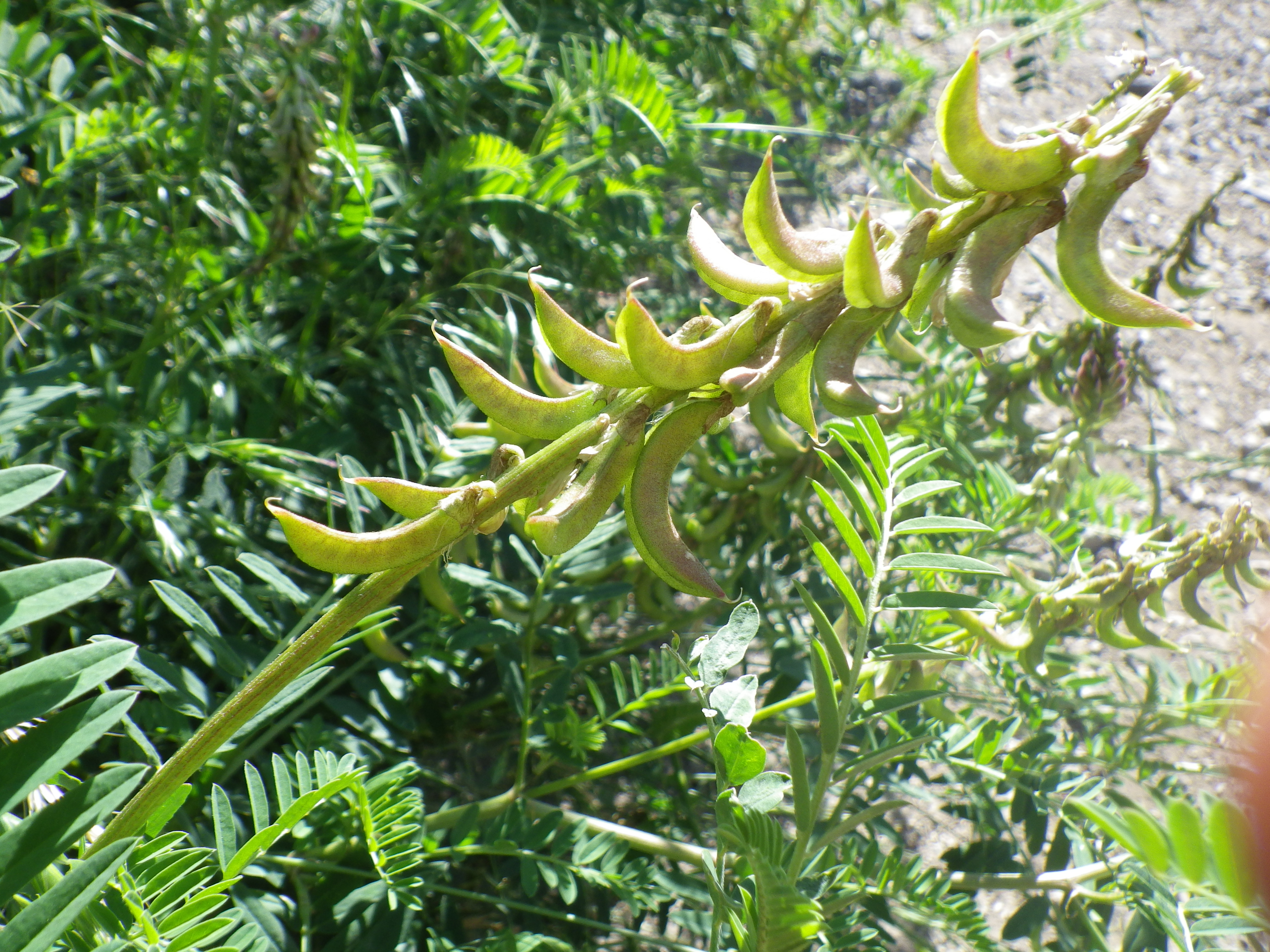
Astragalus falcatus has conspicuously falcate pods; not many falcate anatomical structures are so markedly curved.

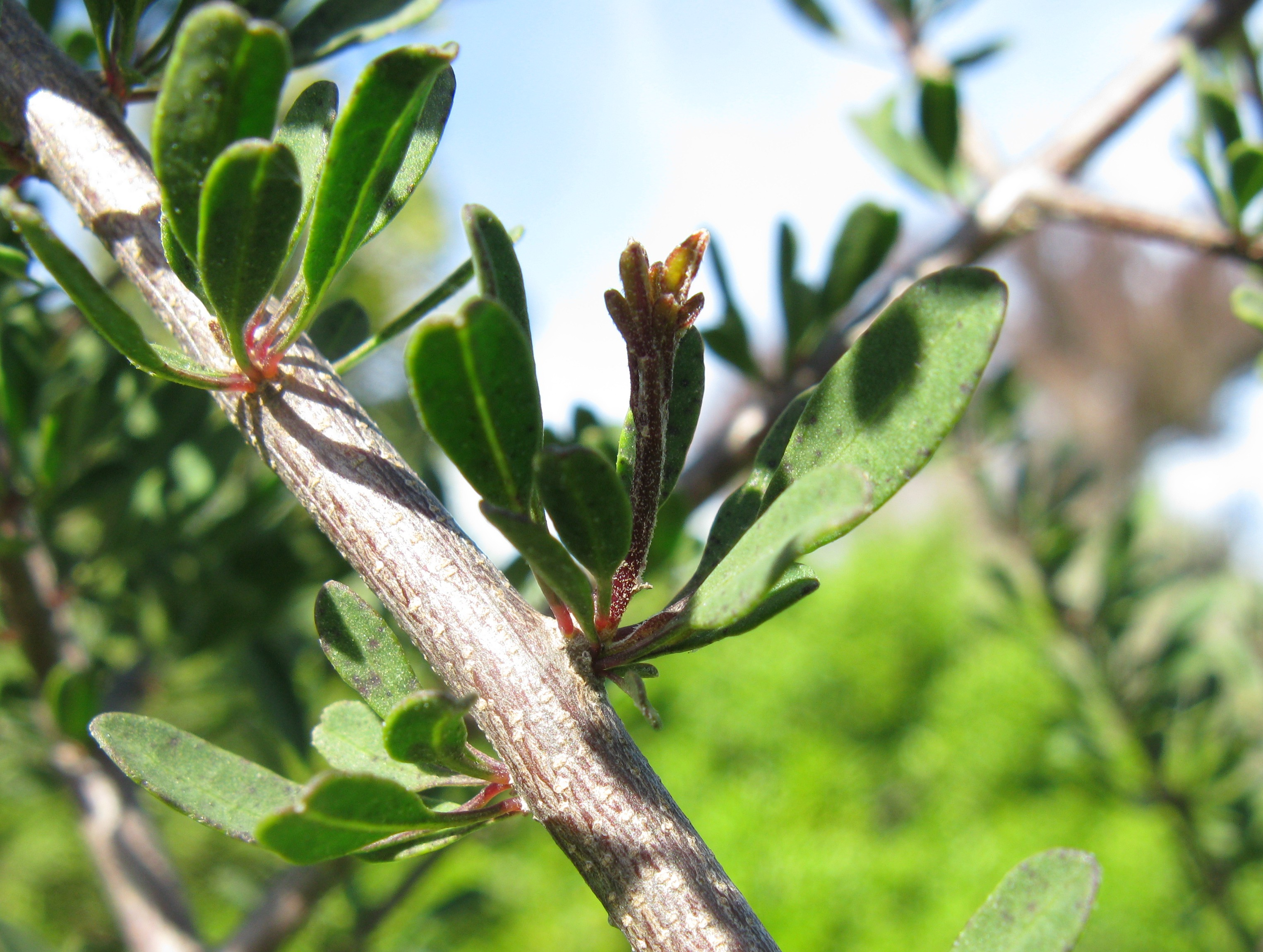
Rhigozum obovatum bears its leaves in well-defined fascicles.

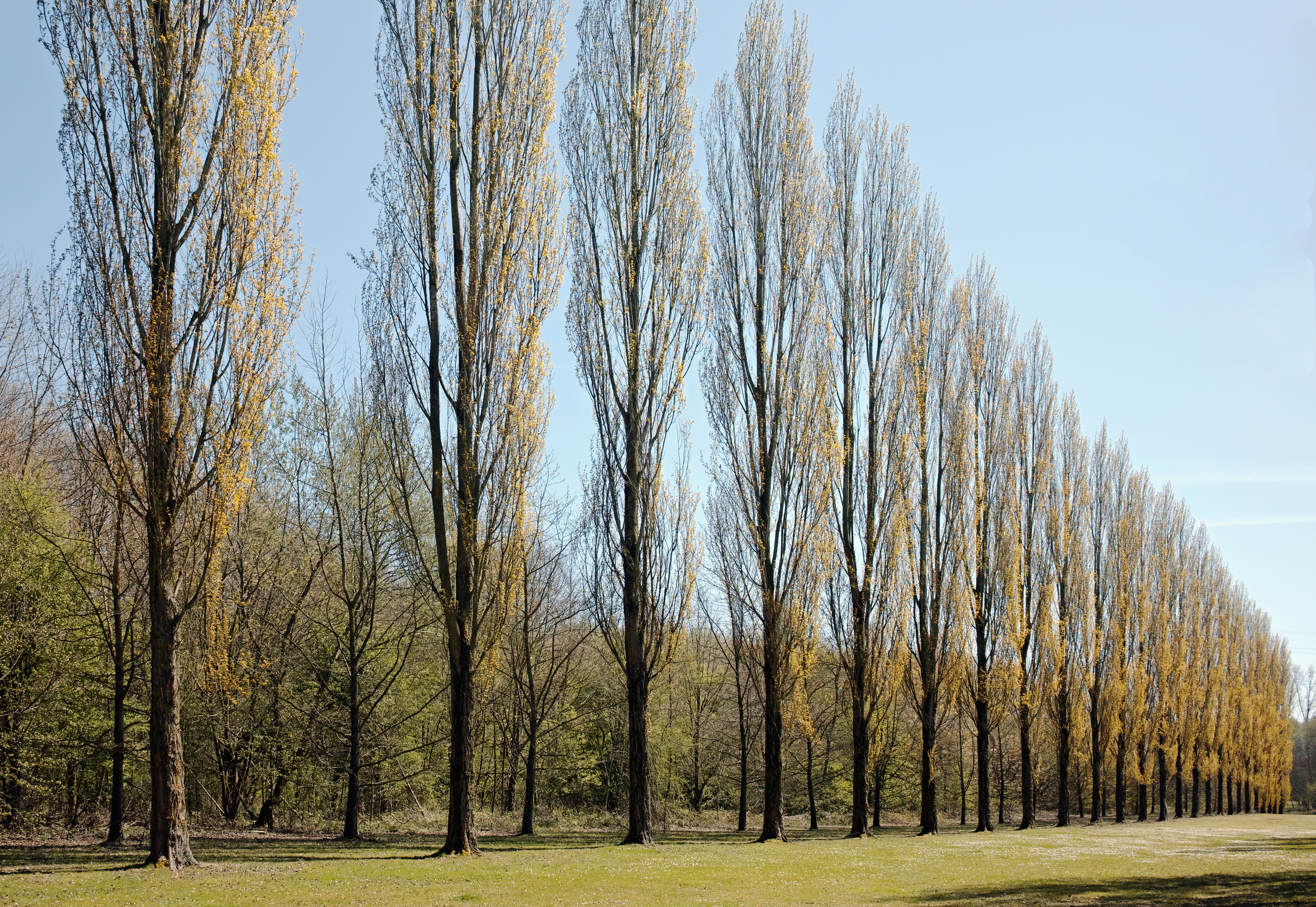
Trunks and branches of some species of poplars contribute to the trees' fastigiate habit.

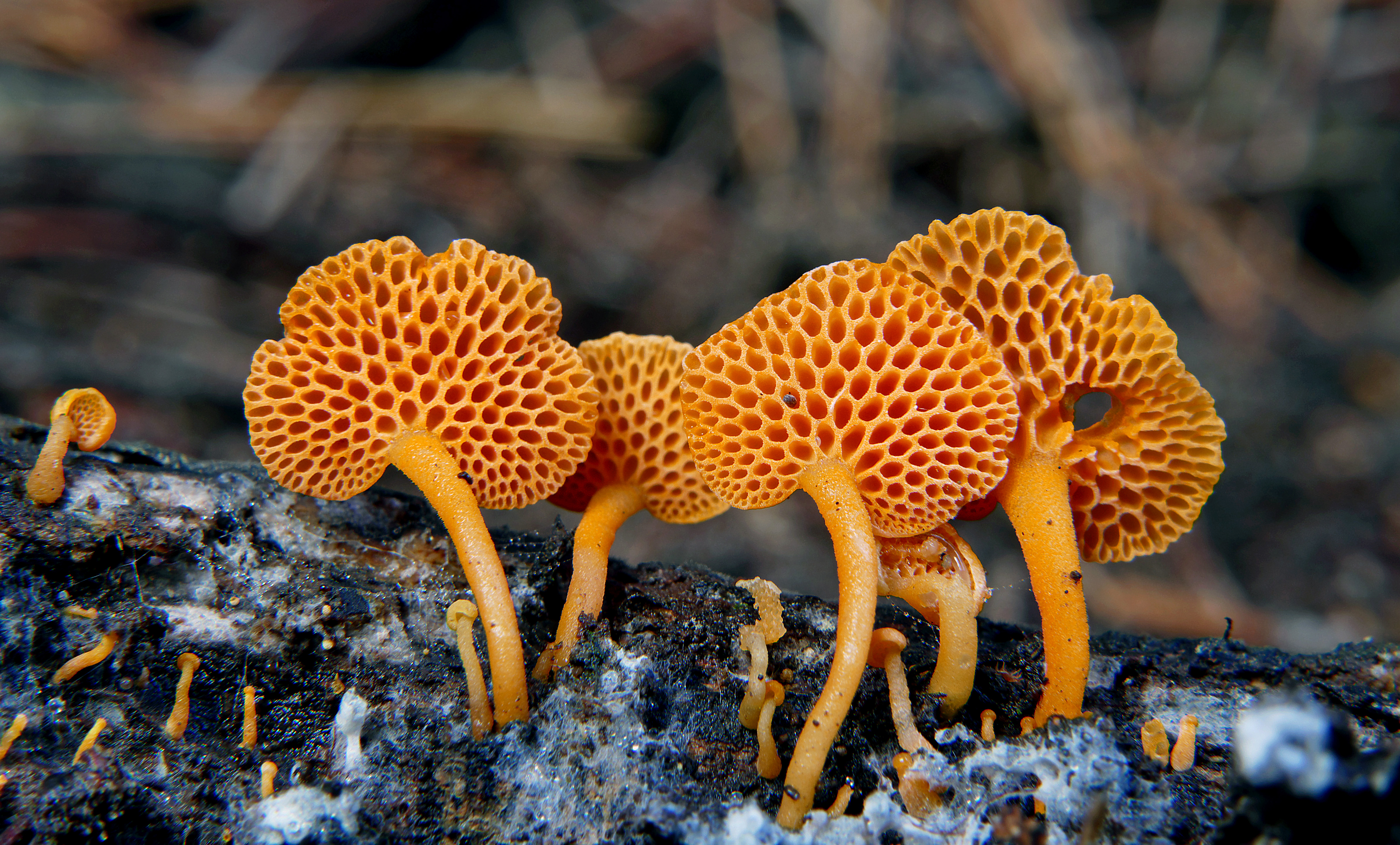
Favolaschia calocera, the orange pore fungus, has conspicuously faveolate fruiting bodies.

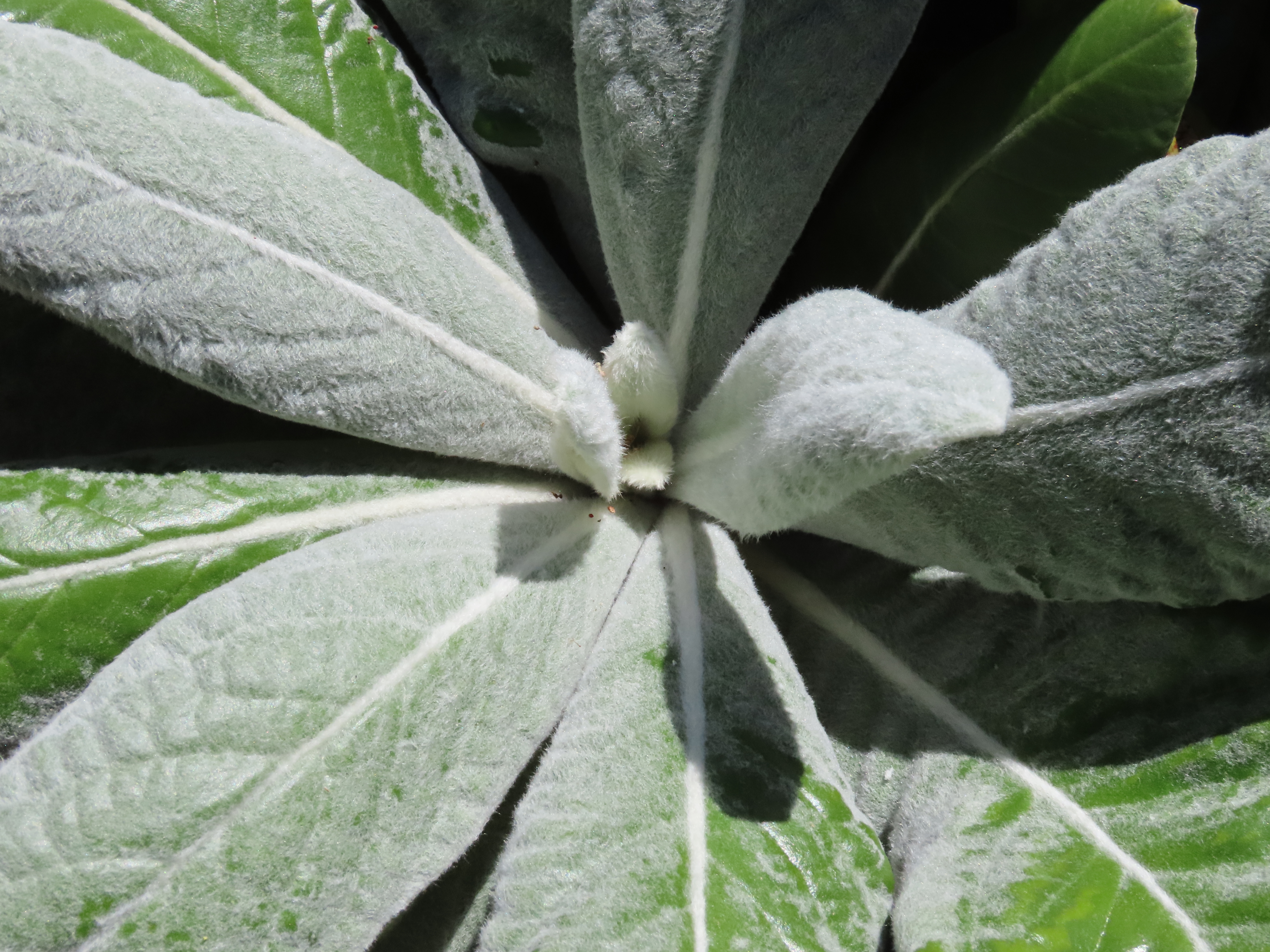
Emerging leaves of Oldenburgia grandis are heavily felted.

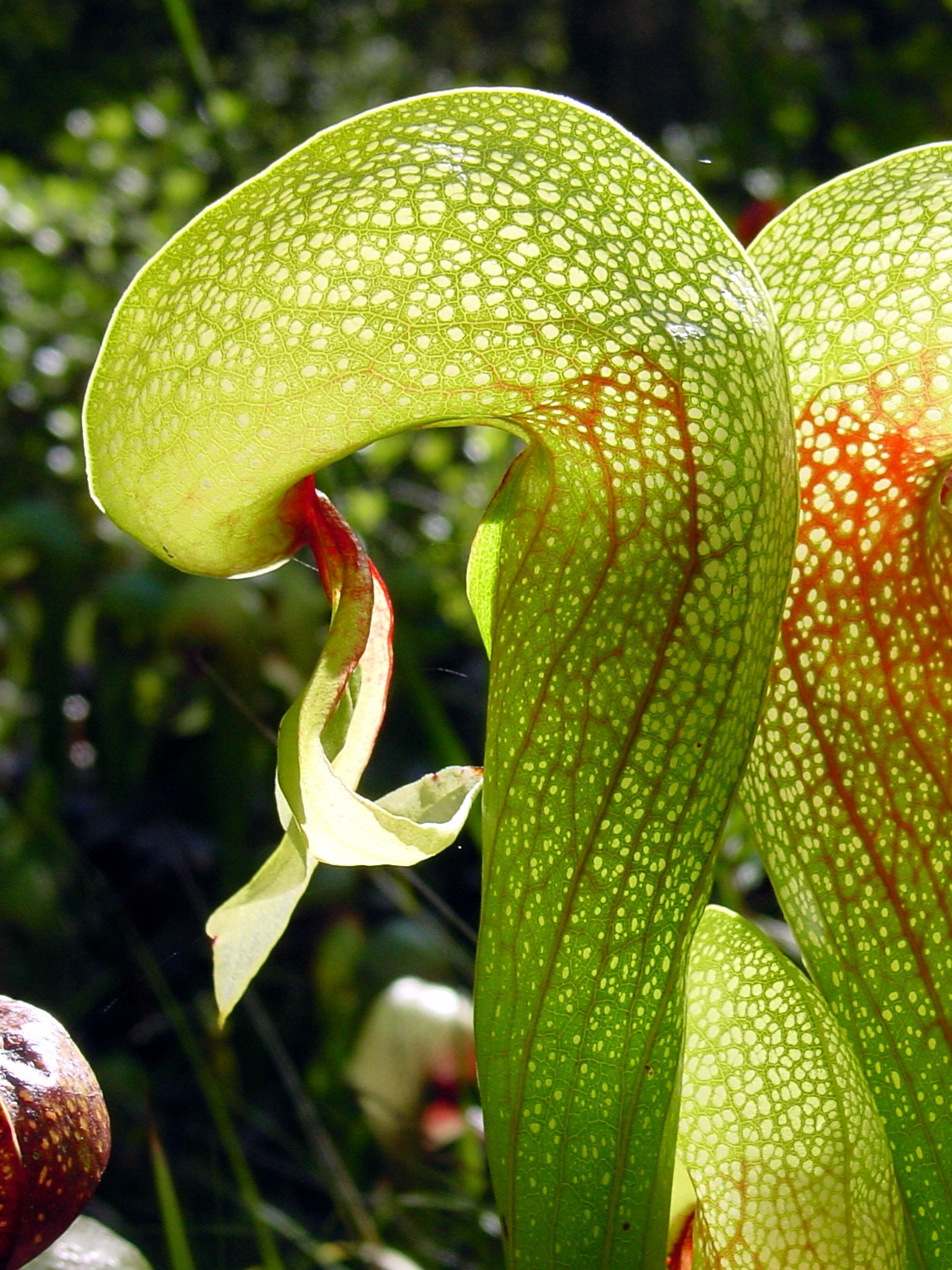
Fenestrate leaves of Darlingtonia californica

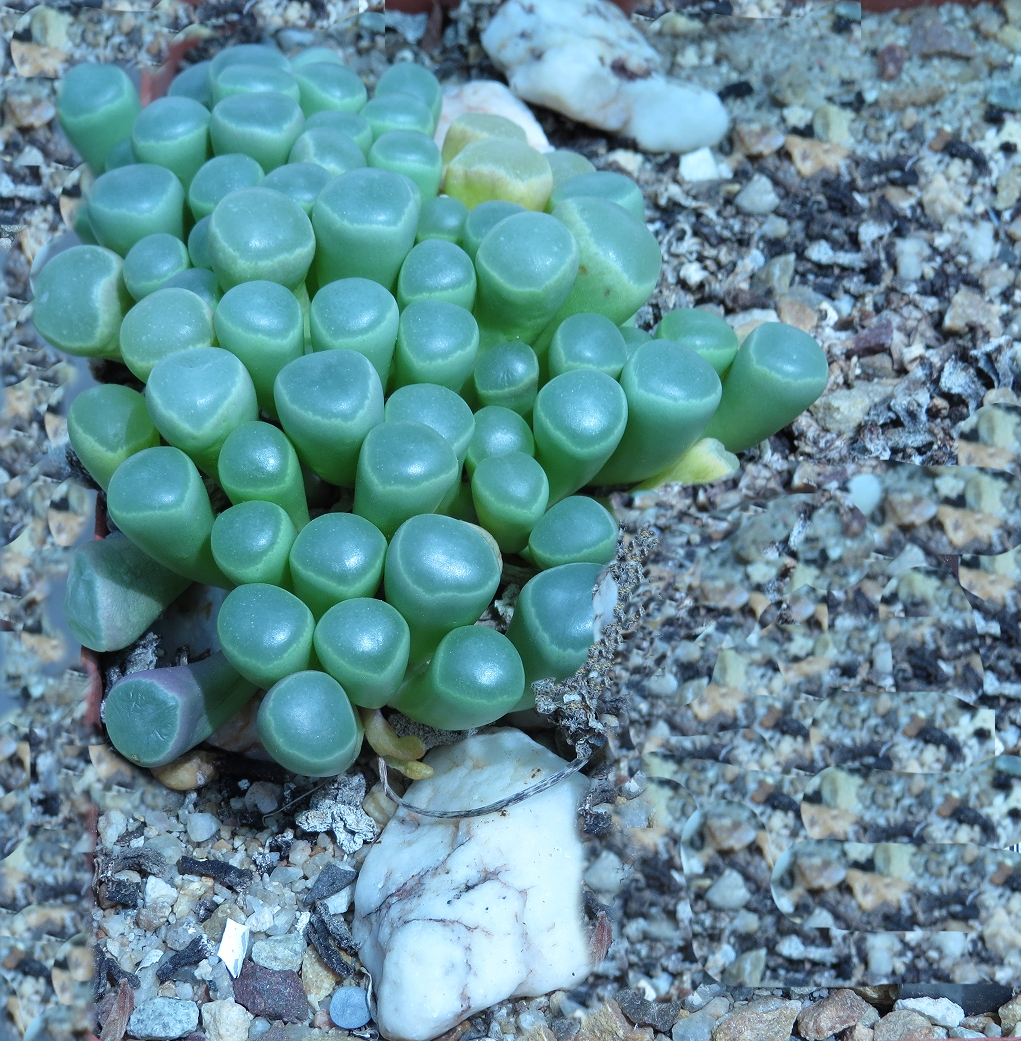
In the wild, the leaves of Fenestraria commonly are covered in soil, except for the transparent fenestration; this permits photosynthesis while reducing damage from exposure to intense sunlight and herbivores.

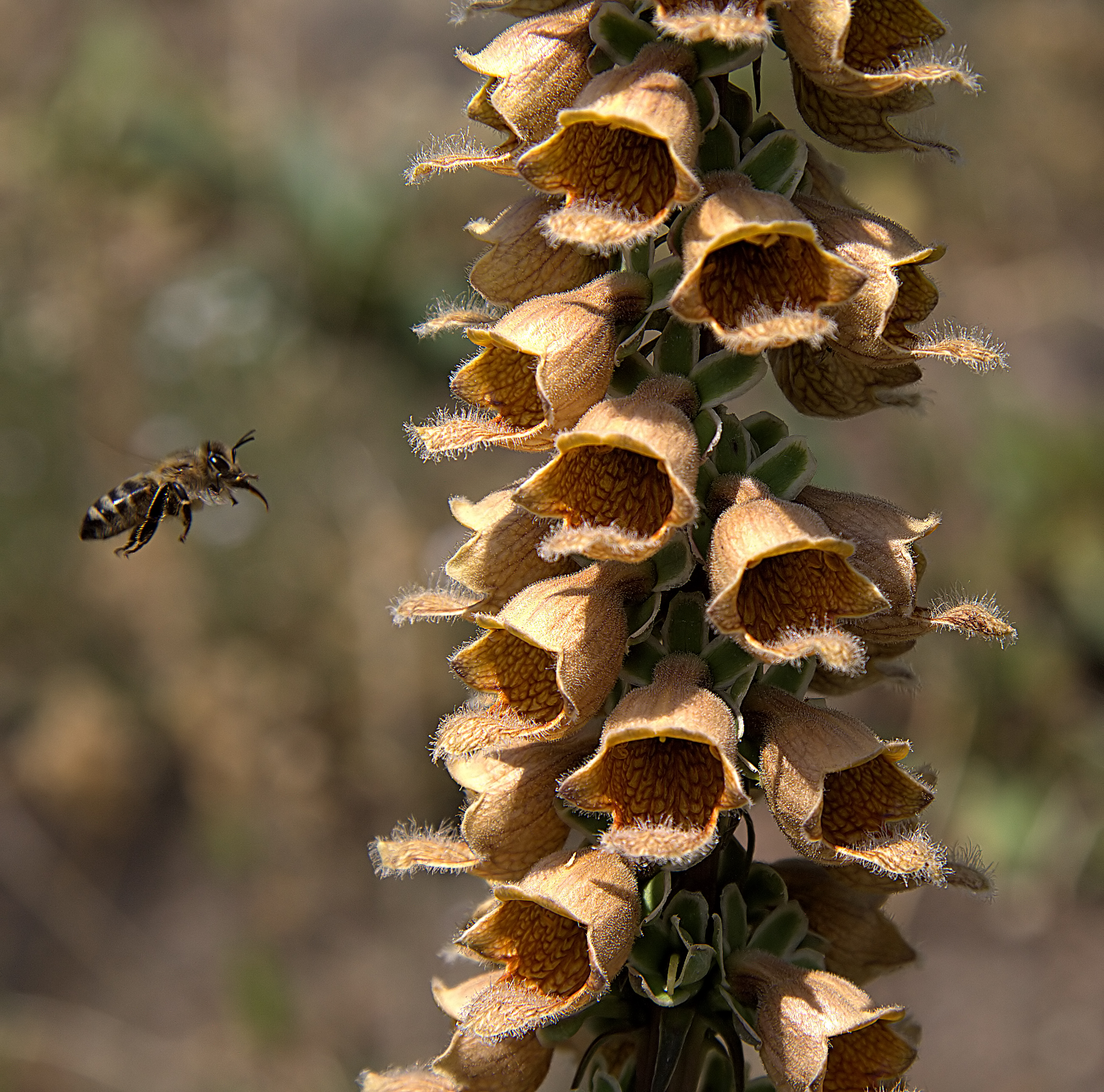
Digitalis ferruginea owes its specific name to its ferruginous (rust-colored) flowers.

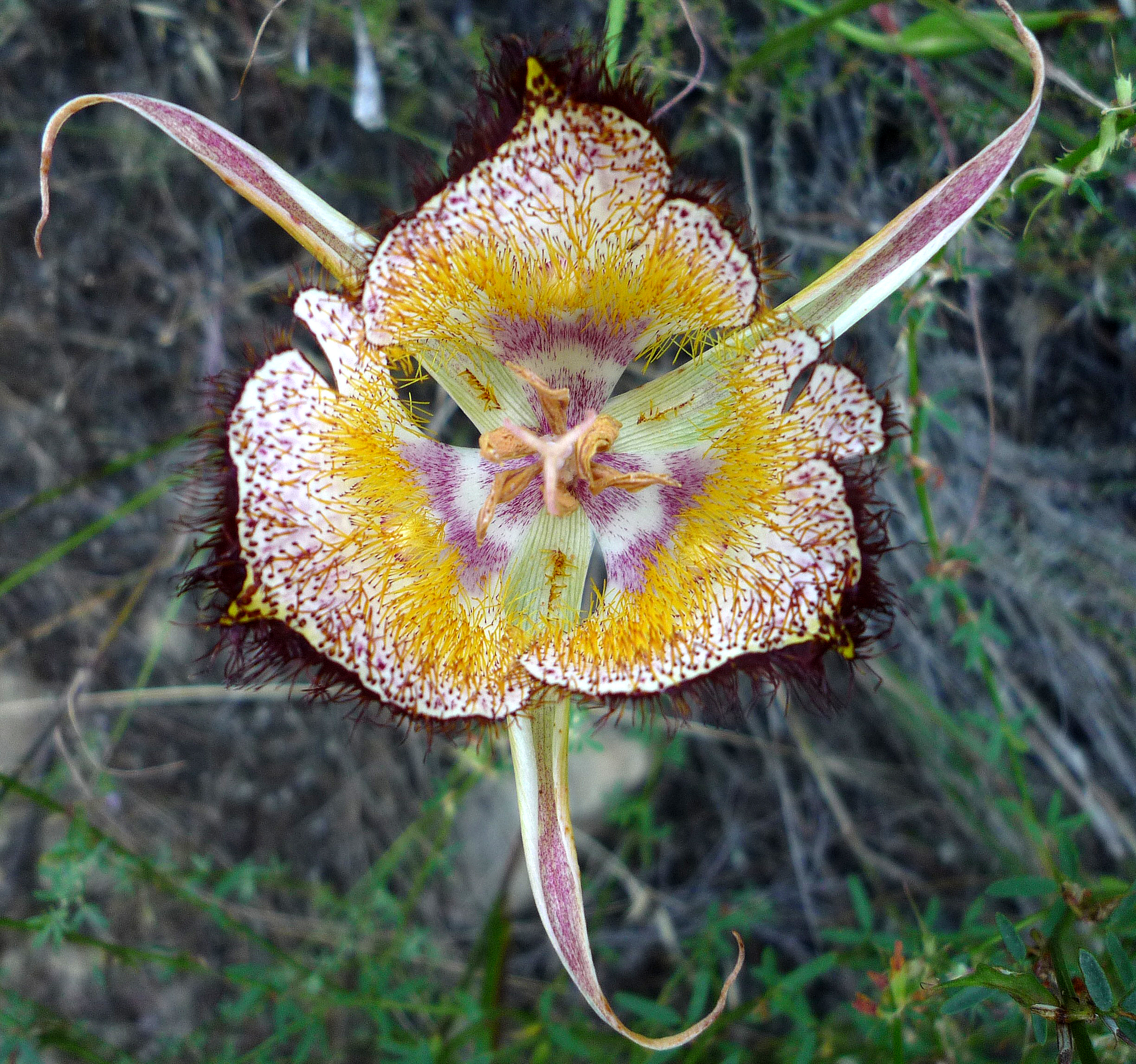
Calochortus fimbriatus has fimbriate flowers.

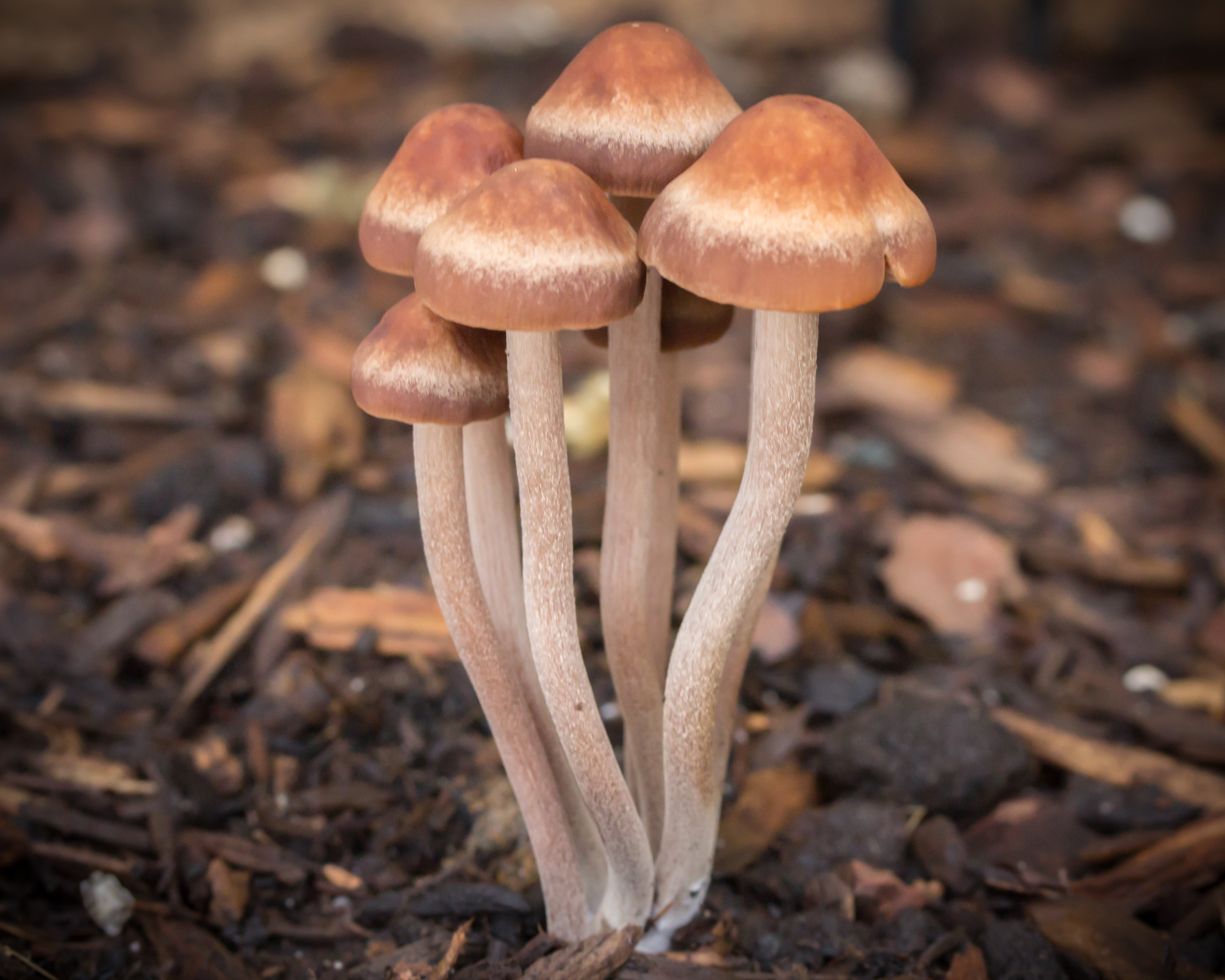
Panaeolus cinctulus has gently flexuous stipes.

F1 hybrid
A single cross; a plant breeding term for the result of a repeatable cross between two pure bred lines.
F2 hybrid
A plant breeding term for the result of a plant arising from a cross between two F1 hybrids; may also refer to self-pollination in a population of F1 hybrids.
fabiform
Shaped like a kidney bean.
facultative
Able to perform a particular life function, or to live generally, in more than one way. Compare obligate.
falcate
Curved like the blade of a scythe.
family
A taxonomic group of one or more genera with features, ancestry, or both in common. It is the term for the principal rank between order and genus.
farina
Powdery, pale yellow, crystalline secretion consisting of flavonoids in Primula and other species.
farinaceous
Powderiness that is mealy.
fascicle

A cluster of flowers, leaves, needles, vascular tissue, etc., e.g. a tuft of leaves all arising from the same node.
fasciculate
Branching in clusters, e.g. a bundle of sticks or needles; having fascicles.
fastigiate
1. In Plant morphology, the habit of a plant that consists in part, of a bundle of erect, more or less parallel branches or stems, particularly if they form or taper to a peak or point. (Latin fastigiatus, meaning "having a peak".
2. In palynology, the form of a pollen grain that has a fastigium, a pointed apex over a hollow between the layers of the pollen outer wall.
faucal
Pertaining to the fauces; located in the throat of a calyx or corolla.
fauces
The throat of a calyx or corolla; the conspicuously widened portion between the mouth and the apex of the tube. In Boraginaceae, the site of distinctive appendages.
faveolate
Honeycombed; having regular, angled pits. Compare foveolate.
felted
Having interlocked hairs to the extent of being matted.
female flower
See pistillate flower.
fenestrate
Having translucent or transparent areas that let light through; this variously affects the behavior of animal visitors or permits photosynthesis in many arid-region plants that grow only to the soil surface. Also refers loosely to perforations, for which perforate is the more precise term.
ferruginous
Ruddy or rust-colored.
fertile
Capable of producing fruit; of flowers when they produce seed, or of anthers containing pollen.
fertilization
The union of male and female gametes during sexual reproduction.
fiber
1. A fiber cell.
2. Any flexible, strong, stringy, and very elongate structure.
fiber cell
A type of cell that is found in sclerenchyma; it is much elongated, and dies soon after an extensive modification of its cell wall. The cell wall is usually thickly lignified but is sometimes gelatinous.
filament
1. The stalk of a stamen.
2. Any very narrow, thread-like structure that is one or a few cells thick.
filamentous
Consisting of filaments or fibers; hairlike.
filiform
Thread-like, e.g. stamen filaments or leaf shapes.
fimbria

Slender, hair-like projection; fringe.
fimbriate
Fringed, e.g. where the ends of a petal are split into two or more divisions. Having fimbriae.
fissure
A split or crack, often referring to fissured bark; a line or opening of dehiscence.
fistule
A tube-shaped cavity.
fistulose
Hollow; usually applied to a tube-shaped cavity, as in a reed.
flabellate
Fan-shaped, e.g. a flabellate (fan-shaped) leaf.
flaccid
Limp; tending to wilt. Compare turgid.
flexistyly
Depending on the degree of maturation of the stamens, the style moves up or down (cataflexistyle or (ana-)hyperflexisyle).
flexuous
flexuose
Bent alternately in different directions; zigzag.
floccose
Having a soft and wooly covering of hairs.
flora
1. All the plants growing in a certain region or country.
2. An enumeration of them, generally with a guide to their identification (e.g. the Flora of North America, Flora of China, Flora of Victoria, Flora of New South Wales, and so on). In this case, flora is written with a capital F.
floral envelope
See perianth.
floral leaves
The upper leaves at the base of the flowering branches.
floral diagram
A graphical means to describe flower structure, usually a schematic cross-section through a young flower.
floral formula
A description of flower structure using numbers, letters, and various symbols.
floral tube
An imprecise term sometimes used as a synonym of hypanthium, corolla tube, or calyx tube.
floret
A small flower, usually referring to the individual true flowers clustered within an inflorescence, particularly those of the Poaceae grasses and the pseudanthia of family Asteraceae.
flower
The sexual reproductive structure of the angiosperms, typically with a gynoecium, androecium, perianth, and an axis.
foliate
1. When describing a whole plant: leafy or having leaves (as opposed to nonfoliate).
2. When preceded by a number: specifying a number of leaflets, e.g. 3-foliate means "having three leaflets".
foliicolous
A growth habit of certain lichens, algae, and fungi that prefer to grow on the leaves of vascular plants.
follicle
A dry fruit formed from one carpel splitting along a single suture to which the seeds are attached, e.g. from the pod of a legume.
foliole
A leaflet of a compound leaf.
foliose
Leaf-like; flattened like a leaf.
forb
In American English, a term used for any non-woody flowering plant that is not a grass, sedge, or rush. Roughly equivalent to herb in British and other forms of English
forest
Vegetation dominated by trees with single trunks, including closely arranged trees with or without an understory of shrubs and herbs.
forma (in common usage, form)
A taxonomic category subordinate to species and within the taxonomic hierarchy, below variety (varietas), and usually differentiated by a minor character. Its abbreviation is "f."
foveolate
Having regular tiny pits. Compare faveolate.
free
Not united with other organs of the same type; not attached at one end.
free central
(of placentation) Ovules attached to a free-standing column in the center of a unilocular ovary.
frond
A leaf of a fern, cycad, or palm.
frutescent
Shrub-like (fruticose) or becoming shrub-like.
fruticose
Shrubby; having the branching character of a shrub.
fruit
A seed-bearing structure, present in all angiosperms, formed from the mature ovary and sometimes associated floral parts upon fertilization.
fugacious
Disappearing, falling off, or withering. Compare persistent and caducous.
funicle (funiculus)
The stalk of an ovule.
funnelform
Having a form gradually widening from the base to the apex; funnel-shaped.
furcate
Forked, usually applied to a terminal division; with two long lobes.
fused
Joined together.
fusiform
Rod-shaped and narrowing gradually from the middle toward each end; spindle-shaped.
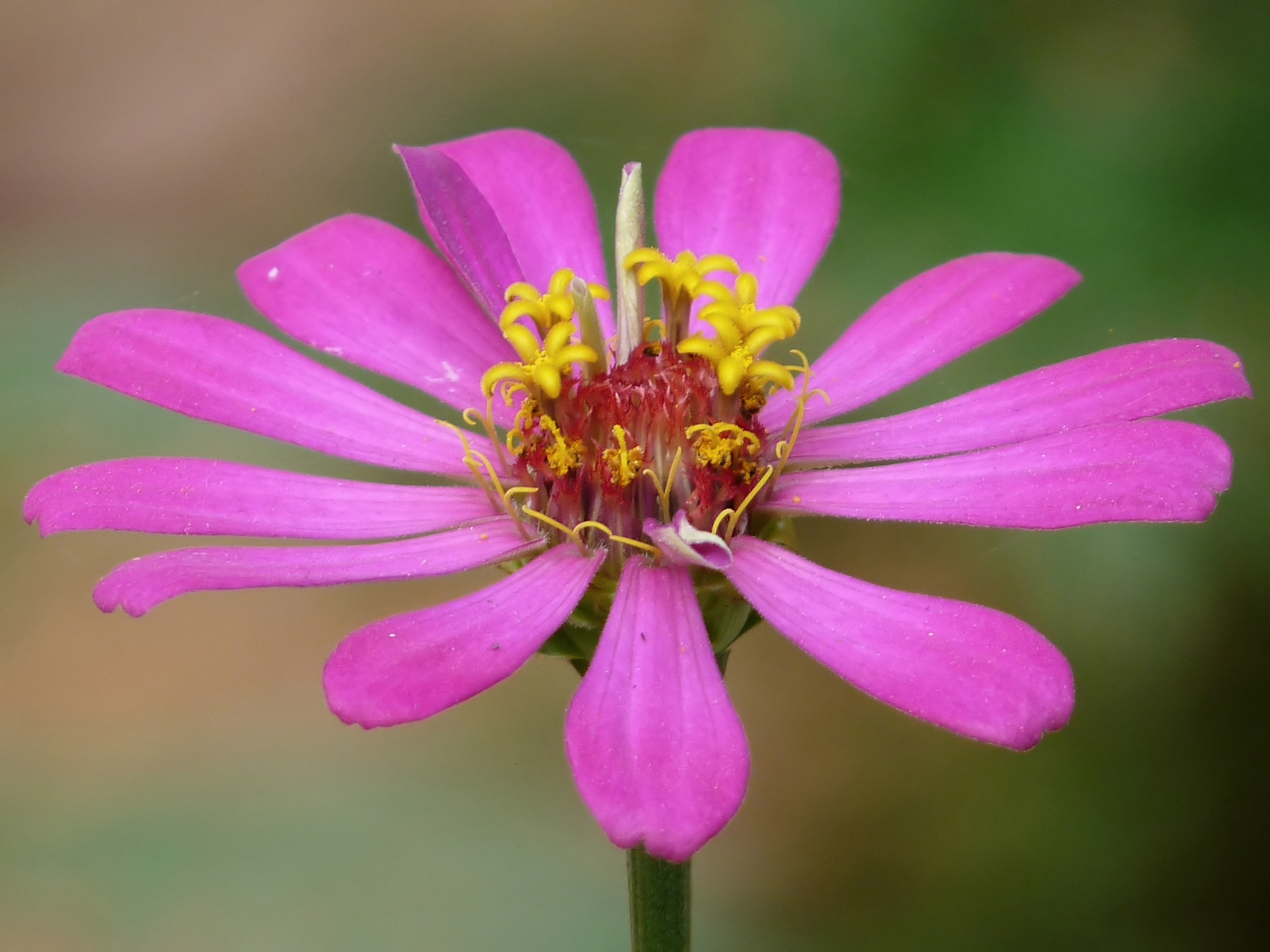
The pseudanthium of Zinnia elegans is typical of many Asteraceae in that it includes two types of florets, ray florets and disk florets.

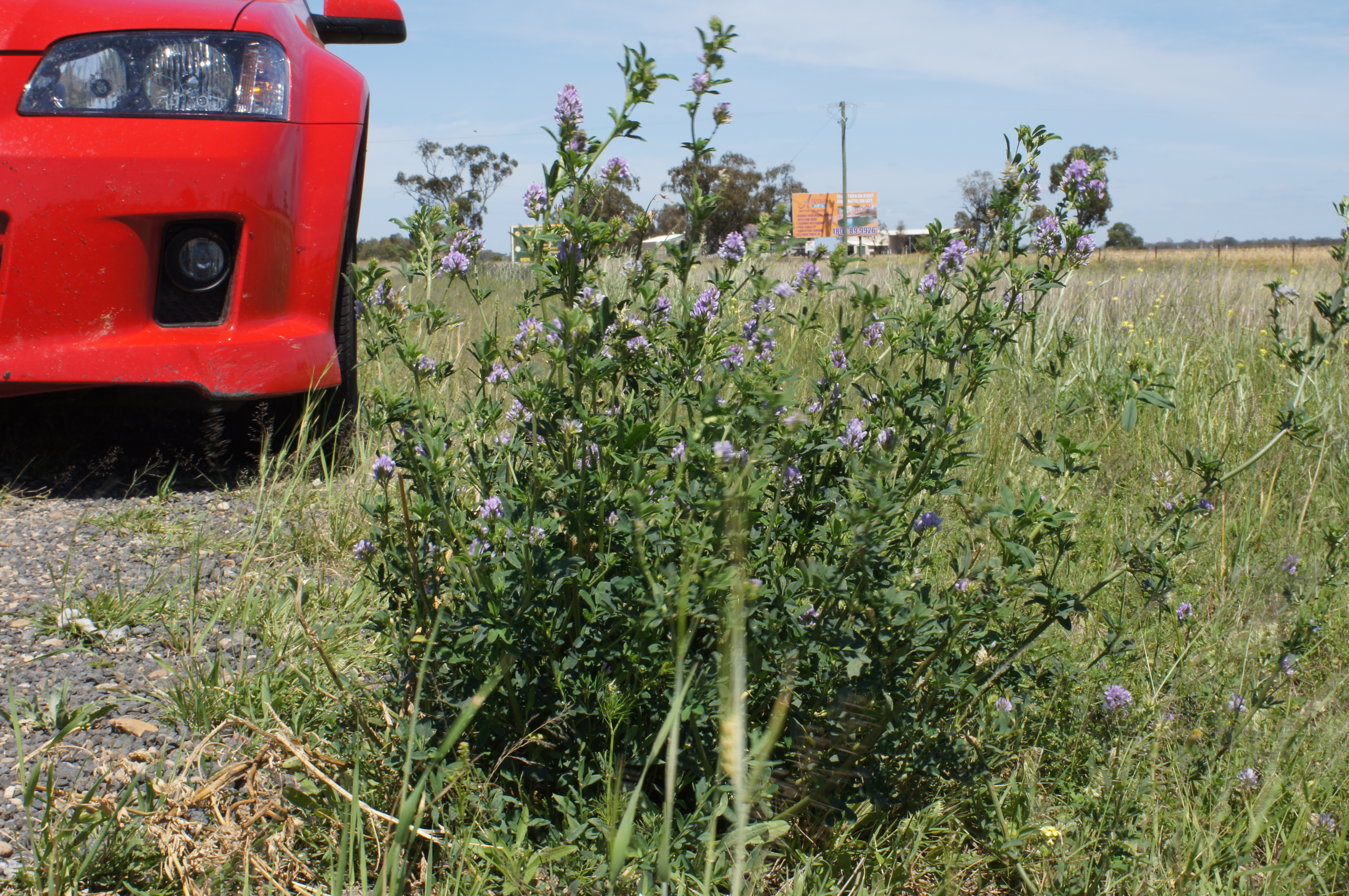
Medicago sativa (alfalfa or lucerne) is an agriculturally important forb, grown in large volumes for forage, soil improvement, and other purposes.

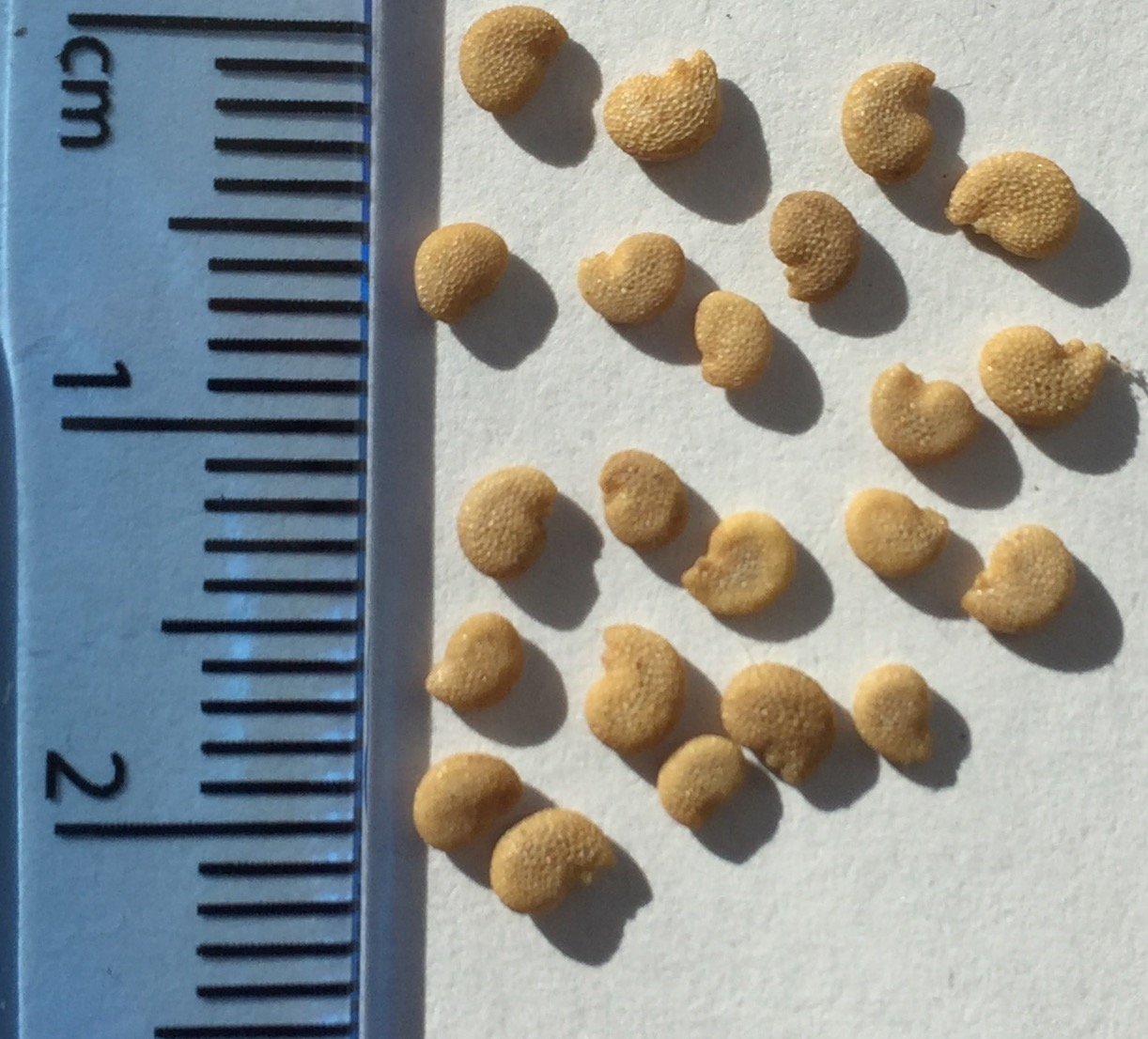
Foveolate seeds of Physochlaina physaloides

== G ==
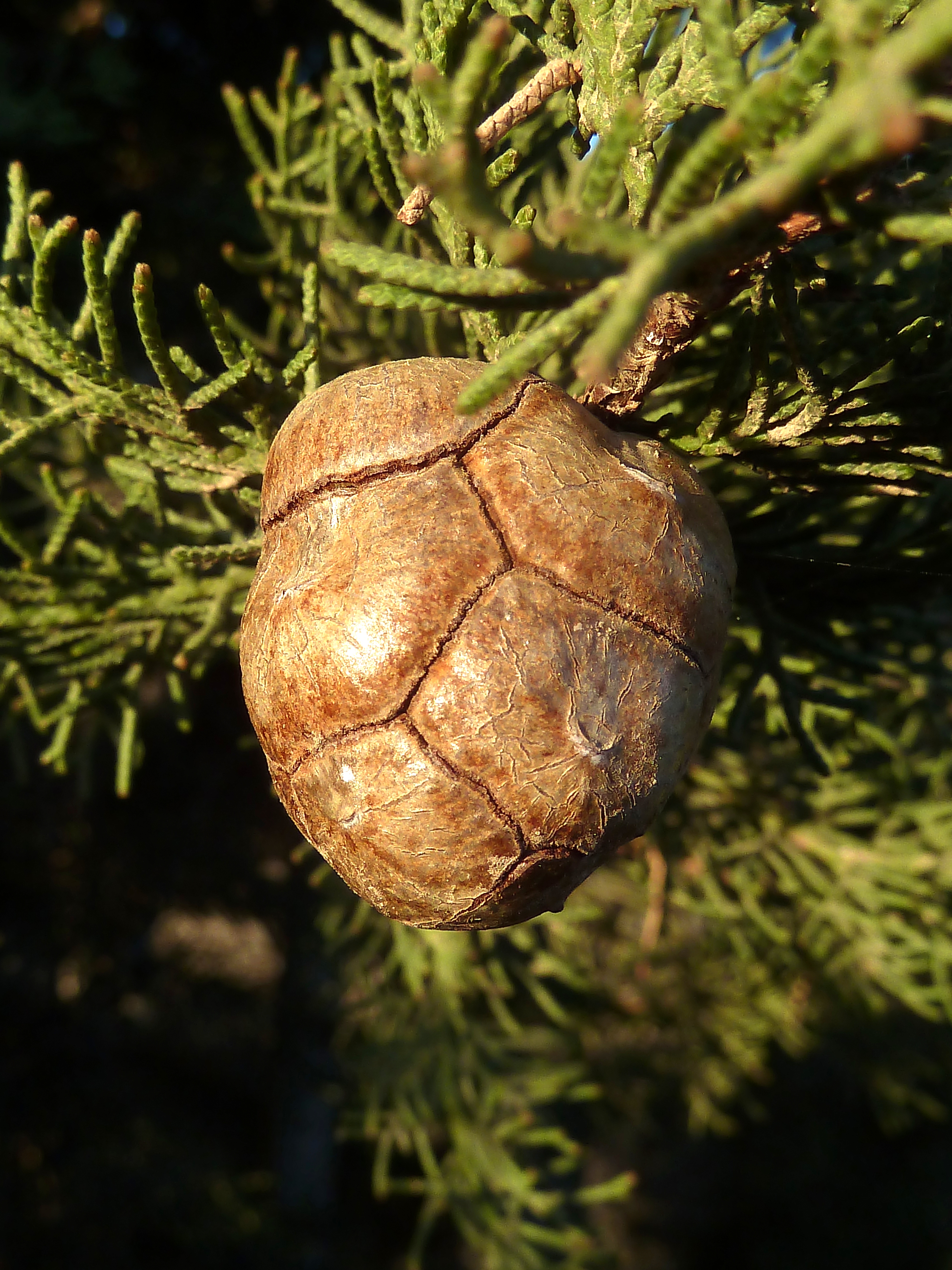
Galbulus cone on the coniferous tree Cupressus sempervirens

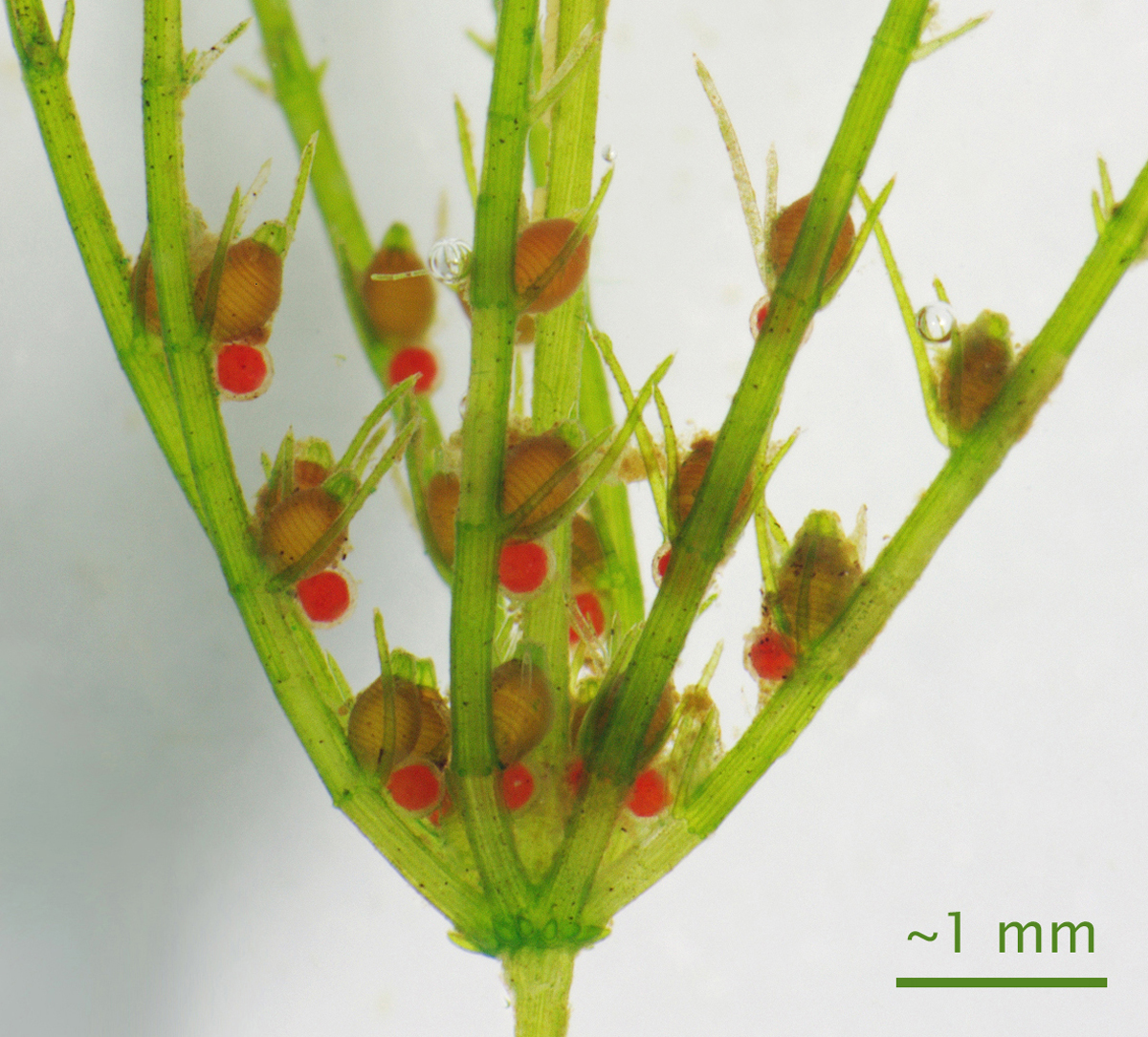
Gametophores (red male antheridia and brown female archegonia) borne on a gametophyte of a Chara species of green algae

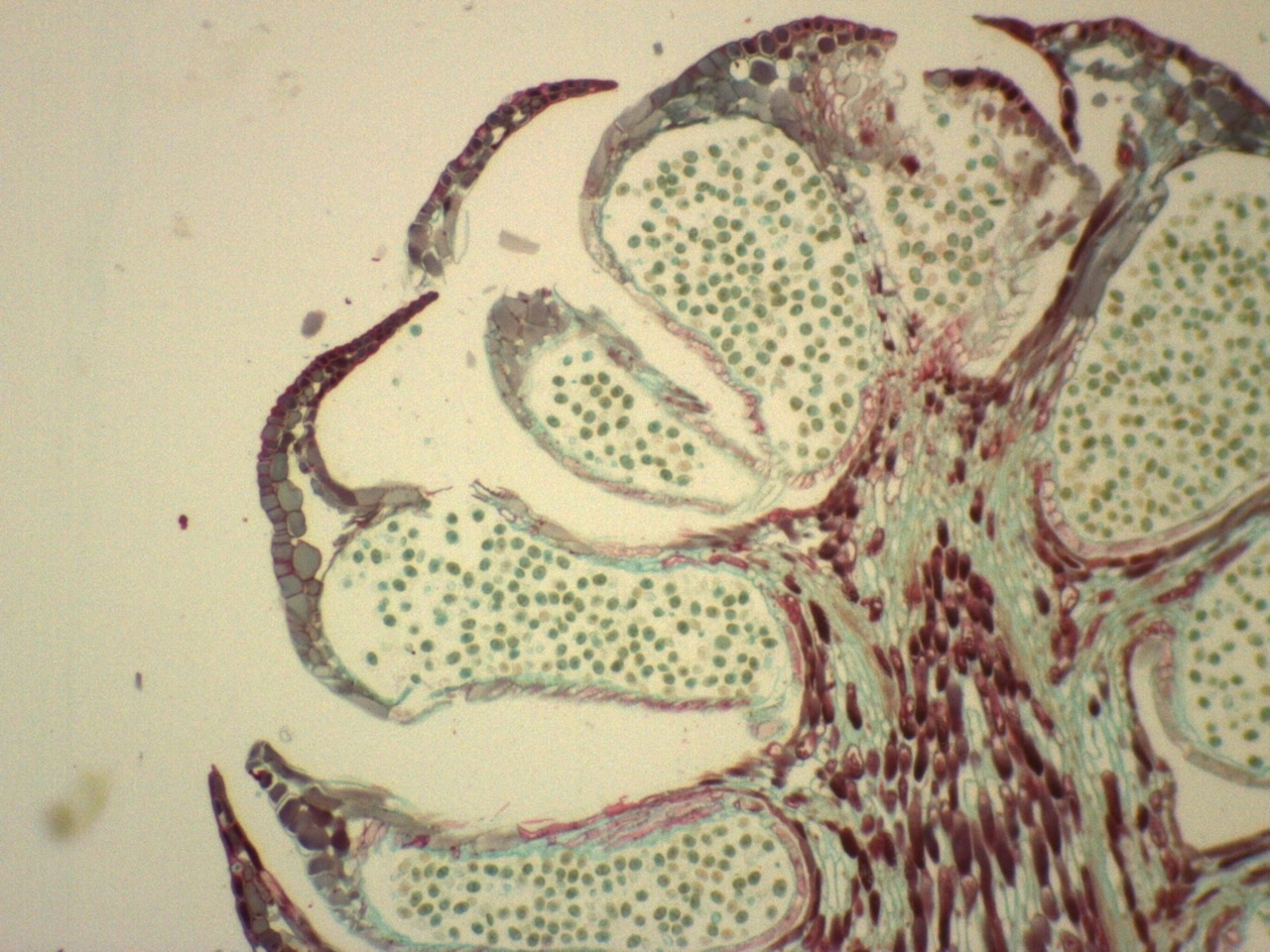
Longitudinal section of immature male pine cone, showing male gametophytes (pollen grains) developing between the cone scales

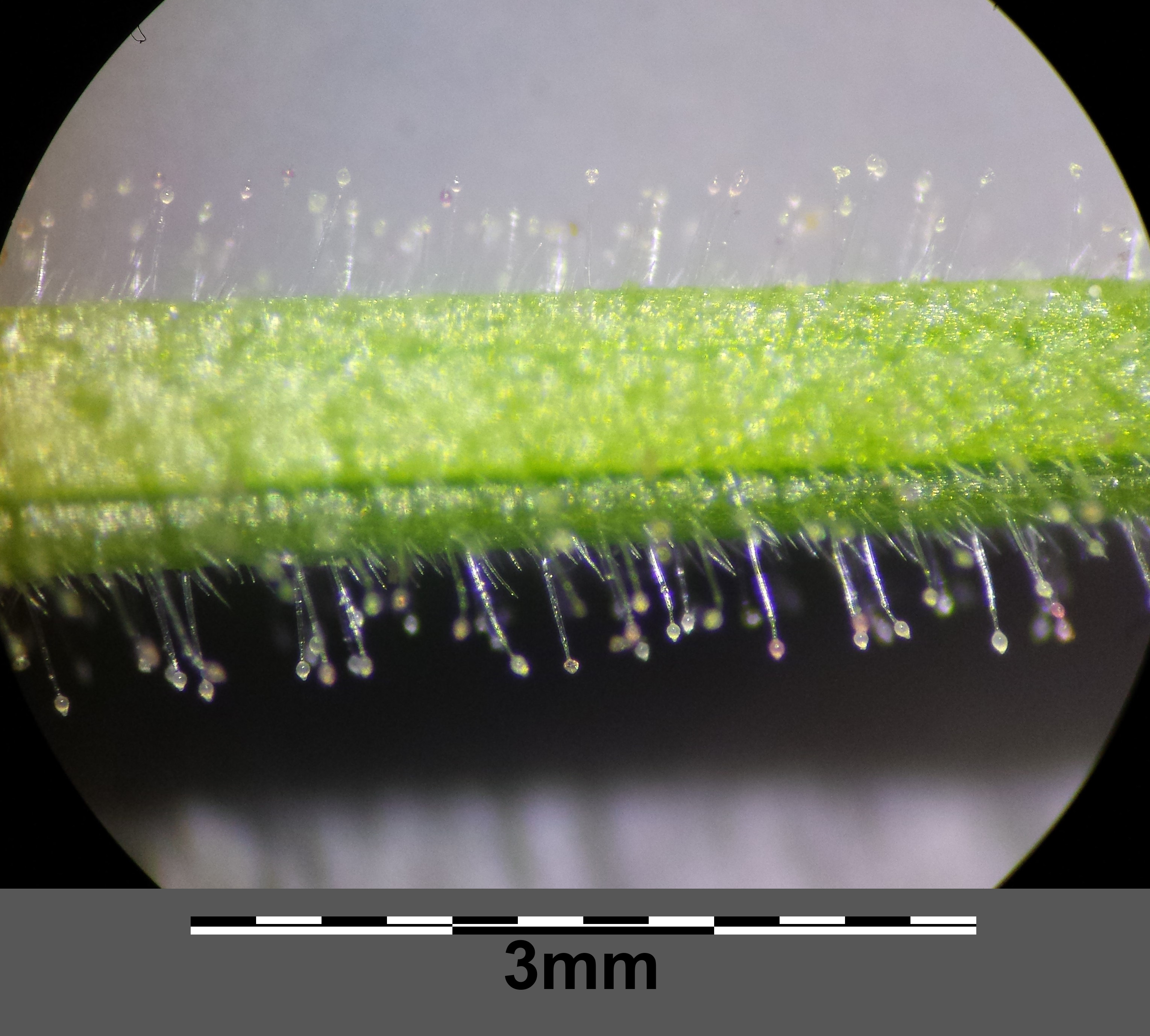
Glandular hairs on the stem of Geranium dissectum

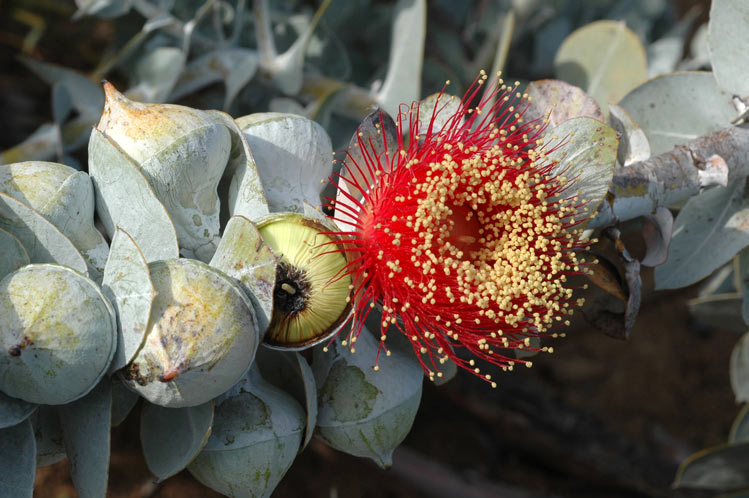
The leaves, buds, and young stalks of Eucalyptus macrocarpa are glaucous, covered with a thick waxy pruinosity.

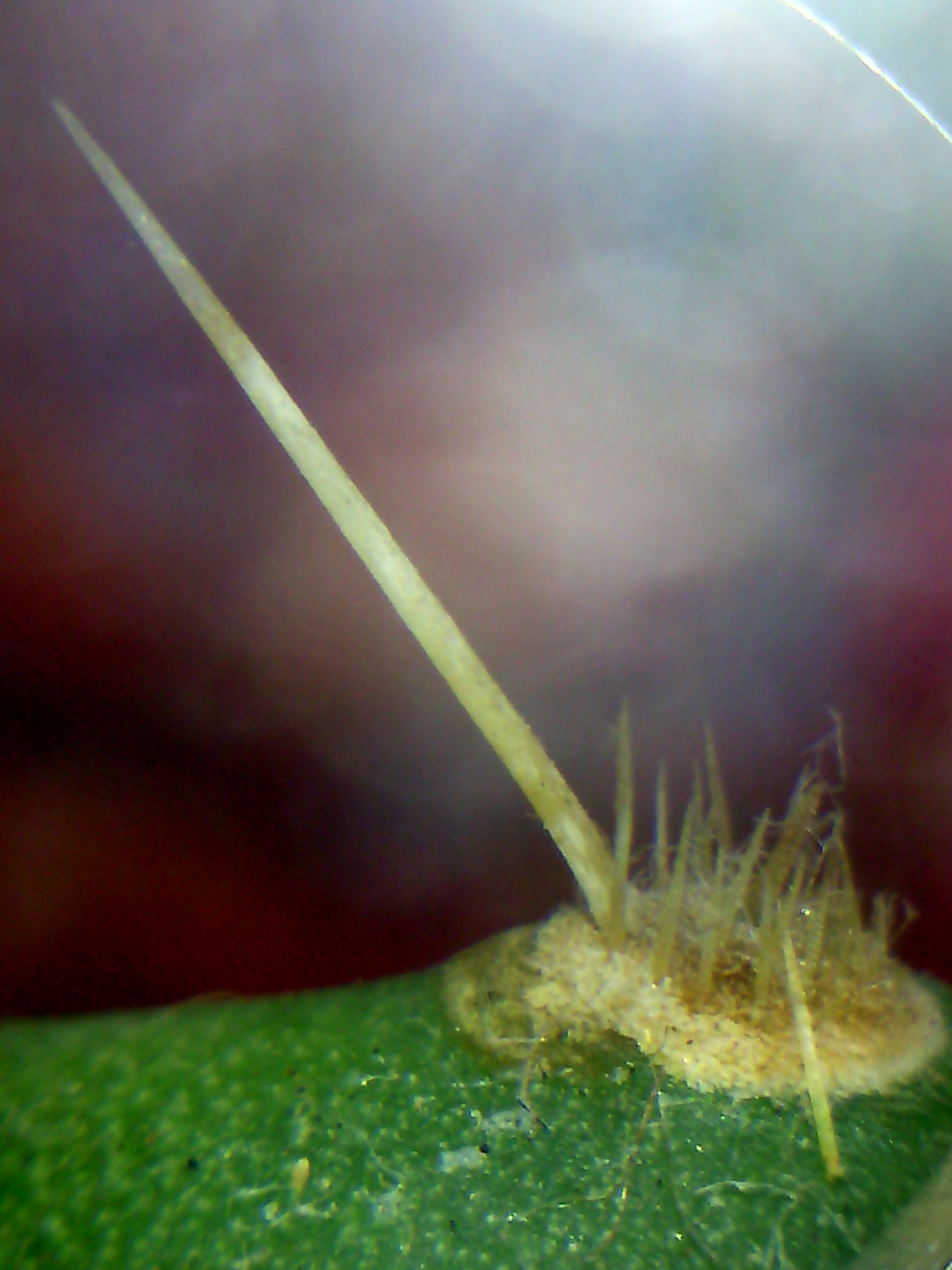
Glochids at the base of an Opuntia cactus spine

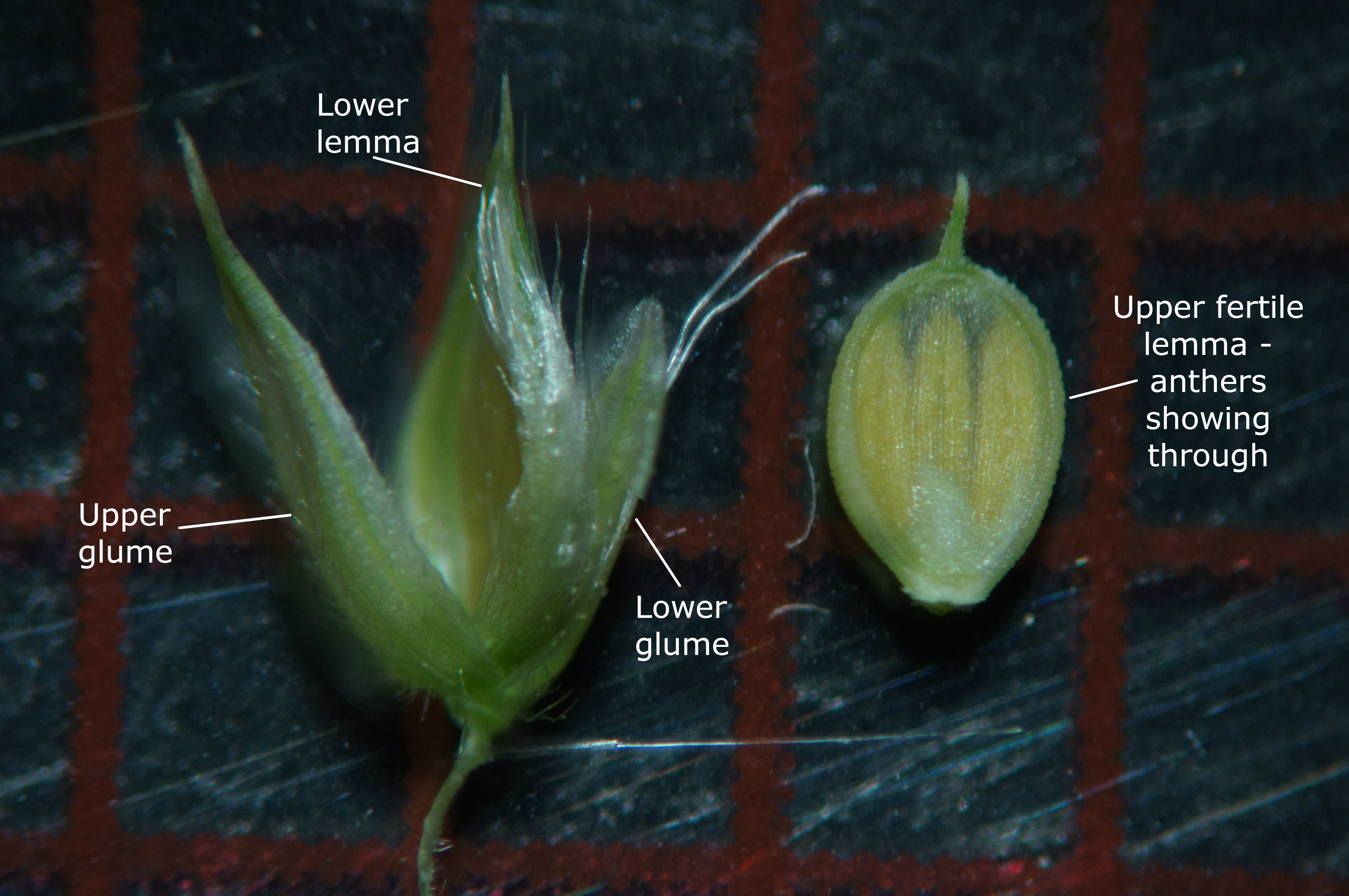
Glumes of a grass species with a fairly large inflorescence

galbulus
From Latin, galbulus, the cone (megastrobilus) of the Mediterranean cypress. By modern extension, a specialist term for the cone of any species in the cypress family Cupressaceae. It includes the fleshy cones borne by junipers, which are often mistakenly called berries.
galea
An overhanging, helmet-shaped, structure that protects the reproductive parts from precipitation, wind or unwanted visitors.
gall
Abnormal outgrowth on external plant tissues, caused by various parasites, from viruses, fungi and bacteria, to other plants, insects and mites.
gamete
A cell or nucleus that fuses with another of the opposite sex during sexual reproduction.
gametophore
Specialized structures on the gametophytes of some bryophyte species, for example many species in the order Marchantiales; in such species the gametes are produced on the gametophores.
gametophyte
The haploid multicellular phase in the alternation of generations of plants and algae that bears gametes. In bryophytes the gametophyte is the dominant vegetative phase; in ferns and their allies it is a small free-living plant known as the prothallus; in gymnosperms and angiosperms the gametophytes are reduced to microscopic structures dependent on the sporophyte, male gametophytes contained in pollen grains and females contained within the ovules.
gamopetalous
with joined or fused petals
gamophyllous
a single perianth-whorl of united segments. Compare symphyllous (synonym), apophyllous, and polyphyllous.
gemma
an asexual reproductive structure found in liverworts and mosses.
gene pool
The complete range of genetic variation found within a population.
genus

A group of one or more species with features or ancestry (or both) in common. Genus is the principal category of taxa intermediate in rank between family and species in the standard nomenclatural hierarchy.
generic name
The name of a taxonomic genus, such as Acacia and Eucalyptus.
genotype
The genetic make-up of an individual.
geophilous
Growing or rooting in the ground.
germination
1. of seeds, describing the complex sequence of physiological and structural changes that occur from resting to growth stage.
2. of a pollen grain; production of a pollen tube when contacting a stigma receptive to it.
3. of a spore of fungi/bacterium; change of state – from resting to vegetative.
gibbous (gibbose)
(of part of an organ) Swollen, usually with a pouch-like enlargement at the base.
glabrescent
Becoming glabrous, almost glabrous; glabrate.
glabrous
Lacking surface ornamentation such as hairs, scales or bristles; smooth.
gland
A secretory structure within or on the surface of a plant.
glandular hair
A hair tipped with a gland.
glaucous
Describing the external surface of a plant part that has a whitish covering, in some cases with a blueish cast. Often applied to plants with a wooly or arachnoid surface, but properly referring to pruinose surfaces, meaning those with a waxy bloom. The surfaces of the young leaves of many eucalypts provide good examples, and so do some xerophytes.
globose

Roughly spherical. See also subglobose.
globulose
Approximately spherical.
glochid
A tiny barbed hair or bristle, e.g. the fine defensive hairs in cactus species such as Opuntia.
glomerule
An inflorescence consisting of a compact cluster of sessile or subsessile flowers.
glumes
bracts subtending the floret(s) of a sedge, or similar plant; in grasses forming the lowermost organs of a spikelet (there are usually 2 but 1 is sometimes reduced; or rarely, both are absent).
glutinous
Sticky.
graft
1. The artificial union of plant parts.
2. A plant shoot suitable for grafting; loosely, a scion, sucker, or branch.
graft chimaera (sometimes graft hybrid)
A taxon whose members consist of tissue from two or more different plants in intimate association originated by grafting. The addition sign "+" is used to indicate a graft-chimaera either as a part of a formula (e.g. Crataegus monogyna + Mespilus germanica) or in front of an abbreviated name (e.g. + Crataegomespilus 'Dardari'). The nomenclature of graft hybrids is governed by the International Code of Nomenclature for Cultivated Plants.
graminaceous

Of or relating to grass.
graminoid
An herbaceous plant with a grass-like morphology.
granular
(of a surface) Covered with small rounded protuberances.
grass
A plant of the family Poaceae.
grassland
Low vegetation dominated by grasses.
groundcover
1. Dense vegetation that covers the ground.
2. A term applied to describe a plant that covers the soil surface so densely that it smothers all beneath it.
group
A formal category equivalent to or below the rank of genus which distinguishes
1. an assemblage of two or more cultivars within a species or hybrid;
2. plants derived from a hybrid in which one or more of the parent species is not known or is of uncertain origin; or,
3. a range of cultivated plants of a species or hybrid which may exhibit variation but share one or more characters, which makes it worth distinguishing them as a unit.
guard cell
Each of two cells surrounding the stoma which control gas exchange between the apoplast of the plant and the external environment.
guttate
Having droplet-shaped spots. Compare punctate and maculate.
guttation
The secretion of liquid water from uninjured plant parts. See hydathode.
guttulate
Having or appearing to be spotted with oil droplets; of spores, having oil droplets inside.
gymnosperm
A seed-bearing plant with unenclosed ovules borne on the surface of a sporophyll. Gymnosperms are among the oldest clades of vascular plants, and today are represented by approximately 1,000 extant species worldwide, including, among others, conifers, Ginkgo, Gnetum and cycads. Compare angiosperm.
gynaecium
Alternative term for gynoecium, but with partly different etymology.
gynobasic
Of a style, arising near the base of the gynoecium, e.g. between the lobes of the ovary.
gynodioecious
Of a species, with some plants bearing only bisexual flowers and others bearing only female flowers.
gynomonoecious
Of a species, with bisexual flowers and female flowers on the same plant.
gynoecium
The collective term for the female reproductive parts of a flower or for the carpels of a flower, whether united or free. Contrast androecium. Abbreviation: G. For instance, G indicates a superior ovary; G(5) indicates having five fused carpels.
gynophore
A stalk supporting the gynoecium and situated above the level of insertion of the other floral parts.
gynostegium
A compound organ in milkweeds (Asclepiadaceae) and orchids formed by fusion of the filaments of the stamens with the style. Also known as the column.
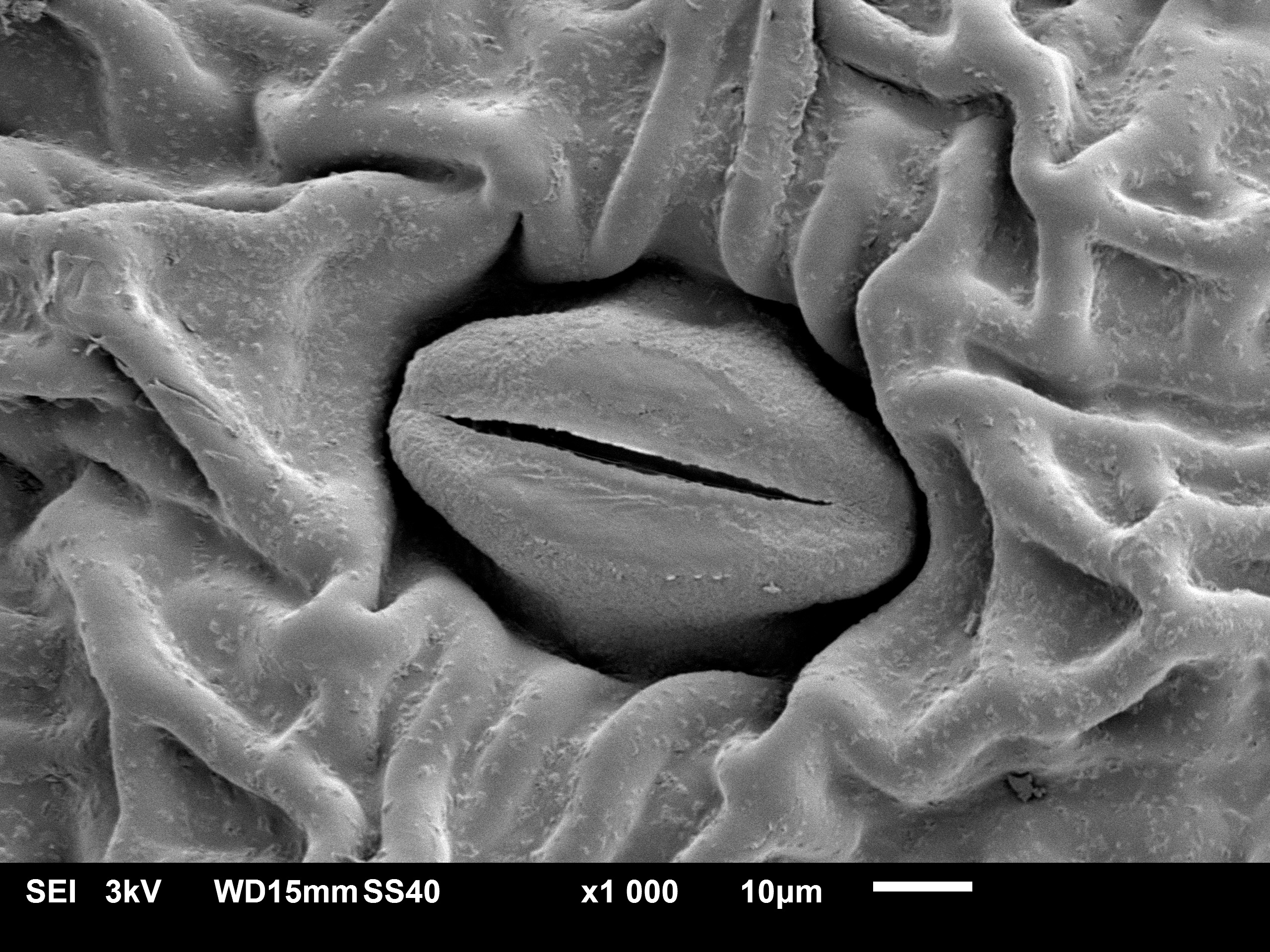
Scanning electron micrograph of a stoma on the leaf of Haemanthus. The two lip-shaped cells on either side of the pore are the guard cells.

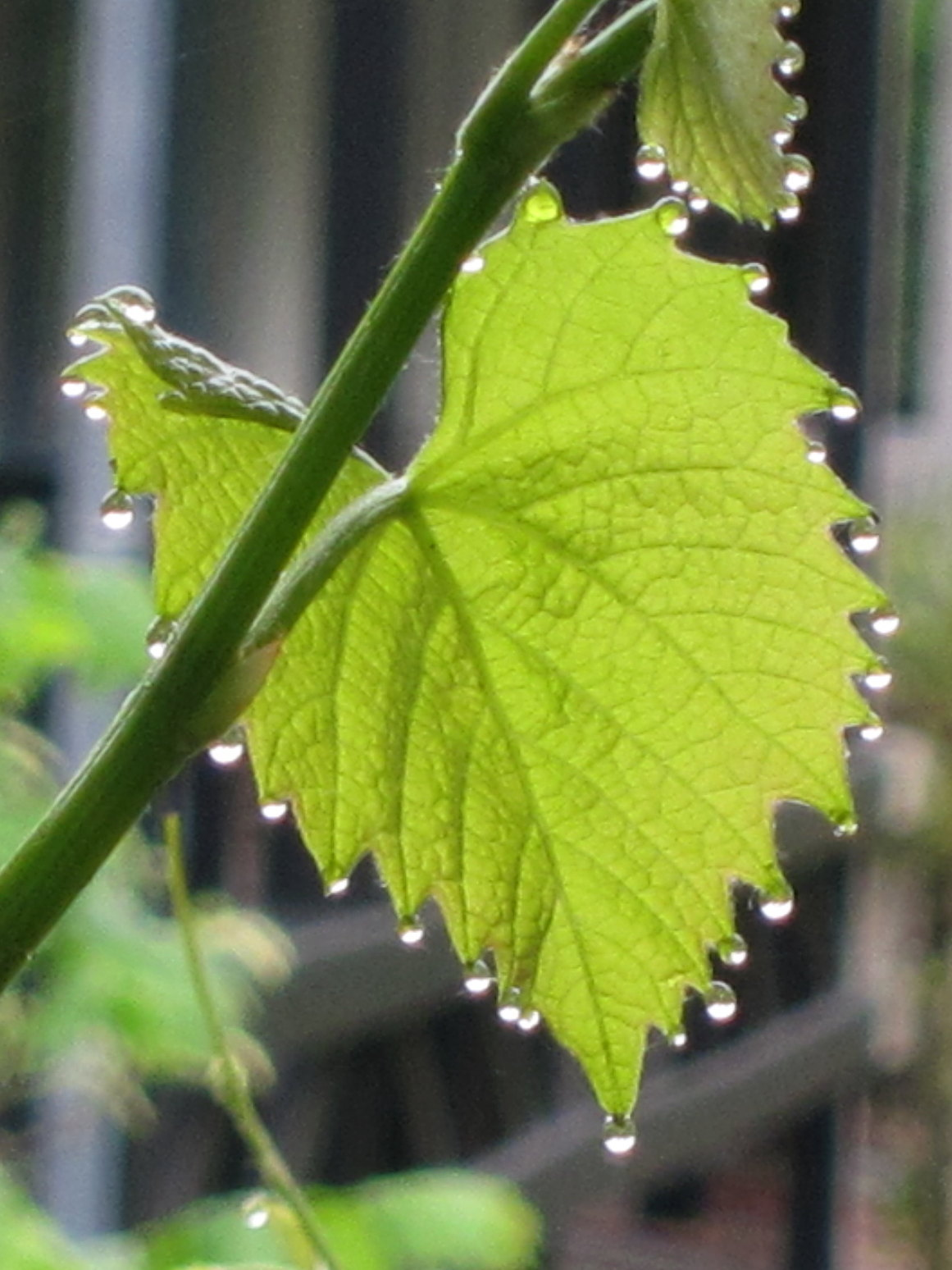
Drops of guttation fluid on the dentate points fringing the immature leaf of a grapevine

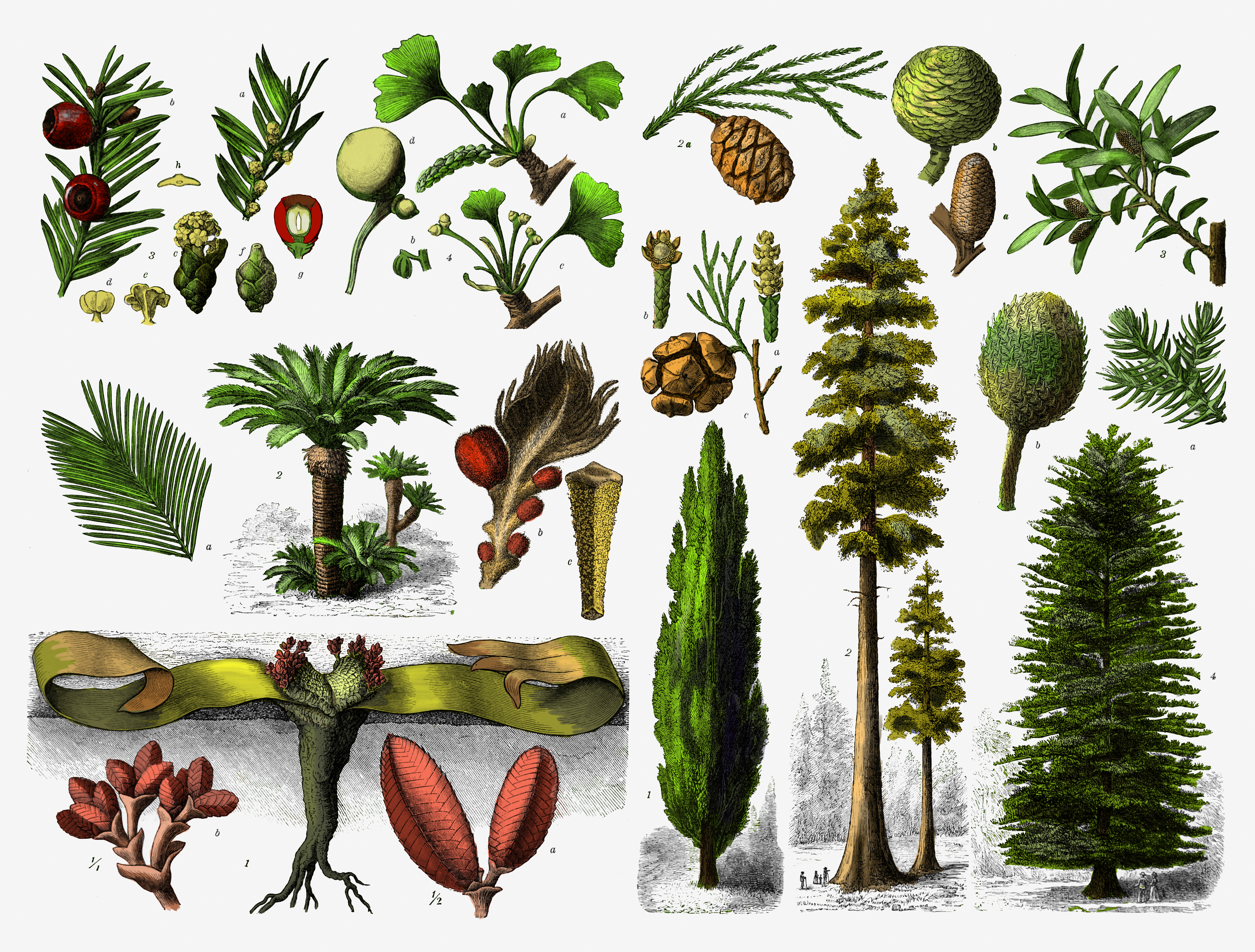
Examples of gymnosperms
LEFT
1-Welwitschia mirabilis
2-Cycas revoluta
3-Taxus baccata
4-Ginkgo biloba
RIGHT
1-Cupressus sempervirens
2-Sequoiadendron giganteum
3-Agathis dammara
4-Araucaria heterophylla

== H ==
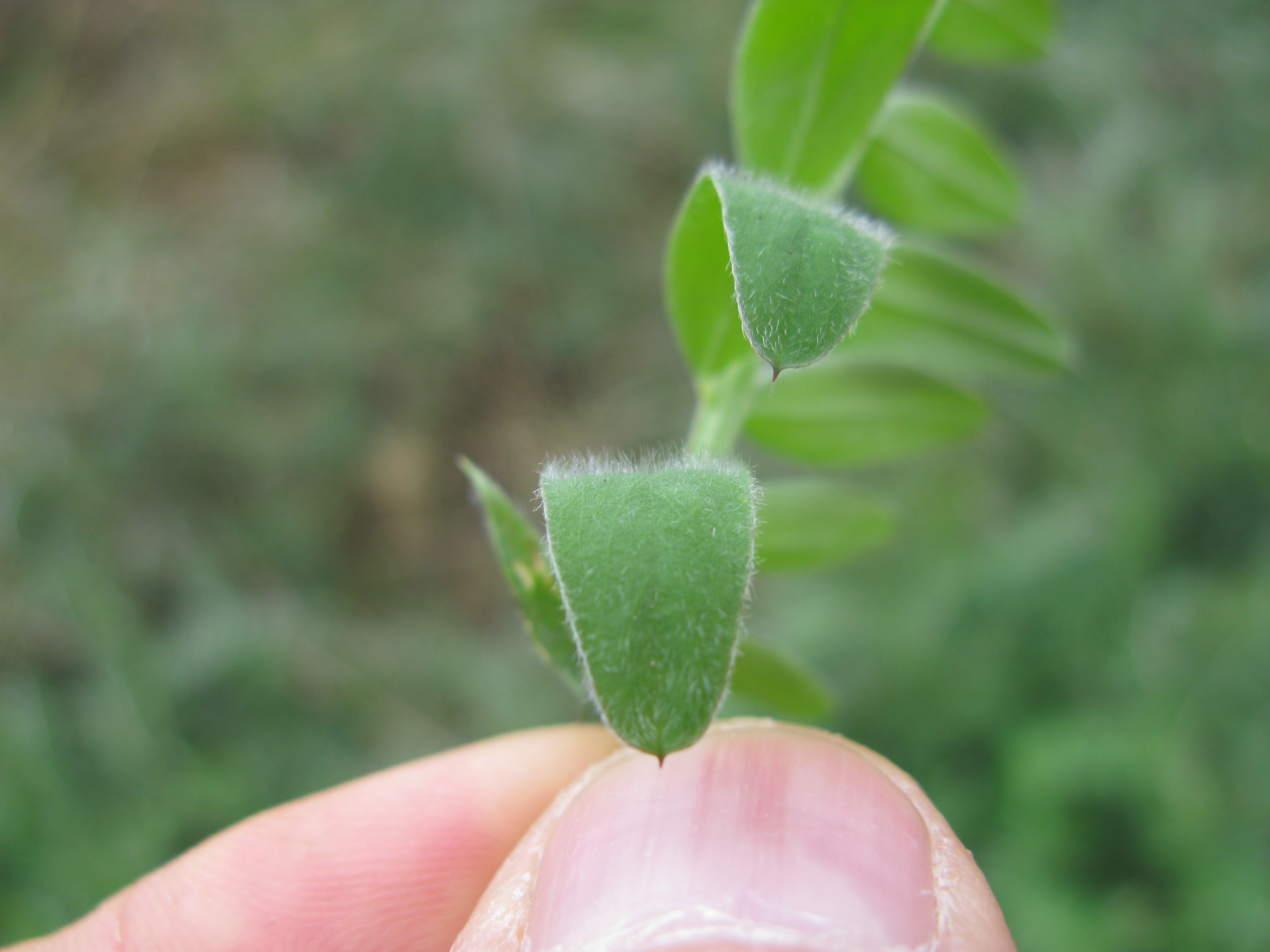
Epidermal hairs on plant leaves

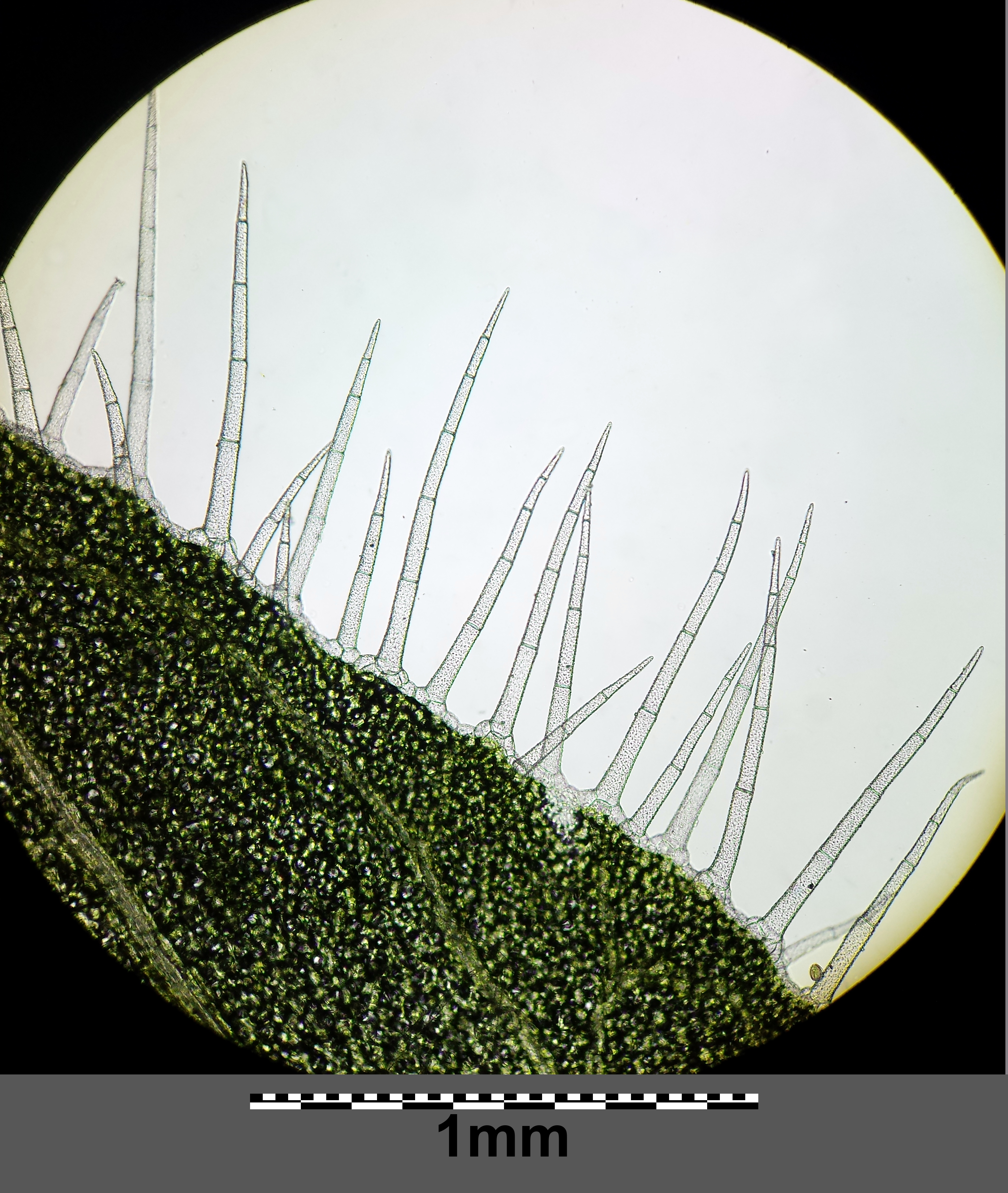
Multicellular hairs on the edge of a sepal of Veronica sublobata

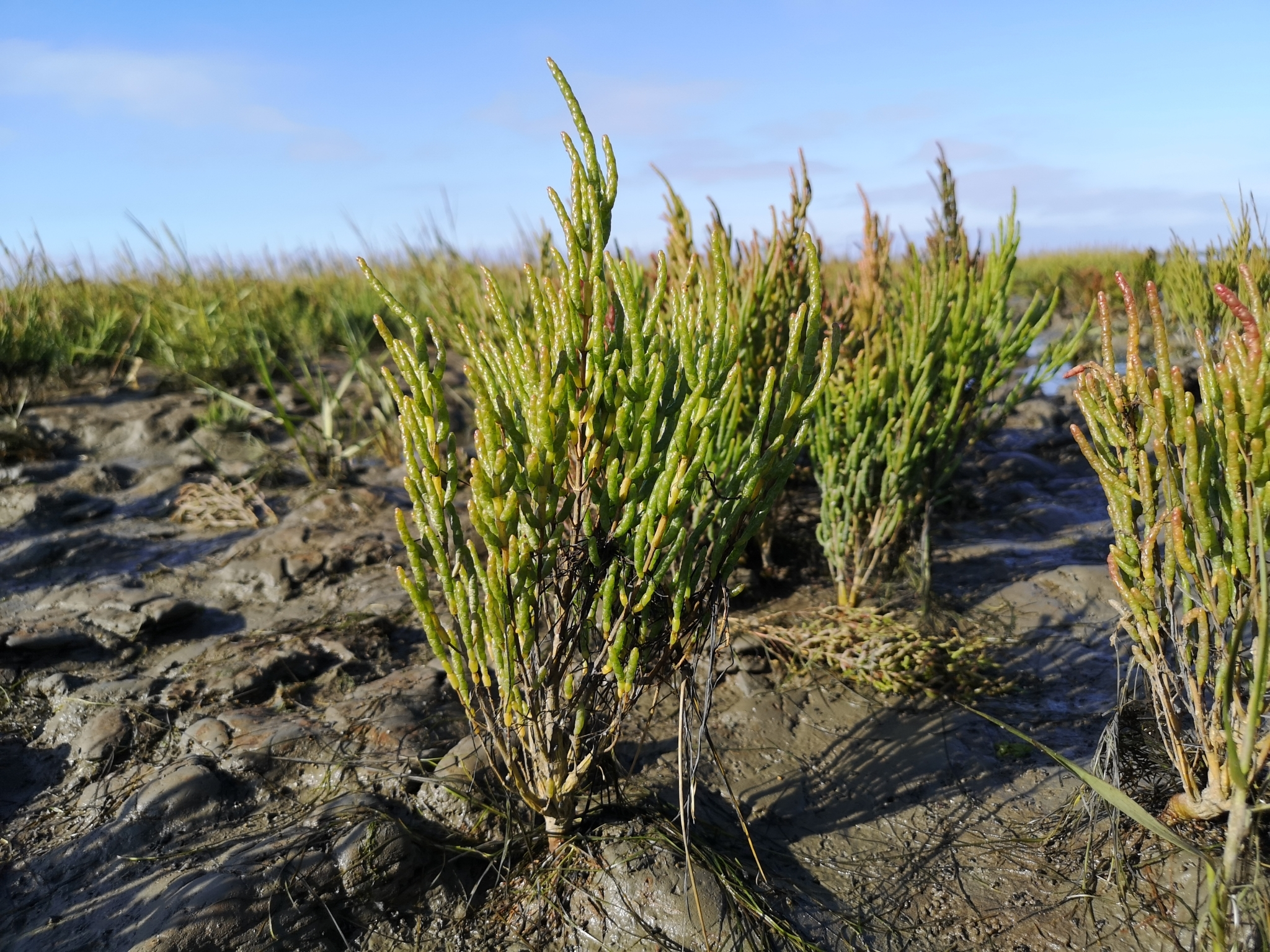
Salicornia europaea, growing on a tidal mudflat inundated by salt-rich seawater twice daily, is a typical halophyte with thick, fleshy stems.

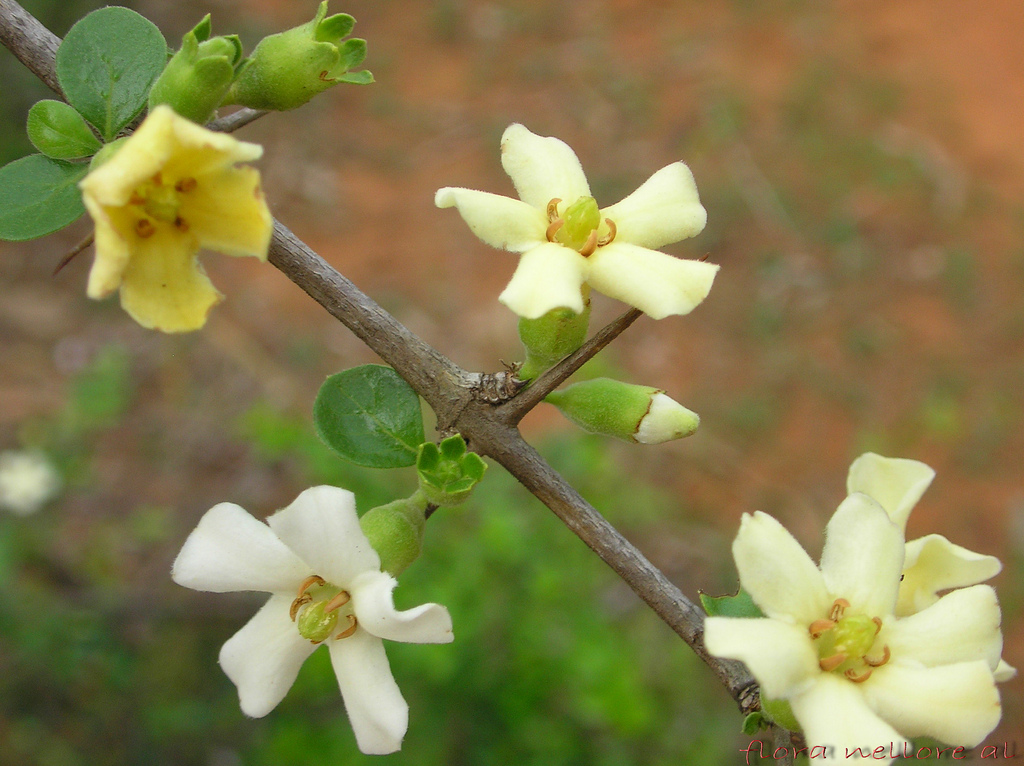
Haplostemonous arrangement of stamens and petals

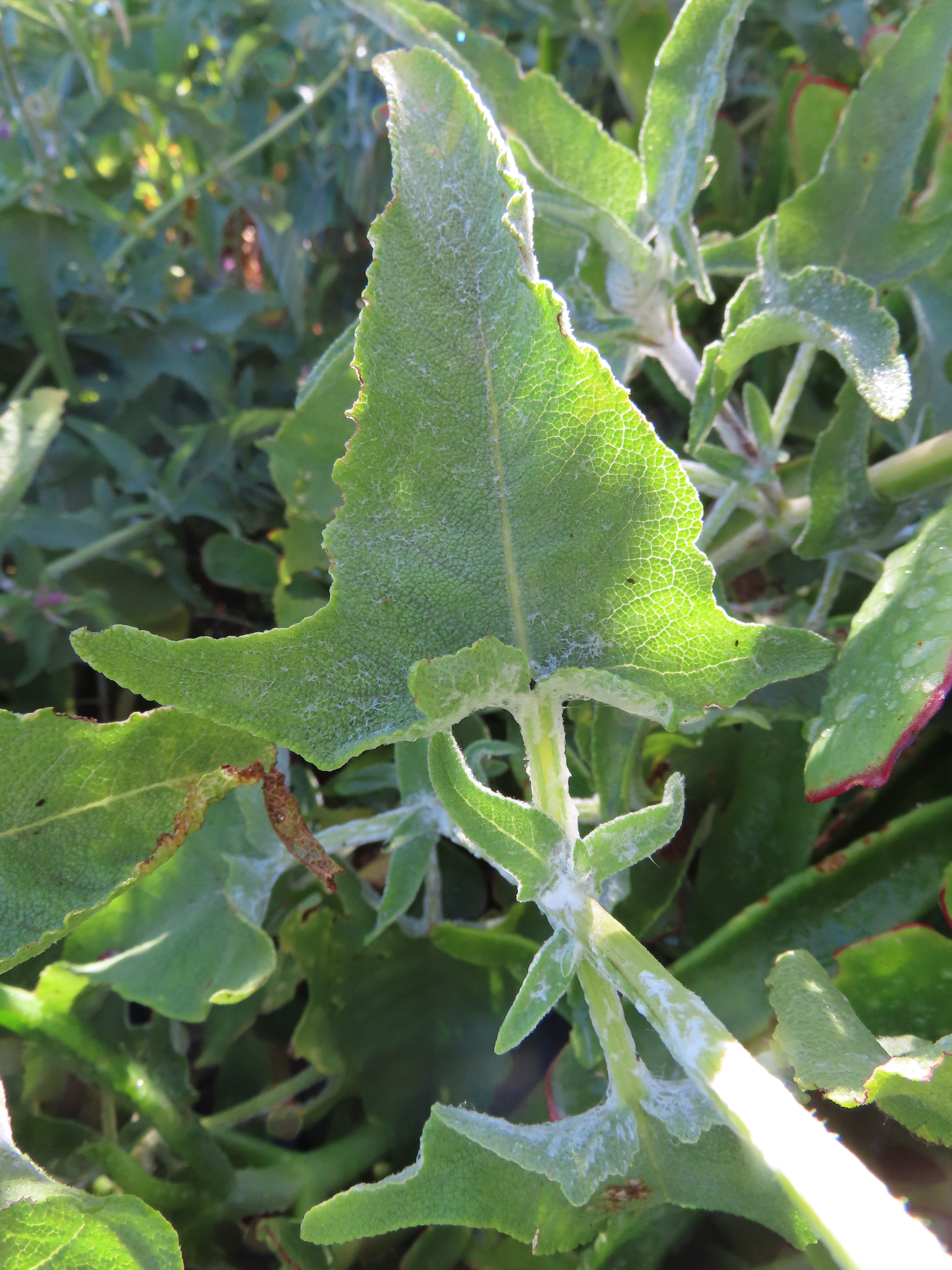
Markedly hastate leaf of Salvia canariensis

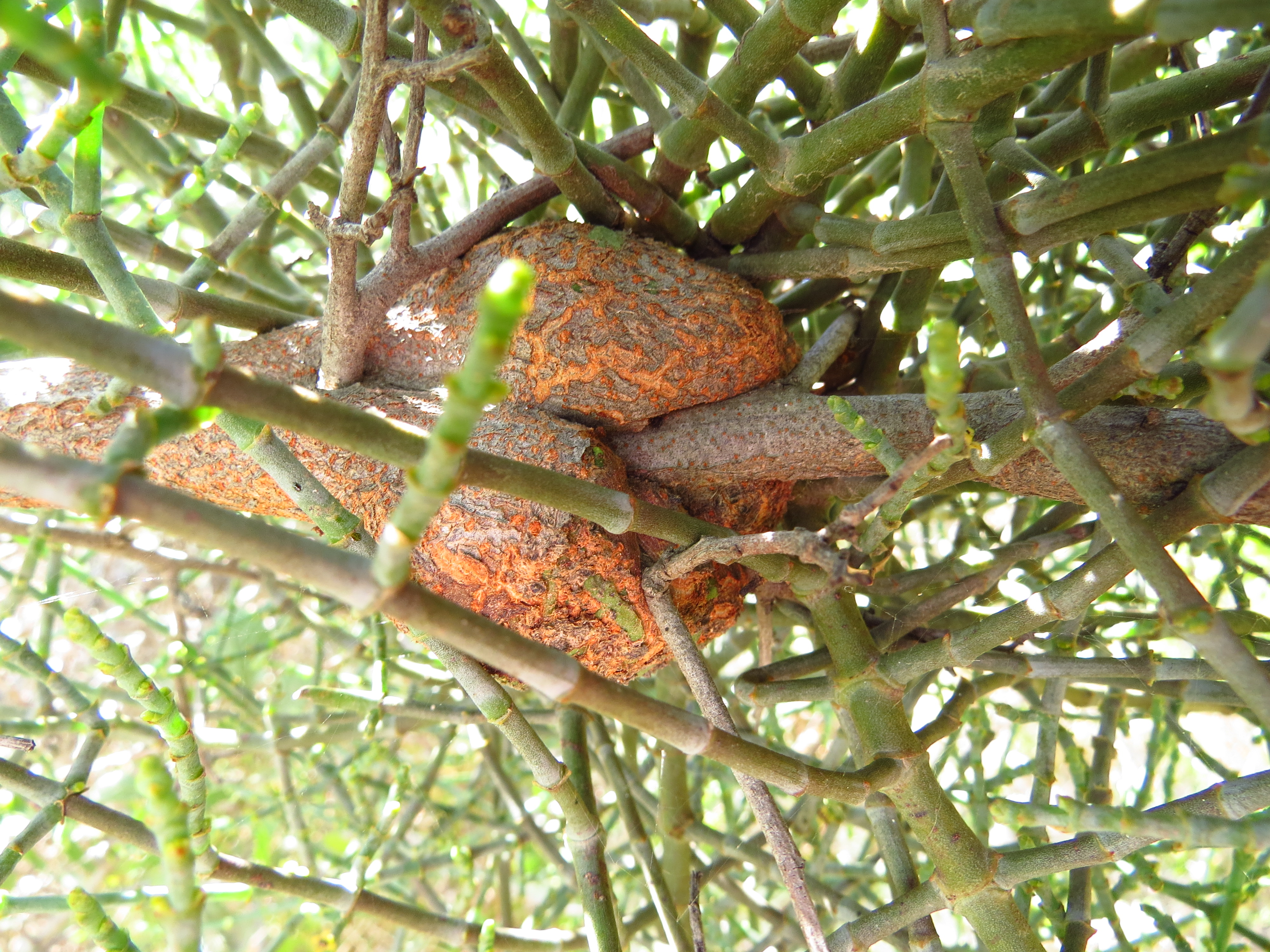
The swollen haustorium of Viscum capense renders the end of the branch stunted compared to the lower part of the branch.

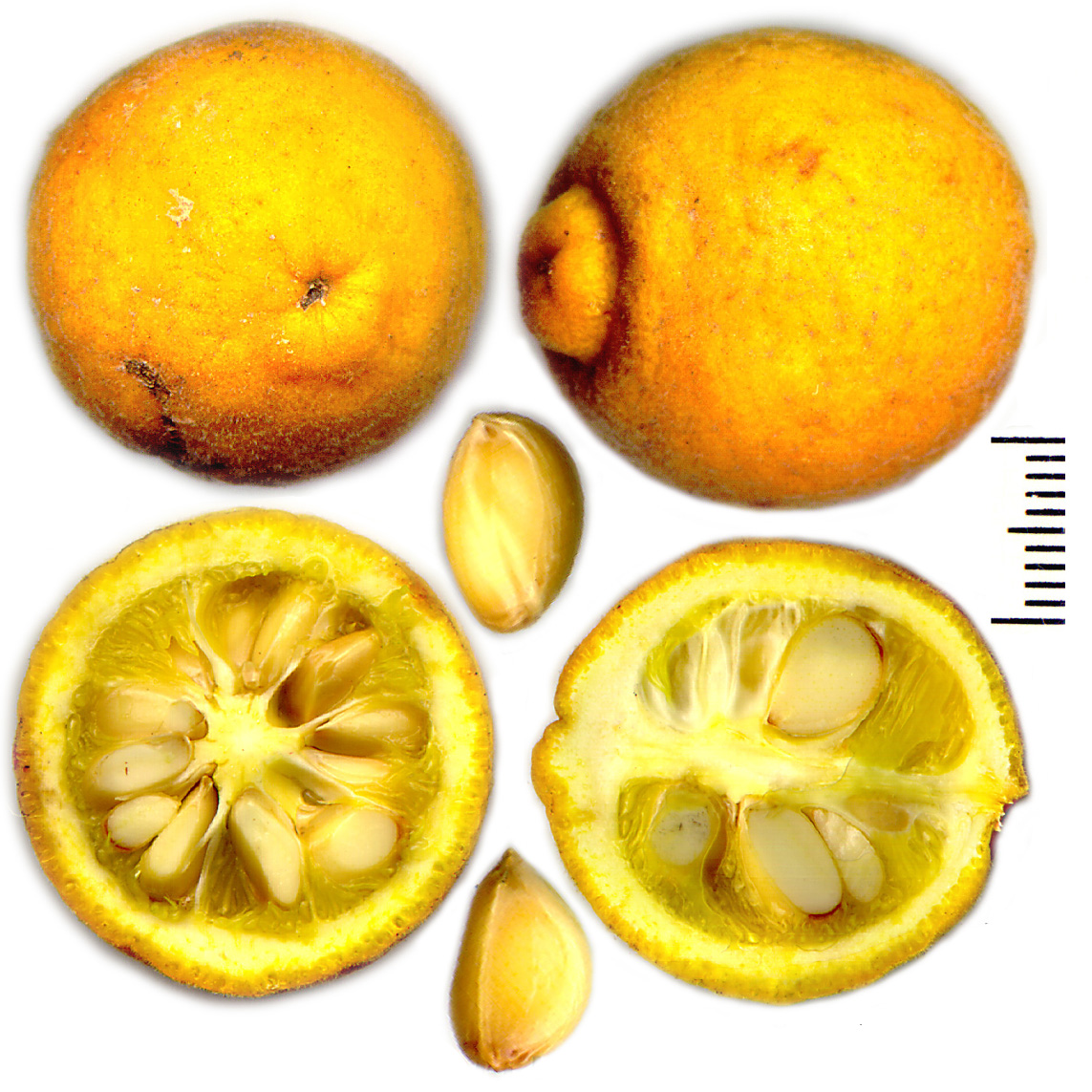
The fruit of Poncirus is a typical hesperidium.

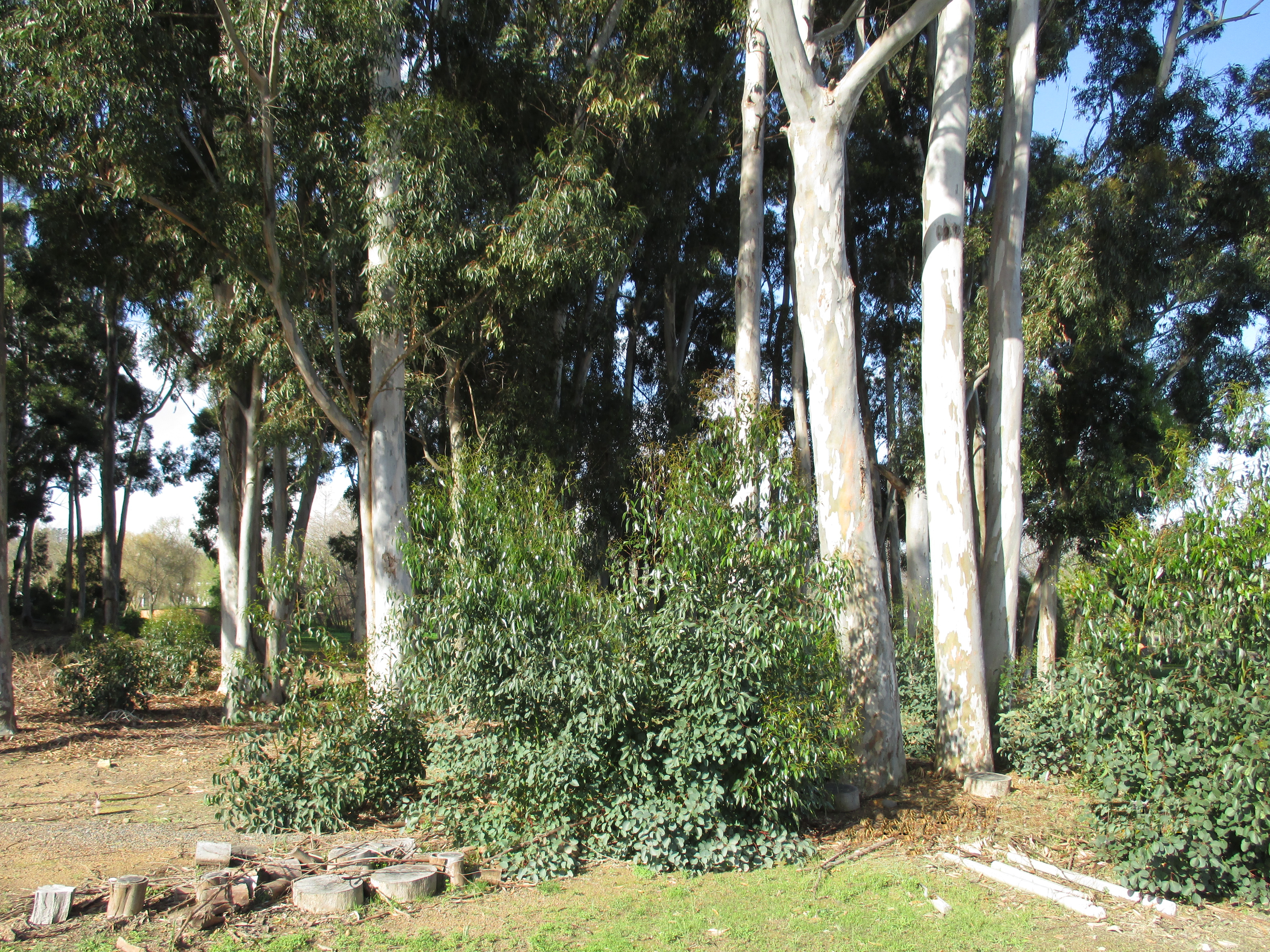
Heteroblastic growth is common in Eucalyptus species with leaves that are isobilateral in the mature tree; they generally start life with dorsiventral leaves. Some of these saplings are in the transient stage in which they have both forms of leaves, dorsiventral on lower branches, and isobilateral above.

habit
The general external appearance of a plant, including size, shape, texture, and orientation.
habitat
The place where a plant lives; the environmental conditions of its home.
hair
A single elongated cell or row of cells borne on the surface of an organ.
half-inferior ovary
An ovary partly below and partly above the level of attachment of the other floral parts. Compare inferior ovary and superior ovary.
halonate
Having a transparent coating, or being of a spore's outer layer.
halophyte
A plant adapted to living in highly saline habitats; a plant that accumulates high concentrations of salt in its tissues.
hand-pollination
The controlled act of pollination that excludes the possibility of open-pollination.
haploid
Having one set of chromosomes, e.g. the complement of chromosomes in each of the cells of the gametophyte, the nucleus of a gamete, and the spores. This is expressed symbolically as n, where n = the gametic number of chromosomes. Compare diploid, triploid, and tetraploid.
haplostemonous
Having a single series of stamens equal in number to the proper number of petals, and alternating with them. Compare diplostemonous and obdiplostemonous.
harmomegathy
process by which pollen grains in arid environments close off their apertures to avoid losing water
hastate
Triangular in outline, the basal lobes pointing outward, so that the base appears truncate; may refer only to the base of a leaf with such lobes. Compare sagittate, which refers to basal lobes pointing backward.
haustorium
In parasitic plants, a structure developed for penetrating the host's tissues.
head
See capitulum, a pseudanthium.
heathland
Vegetation dominated by small shrubs which usually have ericoid leaves.
helicoid
Coiled; of a cymose inflorescence, when the branching is repeatedly on the same side (the apex is often recurved). Compare scorpioid.
heliophilous
Requiring or tolerating strong, direct sunlight.
hemerochory
A plant that has been transported voluntarily or involuntarily by humans in a territory which it could not have colonized by its own natural mechanisms of dissemination, or at least much more slowly.
hemi-legume
A legume fruit in which the seed or seeds and one valve of the pod are dispersed as a unit. The valve catches the wind and blows away with the seeds, as in Acacia tenuifolia and Peltogyne paniculata.
herb
Any vascular plant that does not develop a woody stem at any point during its life cycle, e.g. a daffodil.
herbaceous
Not woody; usually green and soft in texture.
herbarium

A collection of preserved, usually pressed and dried, plant material used for identification and comparison; also a building in which such collections are stored.
herkogamy

A flower with parts arranged so that pollen from the anthers is unlikely to be transferred to the stigma without assistance of a pollinator.
hermaphrodite
A synonym of bisexual.
hesperidium
A form of berry that occurs most familiarly in the genus Citrus. The fruit tends to be large for a berry, ranging from not much more than a centimeter in small fruited genera such as Murraya, to 15 cm or more in some varieties of Citrus. The outer rind typically is thick and tough with many oil glands, while the carpels within are packed with juicy fibers.
heteroblastic
Having parts, especially leaves, that are distinctly different between the juvenile and adult stages.
heterophyllous
Having more than one leaf type on the same plant. For example, leaves adapted to the open air and leaves adapted to being under water in Ranunculus aquatilis.
heterophylly
A condition in which a plant has two or more types of leaves that differ in form and/or function.
heteromorphic
Having two or more distinct morphologies (e.g. of different size and shape). Compare isomorphic.
heterospory
The production of spores of two different sizes (small and large) by the sporophytes of land plants. Compare homospory.
heterostyly
The condition of a species having flowers with different style and stamen lengths, but with all the flowers of any one plant being identical. See distyly.
hilum
The scar on a seed coat where it separates from its stalk (funicle).
hip
The fruit of a rose plant.
hippocrepiform
Horseshoe-shaped.
hirsute
Bearing coarse, rough, longish hairs. See indumentum.
hispid
Bearing long, erect, rigid hairs or bristles, harsh to touch.
hoary
Covered with a greyish to whitish layer of very short, closely interwoven hairs, giving a frosted appearance.
holotype
A type chosen by the author of a name. Compare lectotype.
homochlamydeous
Having a perianth which is not divided into a separate calyx and corolla. Contrast dichlamydeous.
homospory
The production of spores of only one size by the sporophytes of land plants. Compare heterospory.
hort.

Of gardens, an author citation used in two ways:
1. as a name misapplied by gardeners
2. as an invalid name derived from horticultural writings of confused authorship.
husk
Protective outer covering of certain seeds, for example, the leafy outer covering of an ear of maize (corn), the leathery covering of the walnut, or the spiky covering of the chestnut.
hyaline
Translucent; usually delicately membranous and colorless.
hybrid
Plant produced by the crossing of parents belonging to two different named groups, e.g. genera, species, varieties, subspecies, forma and so on; i.e. the progeny resulting within and between two different plants. An F1 hybrid is the primary product of such a cross. An F2 hybrid is a plant arising from a cross between two F1 hybrids (or from the self-pollination of an F1 hybrid).
hybrid formula
The names of the parents of a hybrid joined by a multiplication sign, e.g. Cytisus ardonoi × C. purgans.
hydrophily
Form of pollination whereby pollen is distributed by the flow of waters.
hypanthium
Tube or cup-like structure in a flower that includes the bases of sepals, petals, and stamens, and may or may not be connected (adnate) to the ovary.
hyper-resupinate
In botany, describing leaves or flowers that are in the usual position but are borne on a petiole or pedicel that is twisted 360 degrees. The term is used to describe organs, such as orchid flowers, that are usually resupinate. Compare resupinate.
hypocarpium
Enlarged fleshy structure that forms below the fruit from the receptacle or hypanthium.
hypocotyl
Of an embryo or seedling, the part of the plant axis below the cotyledon and node, but above the root. It marks the transition from root to stem development.
hypocrateriform
Salver-shaped. Synonym of salverform. From Greek kratḗrion: a vessel.
hypogynous
Borne below the ovary; used to describe floral parts inserted below the ovary's level of insertion. Compare epigynous and perigynous.
hysteranthous
Type of growth in which new leaves appear after flowering. Also spelled histeranthous. Compare proteranthous and synanthous.
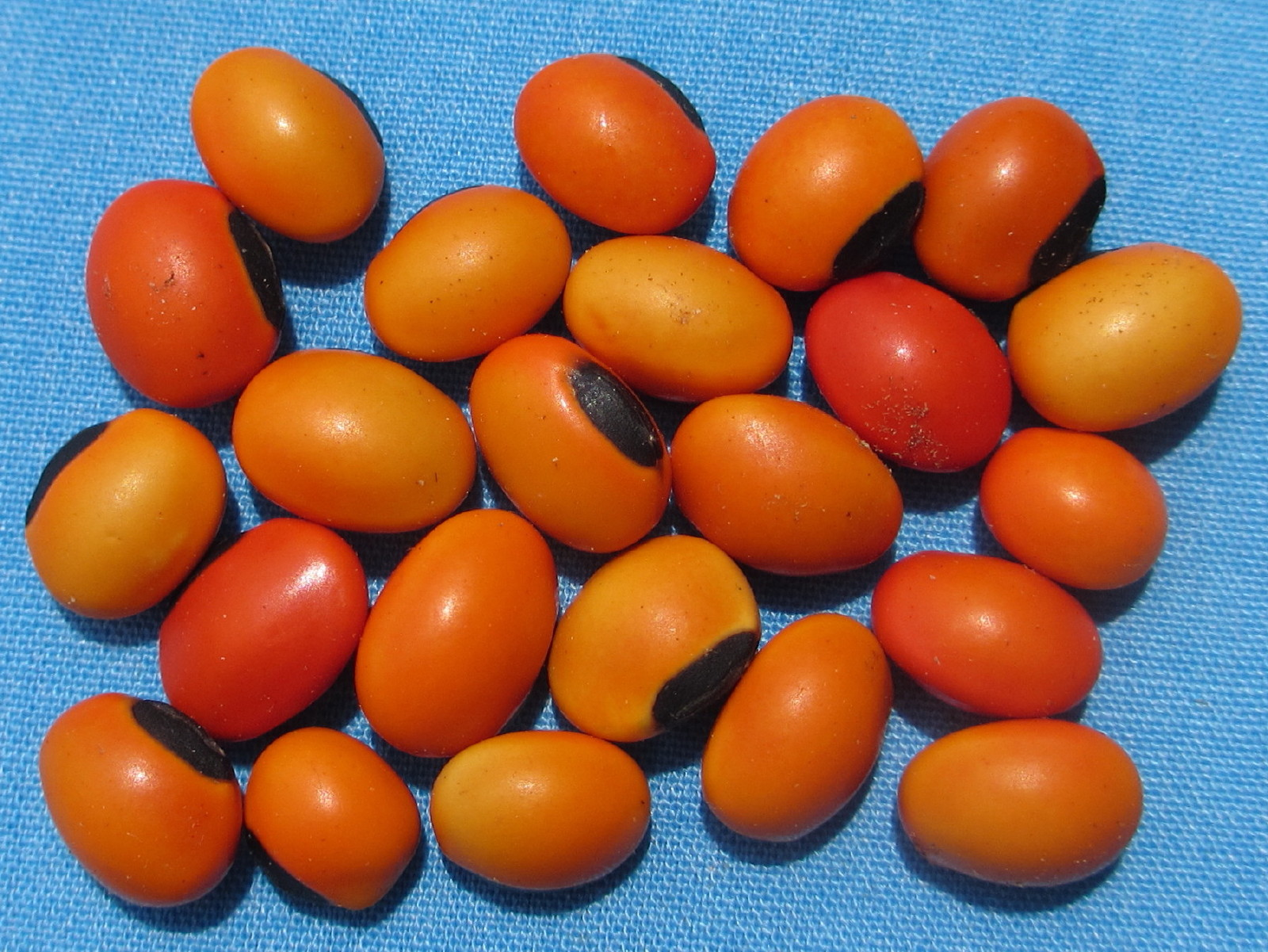
The hilum contrasts conspicuously with the rest of the testa in the seeds of many species. In the case of Erythrina species, the colors may be a warning that the seeds are poisonous.

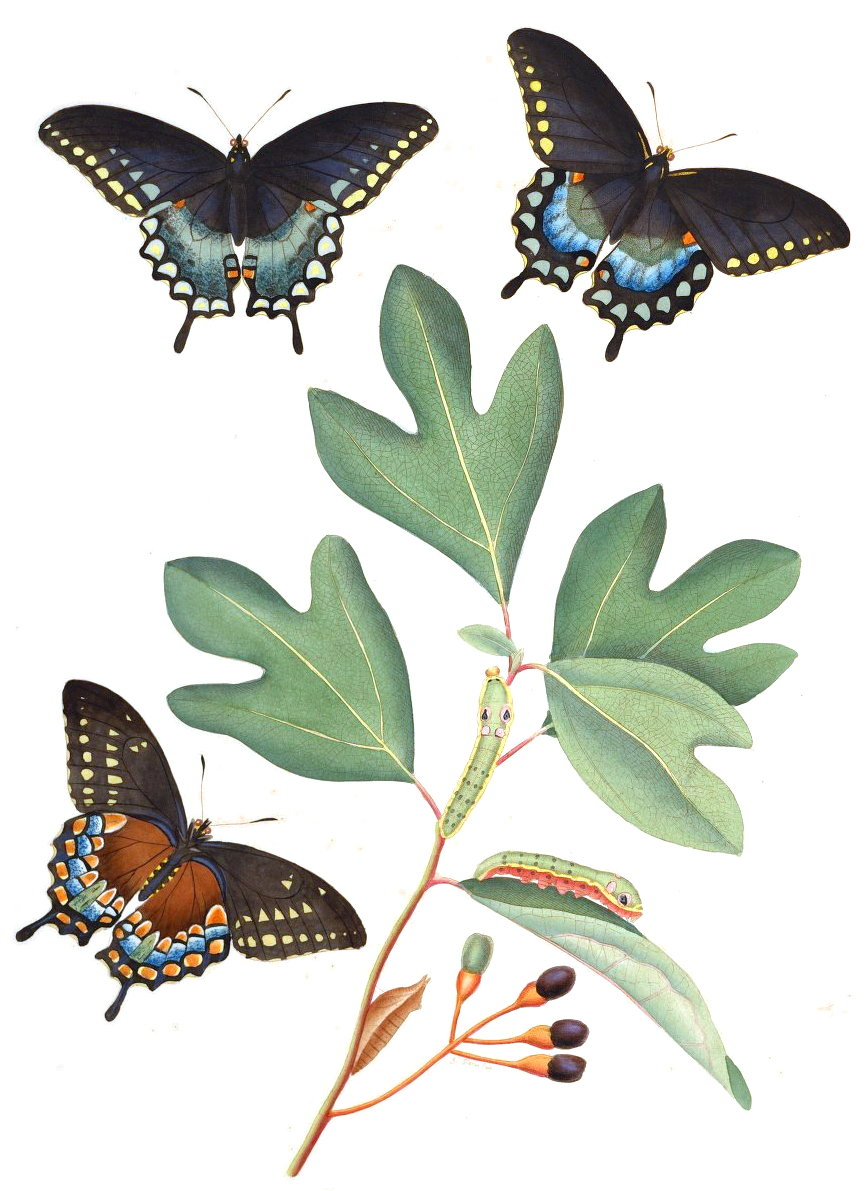
A hypocarpium forms below the fruits of Sassafras albidum.

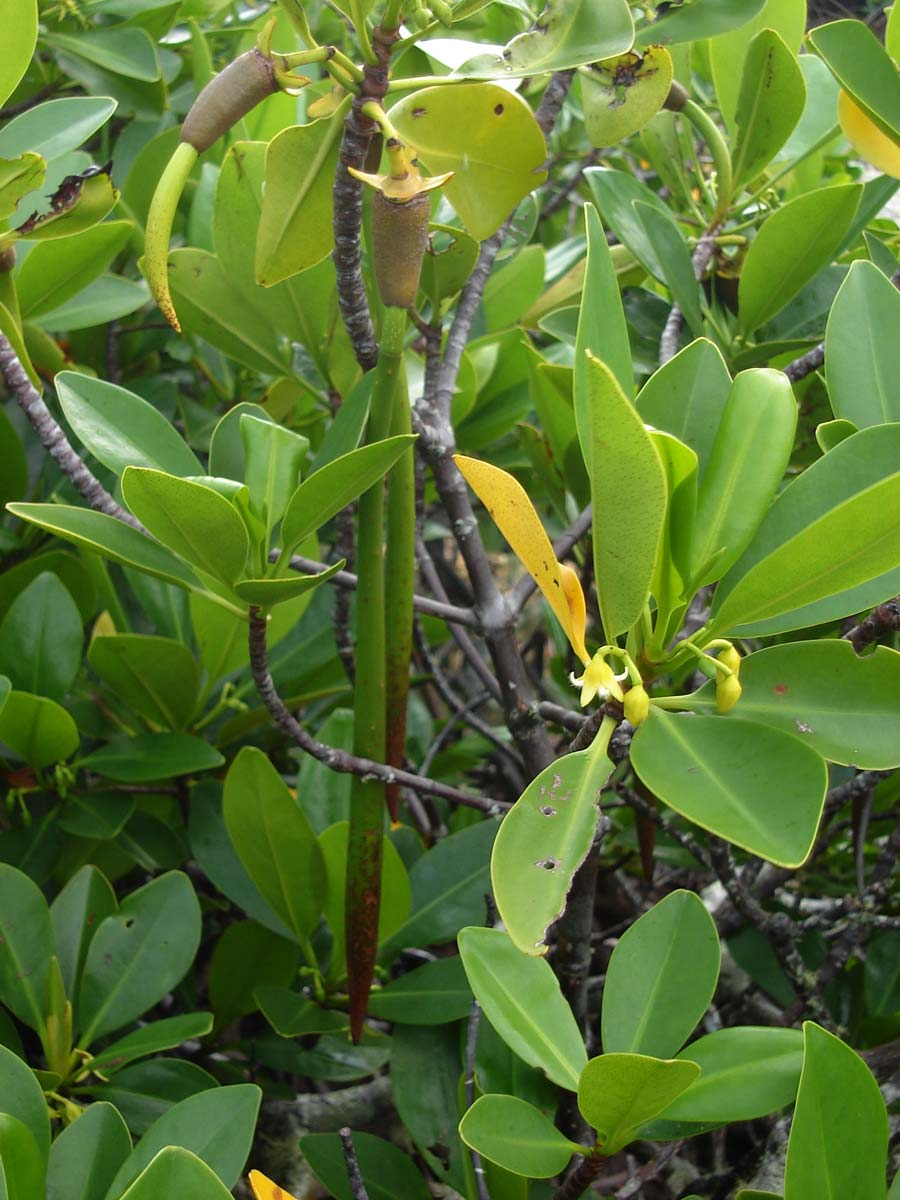
Flowers, fruit and propagule of a Rhizophora "mangle" or mangrove. The apparent root of the propagule is in fact meristematic tissue developing from the hypocotyl. The new plant develops largely from this tissue, especially if it has successfully penetrated into mud in which the new plant can establish itself.

== I ==
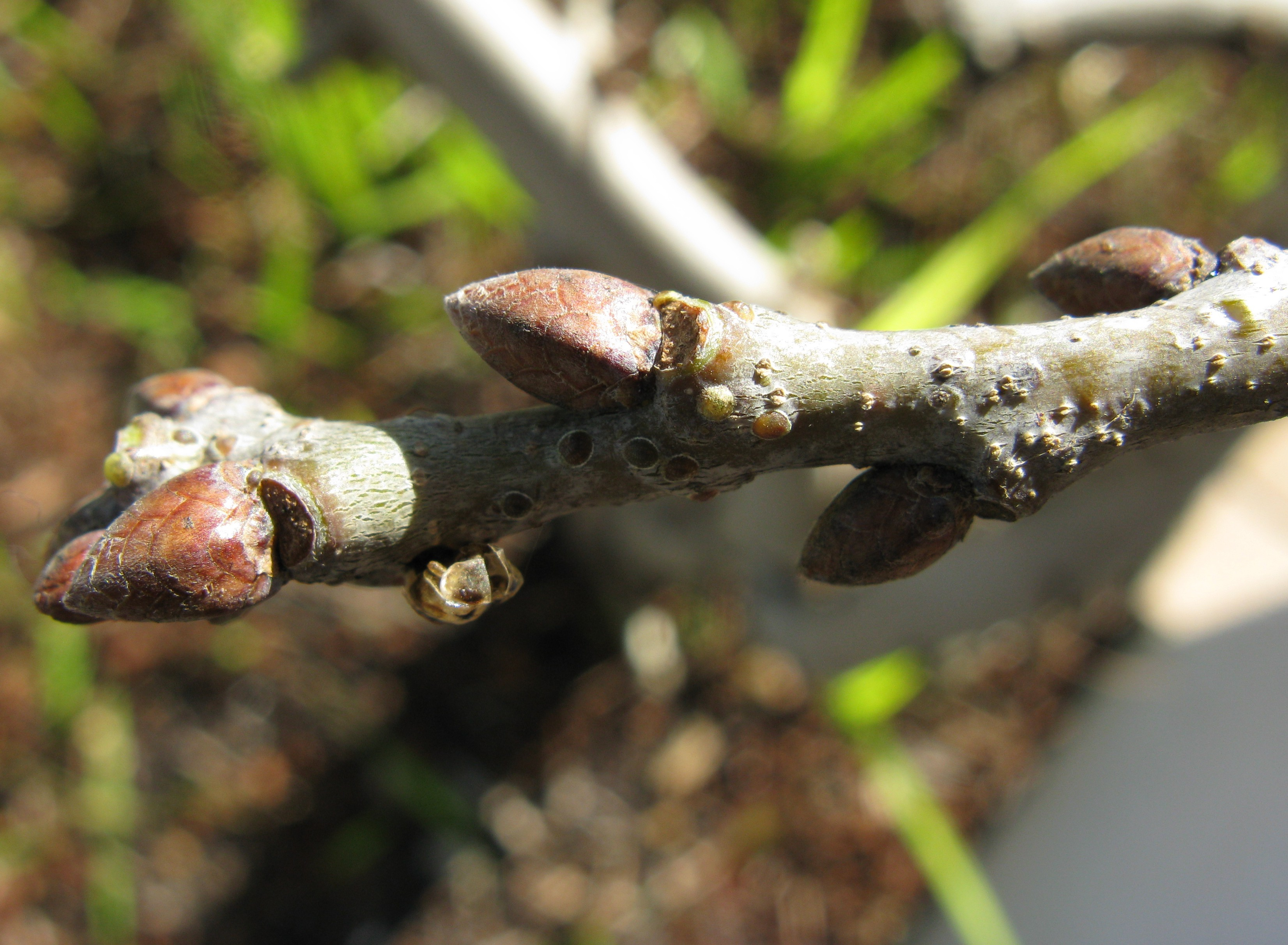
Imbricate protective cataphylls on dormant buds of Quercus robur

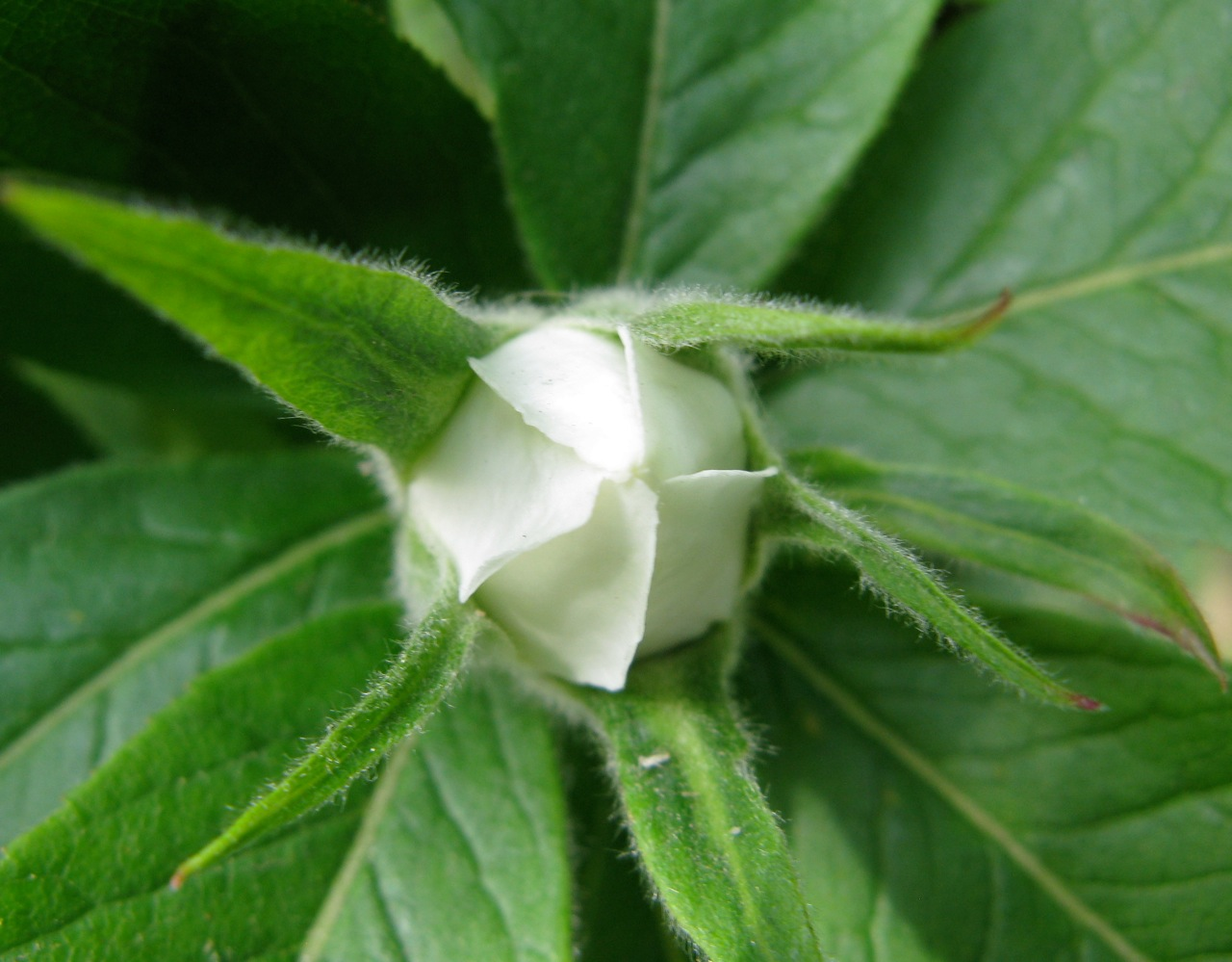
Petals of Mespilus germanica are imbricate before the flower opens.

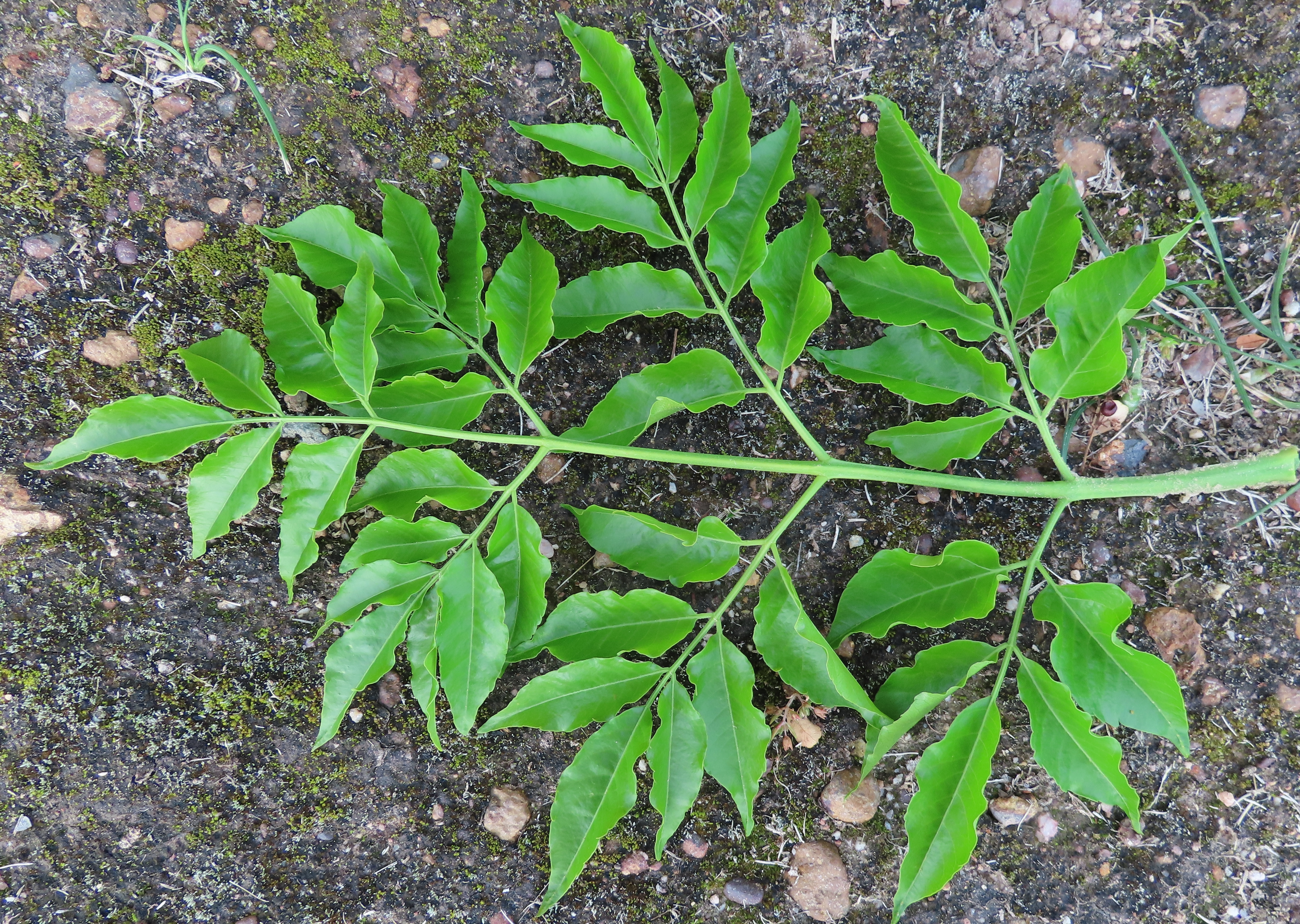
Doubly imparipinnate compound leaf of Melia azedarach

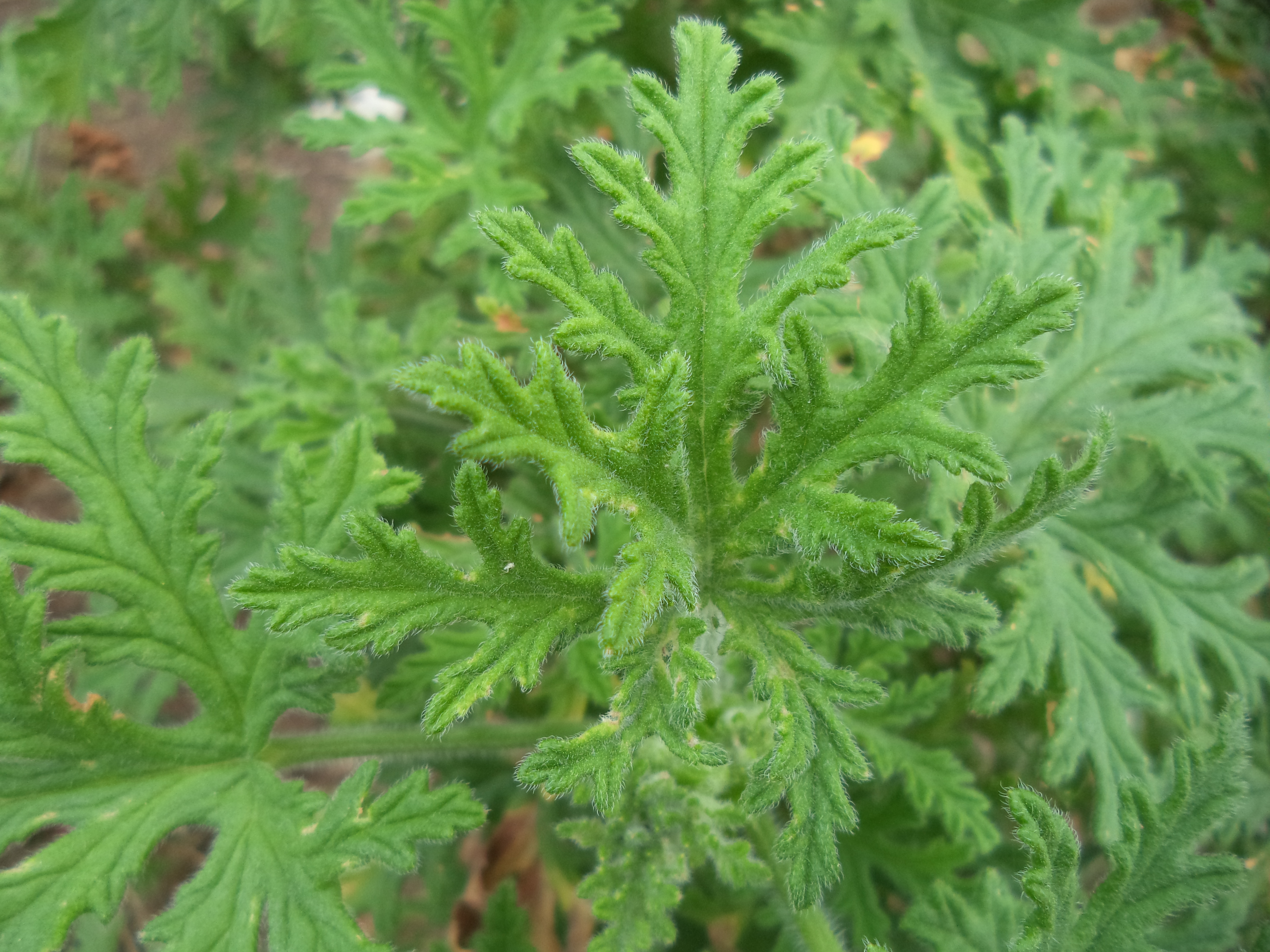
Deeply incised leaves of Pelargonium graveolens

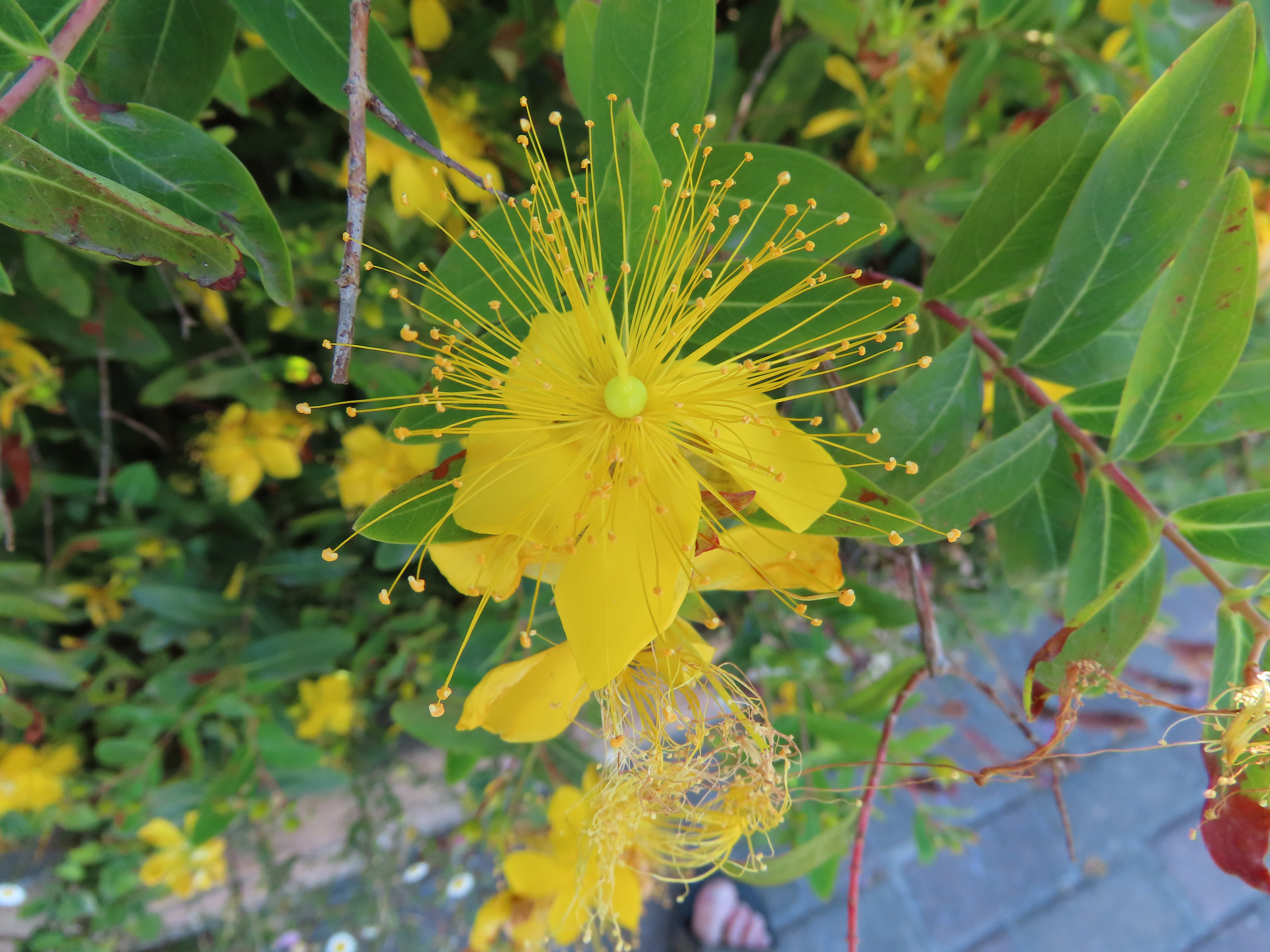
Indefinite stamens of Hypericum

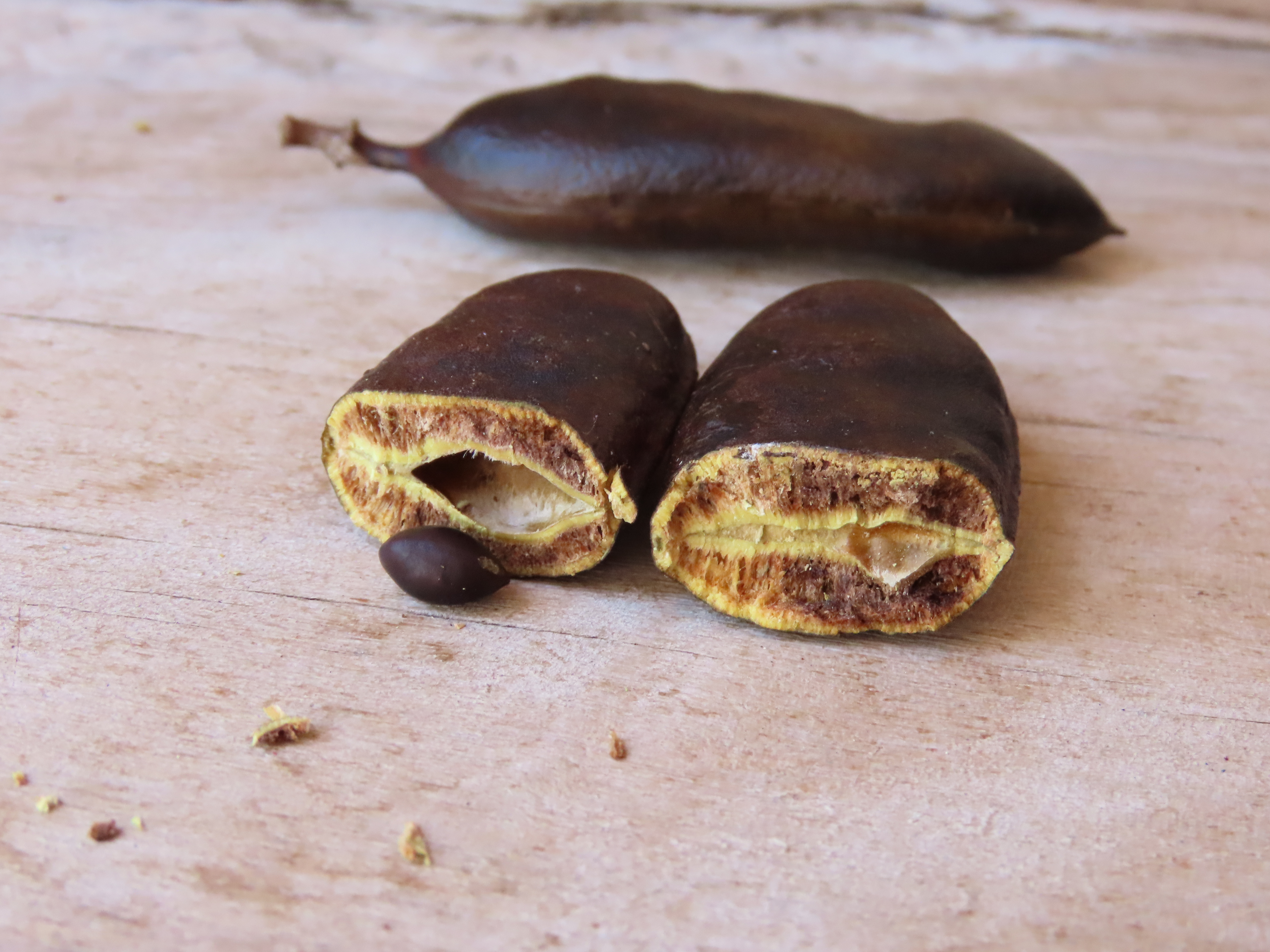
Indehiscent pods of Libidibia ferrea; unlike most Fabaceae species, the plant depends on the pods being crushed by large ungulates to disperse the seeds.

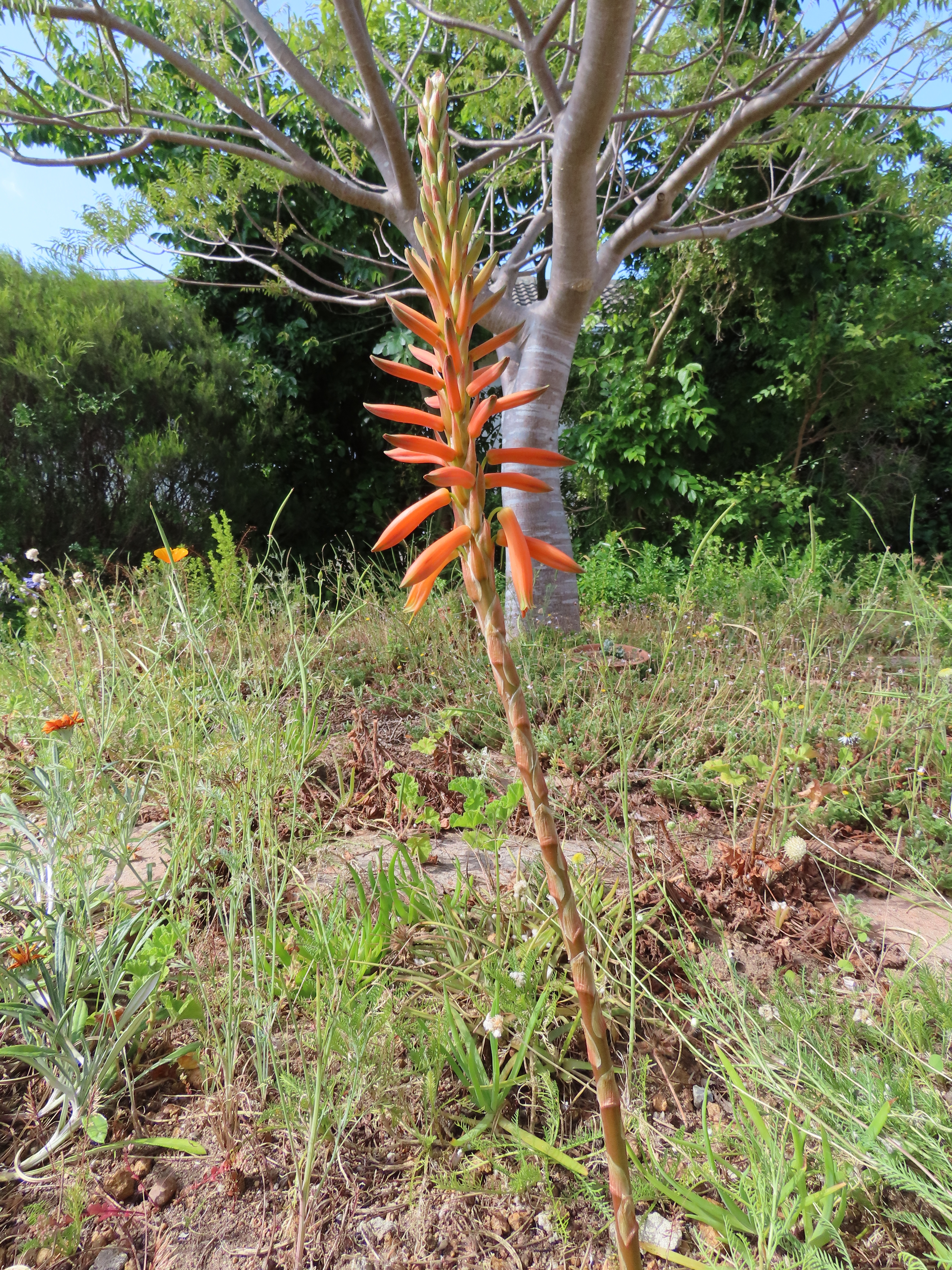
Aloe brevifolia bears an indeterminate raceme.

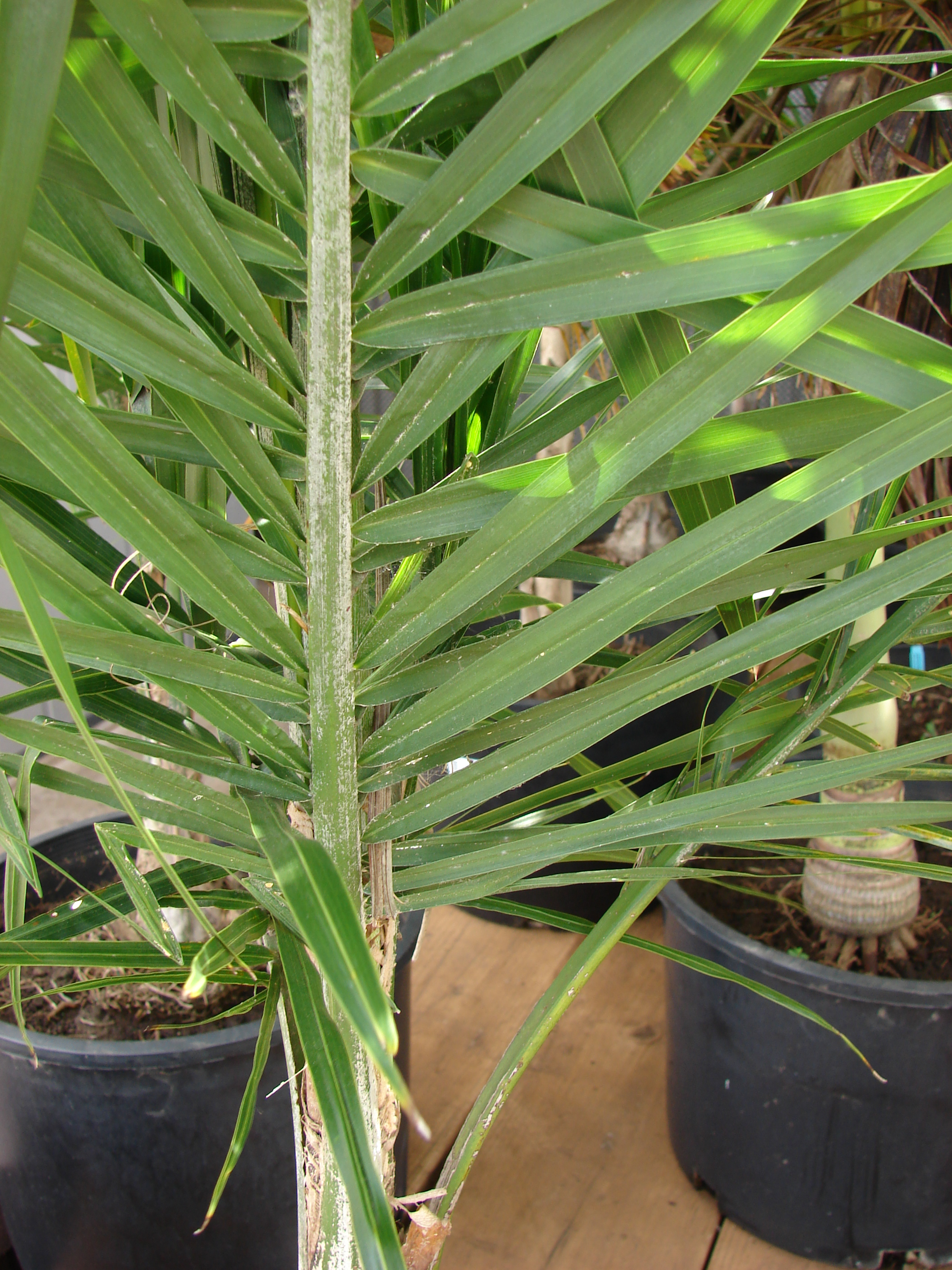
The leaves of Syagrus palms are induplicately folded, in contrast to many other palm genera with reduplicate leaves.

idioblast
A cell, especially of a leaf, differing markedly from surrounding cells. They often synthesise specialized products such as crystals.
illegitimate name (nomen illeg.)
A name not abiding by the rules of the botanical Codes, e.g. later homonyms, cultivars that have been Latinised after 1 Jan 1959; cultivar names with more than 10 syllables or 30 letters; cultivar names that use confusing names of other plants, e.g. Camellia 'Rose'.
imbricate
From the Latin for "tiled". Overlapping each other; of perianth parts, edges overlapping in the bud (the convoluted arrangement is a special form of imbrication). Dormant buds of many deciduous species are imbricately covered with protective cataphylls called bud scales. Compare with subimbricates meaning lightly overlapping
imparipinnate
A pinnate leaf with an odd number of pinnae (terminated by a single leaflet). Compare paripinnate.
in
In nomenclature, where the preceding author published the name in an article or book, authored or edited by the succeeding author.
-inae
The suffix added to the stem of a generic name to form the name of a subtribe: for instance, Corydalinae from Corydalis + -inae.
inbreeding
The production of offspring between closely related parents leading to a high degree of similarity; self-fertilization is the most intense form of inbreeding.
incertae sedis
Of unknown taxonomic affinity; relationships obscure.
incised
Cut deeply and (usually) unevenly (a condition intermediate between toothed and lobed).
included
Enclosed, not protruding, e.g. stamens within the corolla.
incomplete flower
A flower which lacks one or more of its usual parts, such as carpels, sepals, petals, pistils, or stamens.
incurved
Bent or curved inward; of leaf margins, when curved toward the adaxial side.
ined.
An abbreviation of Latin inedita, an unpublished work. Used to indicate that a botanical name appeared only in a manuscript that was not published, so the name is invalid.
indefinite
variable in number, and as a rule numerous, e.g. more than twice as many stamens as petals or sepals, but no particular standard number of stamens. In another usage it is a synonym for the preferable term indeterminate, meaning the condition in which an inflorescence is not terminated by a flower, but continues growing until limited by physiological factors. Compare numerous. Contrast definite.
indehiscent
Not opening in any definite manner at maturity; usually referring to fruit. Contrast dehiscent.
indeterminate
usually referring to a stem or inflorescence in which there is no particular terminal bud or meristem that stops growth and ends the extension of the stem, which continues until physiological factors stop the growth. Racemes of some Xanthorrhoeaceae, such as many Aloes, and of many Iridaceae, such as Watsonias, are indeterminate. Contrast determinate.
indigenous
Native to the area, not introduced, and not necessarily confined to the region discussed or present throughout it (hardly distinct from 'native' but usually applied to a smaller area). For example, the Cootamundra Wattle is native to Australia but indigenous to the Cootamundra region of southern New South Wales. Compare endemic.
indumentum
Collective term for a surface covering of any kind of trichomes, e.g. hairs, scales.
induplicate
Folded upward, or folded with the two adaxial surfaces together.
indusium
1. Membrane covering the sori of some ferns.
2. Cup enclosing the stigma in Goodeniaceae.
inferior ovary
An ovary at least partly below the level of attachment of other floral parts. Compare superior ovary and half-inferior ovary.
inflated
Swollen, like a bladder.
inflexed
Bent sharply upward or forward. Compare deflexed.
inflorescence
several flowers closely grouped together to form an efficient structured unit; the grouping or arrangement of flowers on a plant.
infraspecific
denotes taxonomic ranks below species level, for example subspecies.
infrageneric
denoting taxonomic ranks below the genus level, for example, subgenera, sections, and series.
infructescence
the grouping or arrangement of fruits on a plant.
infundibular (infundibuliform)
funnel-shaped, for example in the corolla of a flower.
inrolled
rolled inward.
insectivorous
catching, and drawing nutriment from, insects.
insertion, point of
The point at which one organ or structure (such as a leaf) is joined to the structure which bears it (such as a stem).
inserted
growing out from
integument
in general, any covering, but especially the covering of an ovule.
intercalary
(e.g. of growth) occurring between the apex and the base of an organ
intercalary meristem
a meristem located between the apex and the base of an organ
interjugary glands
in pinnate leaves, glands occurring along the leaf rachis between the pinnae (occurring below the single, and often slightly larger, gland at or just below the insertion of the pinnae). Compare jugary.
internode
The portion of a stem between two nodes.
interpetiolar
(of stipules) Between the petioles of opposite leaves, e.g in Rubiaceae.
intramarginal
inside but close to the margin. For example, an intramarginal vein is one that parallels, and is very close to, the leaf margin.
intrastaminal
inside the stamens or androecium, usually referring to the location of a nectary disk.
introrse
of anther locules, with opening toward the center of flower (at least in bud). Compare extrorse and latrorse.
invalid
Use of names not validly published according to the Code, i.e. they are not strictly 'names' in the sense of the International Code of Botanical Nomenclature.
involucre
A structure surrounding or supporting, usually a head of flowers. In Asteraceae, it is the group of phyllaries (bracts) surrounding the inflorescence before opening, then supporting the cup-like receptacle on which the head of flowers sits. In Euphorbiaceae it is the cuplike structure that holds the nectar glands, nectar, and head of flowers, and sits above the bract-like cyathophyll structure. Involucres occur in Marchantiophyta, Cycads, fungi, and many other groups.
involute
Rolled inward, for example when the margins of a leaf are rolled toward the adaxial (usually upper) surface. Compare revolute.
iridescent
Having a reflective colored sheen produced by structural coloration, as in the speculum of the mirror orchid Ophrys speculum.
irregular
Not able to be divided into two equal halves through any vertical plane. See also asymmetrical. Compare zygomorphic, actinomorphic, and regular.
isobifacial
(of flat structures, especially leaves) Having both surfaces similar, usually referring to cell types or to the number and distribution of stomata.
isomerous
Having an equal number of parts in the whorls.
isomorphic
with all features morphologically similar, i.e. of similar size and shape. Compare heteromorphic.
isotomic
Having branches of equal diameter. Compare anisotomic.
iteroparity
Referring to an organism, such as a plant, that potentially reproduces repeatedly instead of dying after reproducing for the first time; the opposite of semelparity
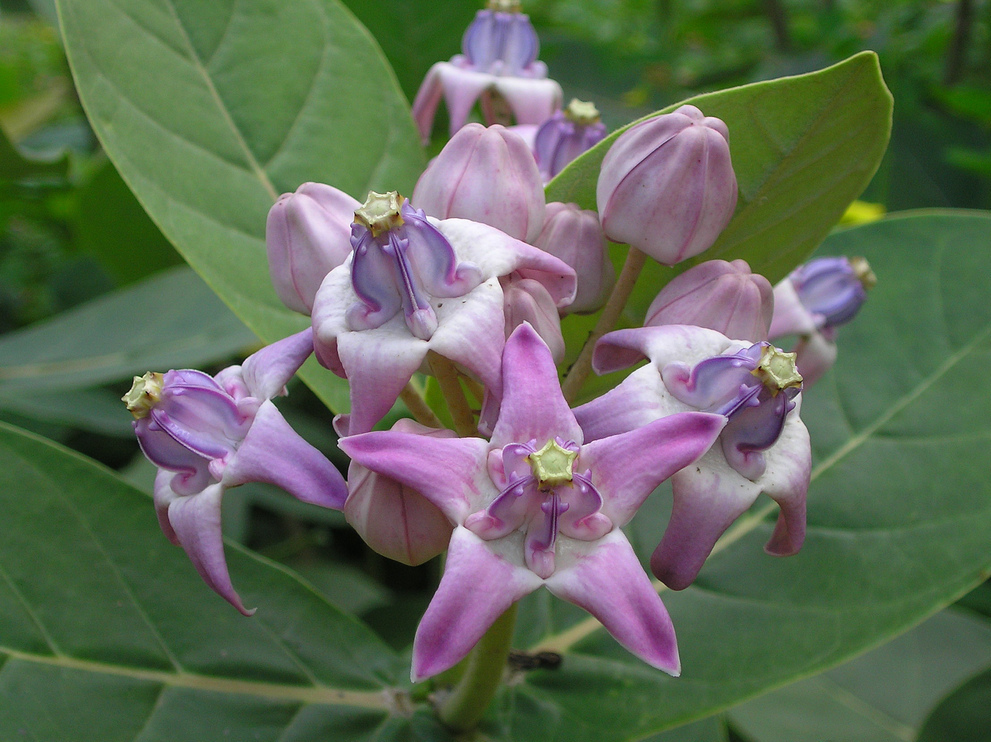
Stamens of Calotropis gigantea are inserted at the base of the corolla.

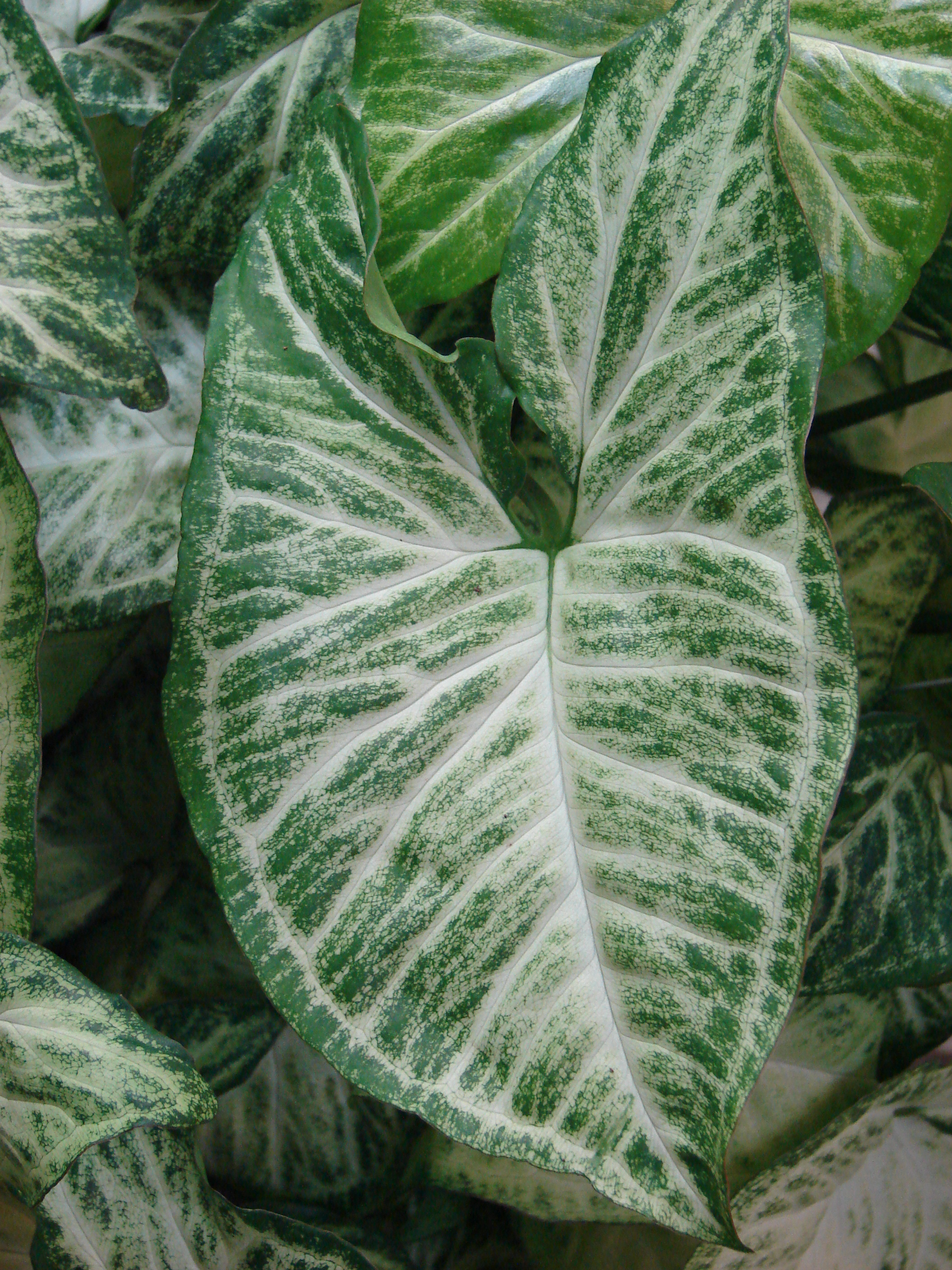
The intramarginal veins near the margins of this leaf are outlined in white.

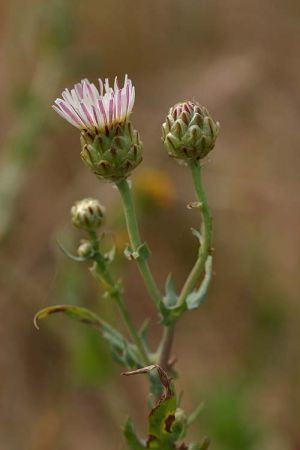
Two of these three green Asteraceae involucres encase unopened flower heads, and the third supports the open colorful head of emerging flowers. The imbricate phyllaries around the heads of this Malacothrix coulteri suggest the keeled scales of a snake, giving the plant its common name: "snake's head".

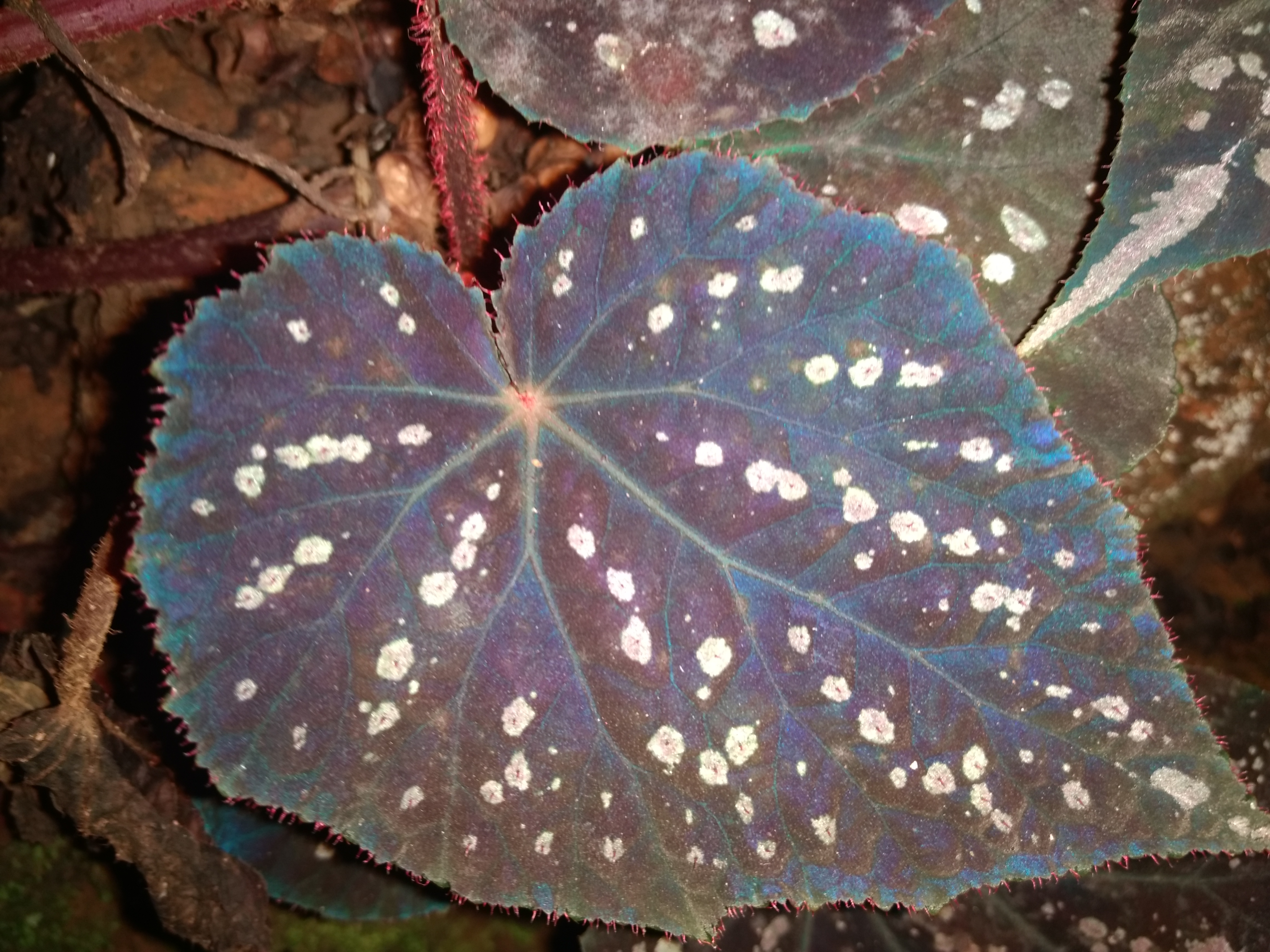
This Begonia leaf shows unusual iridescence for a plant.

== J ==
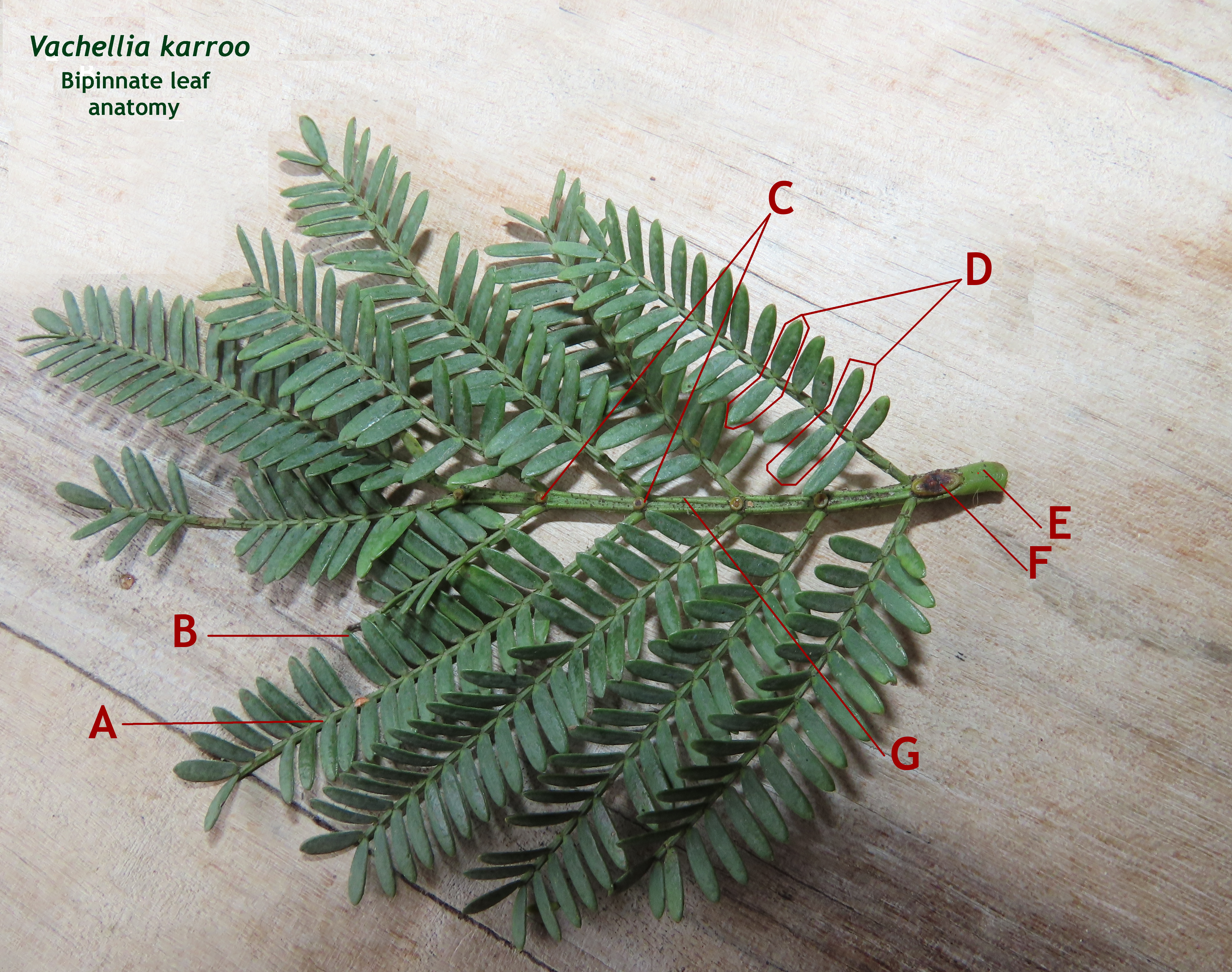
Vachellia karroo bipinnate leaf A. Rachilla B. Pinnule C. Jugary glands D. Juga (plural of jugum) E. Base of petiole F. Petiolary gland G. Rachis

joint
A node or junction of two parts; articulation.
jugary
associated with a jugum or something yoke-like; see for example jugary gland.
jugary gland
A gland occurring on the rachis of a pinnate or bipinnate leaf on a jugum, the junction or attachment of pairs of pinnae or pinnules, as in some Acacia species. Compare interjugary.
jugate
yoke-like; describing a structure of paired items joined together as in a jugum or something yoke-like, such as some leaves and fruit.
jugum
applied to various yoke-like organs, usually in the sense of their being paired, such as a pair of pinnae on a rachis.
juvenile leaves
Leaves formed on a young plant, typically differing from the adult leaves in form.
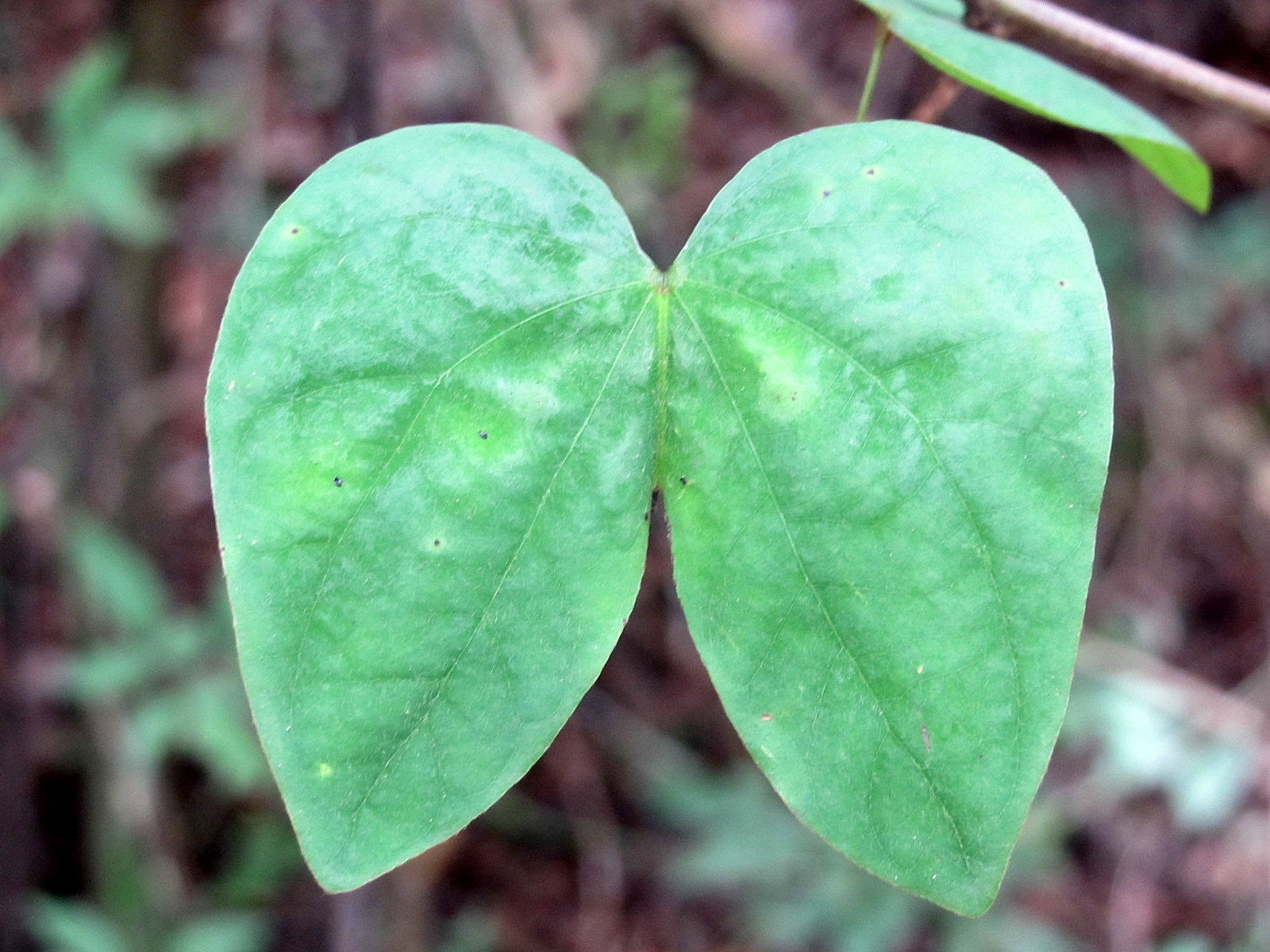
Jugate leaf of Bauhinia glabra

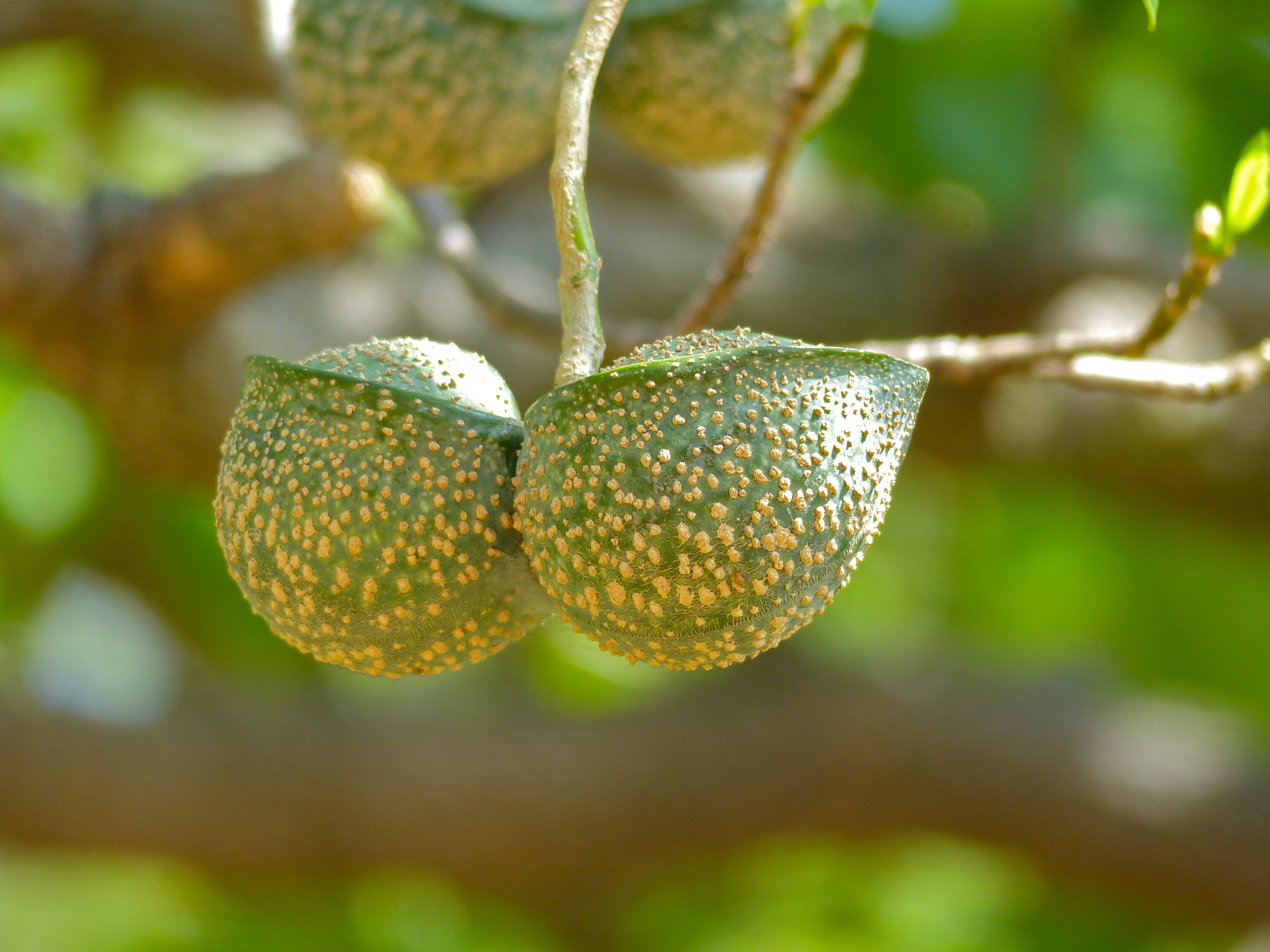
Jugate fruit of Tabernaemontana elegans

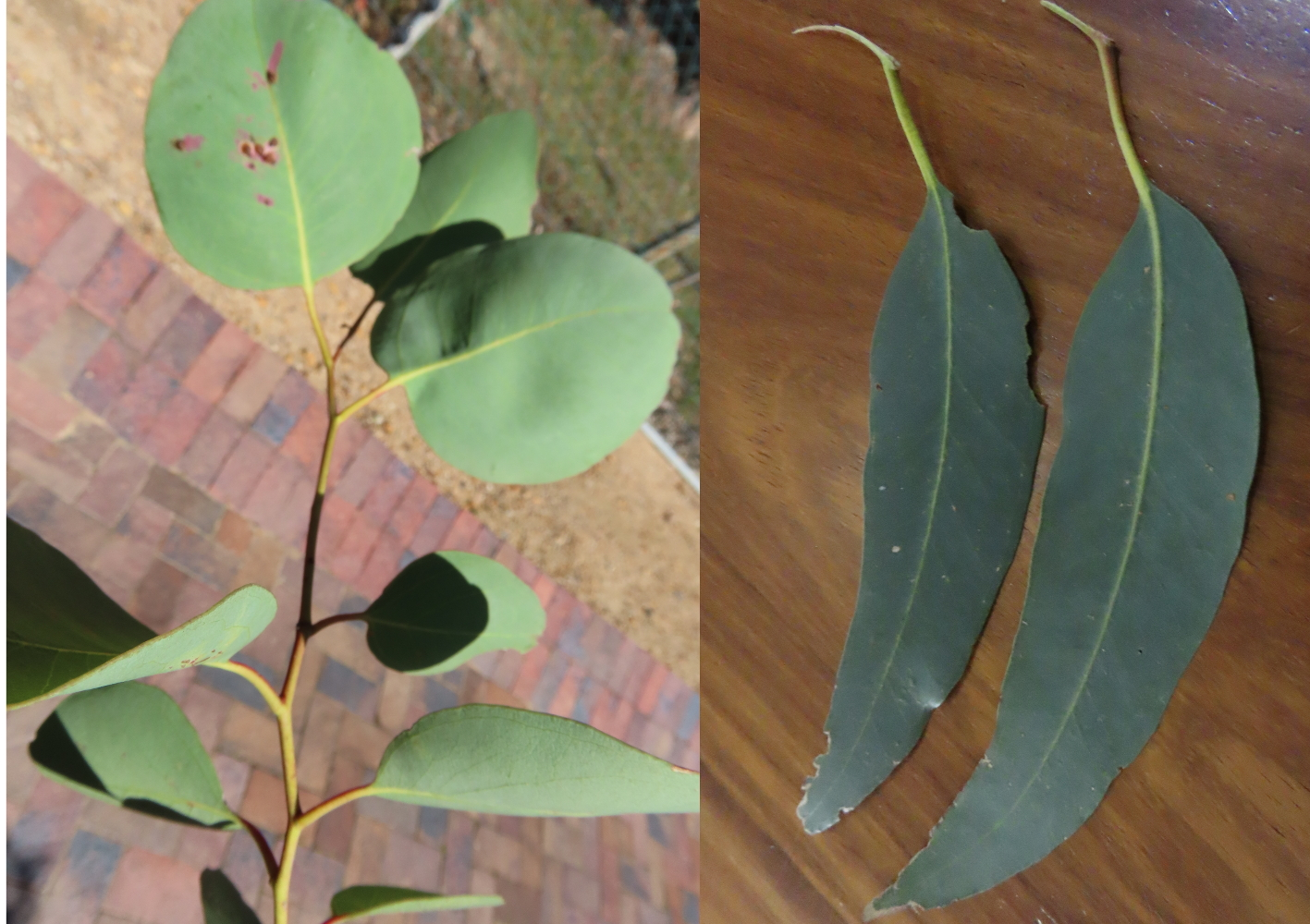
Eucalyptus camaldulensis has dorsiventral juvenile leaves (left), but isobilateral adult leaves (right).

== K ==
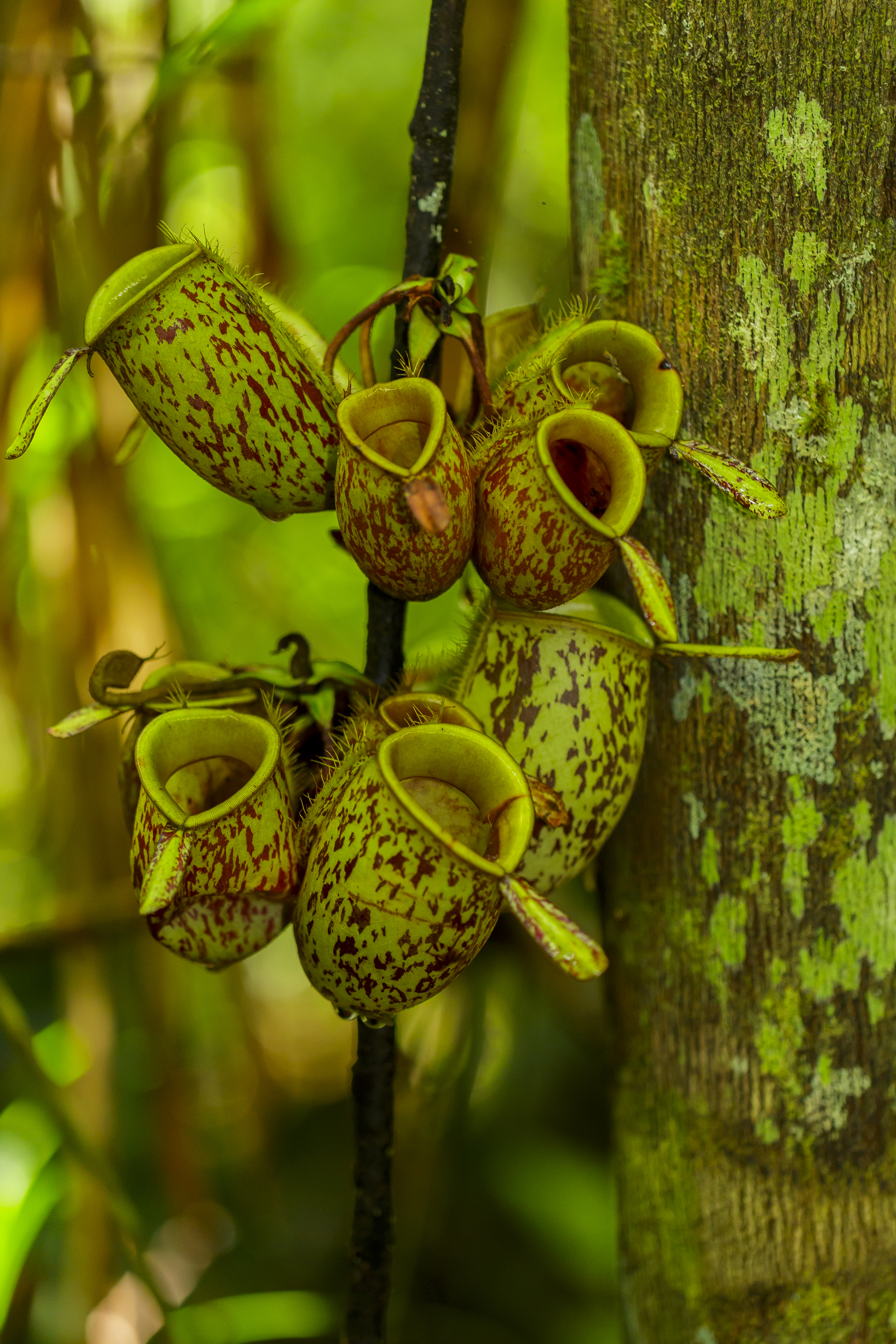
One form of the kettle traps of a pitcher plant

keel

A prominent longitudinal ridge like the keel of a boat, e.g. the structure of the corolla formed by the fusion of the lower edge of the two abaxial anterior petals of flowers in the Fabaceae.
kernel
See drupe.
kettle trap
another term for the kettle-like pitchers of any of the carnivorous pitcher plants, in which they trap their prey.
key innovation
A novel phenotypic trait that allows subsequent evolutionary radiation and success of a taxonomic group.
kidney shape
A term describing a kidney-shaped object such as a bean or a leaf; more formally, oblately cordate, or crescent-shaped with the ends rounded.
kingdom
the highest generally employed category of the taxonomic hierarchy, above that of division (phylum). The Plant Kingdom includes vascular plants, bryophytes and green algae and is also known as the clade Viridiplantae.
Klausenfrucht
Klausen or Klausenfrucht (German) is a special type of fruit in Lamiaceae and Boraginaceae. A dry, dehiscent fruit formed from a superior ovary with axil or basal placentation, with an adherent calyx, from more than one carpel and usually breaking apart into one-seeded units by separating each carpel by false septa. One unit is a half carpel. Mostly there are four units, seeds. English terms are eremocarp, schizocarp, mericarp or nutlet.
knee
abrupt bend in a root or stem, commonly at a node; a cypress knee, or pneumatophore, is a type of bend or knob in the root of some plants, especially some species in the genus Taxodium, that shows as a projection of the root above ground level or mud level.

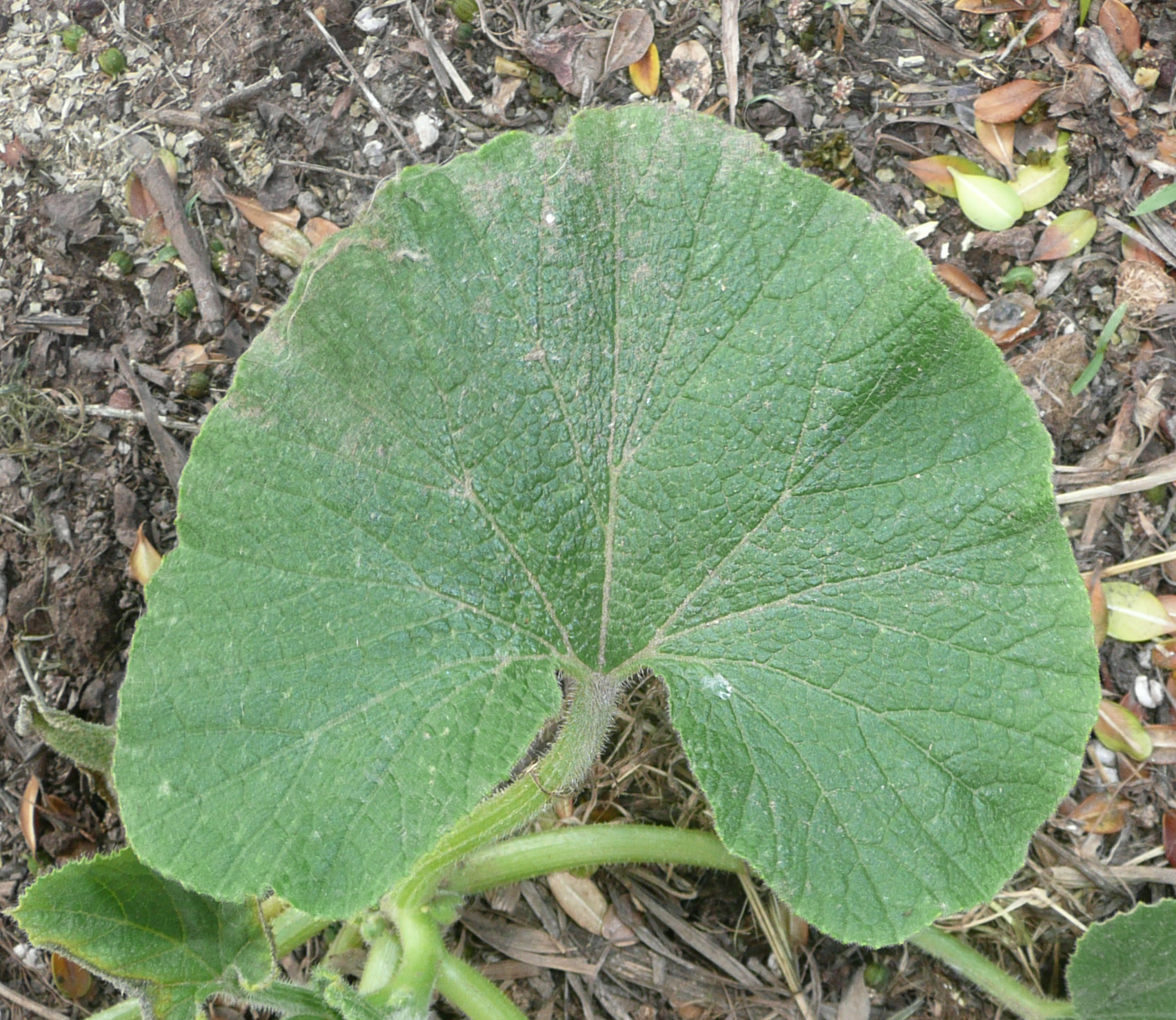
Kidney-shaped leaf of Cucurbita maxima

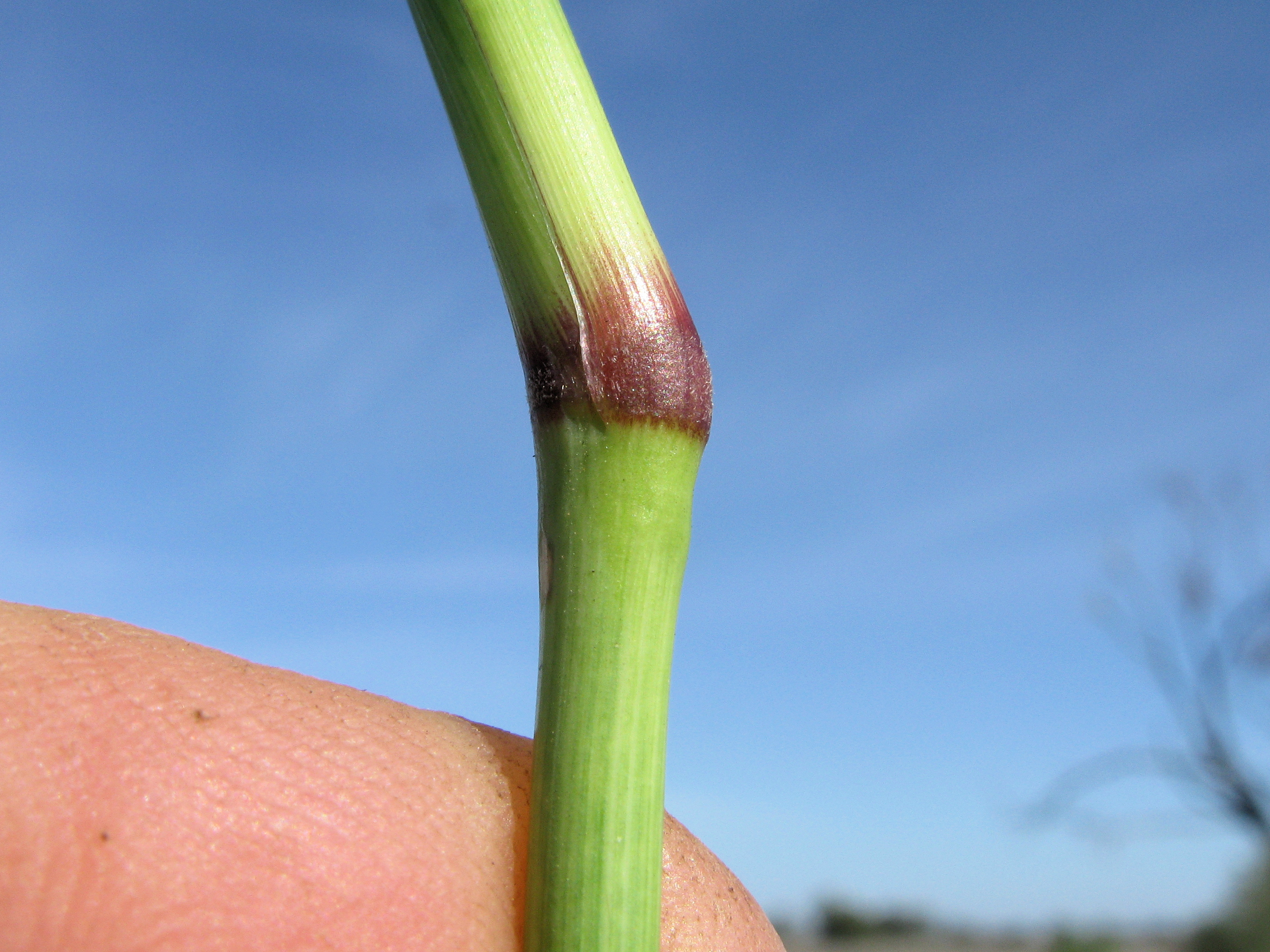
Typical knee at a node in a grass stem

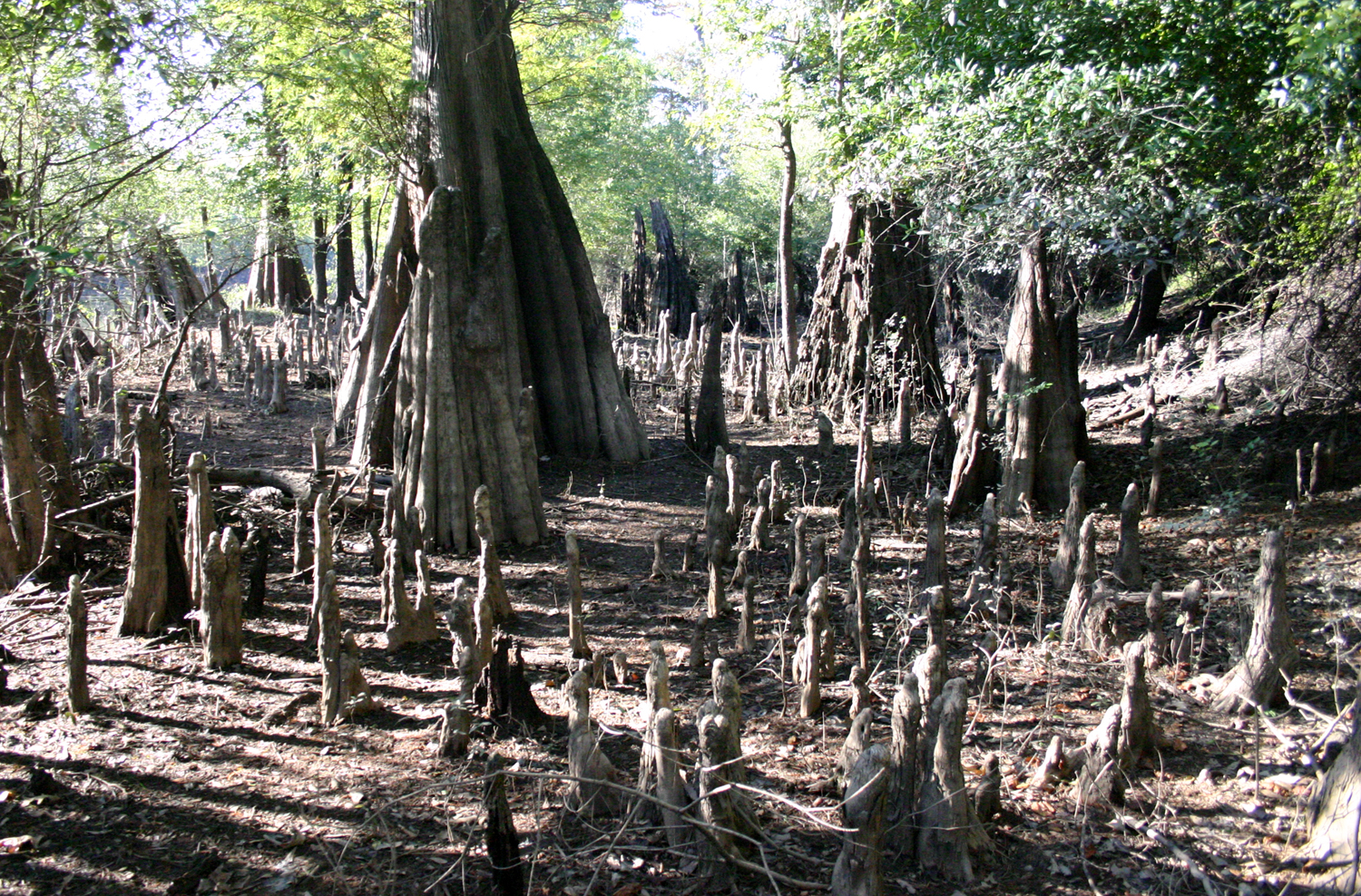
Unusually dense stand of Taxodium distichum knees around the parent tree

== L ==
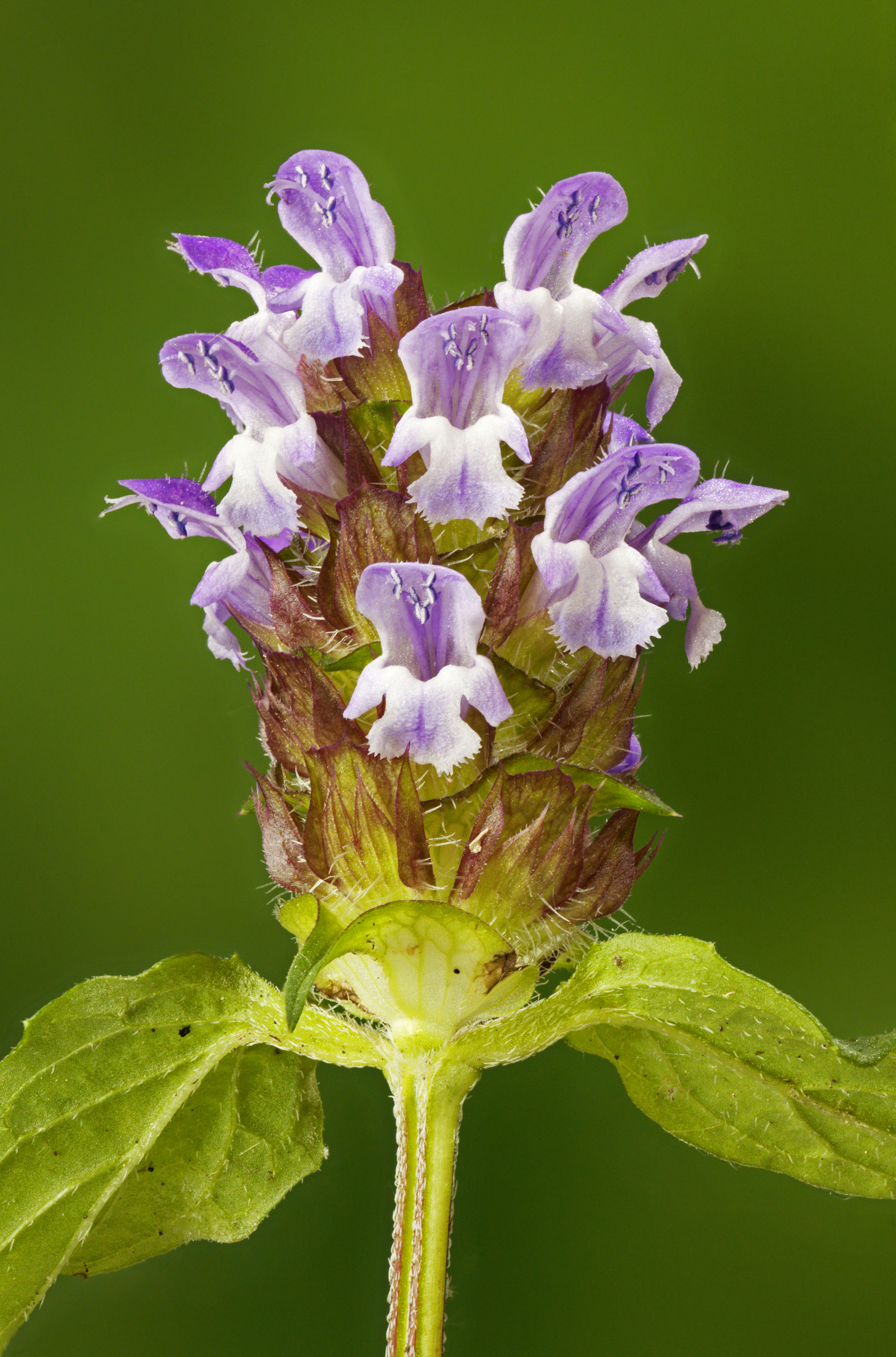
Labiate flowers of Prunella vulgaris

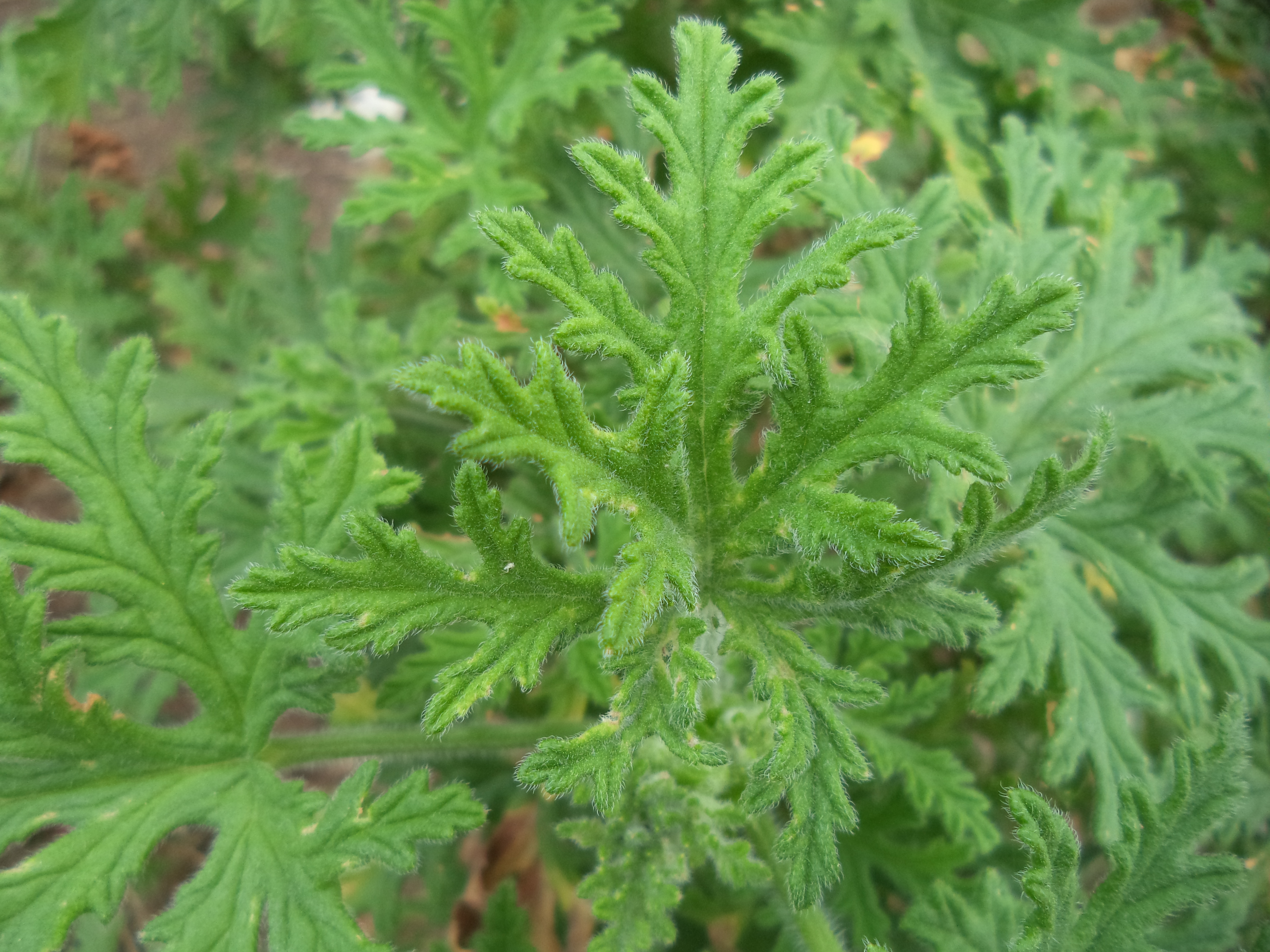
Laciniate, deeply incised, leaves of Pelargonium crispum

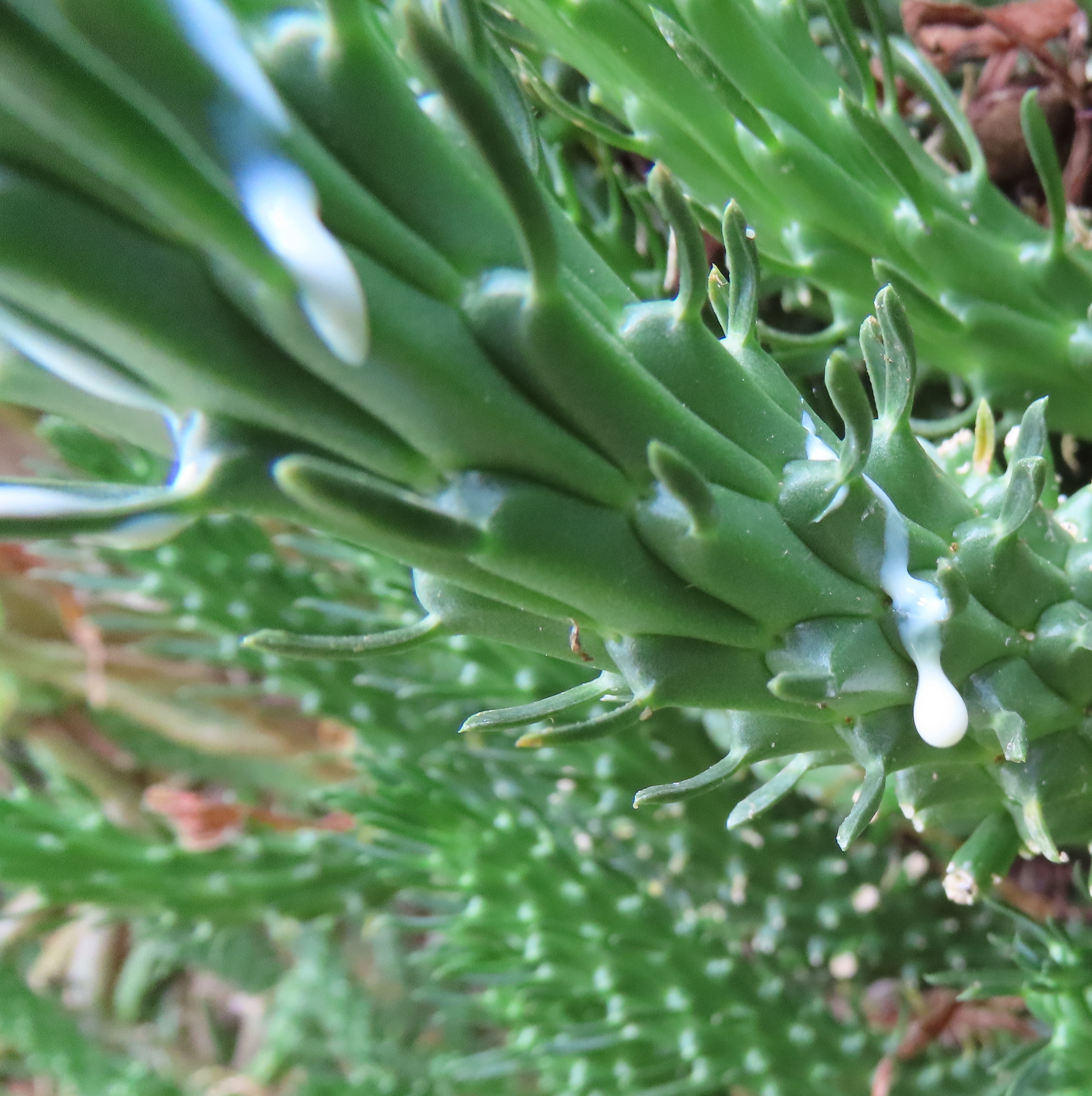
Most Euphorbias are laticiferous and instantly exude latex when even mildly punctured.

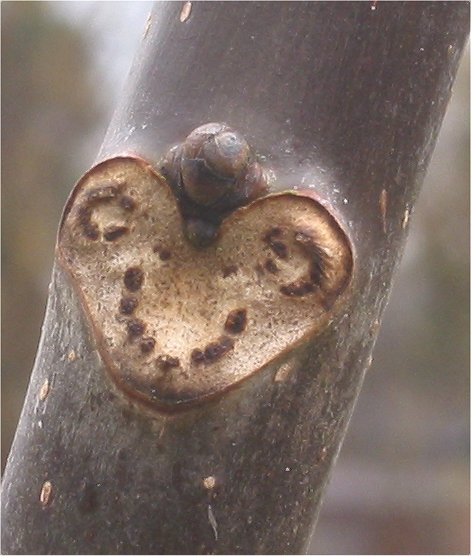
A leaf scar on Juglans regia, showing the layer of corky protective tissue that remained after the leaf separated along the abscission zone. It also shows the leaf traces of the vascular bundles that broke off when the abscission zone failed. The axillary bud associated with the leaf shows just above the scar.

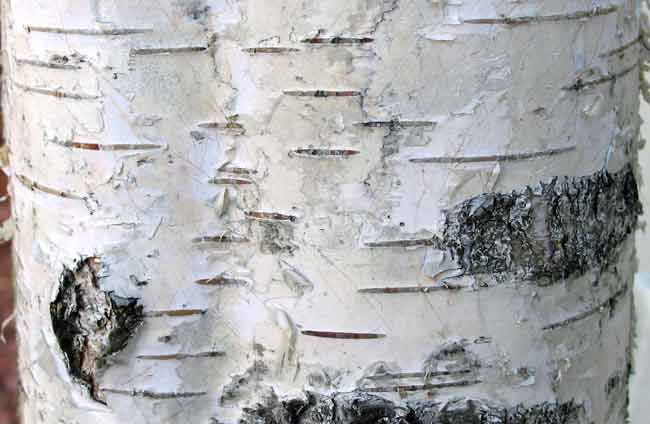
The dark horizontal lines on silver birch bark are lenticels.

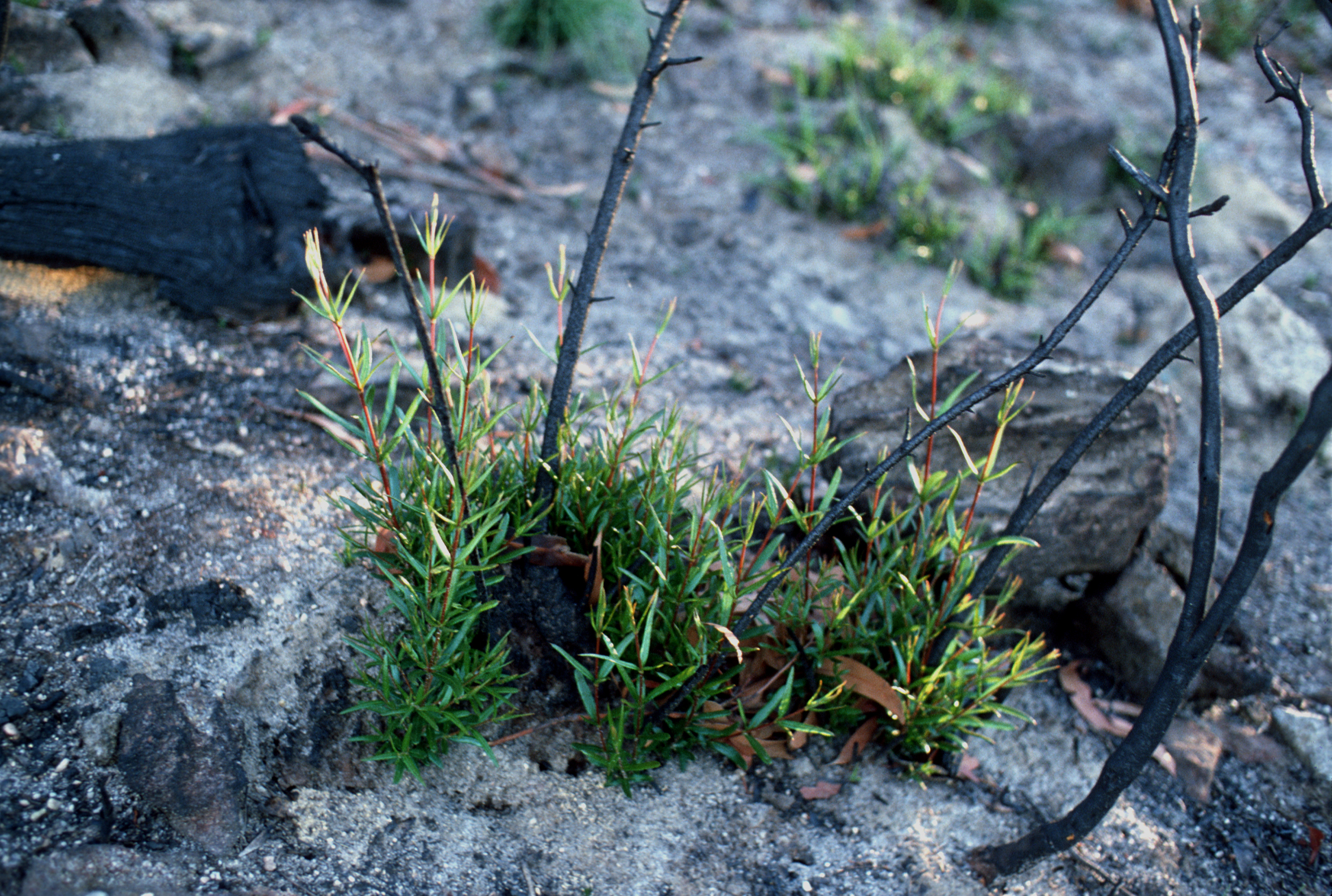
Lignotubers of Lambertia formosa growing sprouts after a bush fire

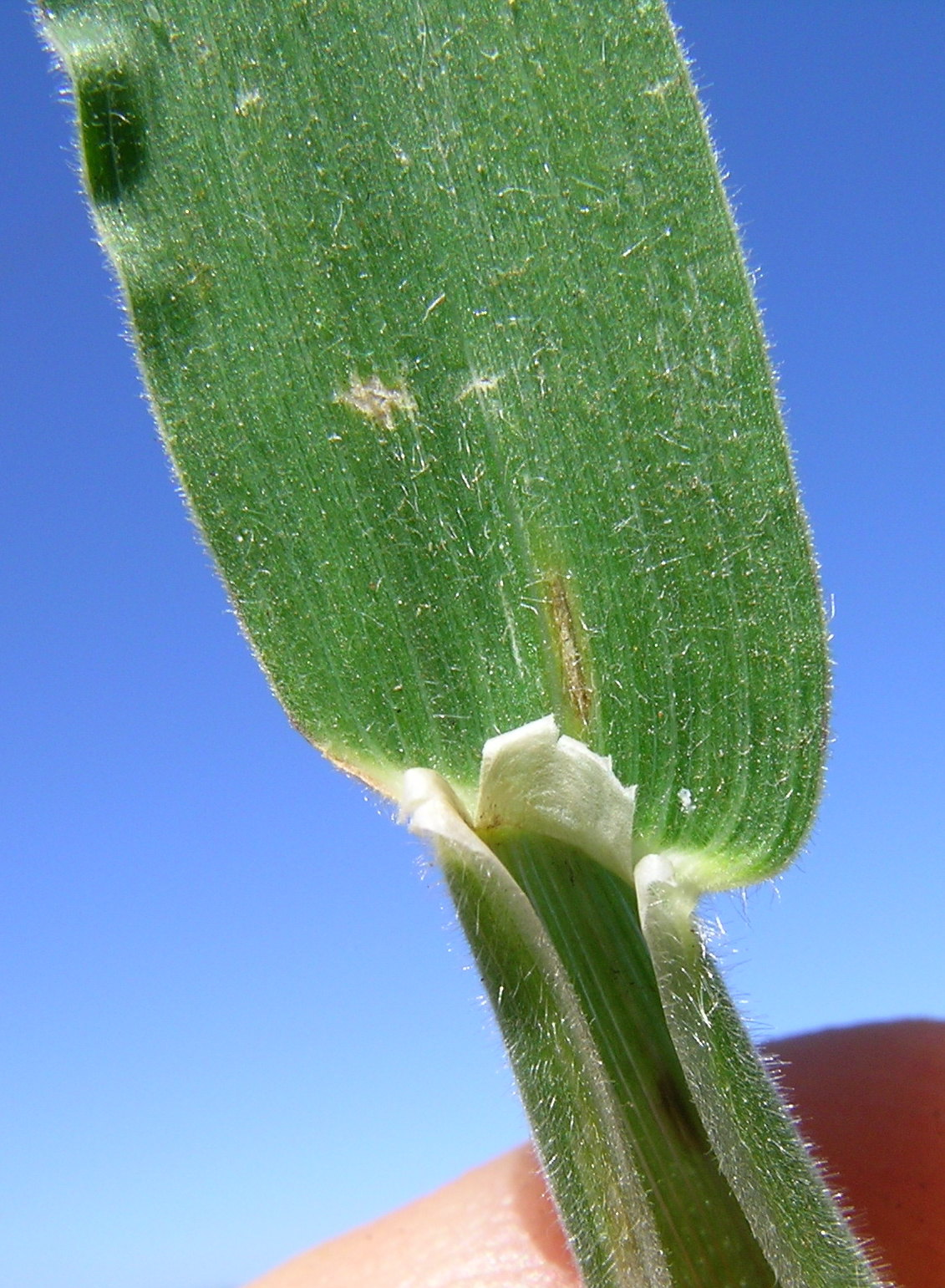
Ligule between the leaf sheath and leaf of a grass

labellum
lip; one of three or five petals which is (usually) different from the others, e.g. in Orchidaceae, Zingiberaceae, Cannaceae and Stylidiaceae.
labiate
lipped; where a corolla is divided into two parts, called an upper and lower lip, the two resembling an open mouth with lips.
lacerate
jagged, as if torn.
laciniate
Of lobes – with ends irregularly divided into deeply divided, narrow, pointed segments; Of margins – deeply divided into pointed segments in an irregular manner.
lacuna
An empty space, hole, cavity, pit, depression, or discontinuity.
lamella

Thin, plate-like layer.

Composed of an assemblage of many layers.
lamina
the blade of a leaf or the expanded upper part of a petal, sepal or bract.
lanate
covered in or composed of wooly hairs.
lanceolate
longer than broad, narrowly ovate, broadest in the lower half and tapering to the tip, like a lance or spear head; (sometimes, and incorrectly, used to mean narrowly elliptic).
lanuginose
covered in long hairs that cross and/or interweave with each other. More commonly the term lanate is used.
lateral
attached to the side of an organ, e.g. leaves or branches on a stem. For more detail see dorsal.
latex
a milky fluid that exudes from such plants such as spurges, figs and dandelions.
laticiferous
latex-bearing, producing a milky juice.
latrorse
a type of anther dehiscence in which the anthers open laterally toward adjacent anthers. Compare introrse and extrorse.
lauroid
resembling Laurus, the laurel genus, particularly its leaves.
lax
loose, not compact.
leaf
an outgrowth of a stem, usually flat and green; its main function is food manufacture by photosynthesis. Abbreviation: lvs.
leaf gap
a parenchymatous area in the stele above (distal to) a leaf trace.
leaf scar
A healing layer forming on a stem where a leaf has fallen off.
leaf sheath
The basal portion of the petiole that wraps around the plant stem.
leaf trace
A vascular bundle connecting the stele to a leaf.
leaflets
The ultimate segments of a compound leaf.
legume
1. a fruit characteristic of the family Fabaceae, formed from one carpel and either dehiscent along both sides, or indehiscent.
2. a crop species in the family Fabaceae.
3. a plant of the family Fabaceae.
lemma
the lower of 2 bracts enclosing a grass flower.
lenticel
Typically lenticular (lens-shaped) porous tissue in bark with large intercellular spaces that allows direct exchange of gases between the internal tissues and atmosphere through the bark.
lenticellate
Having lenticels
lenticular
1. lens-shaped.
2. covered in lenticels.
lepidote
covered with small scales.
leprose
powdery
liana
a woody climbing plant, rooted in the ground (liane is also used).
liane
a woody climbing plant, rooted in the ground. See also liana.
ligneous
having hard lignified tissues or woody parts, woody
lignum
Dead wood, typically in the context of a substrate for lichens.
lignicolous
Growing on wood tissue after bark as fallen or been stripped off (compare to corticolous).
lignotuber
a woody swelling of the stem below or just above the ground; contains adventitious buds from which new shoots can develop, e.g. after fire.
ligulate
1. bearing a ligule.
2. strap-shaped.
ligule
1. A small membranous appendage on the top of the sheath of grass leaves.
2. A minute adaxial appendage near the base of a leaf, e.g. in Selaginella.
3. An extended, strap-like corolla in some daisy florets.
linea, line, British line, Paris line
Various pre-metric units somewhat larger than 2 mm, used in botany into the 20th century. See Line (unit) and Paris line.
linear
Very narrow in relation to its length, with the sides mostly parallel. See Leaf shape.
lingulate
tongue-shaped.
lip
A labellum.
lithophytic
A plant growing on rocks; an epilithic plant.
lobe
Part of a leaf (or other organ), often rounded and formed by incisions to about halfway to the midrib.
lobulate
Having, consisting of or relating to a lobe or lobes.
loculicidal
(of a fruit) Dehiscing through the centers of loculi. Compare septicidal.
locule
A chamber or cavity containing seeds within an ovary, pollen within an anther or spores in a sporangium.
lodicule
One of two or three minute organs at the base of the ovary of a grass flower, representing parts of a strongly reduced perianth.
lomentum or loment
A pod-like indehiscent fruit that develops constrictions between the segments and at maturity breaks into one-seeded segments instead of splitting open.
longicidal
(of anthers) Opening lengthwise by longitudinal slits. Compare poricidal.
lunate
Crescent-shaped.
lumen
The cavity bounded by a plant cell wall.
lyrate
Lyre-shaped; deeply lobed, with a large terminal lobe and smaller lateral ones.
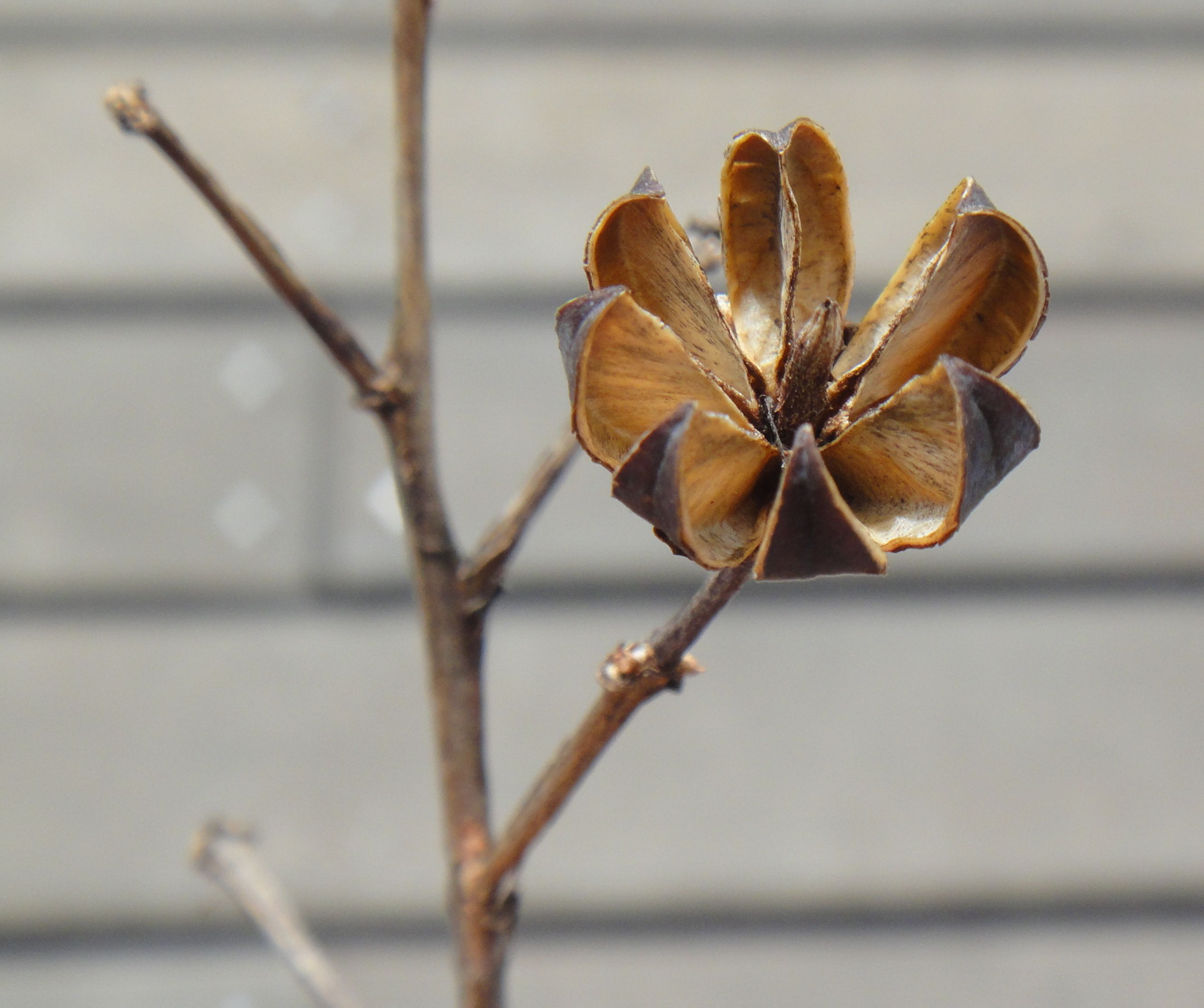
Loculicidal dehiscence of a fruit capsule. The locule walls split at the back, and the valves separate, bearing the septa on their centers.

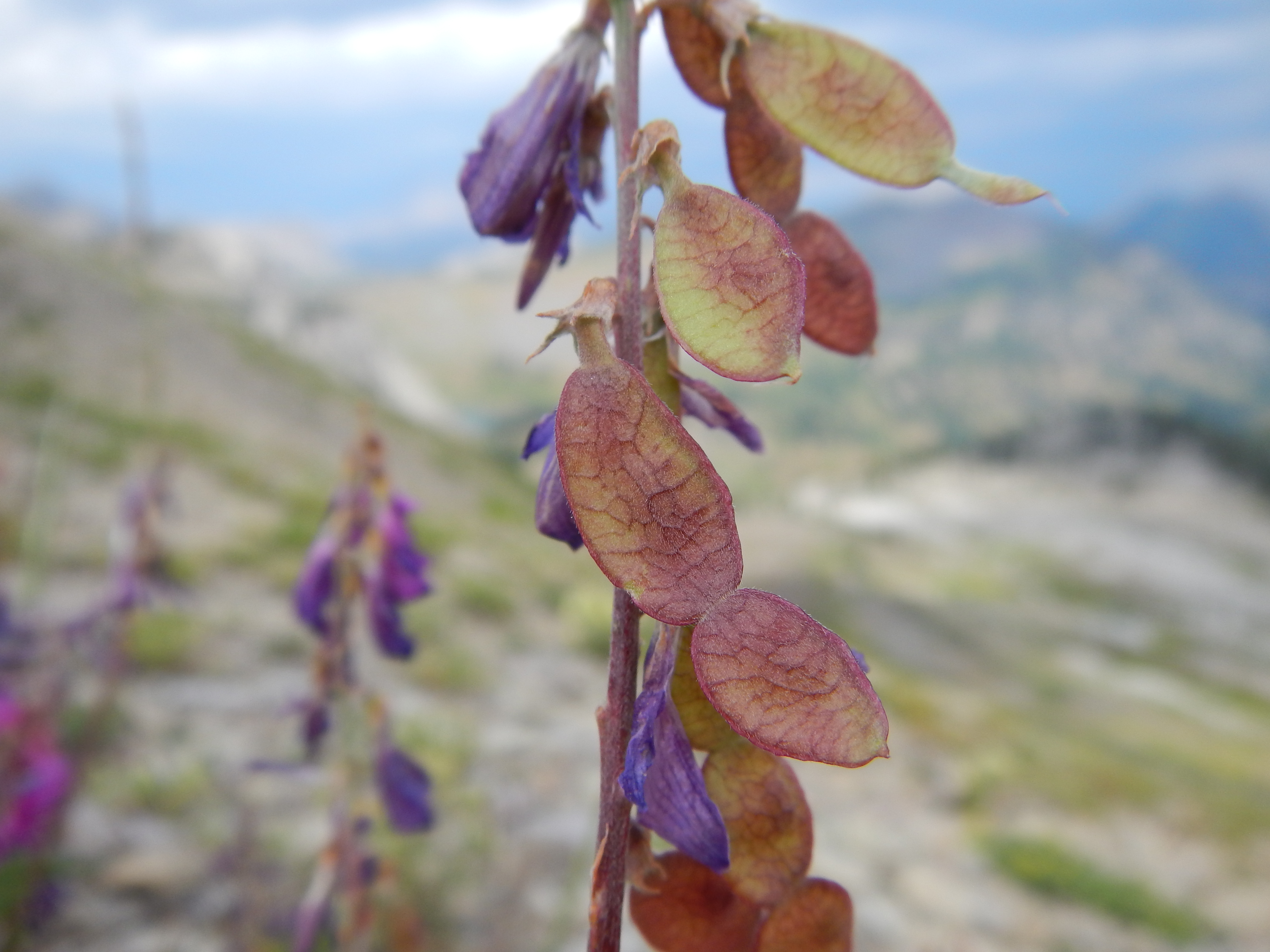
The loment (or lomentum) of Hedysarum occidentale splits into single-seeded segments along the visible lines of weakness when ripe.

== M ==
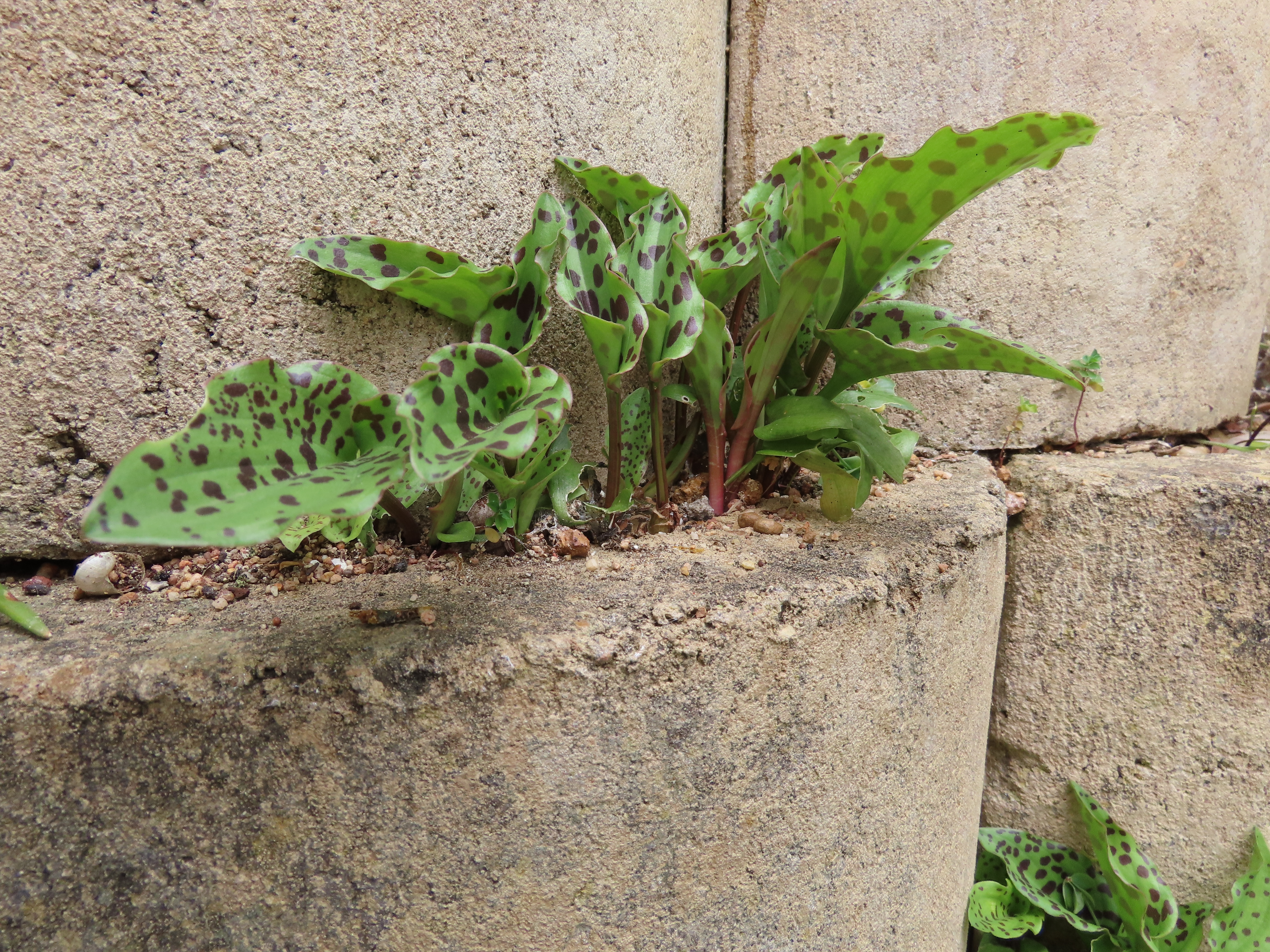
Maculate leaves

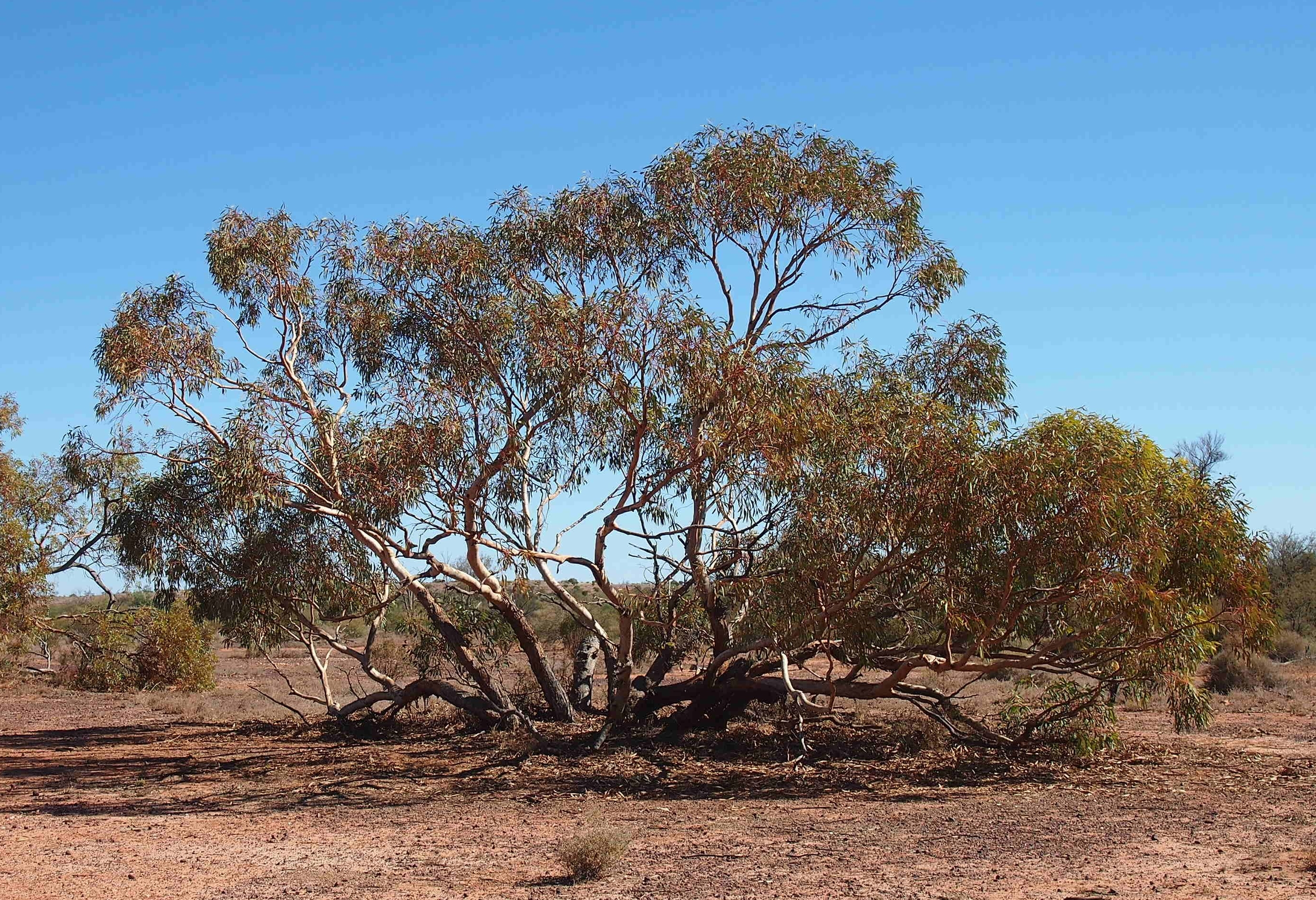
Eucalyptus socialis, showing its mallee habit, a single tree with several trunks growing from an underground lignotuber

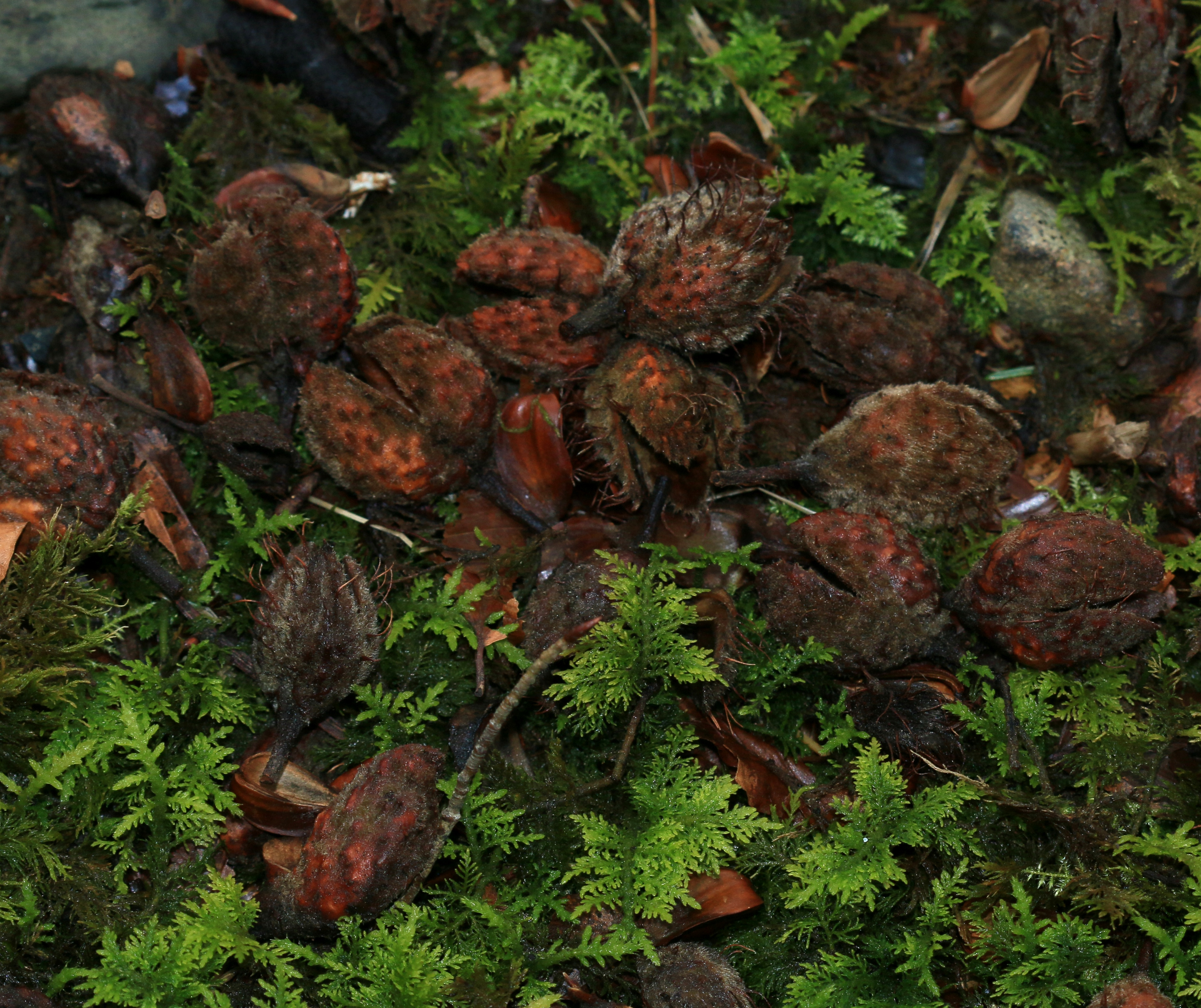
Mast from beeches on the forest floor

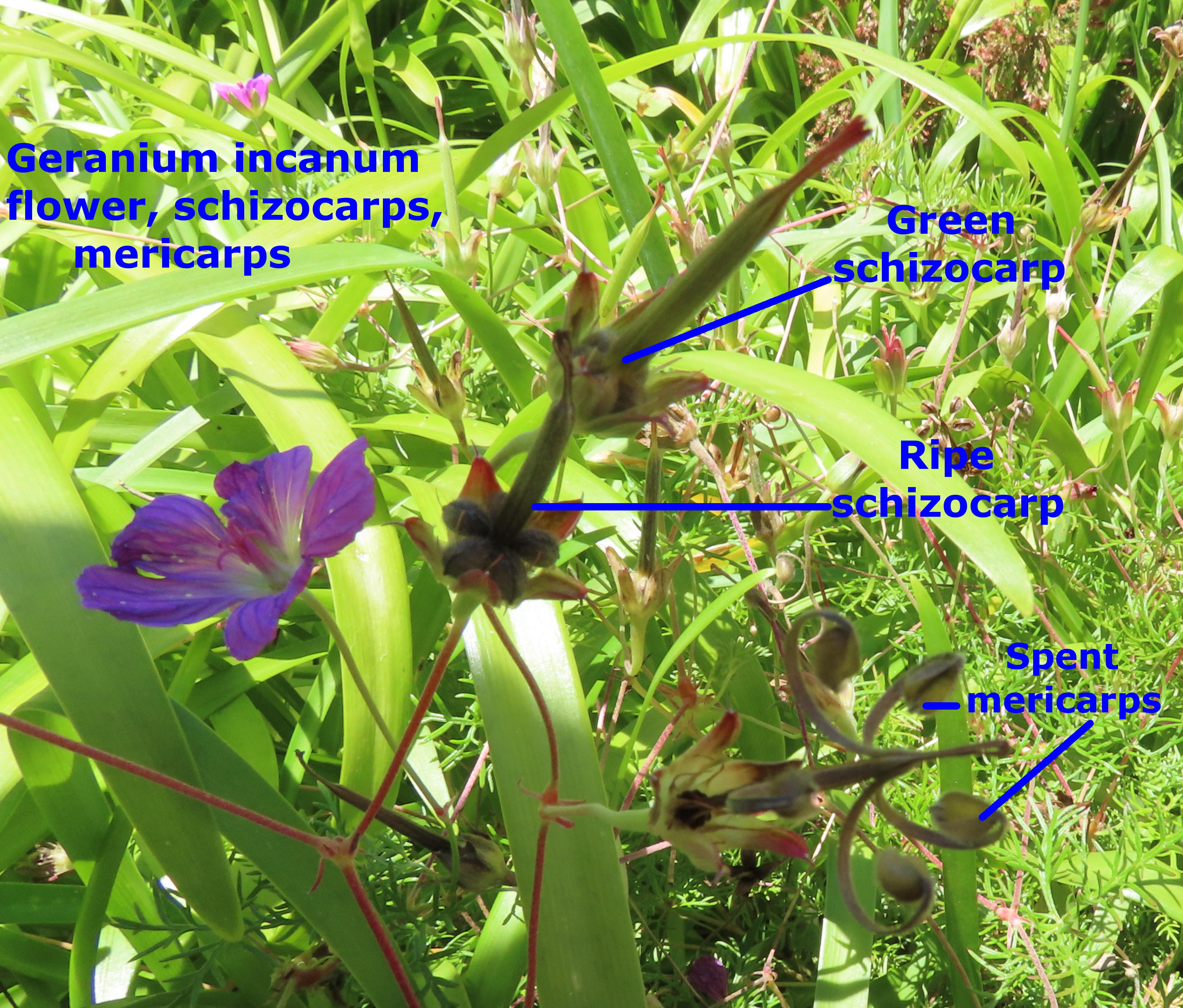
Geranium incanum schizocarp and mericarp

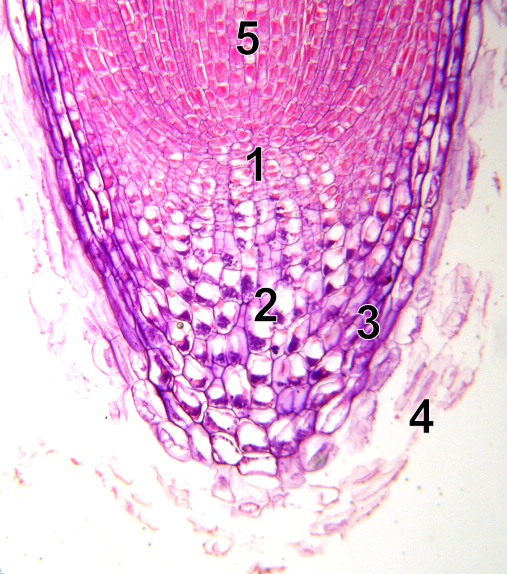
Apical meristem in root tip: 1: Meristem 2: Columella showing statocytes with statoliths 3: Lateral part of the tip 4: Dead cells 5: Elongation zone

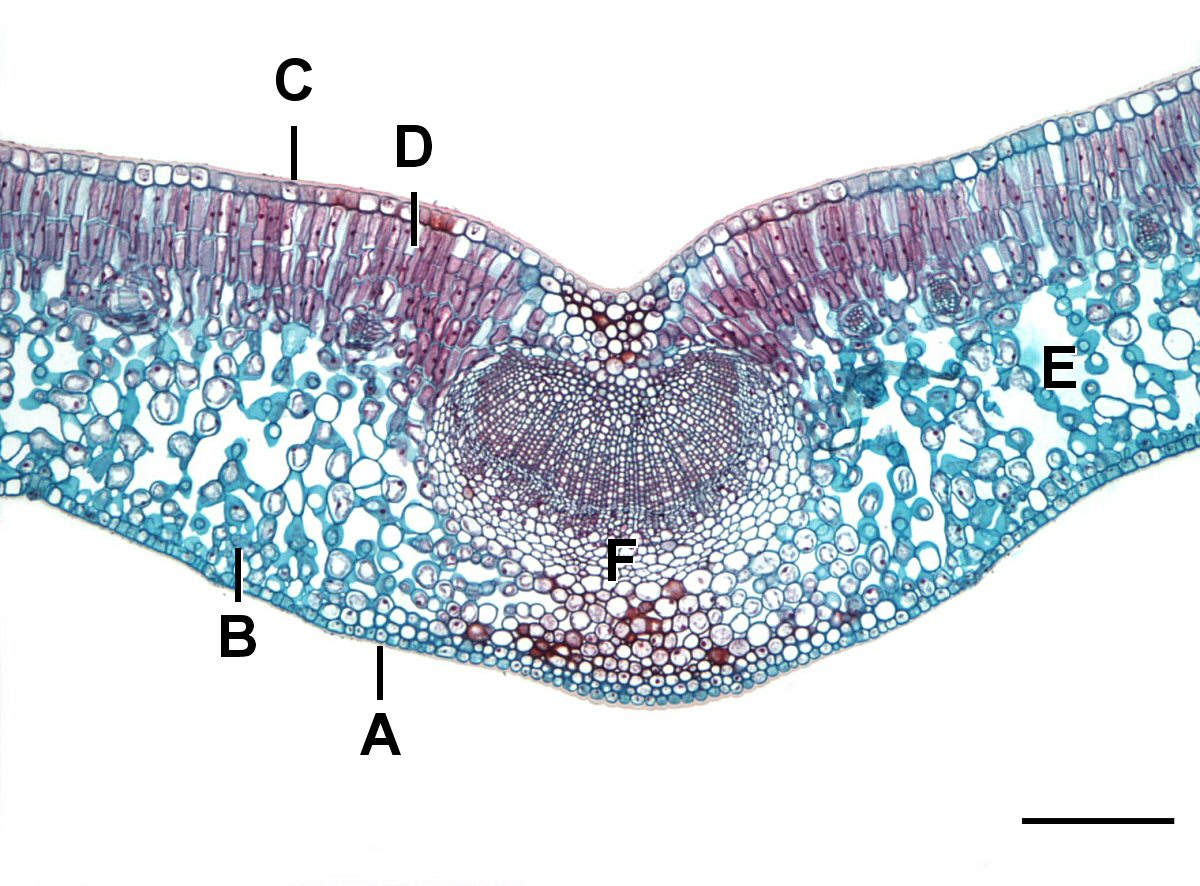
Mesophyll as seen in the cross section of a dicotyledonous leaf A-Lower epidermis B-Lower palisade mesophyll C-Upper epidermis D-Upper palisade mesophyll E- Spongy mesophyll F-Leaf vein

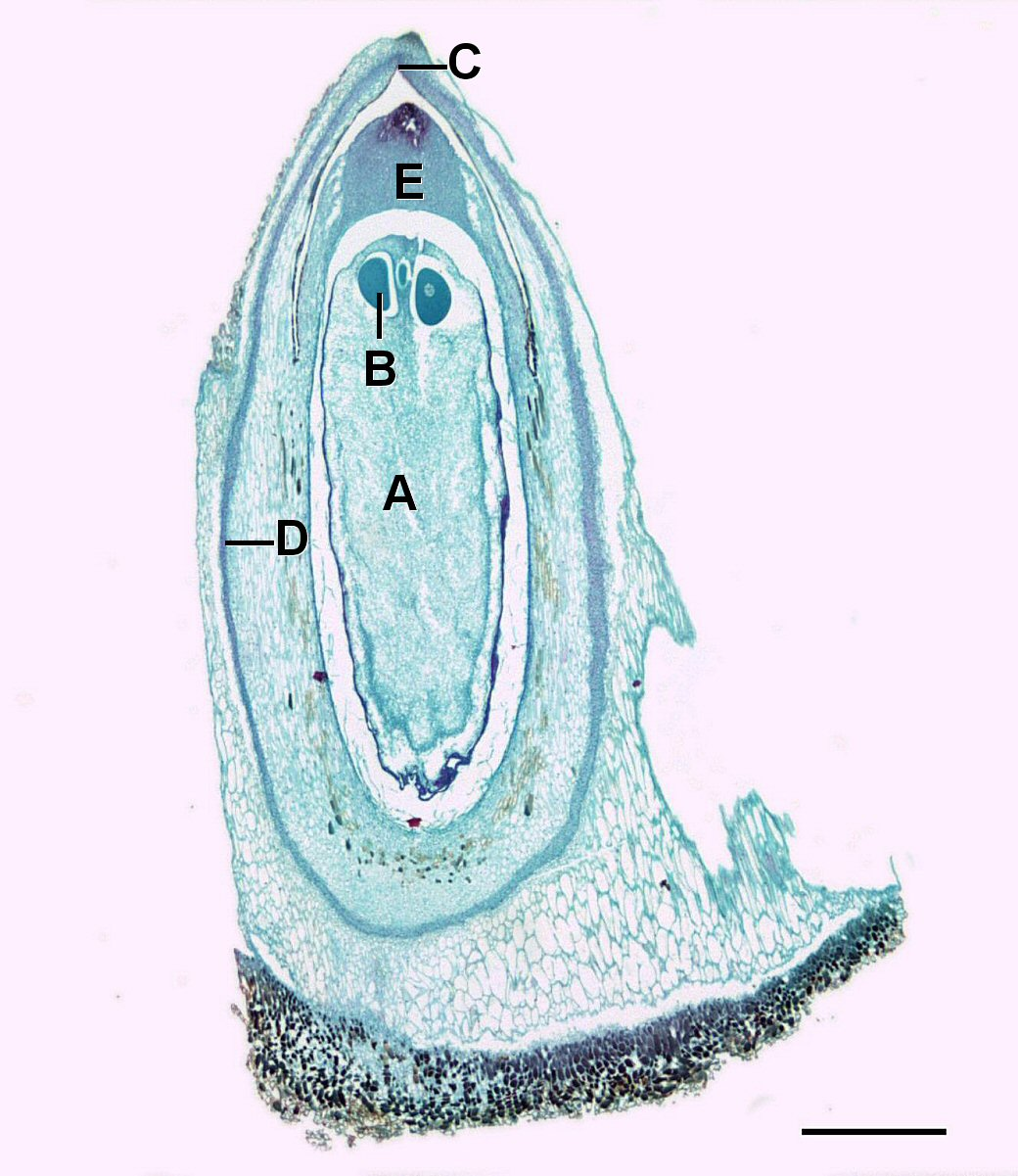
Longitudinal section of Pinus ovule A=Gametophyte B=Egg cell C=Micropyle D=Integument E=Megasporangium

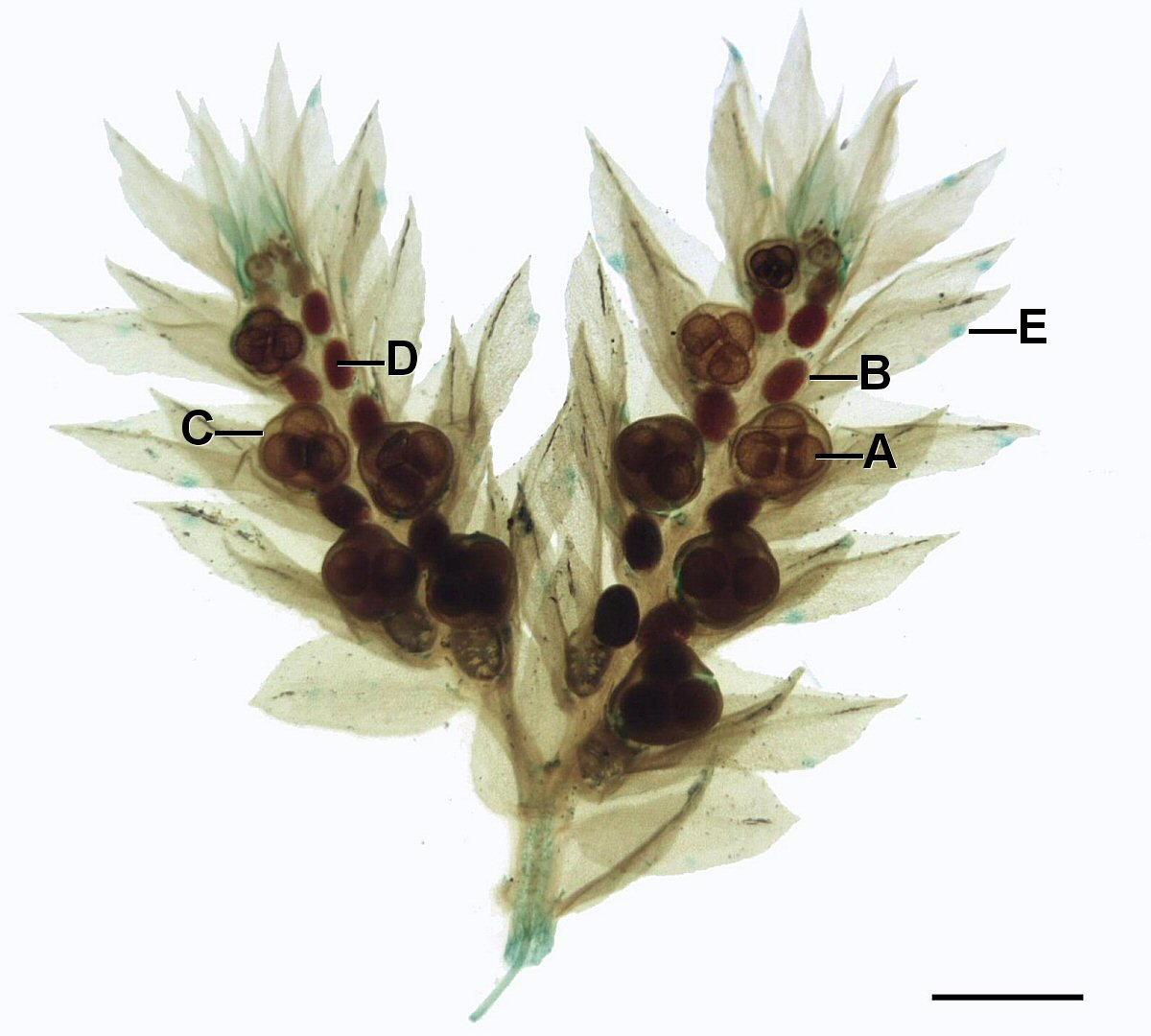
Strobilus of a Selaginella A-Megaspore B-Microsporangium C-Megasporangium D-Microspore E-Sporophyll

maculate
Spotted; marked with spots.
male flower
See staminate flower.
mallee
A growth habit in which several woody stems arise separately from a lignotuber; a plant with such a growth habit, e.g. many Eucalyptus species; vegetation characterized by such plants.
mangrove
Any shrub or small tree growing in salt or brackish water, usually characterized by pneumatophores; any tropical coastal vegetation characterized by such species.
margin
The edge of a structure, as in the edge of a leaf blade.
marginal
Occurring at or very close to a margin.
marsh
A waterlogged area or swamp.
mast
Edible fruit and nuts produced by woody species of plants (e.g. acorns and beechmast) which is consumed on the ground by wildlife species and some domestic animals.
mealy
Covered with coarse, floury powder.
medulla
pith. See also medullary rays in wood.
megasporangium
the larger of two kinds of sporangium produced by heterosporous plants, producing large spores that contain the female gametophytes. Compare microsporangium.
megaspore
the larger of two kinds of spores produced by a heterosporous plant, giving rise to the female gametophyte. Compare microspore.
megasporophyll
in hetersoporous plants, a modified leaf bearing one or more megasporangia. Compare microsporophyll.
megastrobilus
the larger of two kinds of cones or strobili produced by gymnosperms, being female and producing the seeds. Compare microstrobilus.
membranous
thin, translucent and flexible, seldom green.
mericarp
one segment of a fruit (a schizocarp) that splits at maturity into units derived from the individual carpels, or a carpel, usually 1-seeded, released by the break-up at maturity of a fruit formed from 2 or more joined carpels.
meristem
Any actively dividing plant tissue.
mesic
Moist, avoiding both extremes of drought and wet; pertaining to conditions of moderate moisture or water supply; applied to organisms (vegetation) occupying moist habitats.
mesocarp
The fleshy portion of the wall of a succulent fruit inside the skin and outside the stony layer (if any), surrounding the seed(s); sarcocarp.
mesocaul
With moderately thick twigs. Compare pachycaul.
mesomorphic
Soft and with little fibrous tissue, but not succulent.
mesophyll
1. The parenchyma tissues between the upper and lower epidermis. They vary in function, but usually include the photosynthetic tissue of a leaf.
2. In ecology, the blade of a leaf or leaflet that has a surface area 4500–18225 mm^{2}; a plant, or vegetation, that has mesophyll (sized) leaves.
mesophyllous
(of vegetation) Of moist habitats and having mostly large and soft leaves.
mesophyte
A plant thriving under intermediate environmental conditions of moderate moisture and temperature, without major seasonal fluctuations.
micropyle
Opening at apex of ovule.
microsporangium
The smaller of two kinds of sporangium produced by a heterosporous plant, producing microspores that contain the male gametophyte. Compare megasporangium.
microspore
The smaller of two kinds of spores produced by a heterosporous plant. Compare megaspore.
microsporophyll
In heterosporous plants, a modified leaf bearing one or more microsporangia. Compare megasporophyll.
microstrobilus
The smaller of two kinds of cones or strobilus produced by gymnosperms, being male and producing the pollen. Compare megastrobilus.
midrib

The central and usually most prominent vein of a leaf or leaf-like organ.
midvein
See midrib.
monad
A single individual that is free from other individuals, not united with them into a group. The term is usually used for pollen to distinguish single grains from tetrads or polyads.
monadelphous
A term describing stamen filaments that are fused for the greater part of their length, forming a tube around the style.
moniliform
Resembling a string of beads.
monocarpic
Flowering and setting seed only once before dying. See also semelparous.
monochasium
A cymose inflorescence with the branches arising singly. Compare dichasium and pleiochasium.
monocot
An abbreviation of monocotyledon.
monocotyledon
A flowering plant whose embryo contains one cotyledon (seed-leaf). Compare dicotyledon.
monoecious
(of vascular plants) Hermaphroditic, with all flowers bisexual, or with male and female reproductive structures in separate flowers but on the same plant, or of an inflorescence that has unisexual flowers of both sexes. Contrast dioecious.
monoicous
(of bryophyte gametophytes) Hermaphroditic or bisexual, where both male and female reproductive structures develop on the same individual. Contrast dioicous.
monograph
Of a group of plants, a comprehensive treatise presenting an analysis and synthesis of taxonomic knowledge of that taxon; the fullest account possible (at the time) of a family, tribe or genus. It is generally worldwide in scope and evaluates all taxonomic treatments of that taxon including studies of its evolutionary relationships with other related taxa, and cytological, genetic, morphological, palaeobotanical and ecological studies. The term is often incorrectly applied to any systematic work devoted to a single taxon. Compare revision.
monomorphic
Of one type, rather than several. See also dimorphic (two types) and polymorphic (many types).
monophyllous
Having a single leaf.
monopodial
A mode of stem growth and branching in which the main axis is formed by a single dominant meristem. Contrast sympodial.
monostromatic
Being a single cell thick, as in the alga Monostroma.
monothecous
having a sole compartment or cell. Compare Dithecous.
monotypic
Containing only one taxon of the next lower rank, e.g. a family with only one genus, or a genus that includes only a single species.
morphology
The shape or form of an organism or part thereof.
mucro

A sharp, short point, generally at the tip of a leaf or the tip of the midrib of a compound leaf.
mucronate
Terminating in a mucro.
multiple fruit
A cluster of fruits produced from more than one flower and appearing as a single fruit, often on a swollen axis, as with many species of the family Moraceae. Compare aggregate fruit.
muricate
Covered with short, hard protuberances.
mutation
In times before the nature of genetic encoding was understood, mutation was regarded as an abrupt, and sometimes heritable, variation from the norm of a population; for example a plant might unexpectedly produce "double" flowers, a novel color, or a habit of growth uncharacteristic of the species or variety. Advances in genetics and molecular biology in the mid-twentieth century, showed that biological mutations comprise and reflect changes in the nucleic acid molecules that encode the genome of an organism or virus. The nucleic acid affected could be DNA in the chromosomes, or it could be extrachromosomal DNA (typically DNA in the mitochondria or chloroplasts). In RNA viruses a mutation would be a change to the genetic information that the RNA encodes.
mycelium
The "vegetative" (nonreproductive) part of a fungus, mostly composed of aggregations of hyphae. It functions in substrate decomposition and absorption of nutrients.
mycorrhiza

One of several types of symbiotic association between a fungus and the roots of a plant.
mycotroph

A plant that obtains most or all of its carbon, water, and nutrients by associating with a fungus.
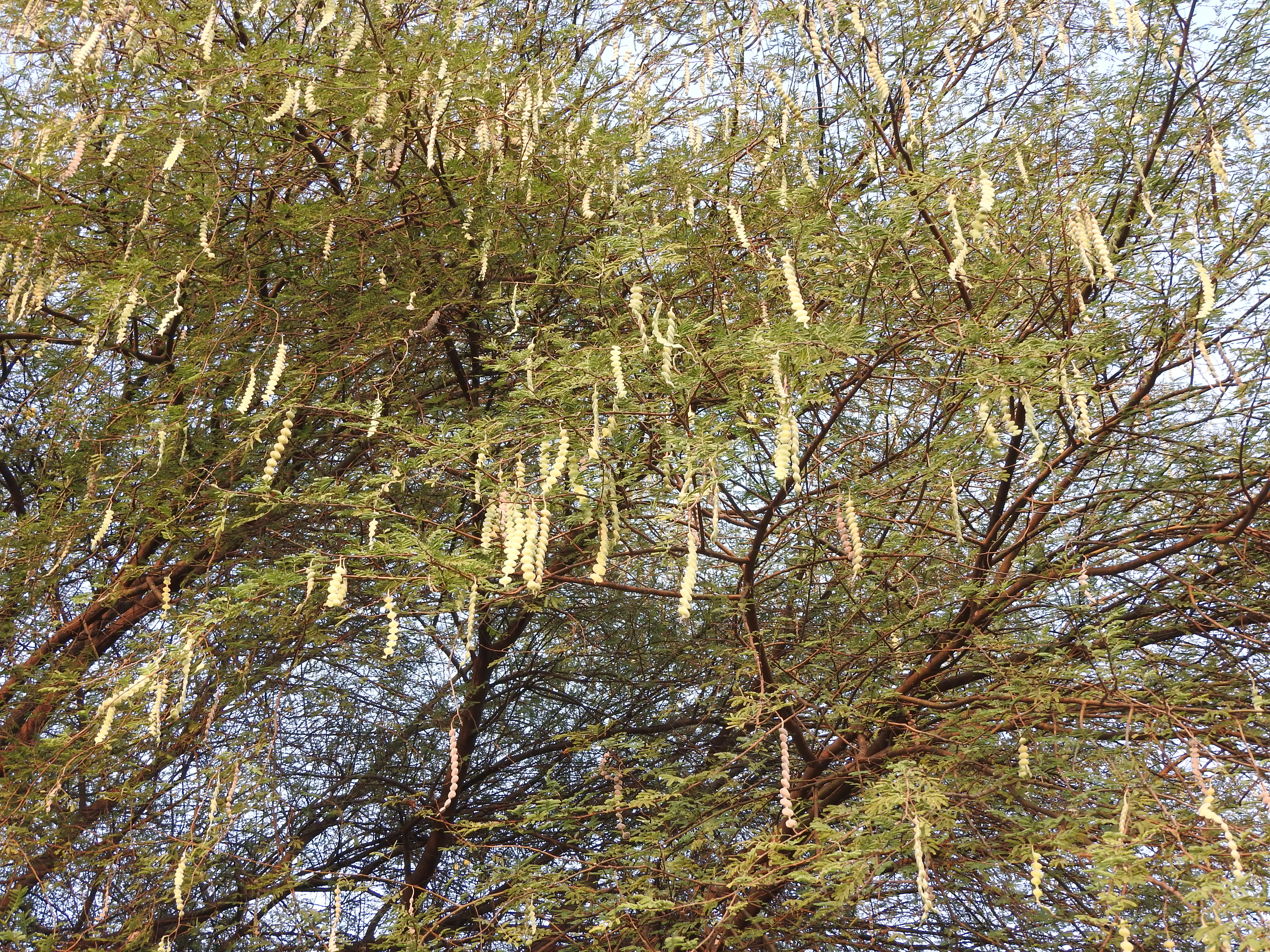
Moniliform pods on Vachellia nilotica

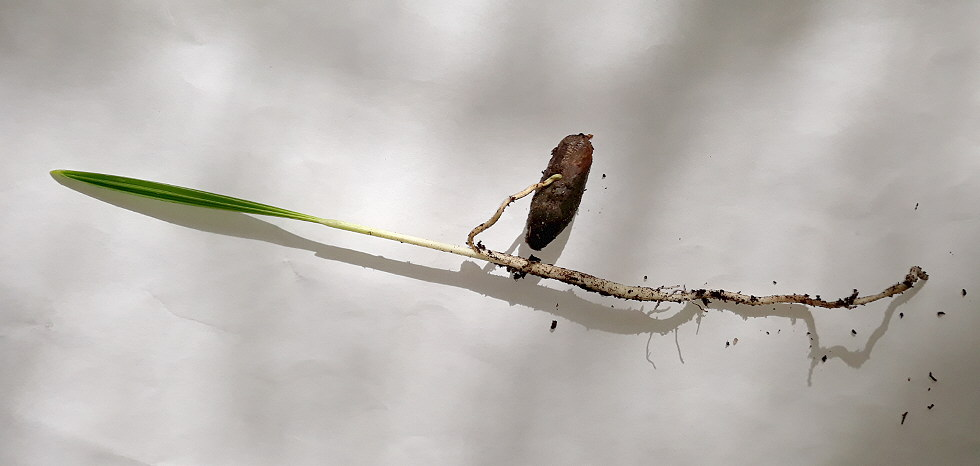
A germinating date palm, Phoenix dactylifera, a monocotyledon, showing its single cotyledon

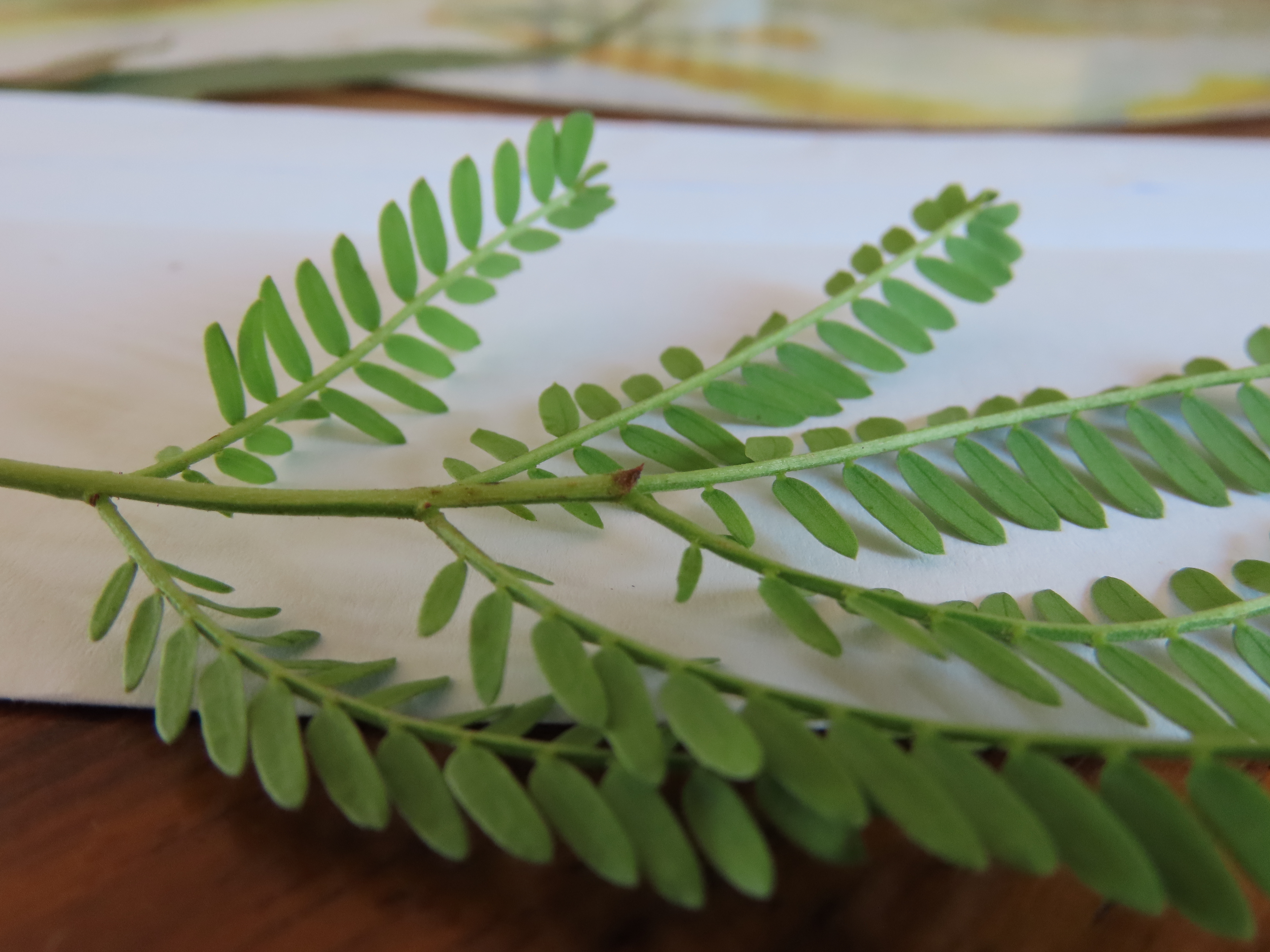
Mucro at the tip of the rachis of a compound leaf of Vachellia karroo

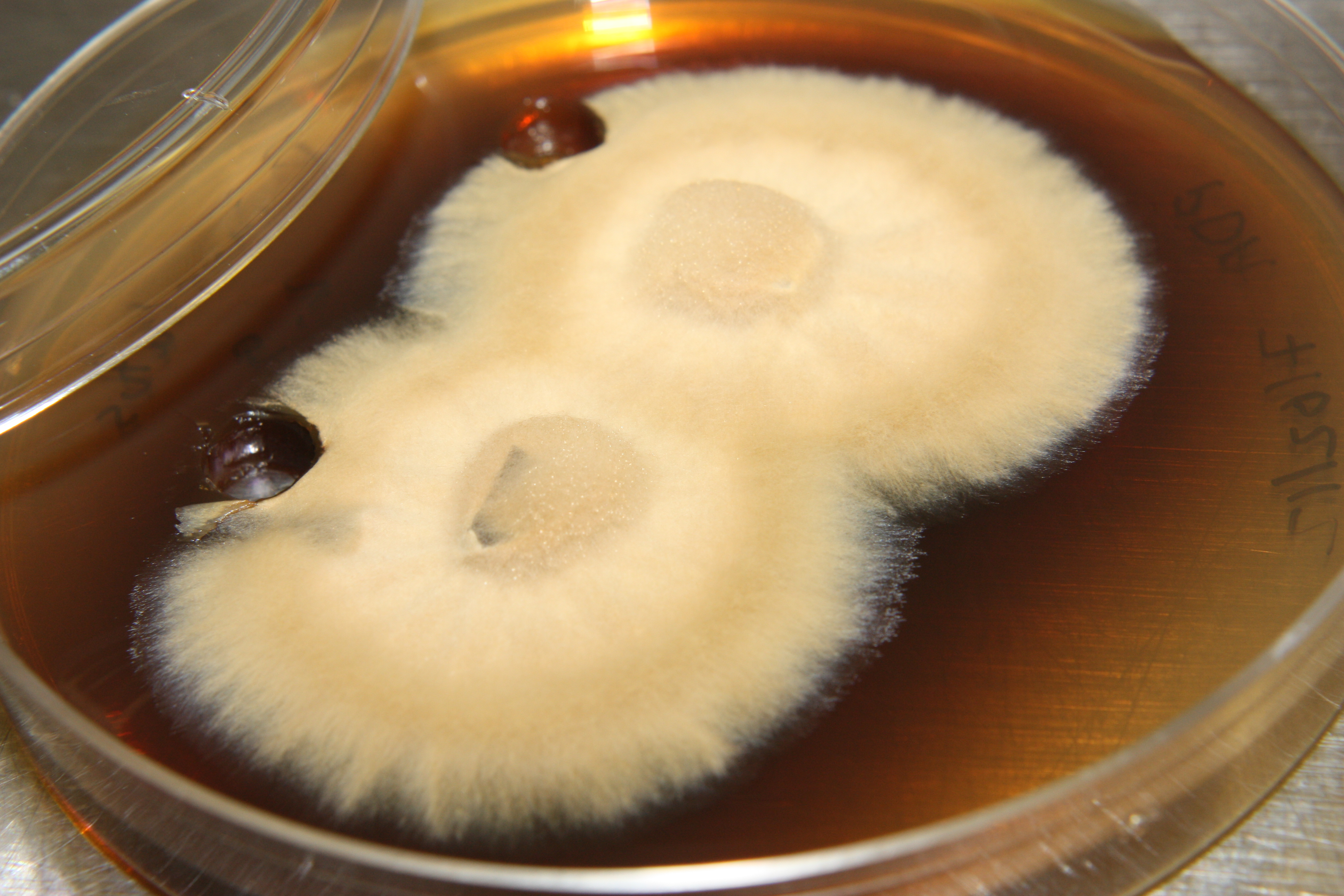
Fungal mycelium grown in culture dish

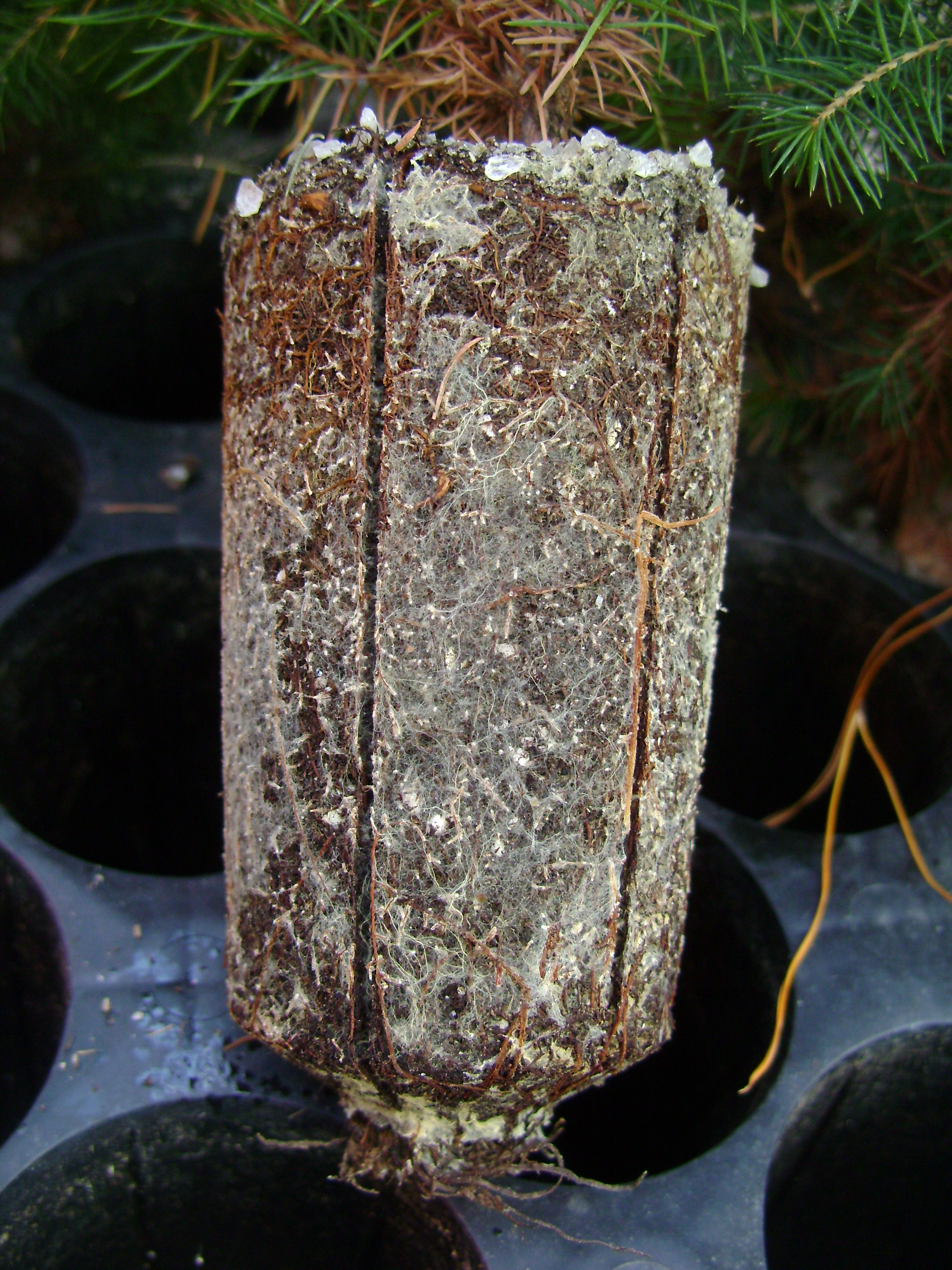
Mycelium of mycorrhiza growing on the roots of Picea

== N ==
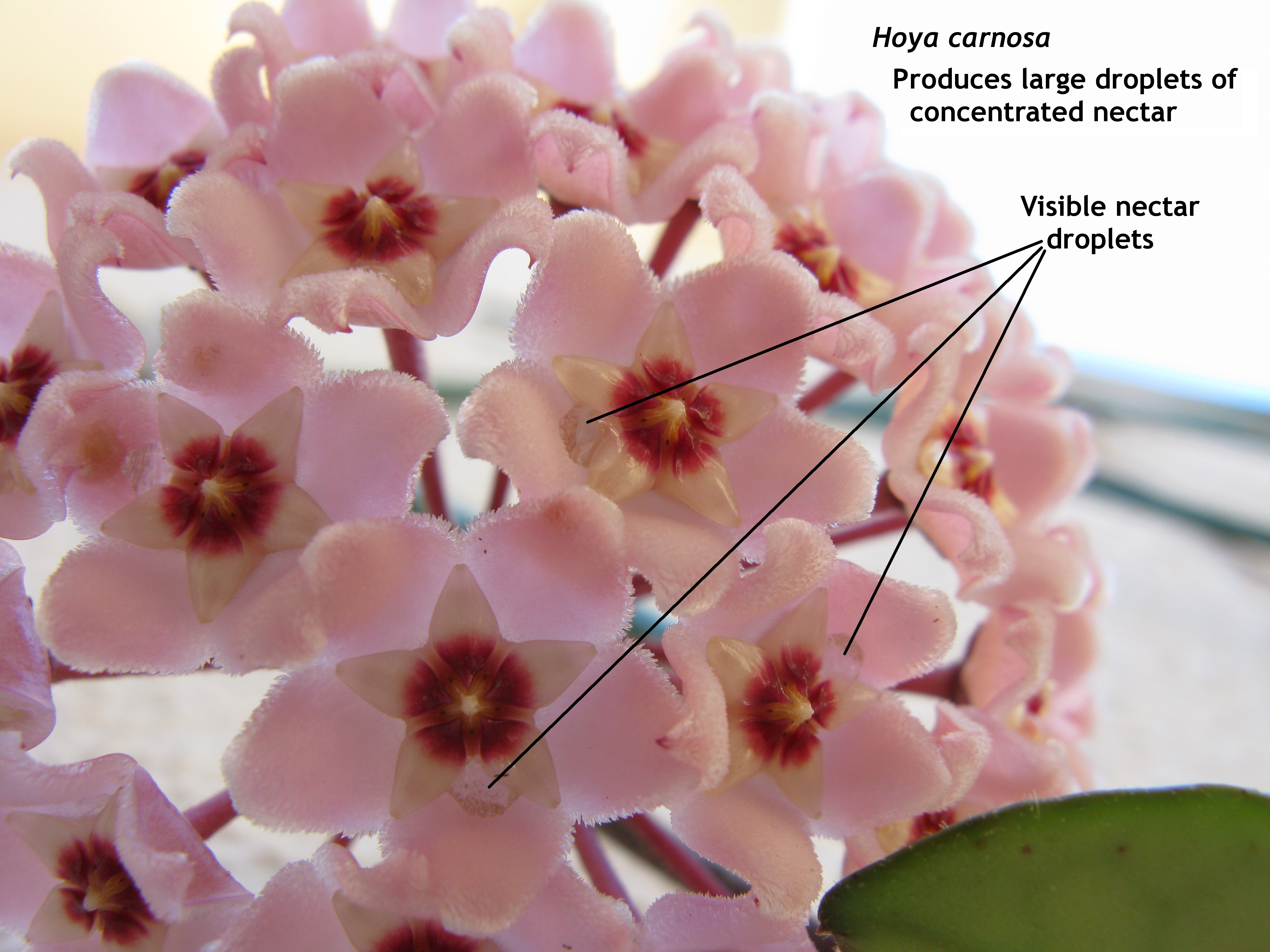
Hoya carnosa secretes so much nectar that it falls in drops if no pollinators remove it.

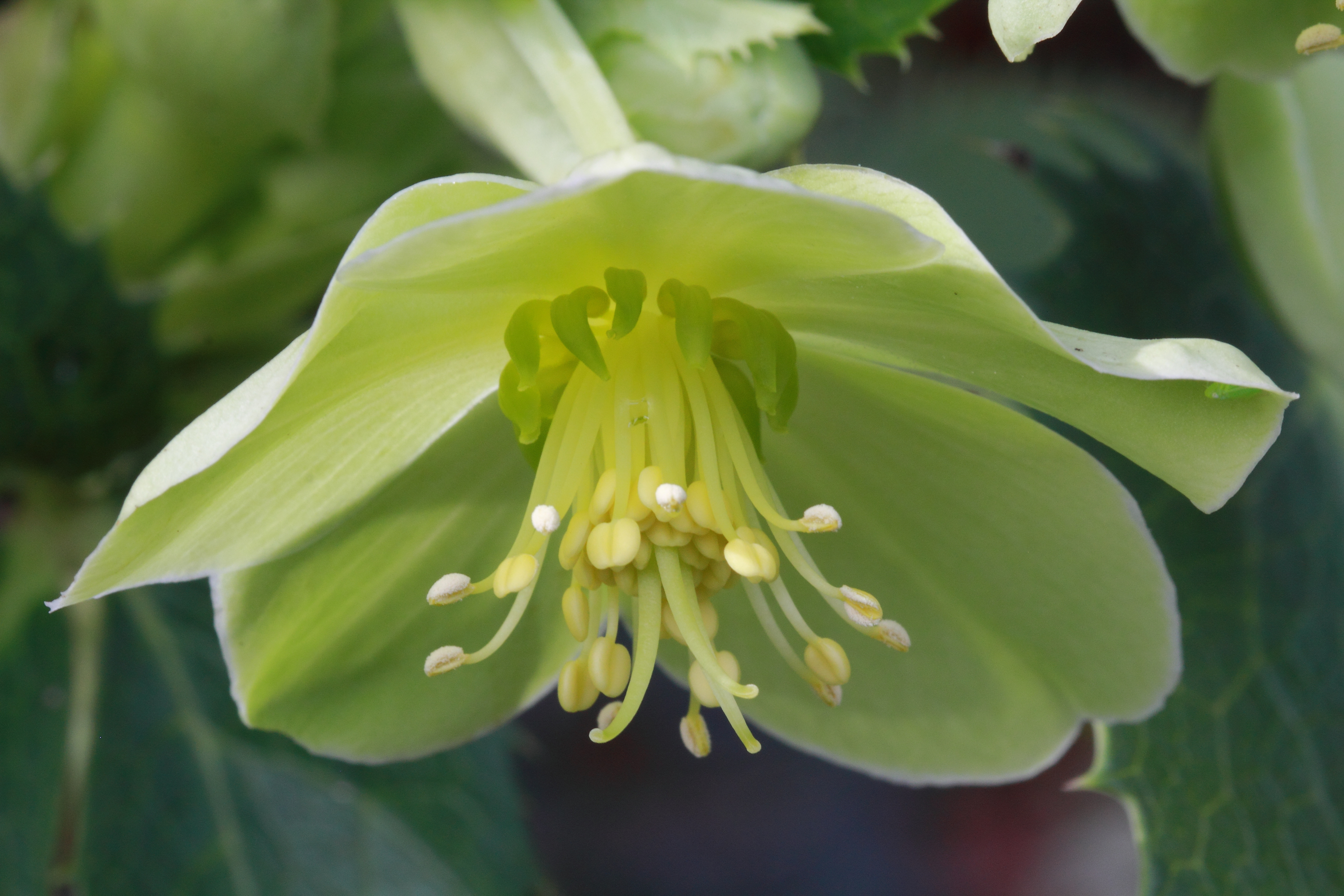
The small green petals of Helleborus argutifolius act as floral nectaries. The sepals function as petals.

native
Naturally occurring in an area, but not necessarily confined to it. Compare endemic.
natural hybrid
A hybrid taxon produced by chance in the wild.
naturalised
Describing a plant, introduced from another region, that grows and reproduces readily in competition with the natural flora.
nectar
A usually sweet, nutrient-rich fluid produced by the flowers of many plants and collected by bees and other pollinators.
nectary

A specialized gland that secretes nectar.
neophyte
A plant that has recently been introduced to a geographic area. Contrast archaeophyte.
nerve
Another name for a vein.
node
The part of a stem from which leaves or branches arise.
nomen conservandum
(Latin) A conserved name, usually a name that became so much better known than the correct name, that a substitution was made.
nomen illegitimum
A name that is either superfluous at its time of publication because the taxon to which it was applied already has a name, or the name has already been applied to another plant (a homonym).
nomen invalidum
A name that is not validly published, and technically is therefore not a botanical name. Abbreviation: nom. inval. See Validly published name.
nomen nudum
A name not published in accordance with the International Code of Nomenclature for algae, fungi, and plants, usually without a diagnosis or description of the entity to which it applies, and without reference to either; such a name should not be used.
nomenclature
The naming of things; often restricted to the correct use of scientific names in taxonomy; a system that sets out provisions for the formation and use of names.
noxious
Of plants, containing harmful or unwholesome qualities. Applied in conjunction with 'weed' to specifically describe a plant which legislation deems harmful to the environment. Each state and territory in Australia has specific legislation governing noxious weeds.
nucellus
The tissue of the ovule of a seed plant that surrounds the female gametophyte. It is enclosed by integuments and is not of epidermal origin.
numerous
Stamens are described as numerous when there are more than twice as many as sepals or petals, especially when there is no set number of them. Compare indefinite.
nut
A hard, dry, indehiscent fruit containing only one seed.
nutlet
1. A small nut.
2. One of the lobes or sections of the mature ovary of some members of the Boraginaceae, Verbenaceae, and Lamiaceae.
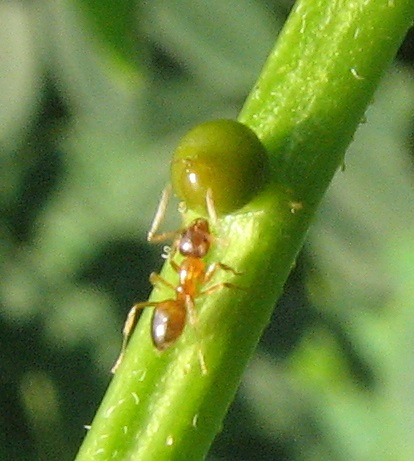
Some Senna species have extrafloral nectaries that attract ants to defend them from pests.

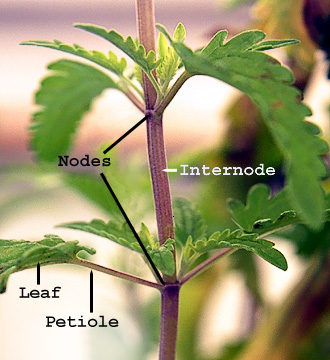
Plant stem nodes and internodes

== O ==
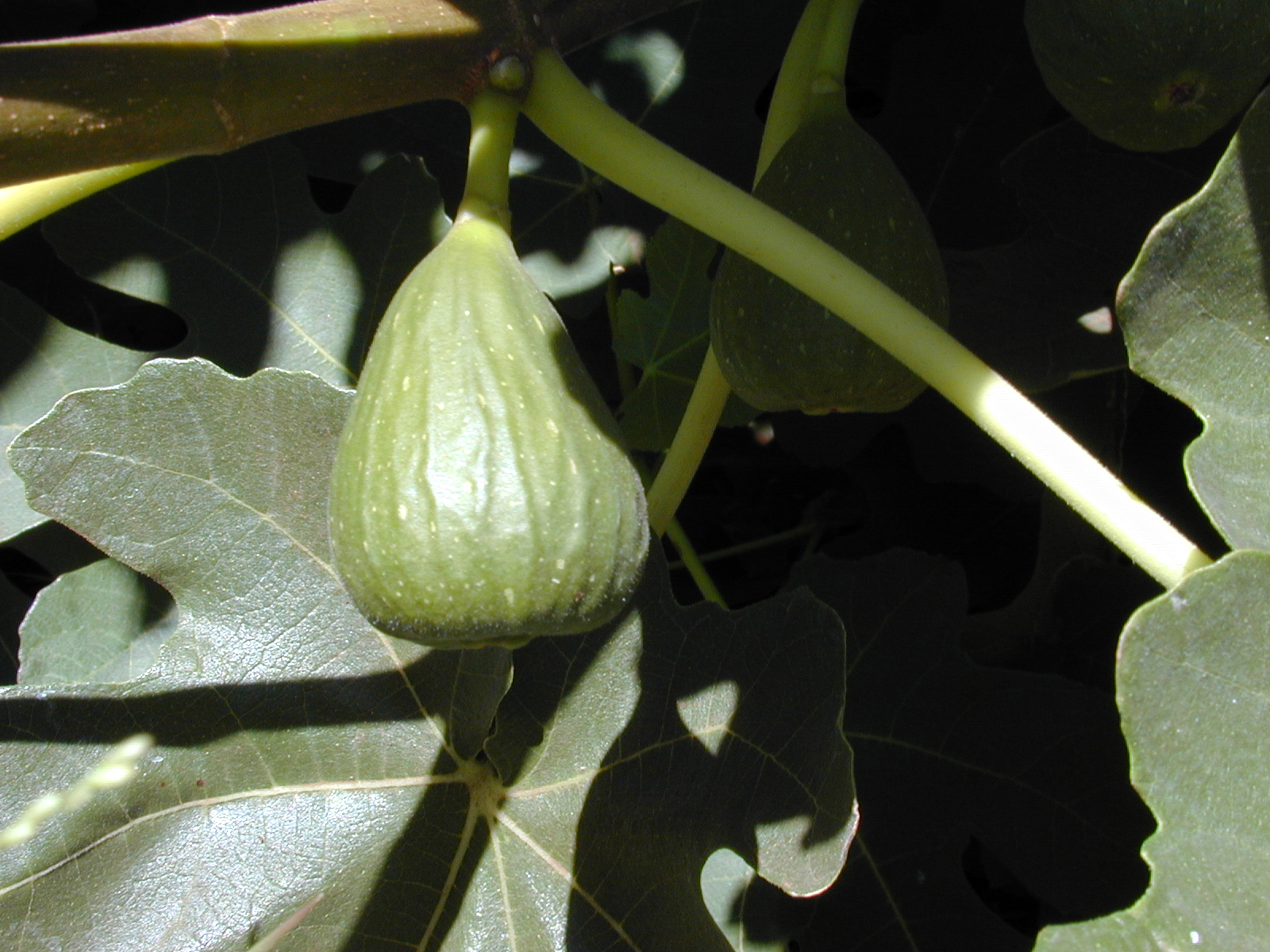
Obconical syconium (infructescence) of Ficus carica

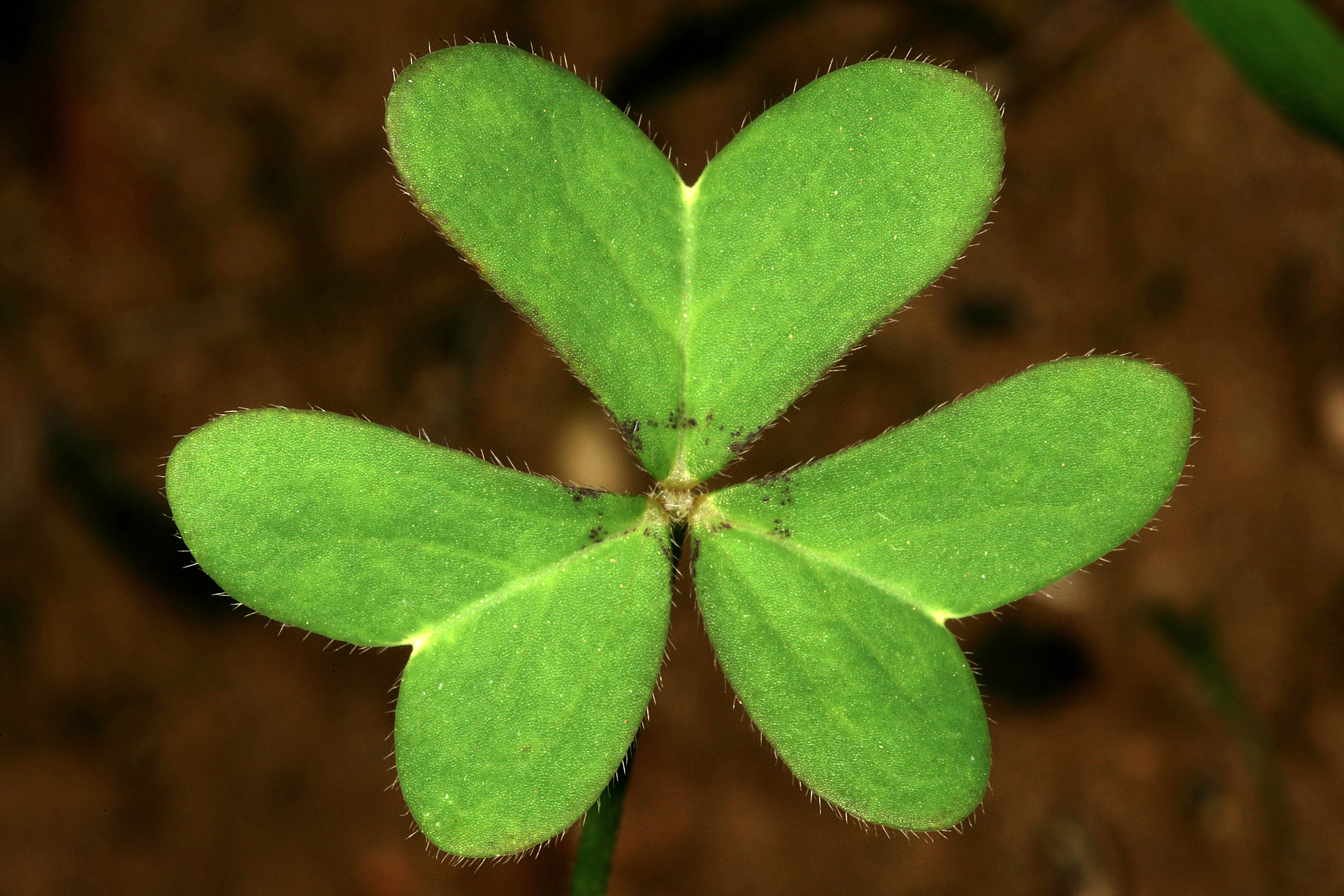
Obcordate leaflets of a ternate leaf of Oxalis pes-caprae

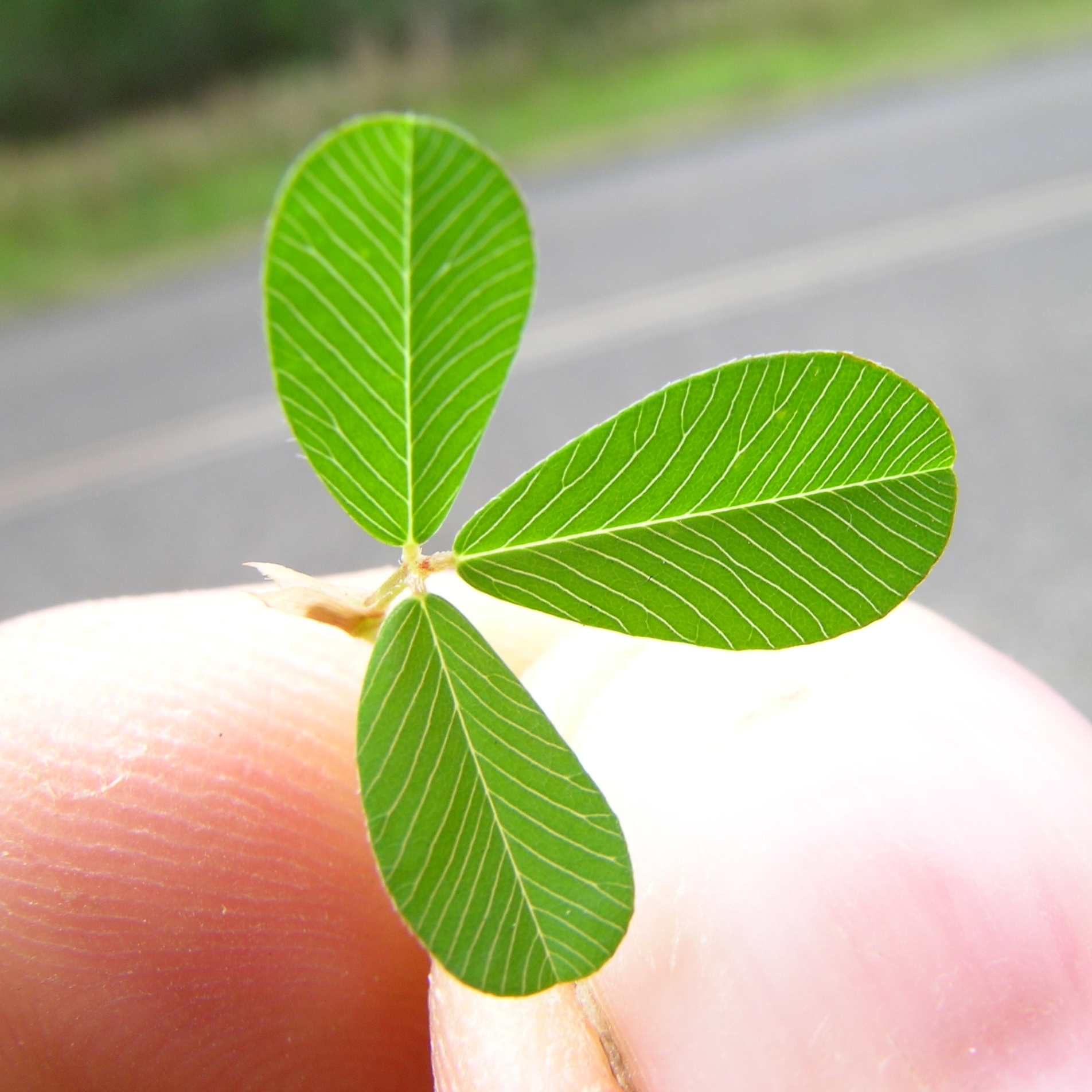
Obovate leaflets of a ternate leaf of Kummerowia

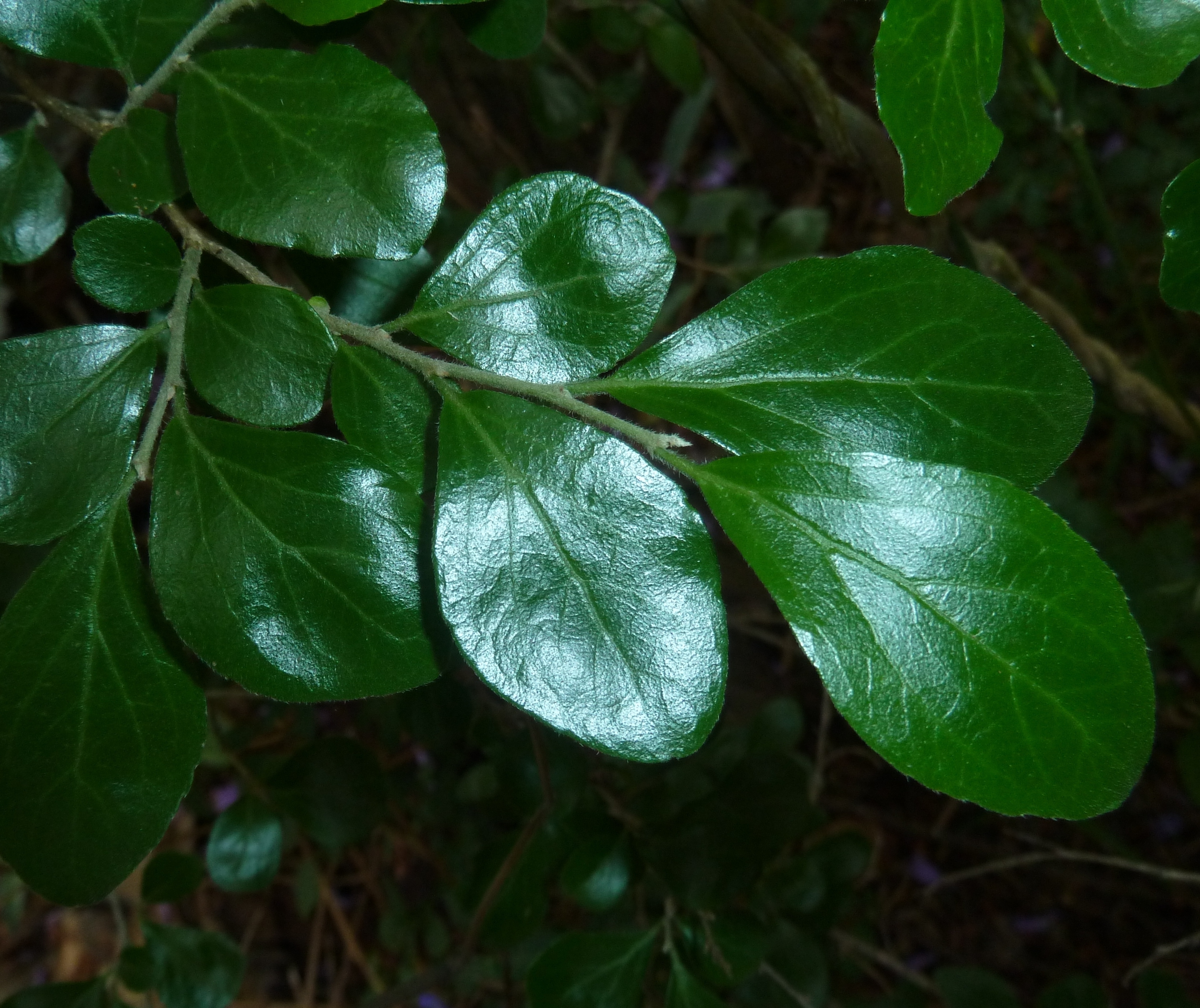
Obtuse leaves of Dovyalis zeyheri

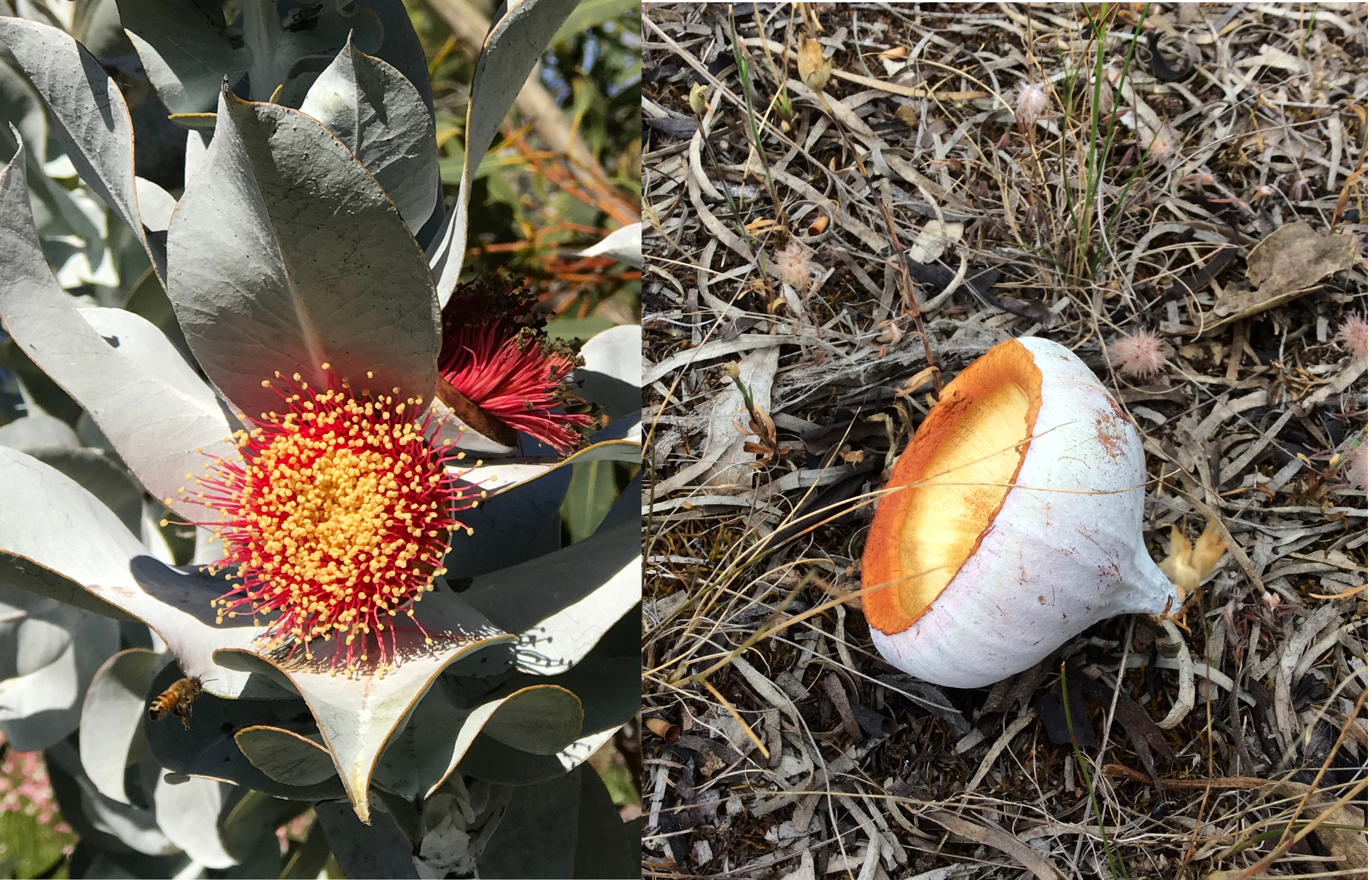
Open flower of Eucalyptus macrocarpa, next to a shed operculum

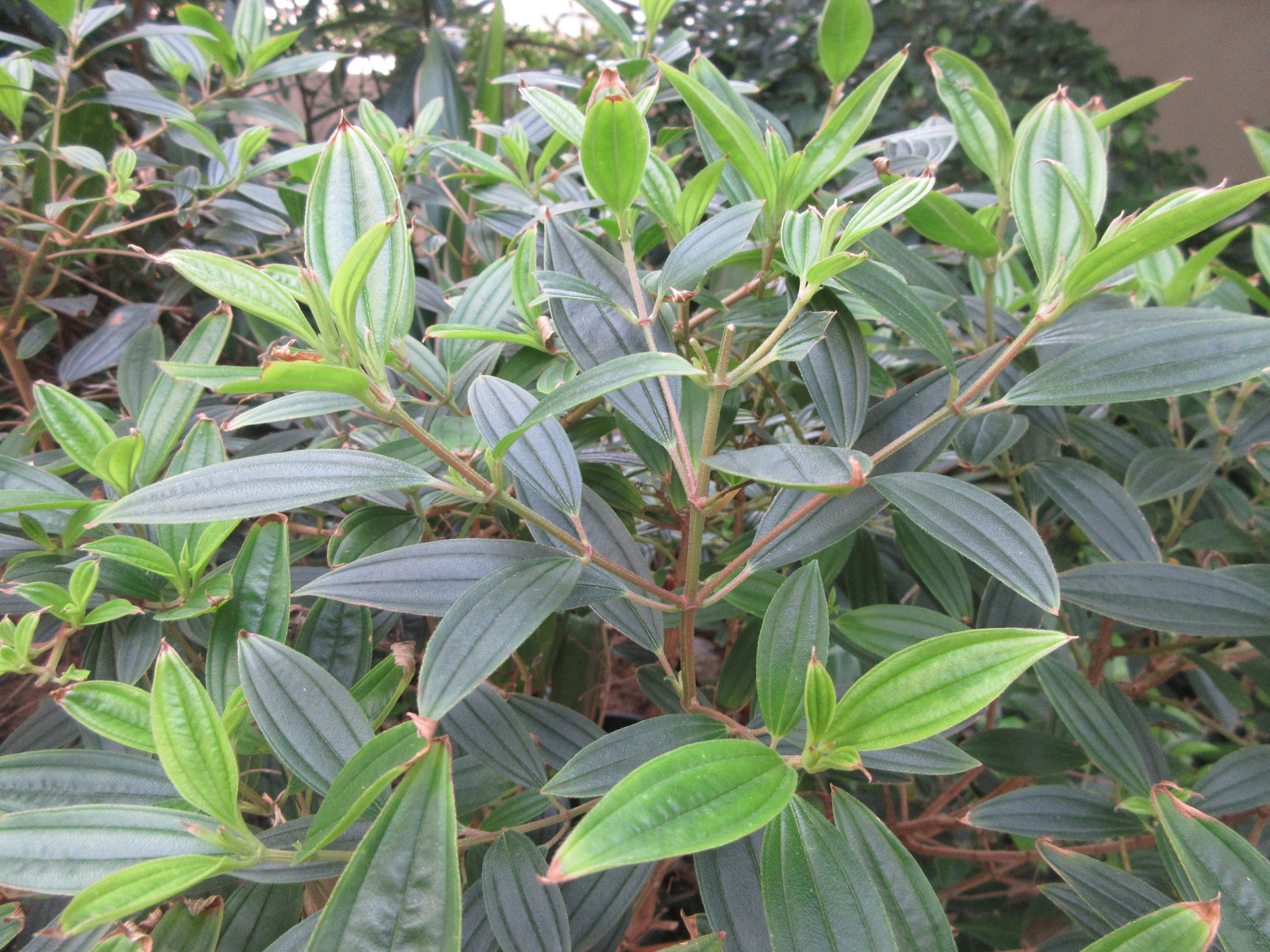
Opposite arrangement (phyllotaxis) of leaves

ob-
A prefix meaning "inversely"; usually the same shape as that described by the word stem, but attached by the narrower end. See obcordate, oblanceolate and obovate.
obconic
(of a fruit, hypanthium, pistil, or calyx) Shaped like an inverted cone, attached at the apex.
obcordate
(of a leaf blade) Broad and notched at the tip; heart-shaped but attached at the pointed end.
obdiplostemonous
Having stamens arranged in two whorls, and having twice as many stamens as petals, with the outer whorl being opposite the petals. Compare diplostemonous and haplostemonous.
oblanceolate
Having a lanceolate shape but broadest in the upper third.
oblate
Having a spherical shape but flattened at the poles.
obligate
(of parasites) Unable to survive without a host. Contrast facultative.
oblique
Slanting; of a leaf or stem, larger on one side of the midrib than the other, in other words asymmetrical.
obloid
Having a three-dimensional oblong shape, e.g. a fruit.
oblong
Having a length a few times greater than the width, with sides almost parallel and ends rounded.
obovate
(of a leaf) Having a length about 1.5 times the width, and widest above the center.
obovoid
Egg-shaped, with narrower portion at base; 3-dimensional object, ovate in all sections through long-axis. Compare ovoid
obsolete
Not evident, or at most rudimentary or vestigial.
obtrapeziform
trapeziform, but attached by the narrower trapezoidal base (e.g. of a leaf)
obtuse
Blunt or rounded; having converging edges that form an angle of more than 90°. Compare acute.
ocrea

A sheath formed from two stipules encircling the node in members of the Polygonaceae.
odd-pinnate

Having an odd number of leaflets in a compound pinnate leaf, such that there is only one terminal leaflet.
oft.
An abbreviation of "often". Compare usu. and s.t..
-oideae
A suffix added to the stem of a generic name to form the name of a subfamily, e.g. Fumaria → Fumarioideae.
olim
Formerly, e.g. "olim B", formerly in the Berlin herbarium (Herbarium Berolinense).
ontogeny
The sequence of developmental stages through which an organism passes as it grows.
operculum (calyptra)
A lid or cover that becomes detached at maturity, e.g. in Eucalyptus, a cap covering the bud and formed by the fusion or cohesion of perianth parts.
opposite
1. Describing leaves or flowers borne at the same level but on directly opposite sides of their common axis.
2. Describing the occurrence of something on the same radius as something else, e.g. anthers opposite sepals. Compare alternate.
opus utique oppressum

Listed after the botanical name of a plant, or the name of a publication, this indicates that a publication is listed in the International Code of Nomenclature for algae, fungi, and plants as a suppressed work. Botanical names of the specified rank in the publication are considered not validly published (article 34).
orbicular
Flat and more or less circular.
order
A group of one or more families sharing common features, ancestry, or both.
ortet
The original single parent plant from which a clone ultimately derives.
orthotropous
Describes an ovule that is erect, with the micropyle directed away from the placenta; atropous. Compare amphitropous, anatropous, and campylotropous.
oval
See elliptical.
ovary
The basal portion of a carpel or group of fused carpels, enclosing the ovules.
ovate
Shaped like a section through the "long axis" of an egg and attached by the wider end.
ovoid
Egg-shaped, with wider portion at base; 3-dimensional object, ovate in all sections through long-axis. Compare obovoid
ovule
Loosely, the seed before fertilization; a structure in a seed plant within which one or more megaspores are formed (after fertilization it develops into a seed).
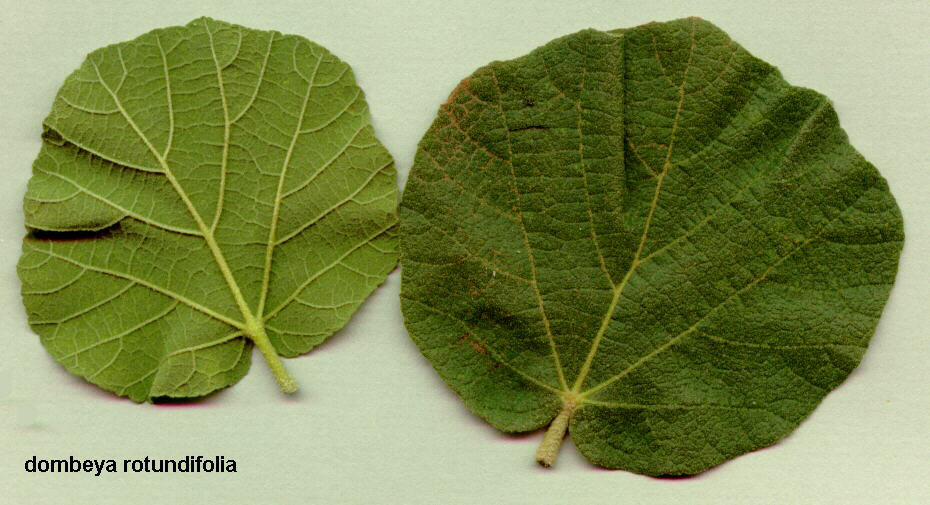
Orbicular leaves of Dombeya rotundifolia

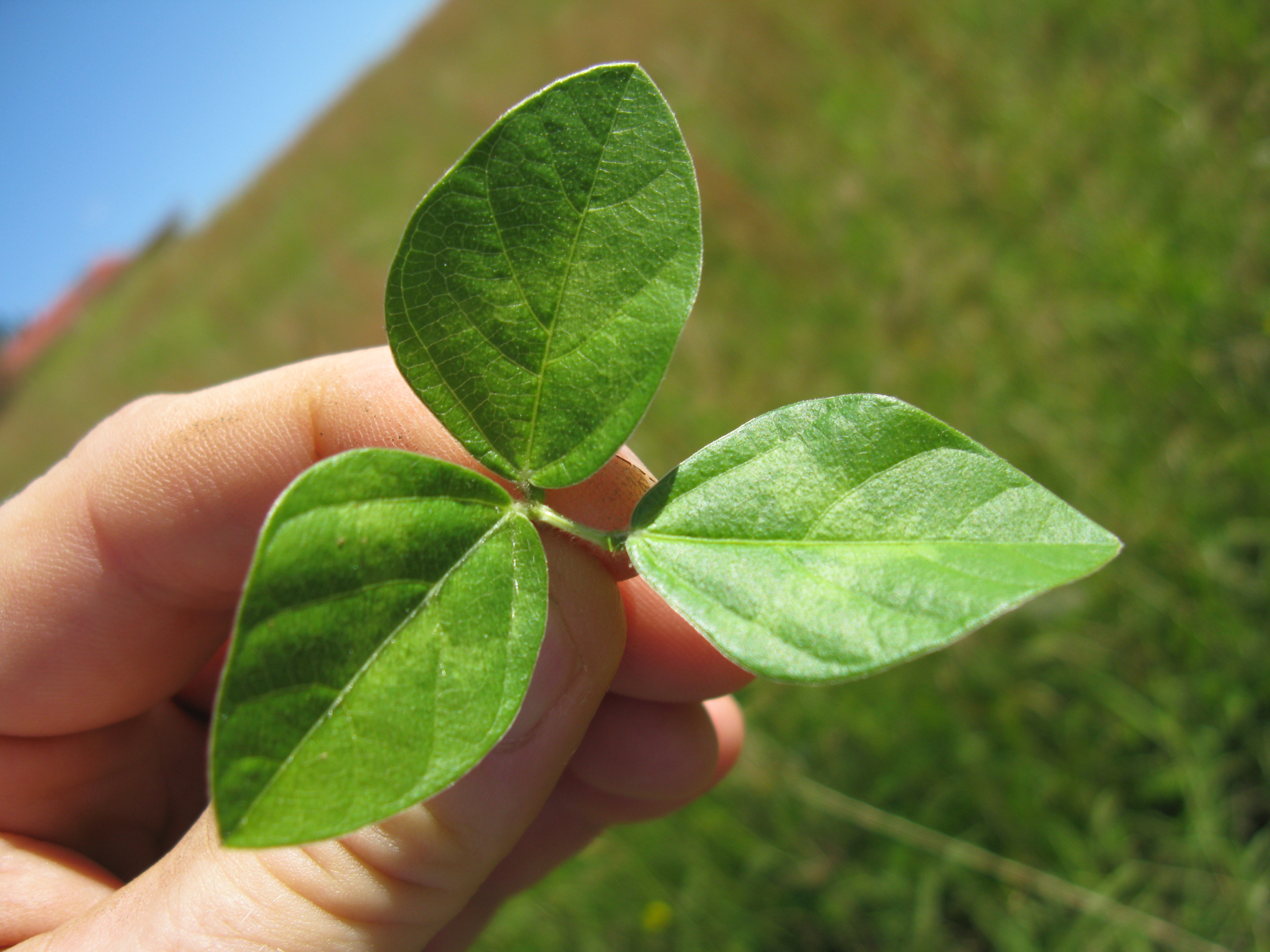
Ovate leaflets on a ternate leaf of a Vigna species

== P ==
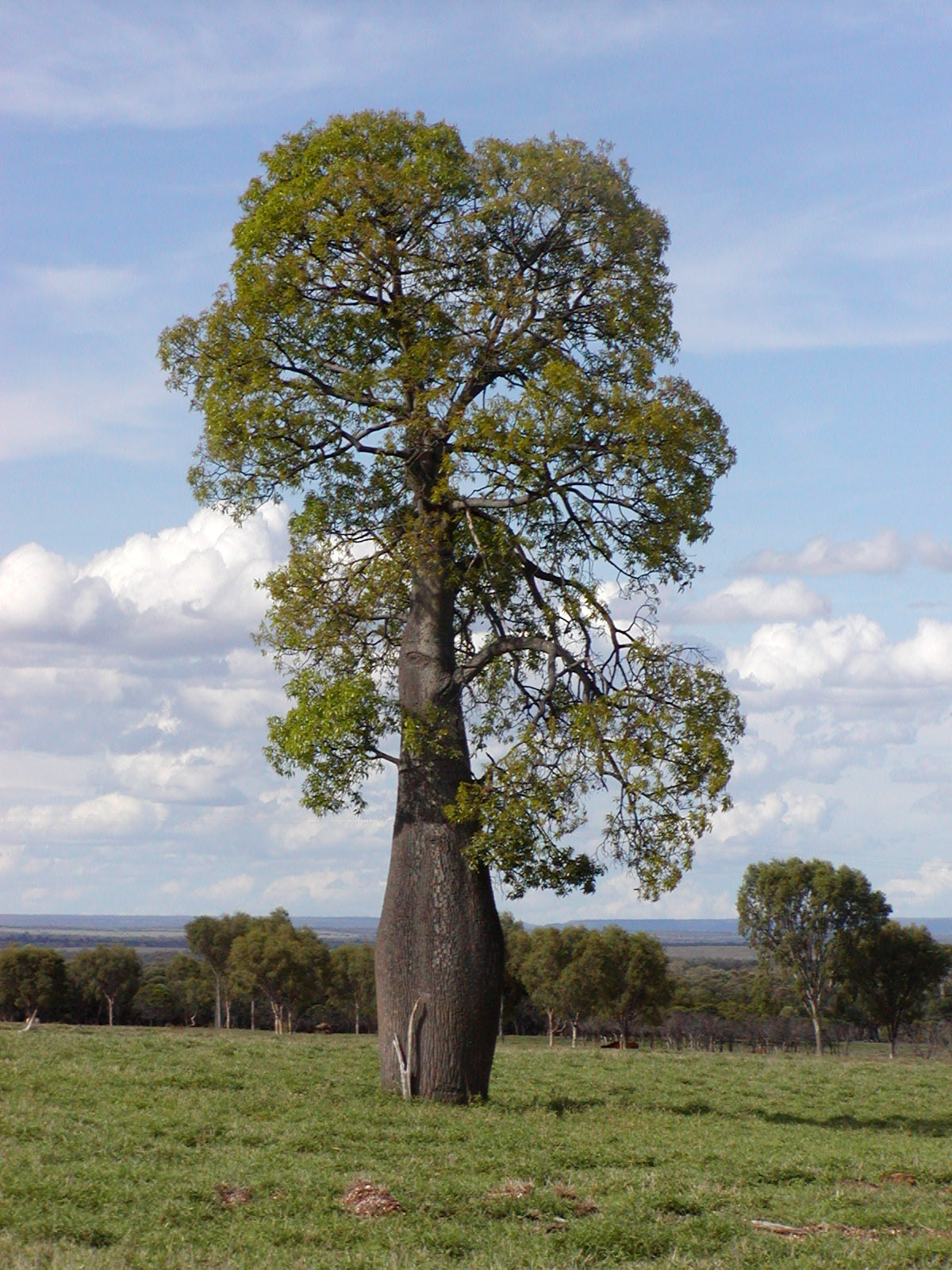
The thick trunk of Brachychiton rupestris accumulates moisture as a means of survival of droughts, and presents a marked example of a pachycaul habit.

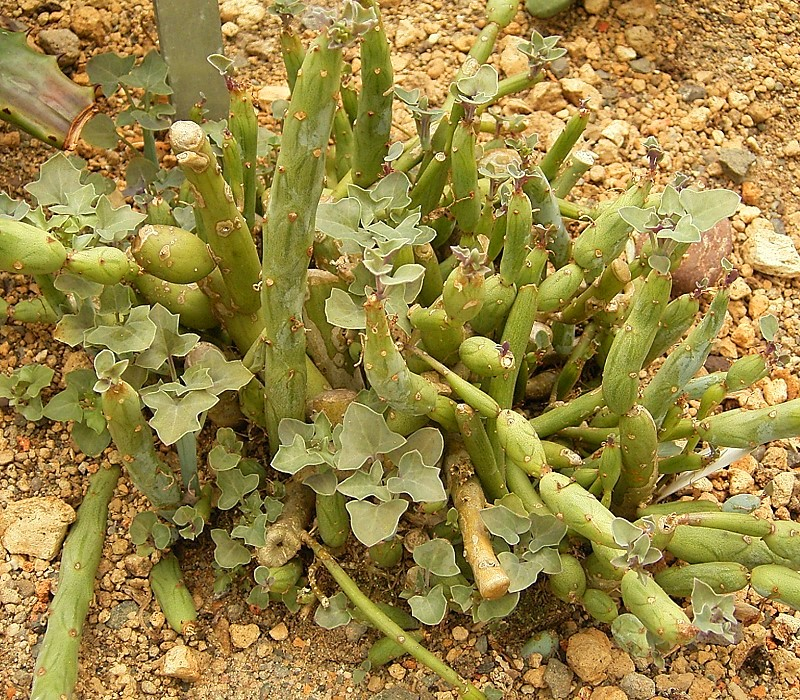
This Curio articulatus is pachycladous in that it has a disproportionately thick stem.

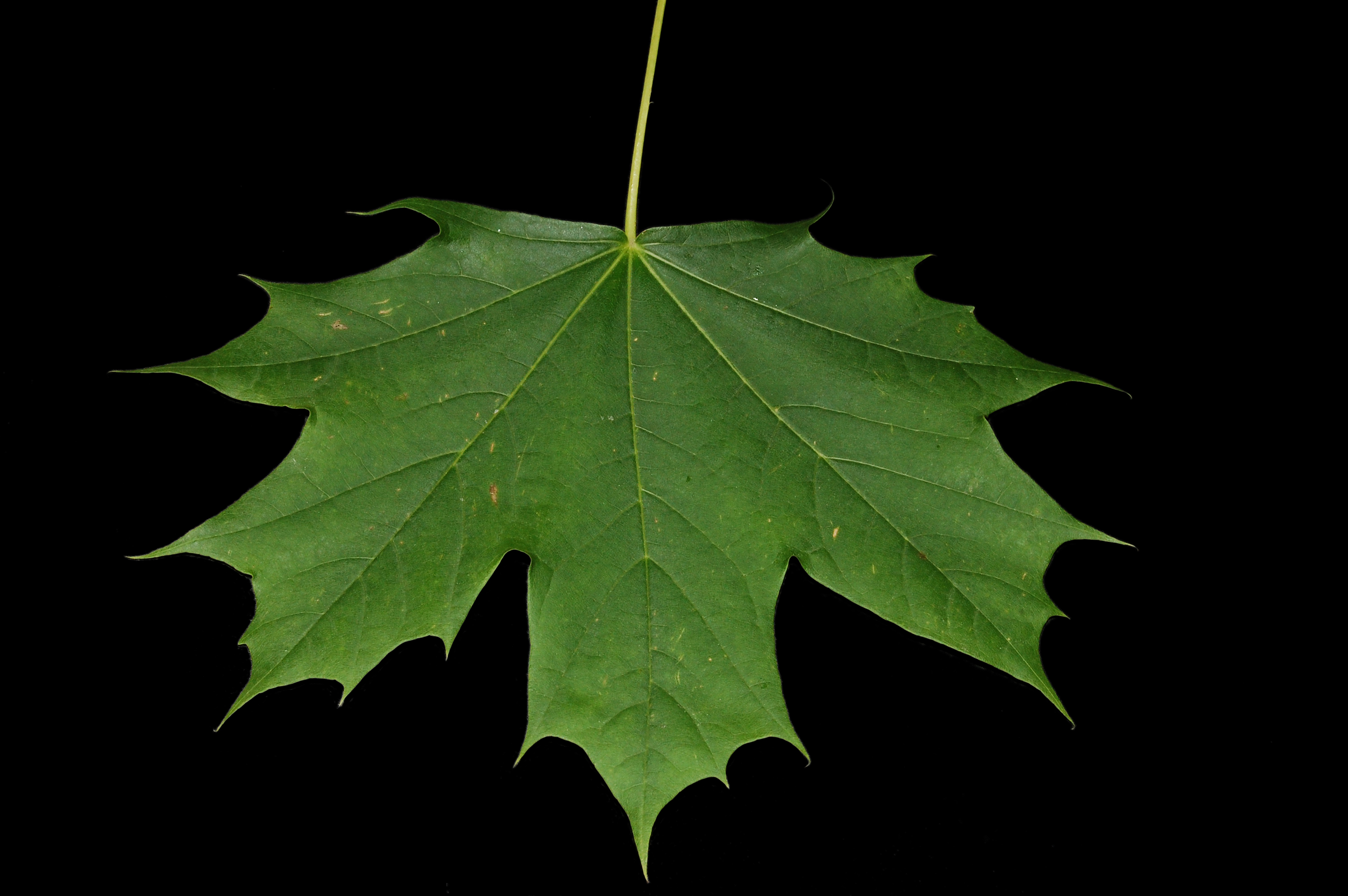
A maple (Acer platanoides) leaf has palmate venation, as its veins radiate out from a central point, like fingers from the palm of a hand.

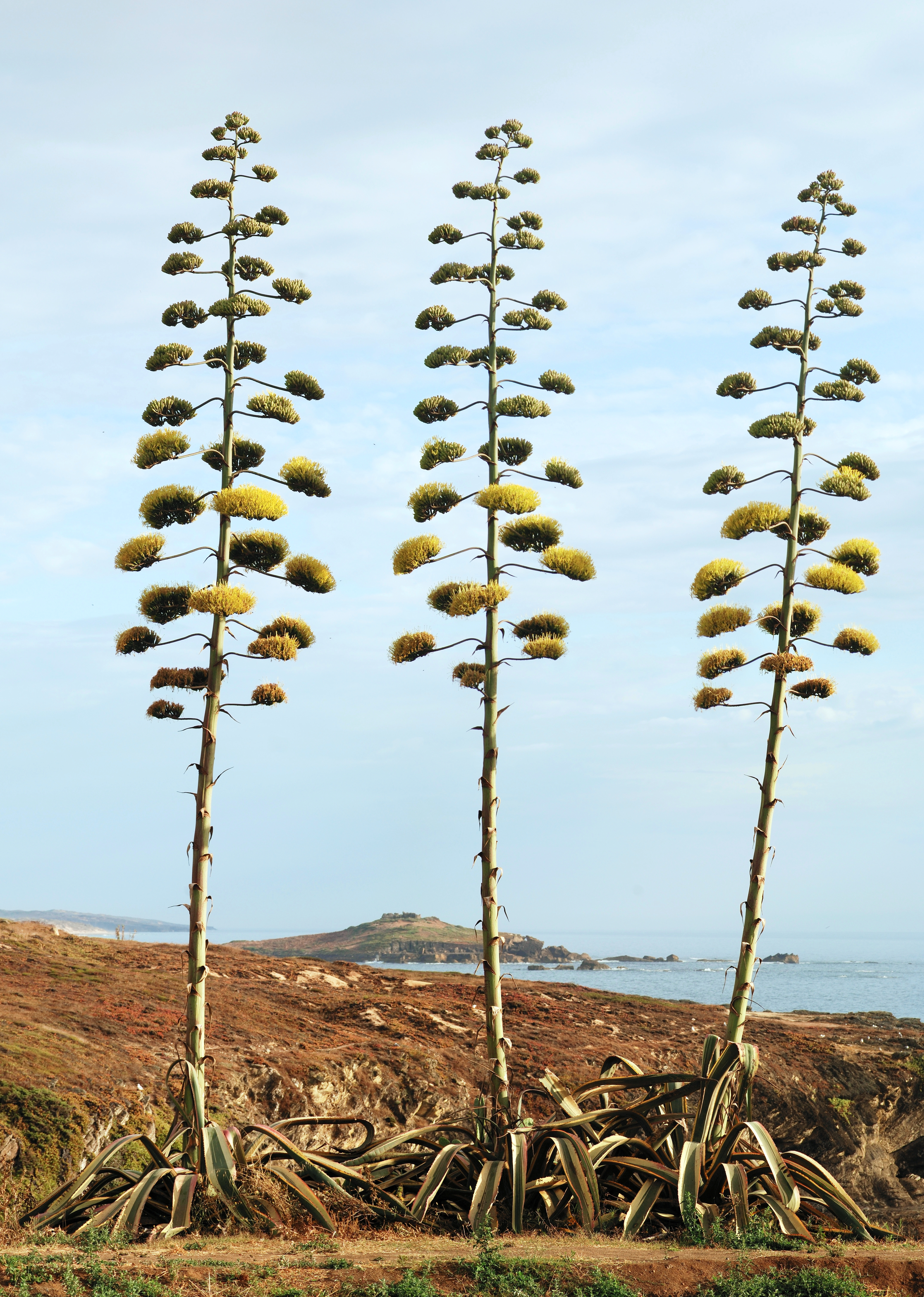
The inflorescence of Agave americana is a giant panicle.

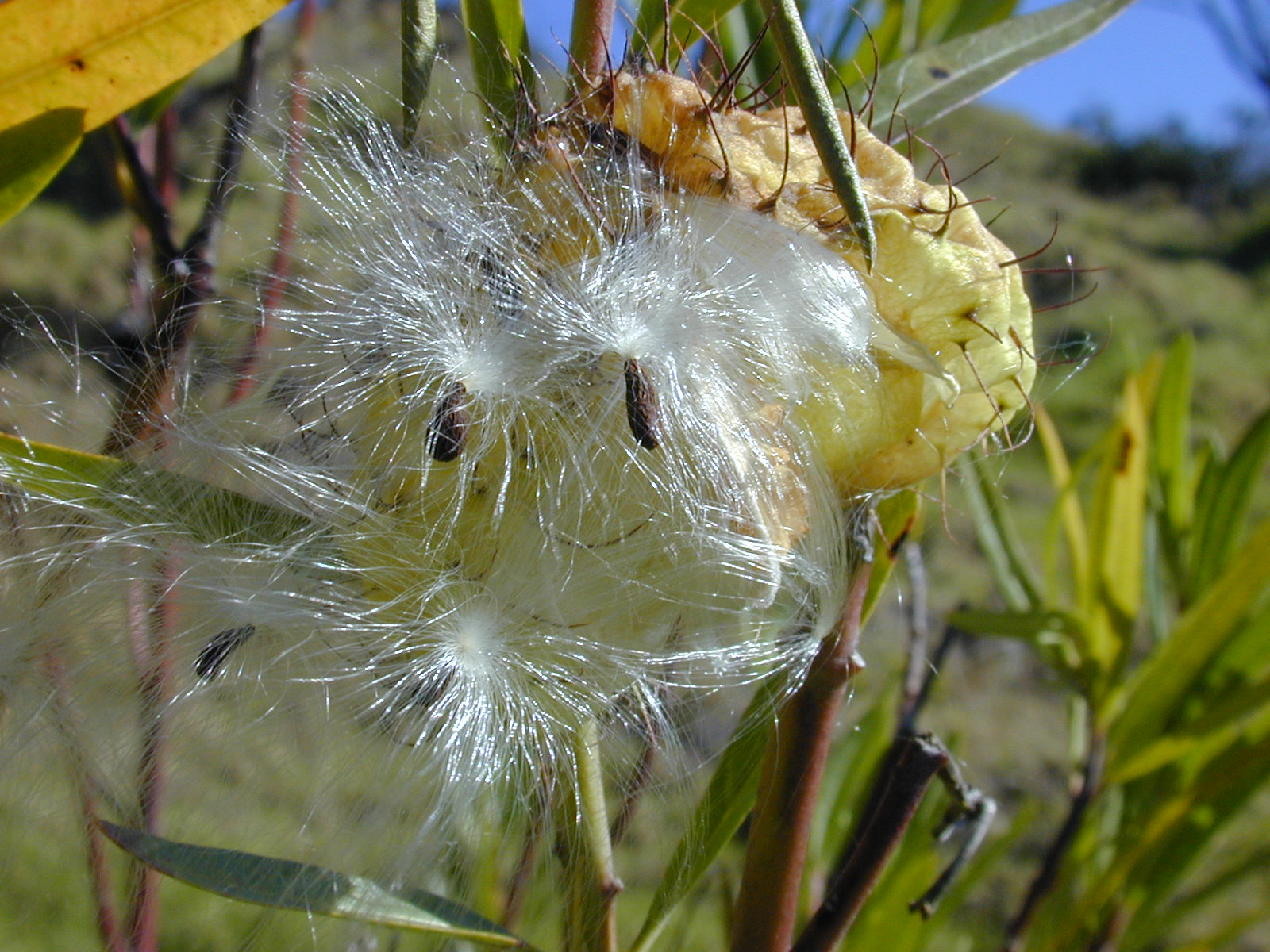
Asclepias physocarpa shedding seeds, each with its silky pappus

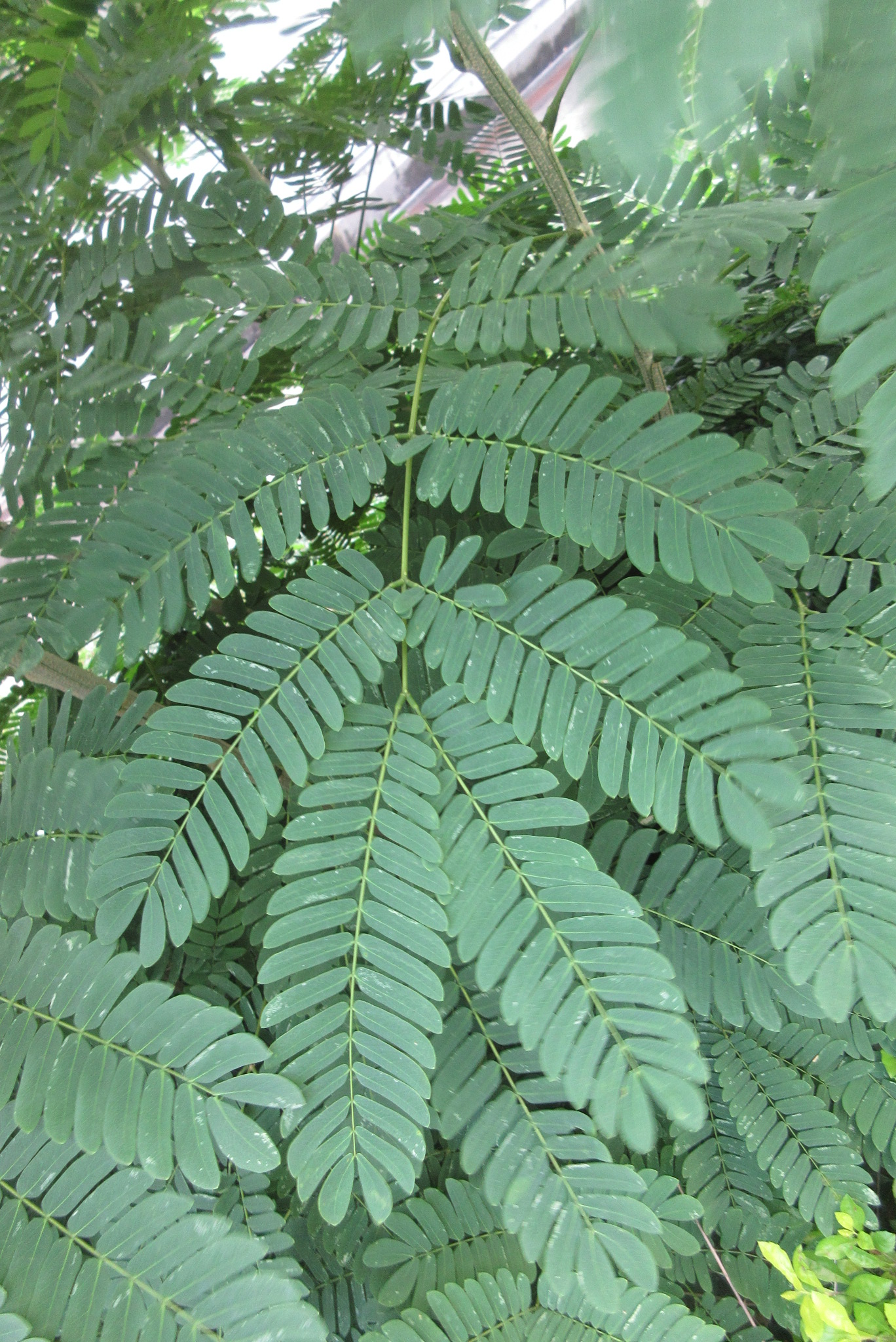
Doubly paripinnate leaves of Delonix regia

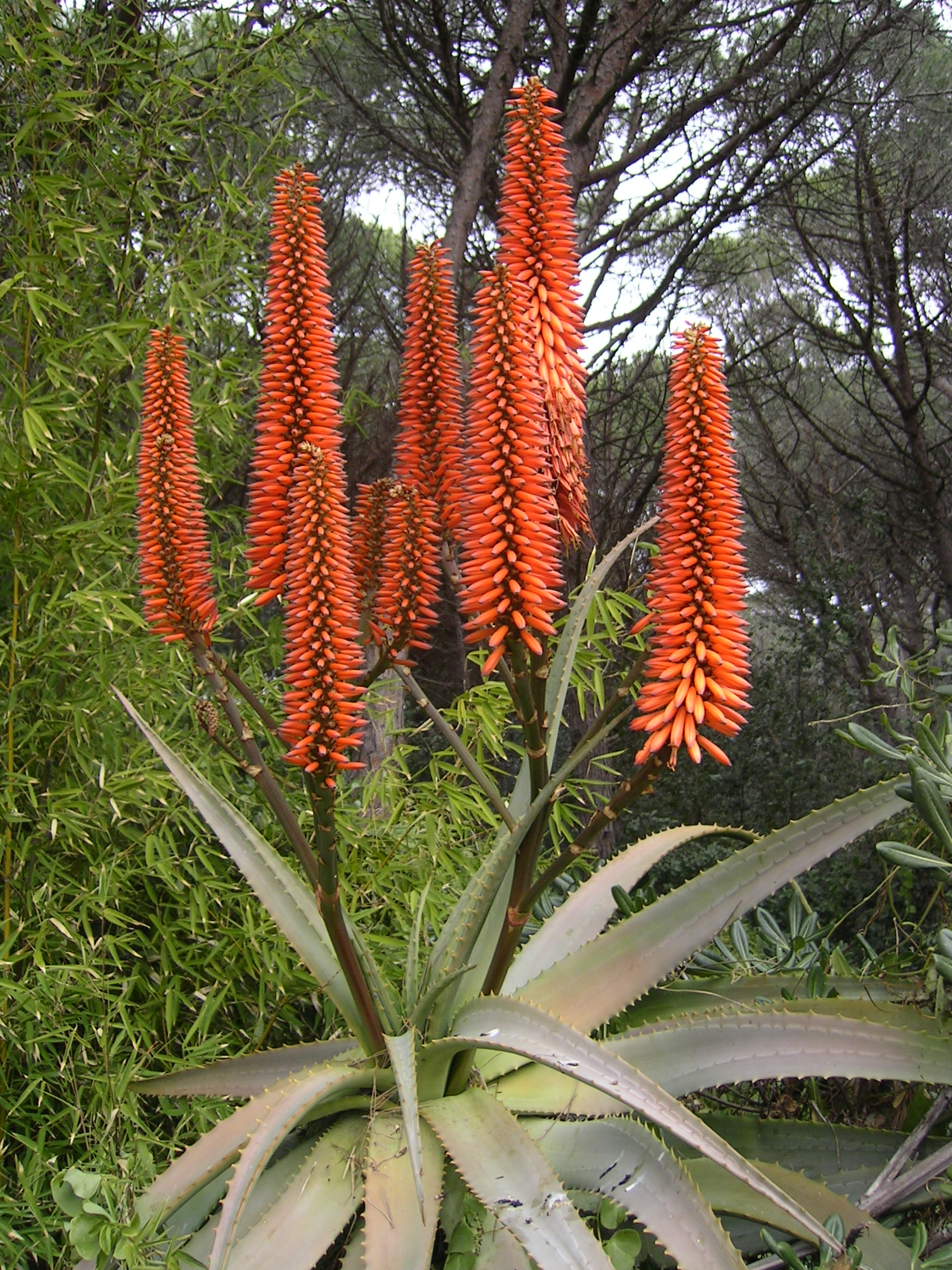
Aloe ferox in flower, bearing two inflorescences on peduncles

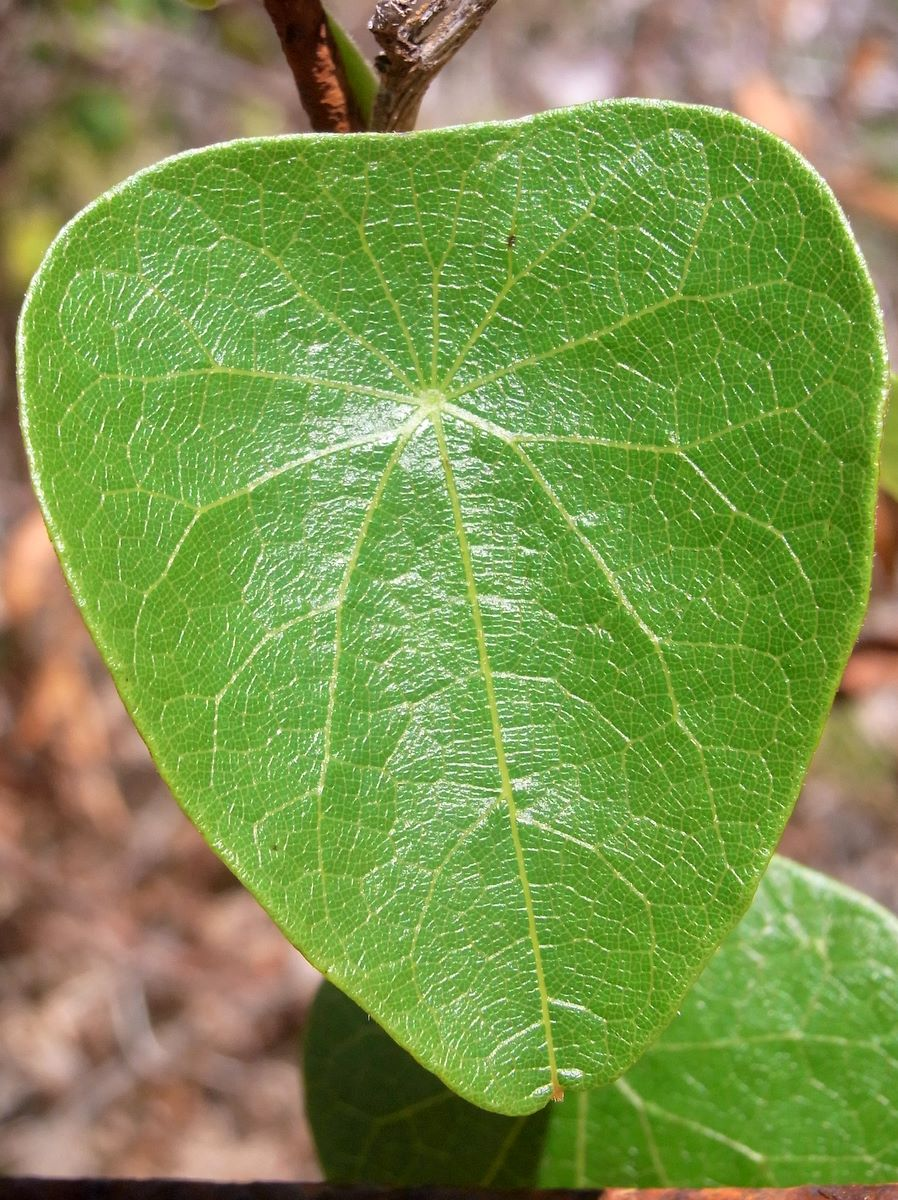
Stephania japonica is a vine with peltate leaves.

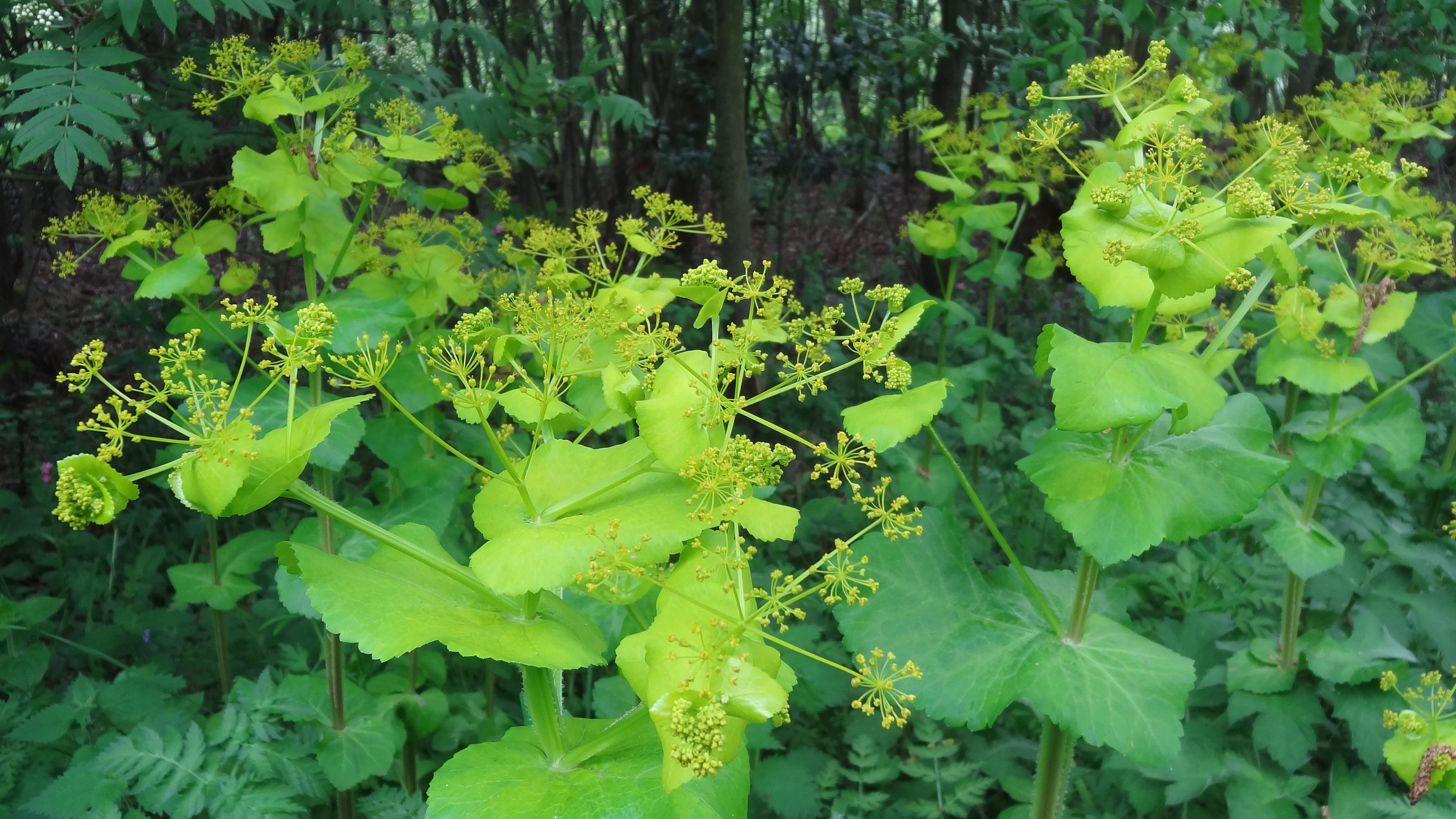
Perfoliate leaves of Smyrnium perfoliatum with stems passing through them

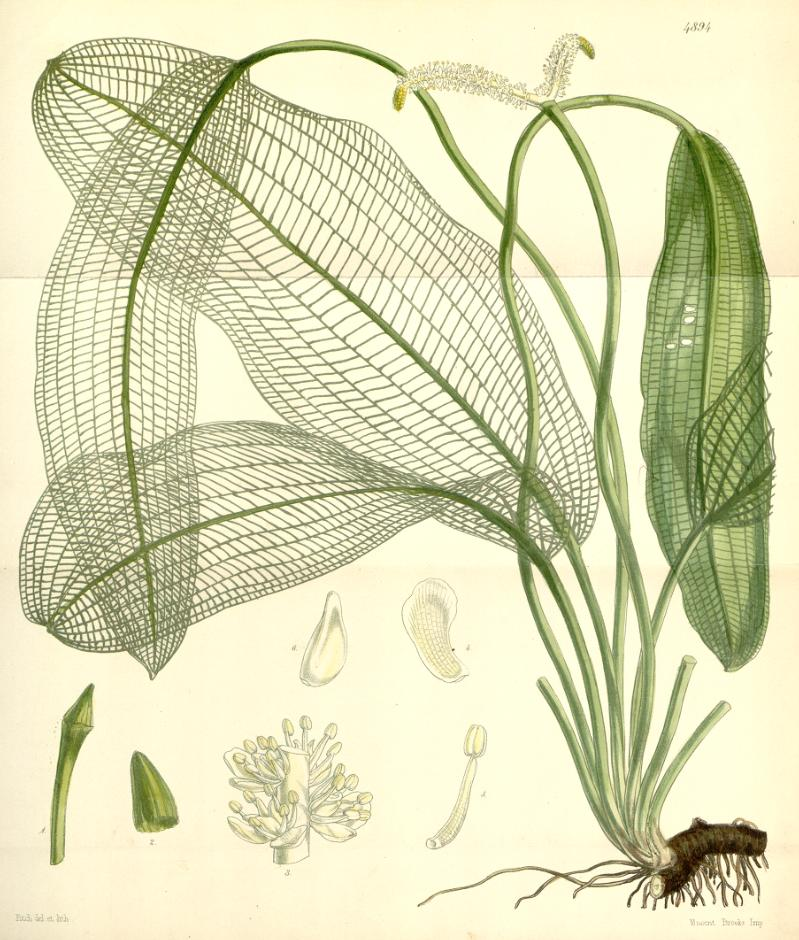
The leaves of Aponogeton madagascariensis are perforate.

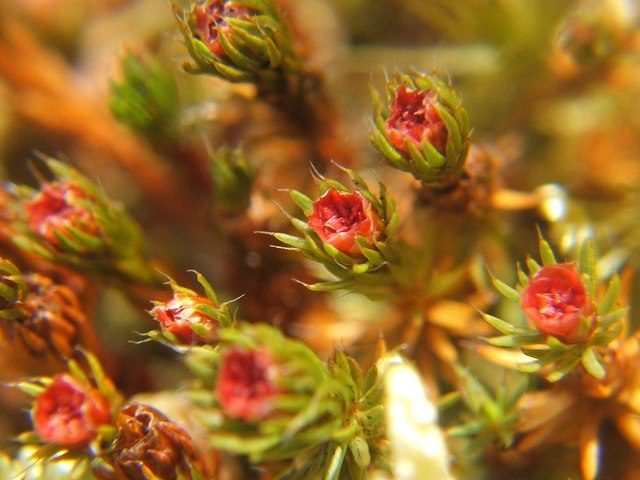
The perigonium of a moss (red in this case), also called a splash-cup, surrounds the antheridia and aids in dispersal of sperm.

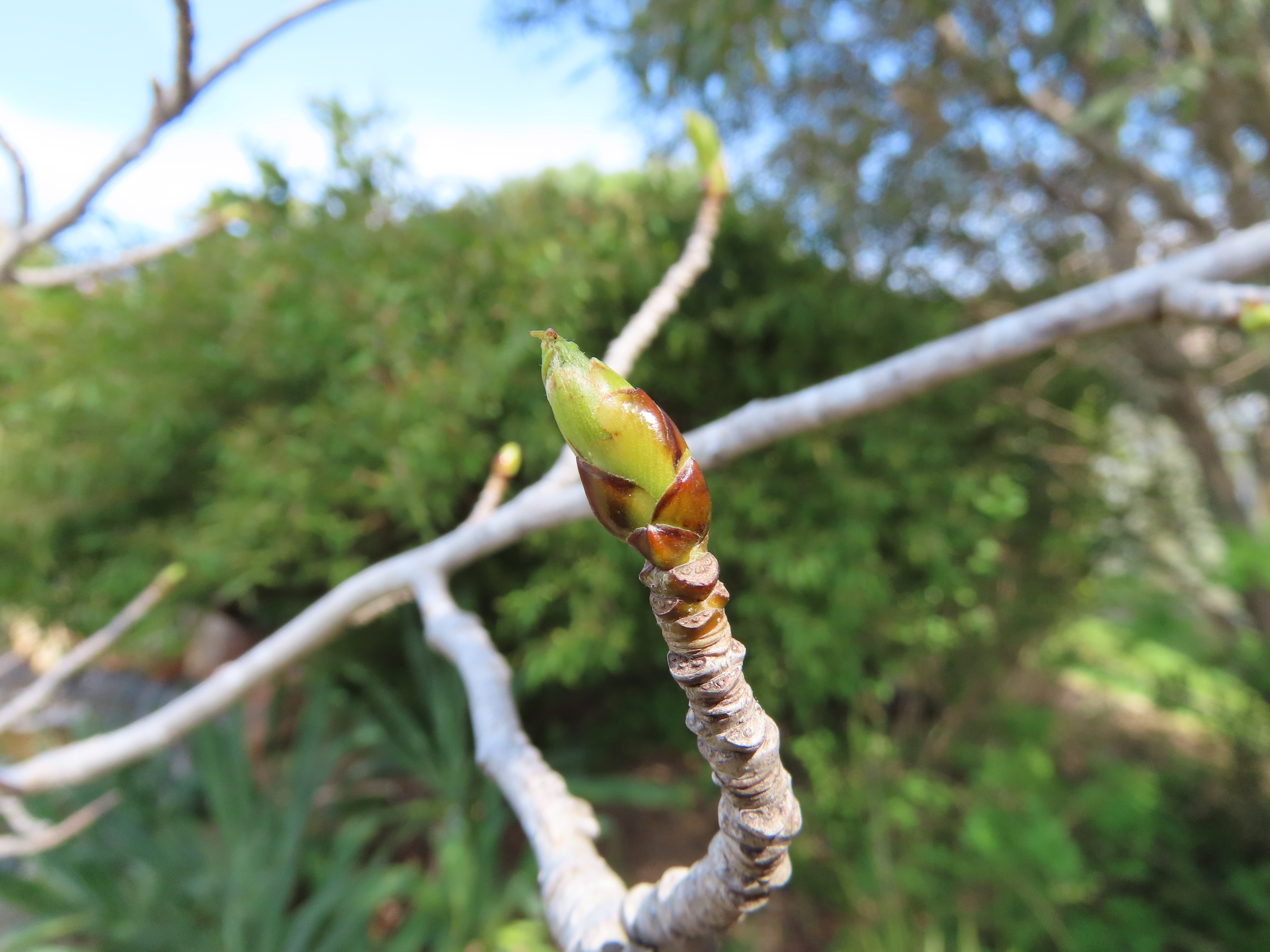
Liquidambar styraciflua bud emerging from its protective brown imbricate cataphyll scales, also known as perules

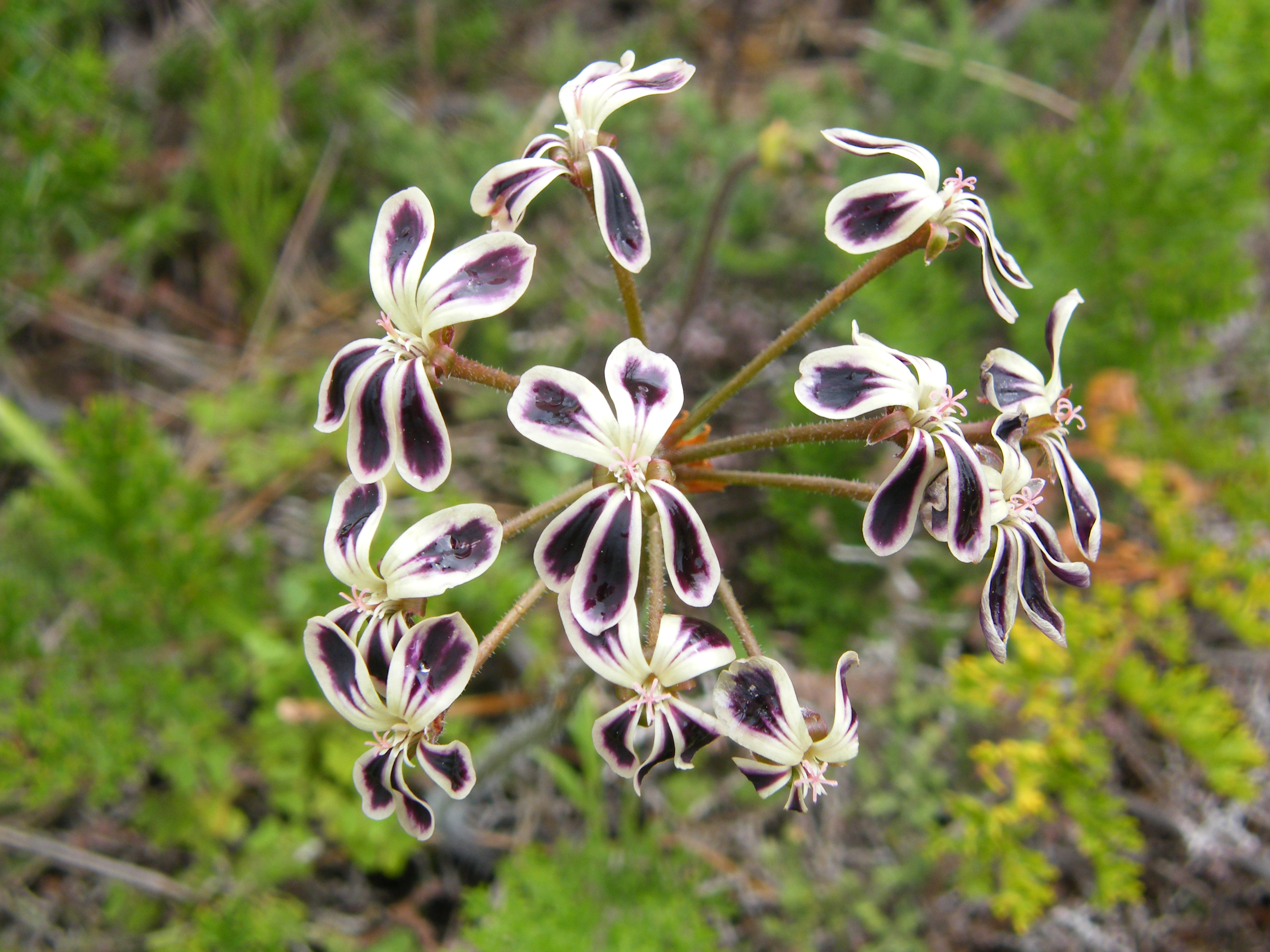
Pelargonium lobatum inflorescence, with showy petals projecting from inconspicuous protective sepals

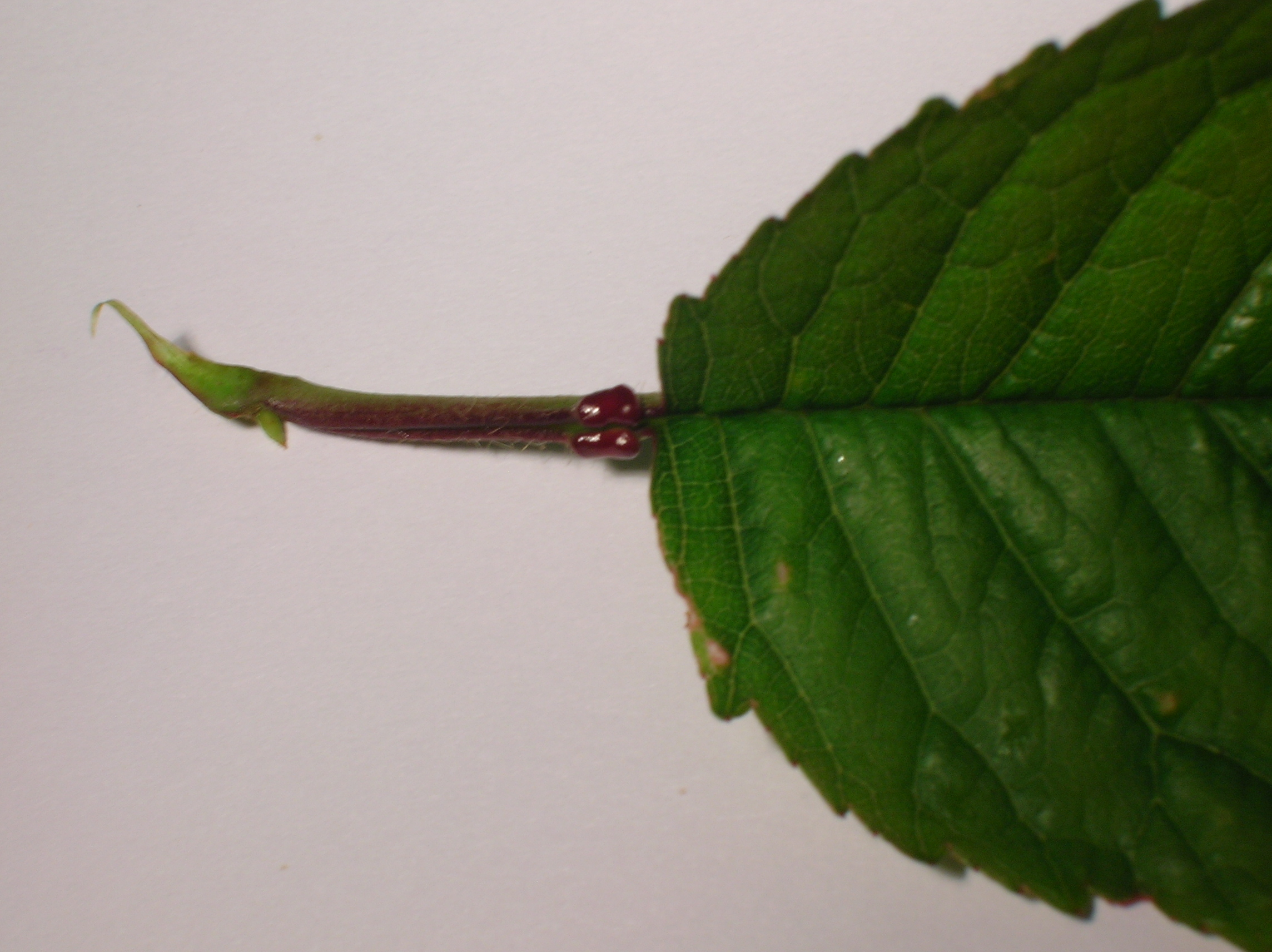
Petiolary glands on the petiole of a cherry leaf

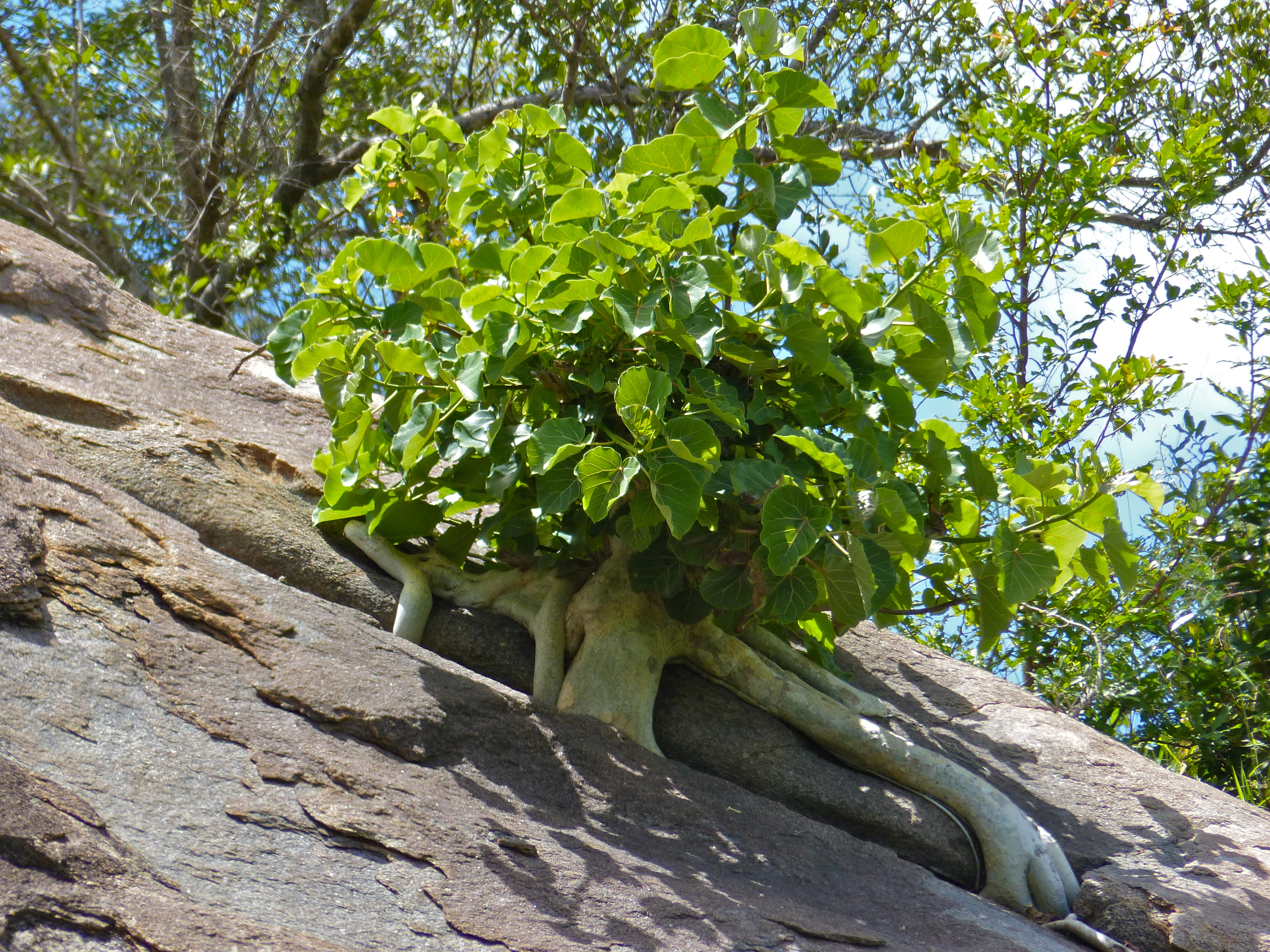
Rock-splitting roots of the petricolous large-leaved rock fig, Ficus abutilifolia

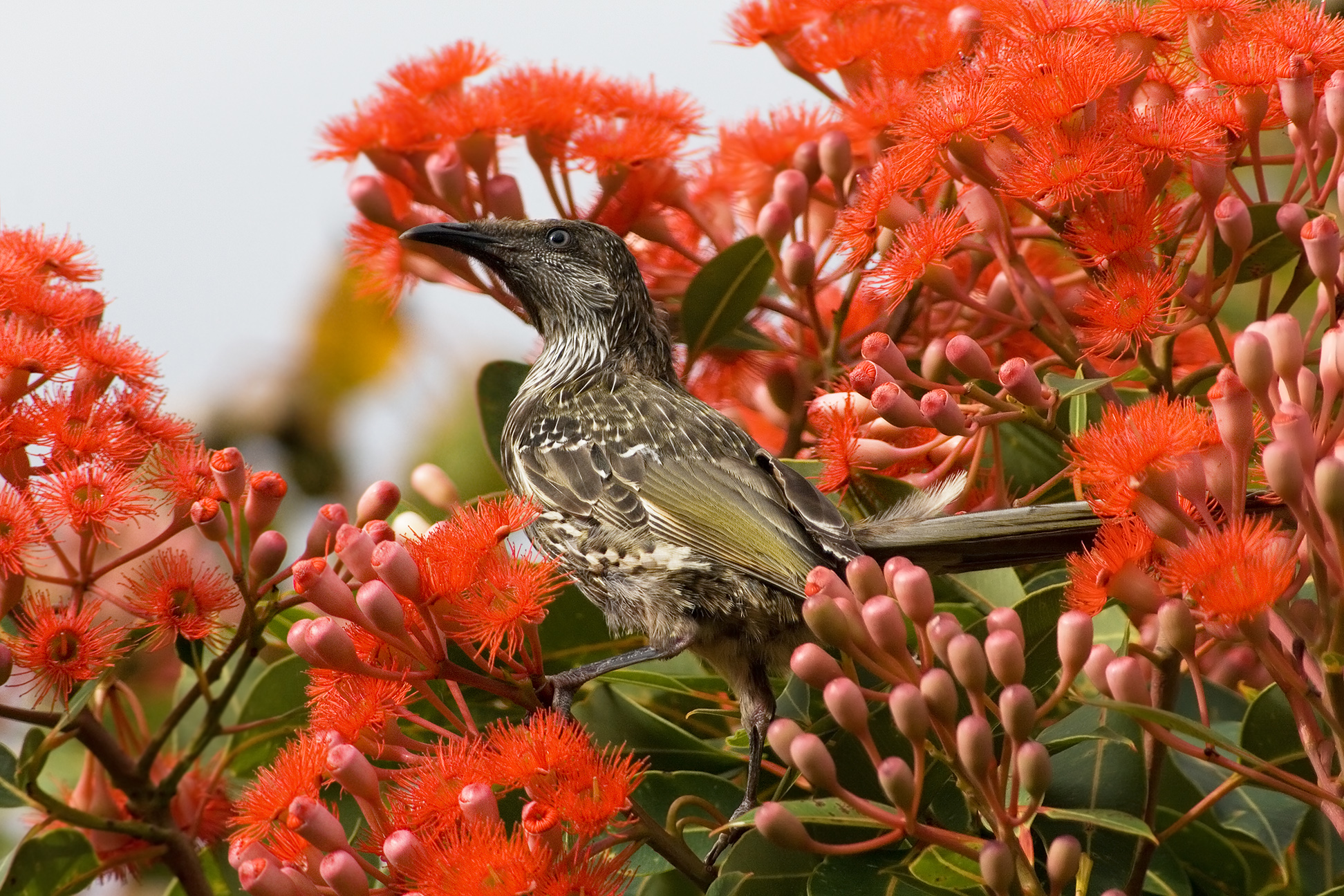
The phaneranthous habit of the red flowering gum, Corymbia ficifolia, can attract pollinators such as the honey eater, Anthochaera chrysoptera, from a considerable distance.

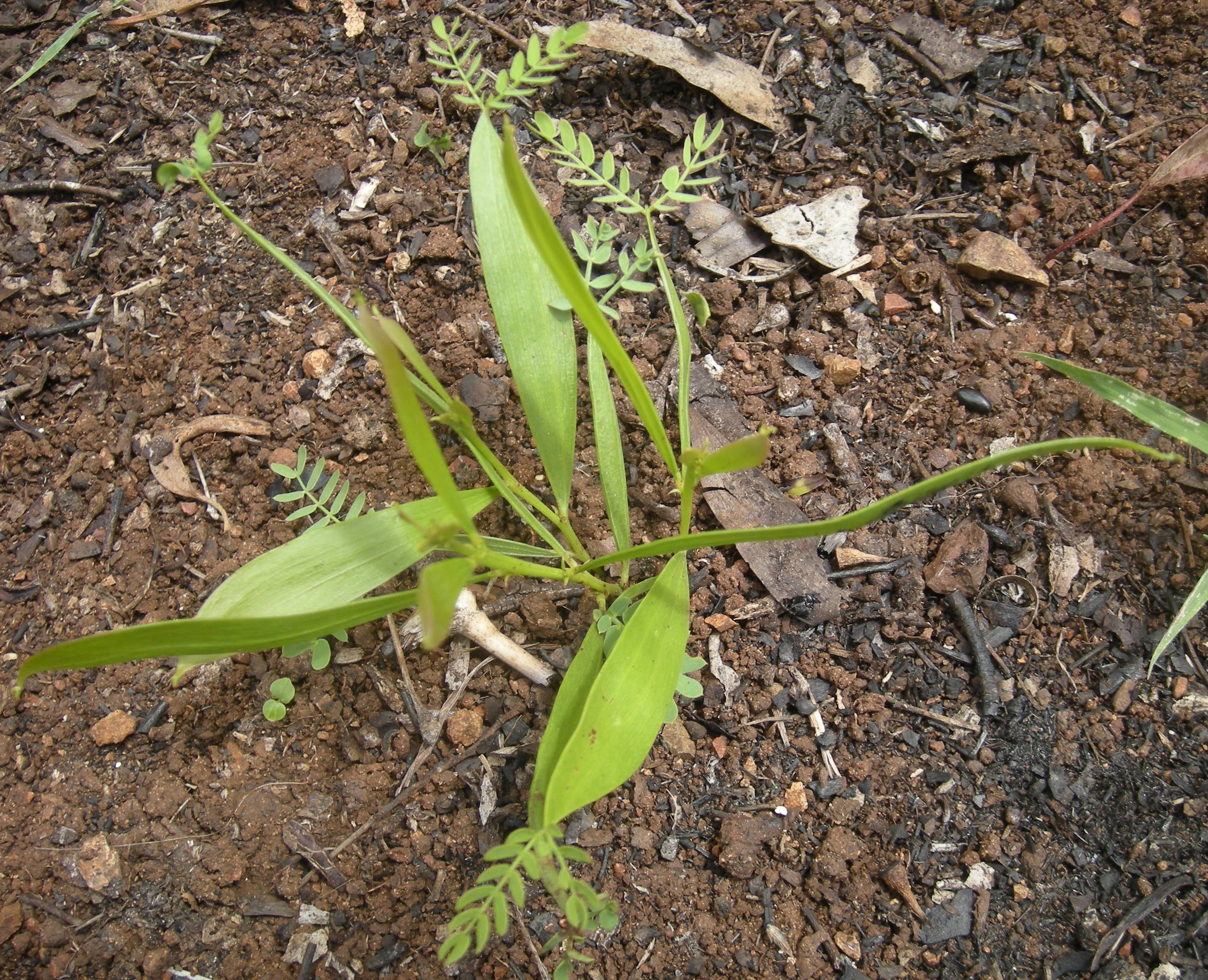
Seedlings of Acacia fasciculifera bear leaves that illustrate the ancestral function of their phyllodes as petioles.

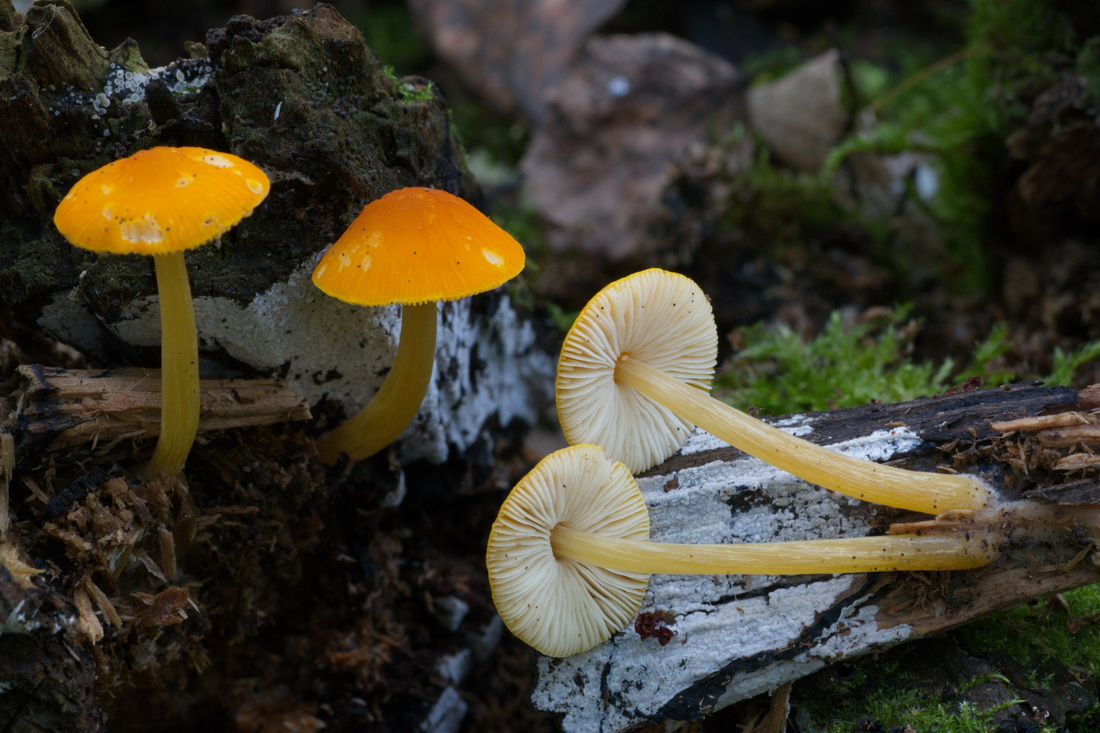
Pileus of the fruiting body of the fungus Pluteus admirabilis

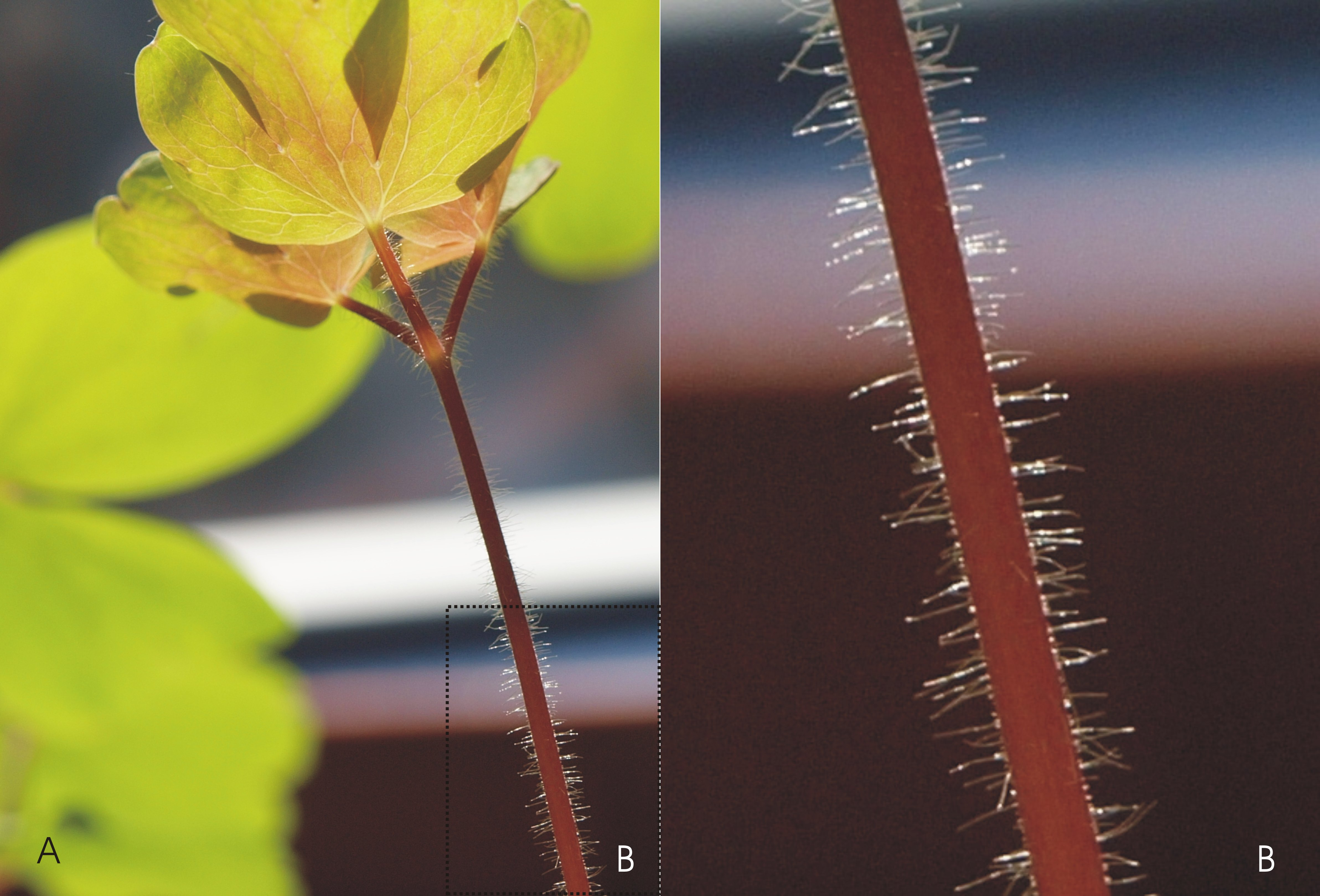
Glandular pilose hairs on the stem of Aquilegia grata

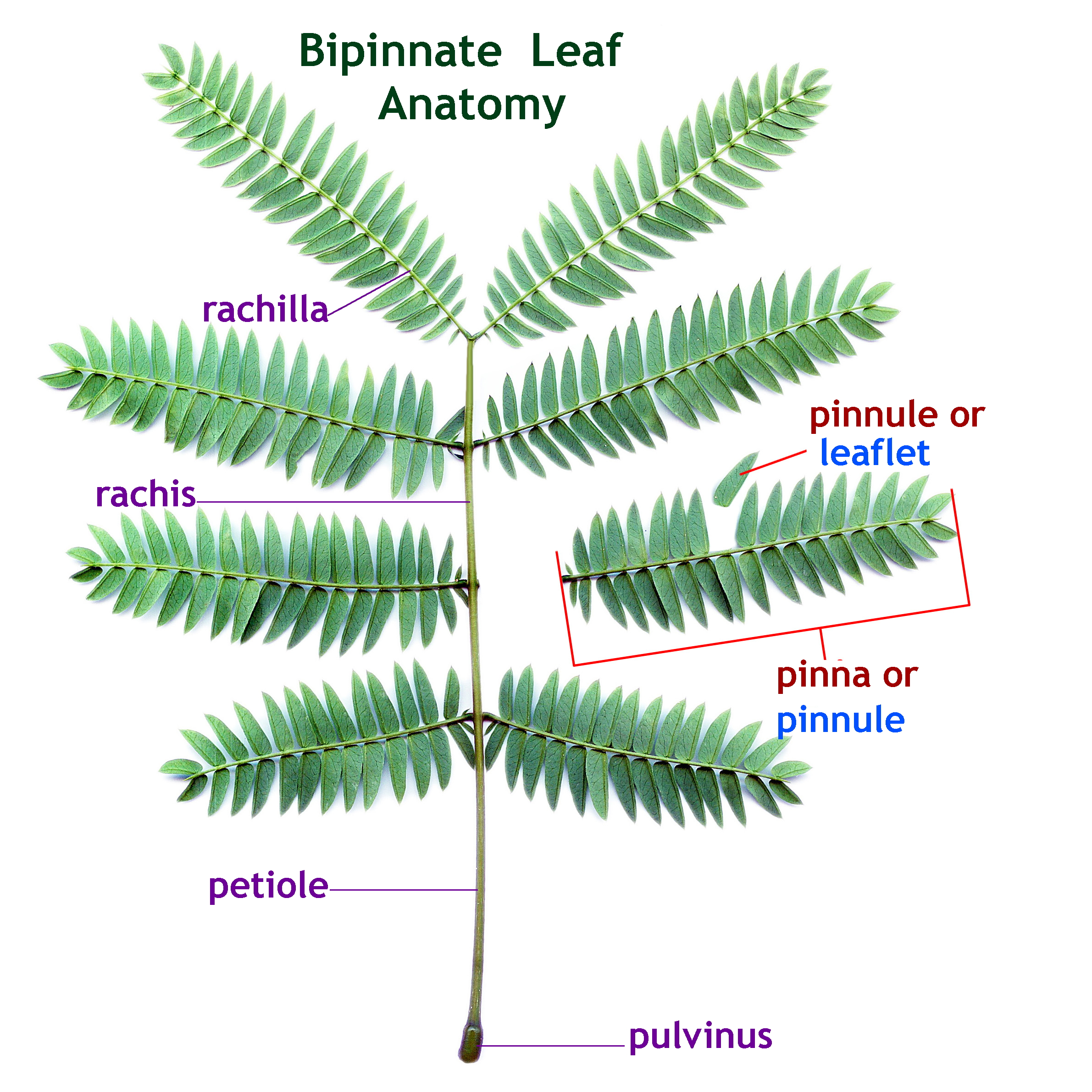
Bipinnate leaf anatomy showing a pinna (or pinnule)

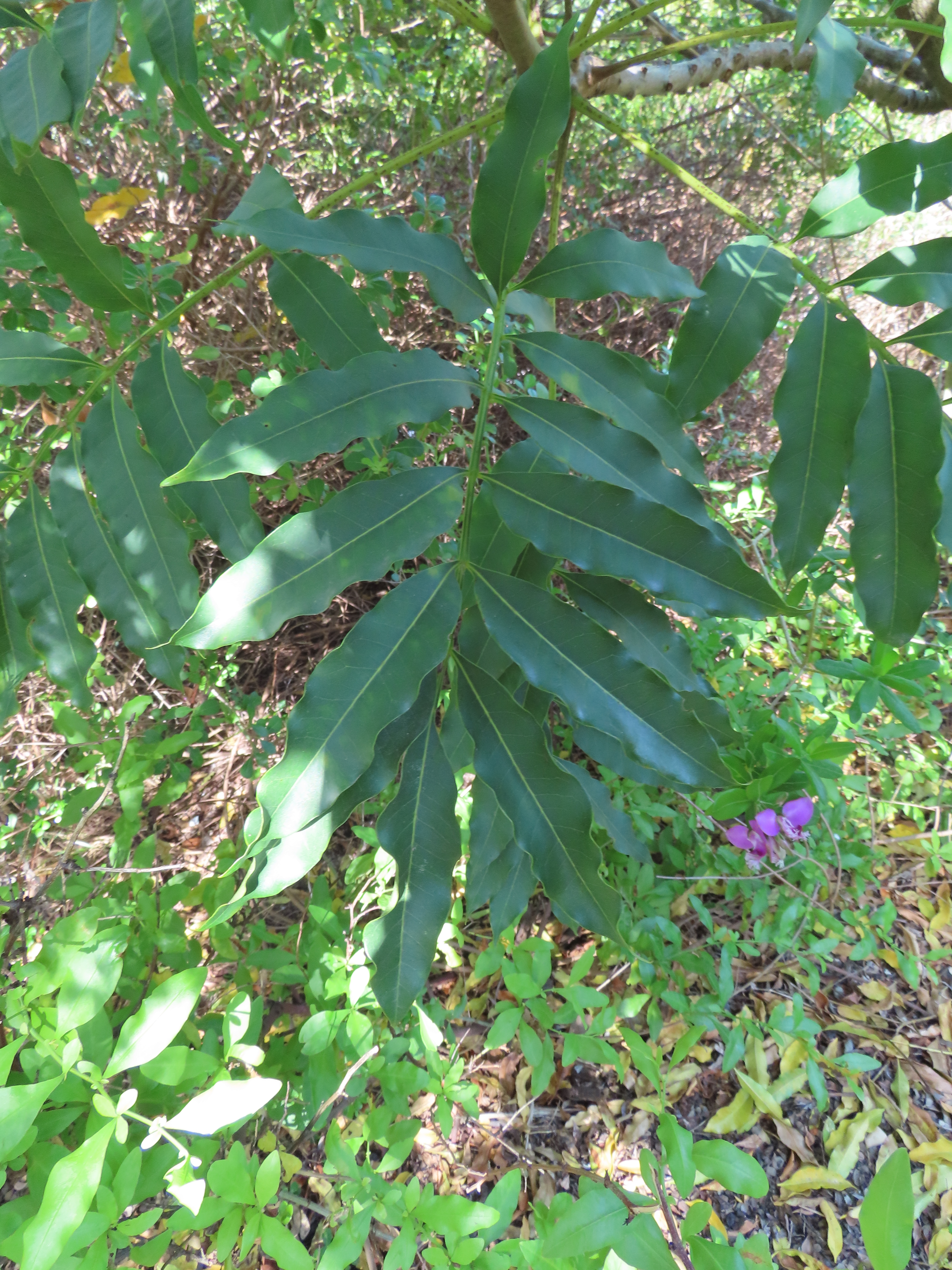
Simple pinnate leaf of Ekebergia capensis

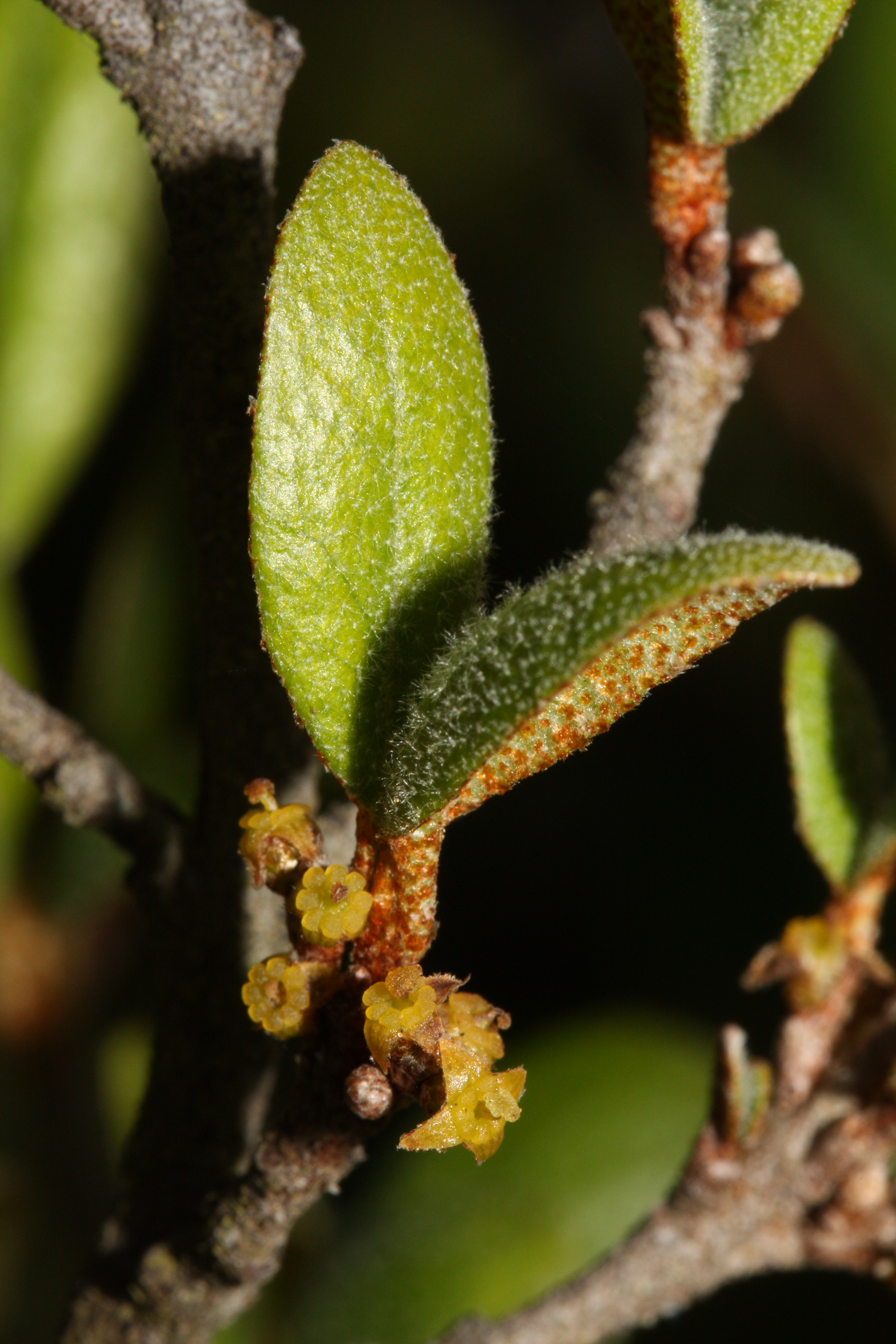
Pistillate flowers of Shepherdia canadensis. Compare staminate flower.

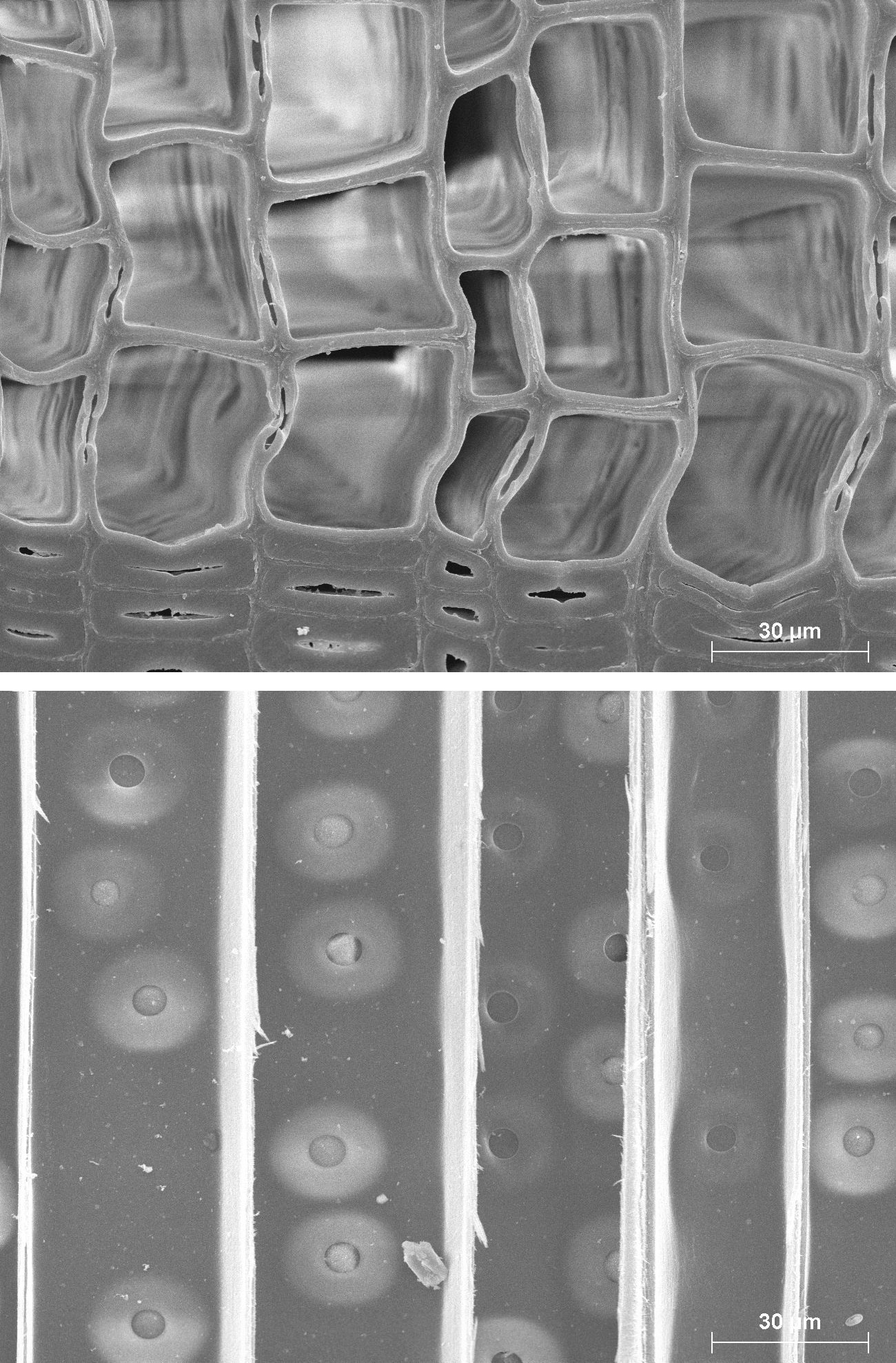
Electron micrographs of sections of wood of a conifer (Picea abies) show pits in the tracheid walls.

pachycaul
with a disproportionately thick trunk
pachycladous
with disproportionately thick stems
palate
An expanded lower lip of a flower that nearly or entirely blocks the opening of a flower tube, as in a snapdragon flower.
palea

1. The upper of two bracts enclosing a grass flower, major contributors to chaff in harvested grain.
2. Chaffy scales on the receptacles of many Asteraceae.
3. Chaffy scales on the stipe of many ferns.
paleate
Bearing paleae or chaffy scales, as in description of the receptacle of a capitulum of a plant in the Asteraceae.
paleaceous
Chaff-like in texture.
palmate
1. leaf with veins radiating out from a central point (usually at the top of a petiole), resembling spread out fingers pointing away from the palm.
2. A compound palmate leaf has leaflets that radiate from a central point (usually at the top of a petiole).
palmatifid
Deeply divided into several lobes arising from more or less the same level.
palmatisect
Intermediate between palmate and palmatifid, i.e. the segments are not fully separated at the base; often more or less digitate.
pandurate
shaped like the body of a fiddle (mainly, of plant leaves)
panicle

A compound raceme; an indeterminate inflorescence in which the flowers are borne on branches of the main axis or on further branches of these.
papilionate
Butterfly-like; having a corolla like that of a pea.
papilla

A small, elongated protuberance on the surface of an organ, usually an extension of one epidermal cell.
pappus
In daisy florets, a tuft or ring of hairs or scales borne above the ovary and outside the corolla (representing the reduced calyx); a tuft of hairs on a fruit.
paracarpel
Ill-defined term, variously interpreted and applied to: organs attached to carpels; staminodes close to the gynoecium; and to a pistillode in a staminate flower
paraperigonium

An anomalous secondary outgrowth of the perianthal meristem with ramifying vasculature. See also perigonium, perianth, and corona.
parasite
An organism living on or in a different organism, from which it derives nourishment. Some plant species are parasitic. Compare saprophyte and epiphyte.
parenchyma
A versatile ground tissue composed of living primary cells which performs a wide variety of structural and biochemical functions in plants.
parietal
Attached to the marginal walls of a structure, e.g. ovules attached to placentas on the wall of the ovary. See placentation.
paripinnate
Having an even number of leaflets (or pinnae), i.e. terminated by a pair of pinnae as opposed to a single pinna. Compare imparipinnate.
parthenocarpy
The development or production of fruit without fertilization. Compare stenospermocarpy.
patent

Spreading; standing at 45–50° to the axis. See also erecto-patent.
patulous
See patent.
pauciflor
Having few flowers per inflorescence. Compare pluriflor and uniflor.
pectinate
Pinnately divided with narrow segments closely set like the teeth of a comb.
pedate
Having a terminal lobe or leaflet, and on either side of it an axis curving outward and backward, bearing lobes or leaflets on the outer side of the curve.
pedicel

The stalk of a flower; may also be applied to the stalk of a capitulum in the Asteraceae.
peduncle

The stalk of an inflorescence.
peltate
Shield-like, with the stalk attached to the lower surface and not to the margin.
pellucid
Transmitting light; for example, said of tiny gland dots in the leaves of e.g. Myrtaceae and Rutaceae that are visible when held in front of a light.
pendulous
Hanging, for example an ovule attached to a placenta on the top of the ovary. Compare suspended.
penicillate
Tufted like an artist's brush; with long hairs toward one end.
penninervation

With pinnately arranged veins.
pentamerous
In five parts, particularly with respect to flowers, five parts in each whorl. See also trimerous and tetramerous.
pepo
A type of berry formed from an inferior ovary and containing many seeds, usually large with a tough outer skin (e.g. a cucumber, pumpkin or watermelon).
perennating
Of an organ that survives vegetatively from season to season. A period of reduced activity between seasons is usual.
perennial
A plant whose life span extends over several years.
perfect
(of a flower) Bisexual; containing both male and female reproductive parts in the same inflorescence. Contrast imperfect.
perfoliate
With its base wrapped around the stem (so that the stem appears to pass through it), e.g. of leaves and bracts.
perforate
With many holes. Used to describe the texture of pollen exine, and also to indicate that tracheary elements have a perforation plate. See also fenestrate.
perforation plate
in a tracheary element, part of the cell wall that is perforated; present in vessel members but not in tracheids. Should not be confused with a pit.
perianth
The collective term for the calyx and corolla of a flower (generally used when the two are too similar to be easily distinguishable). Abbreviation: P; for instance, P 3+3 indicates the calyx and corolla each have 3 elements, i.e. 3 sepals + 3 petals.
pericarp
The wall of a fruit, developed from the ovary wall.
periclinal
Curved along parallel to a surface. Compare anticlinal.
pericycle
A cylinder of parenchyma or sclerenchyma cells that lies just inside the endodermis and is the outer most part of the stele of plants.
perigonium
In flowering plants, synonym of perianth.
2. In mosses, the leaves surrounding the antheridia, also called a splash-cup, e.g. in Polytrichum juniperinum.
perigynium
A sac from a modified tubular bract, or when fully closed an utricle, around the pistillate flower of sedges
perigynous
Borne around the ovary, i.e. of perianth segments and stamens arising from a cup-like or tubular extension of receptacle (free from the ovary but extending above its base). Compare epigynous and hypogynous.
persistent
Remaining attached to the plant beyond the usual time of falling, for instance sepals not falling after flowering, flower parts remaining through maturity of fruit. Compare deciduous and caducous.
perule

1. The scales covering a leaf or flower bud, or a reduced scale-like leaf surrounding the bud. Buds lacking perulae are referred to as "naked".
2. In Camellias the final bracts and sepals become indistinguishable and are called perules.
3. A kind of sac formed by the adherent bases of the two lateral sepals in certain orchids.
petal
In a flower, one of the segments or divisions of the inner whorl of non-fertile parts surrounding the fertile organs, usually soft and conspicuously colored. Compare sepal, tepal.
petalody
The transformation of reproductive organs of flower into petals.
petaloid
Like a petal; soft in texture and colored conspicuously.
petiolary (or petiolar)
Associated with a petiole, as in petiolary glands.
petiolate
(of a leaf) Having a petiole. Contrast sessile.
petiole
The stalk of a leaf.
petiolule
The stalk of a leaflet.
petricolous
Rock-dwelling; living on or among rocks.
phaneranthous
Showy, as in showy flowers that advertise to pollinators, as opposed to aphananthous (unshowy)
phanerogam
Gymnosperms and angiosperms; plants producing stamens and gynoecia; literally plants with conspicuous sexual reproductive organs. Compare cryptogams.
phenology
The study of the timing of seasonal biological phenomena, such as flowering, leaf emergence, fruit ripening and leaf fall.
phloem
Specialized conducting tissue in vascular plants that transports sucrose from the leaves to other plant organs.
photosynthesis
Process by which energy from sunlight is used to convert carbon dioxide and water into simple sugars in cells containing chloroplasts. All plants, except certain parasites, can perform photosynthesis.
phyllary
Individual bract within an involucre or involucel.
phyllid
Leaf-like extension of the stem in Bryophytes
phyllode

A leaf with the blade much reduced or absent, and in which the petiole and or rachis perform the functions of the whole leaf, e.g. many acacias. Compare cladode.
phyllopodium
(in ferns) A short outgrowth of the stem on which the frond is borne and which remains attached to the rhizome after the frond has been shed.
phylloplane
the surface of a leaf, considered as a habitat for organisms.
phyllosphere
The above-ground surface of plants as a habitat for epiphytic microorganisms.
phylum
A level of classification or taxonomic rank below kingdom and above class. Traditionally, in botany the term division has been used instead of phylum.
phytomelan

A black, inert, organic material that forms a crust-like covering of some seeds, commonly found in Asparagales, Asteraceae, etc.
pileate
Having a cap, a pileus.
pileus
A cap or cap-shaped structure, such as the cap of mushrooms or the plumule of some monocotyledons.
piliform
Having the shape of a cap, a pileus.
pilose
covered with soft, weak, thin and clearly separated hairs, which are usually defined as long and sometimes ascending.
pinna

A primary segment of a compound leaf.
pinnate
A compound leaf with leaflets arranged on each side of a common petiole or axis; also applied to how the lateral veins are arranged in relation to the main vein.
pinnatifid
Pinnately lobed.
pinnatisect
pinnately divided almost to midrib but segments still confluent.
pinnule or pinnula
Usage varies:
ultimate free division (or leaflets) of a compound leaf,
or
a pinnate subdivision of a multipinnate leaf.
pistil
1. a single carpel when the carpels are free.
2. a group of carpels when the carpels are united by the fusion of their walls.
pistillate flower
a flower containing one or more pistils but no fertile stamens. Sometimes called a female flower. Contrast with staminate flower
pistillode
A sterile or rudimentary pistil such as may appear in a staminate flower.
pit
In tracheary elements, a section of the cell wall where the secondary wall is missing, and the primary wall is present. Pits generally occur in pairs and link two cells.
pith
The central region of a stem, inside the vascular cylinder; the spongy parenchymatous central tissue in some stems and roots.
placenta
The tissue within an ovary to which the ovules are attached.
placentation
The arrangement of ovules inside ovary; for example axile, free-central, parietal, marginal, basal, or apical.
Plant Breeders Rights (PBR)
These rights, governed by Plant Breeder's Rights Acts give the plant breeder legal protection over the propagation of a cultivar, and the exclusive rights to produce and to sell it, including the right to license others to produce and sell plants and reproductive material of a registered, deliberately bred variety. Compare UPOV.
Plant Variety Rights (PVR)
Governed by the Plant Variety Rights the registration of new varieties is now governed by Plant Breeders Rights.
plastochron
The time between successive leaf initiation events.
pleiochasium
pl. pleiochasia. An inflorescence in which several buds come out at the same time. Compare monochasium and dichasium.
plicate
Pleated; folded back and forth longitudinally like a fan, such as the leaves of fan palm species. The concept often appears in specific names in forms such as Kumara plicatilis and Acacia plicata. Commonly such names are not correctly appropriate, but are applied to distichous structures rather than plicate.
-plinerved
(of leaves) A suffix indicating that the main nerves are lateral and arise from a point distinctly above the base of the leaf. Combined with a numerical prefix to form words like 3-plinerved, 5-plinerved, and so on. Such leaves are especially characteristic of the family Melastomataceae. See for example Dissotis.
plumose
Like a feather; with fine hairs branching from a main axis.
plumule
The part of an embryo that gives rise to the shoot system of a plant. Compare radicle.
pluriflor
Having many flowers per inflorescence. See also pauciflor and uniflor.
pluriovulate
Having many ovules as in placentae, carpels, or ovaries.
pneumatophore
A vertical appendage, aerial at low tide, on the roots of some plants. Pneumatophore functions are unclear, but possibly related to gas exchange, or to root anchoring. Pneumatophores typically occur on mangrove roots, but some versions occur on species of conifers, such as some in the Taxodioideae.
pod
1. A legume, the fruit of a leguminous plant, a dry fruit of a single carpel, splitting along two sutures.
2. A siliqua and silicula, the fruit of Brassicaceae, a dry fruit composed of two carpels separated by a partition.
podocarpium
In four genera of the coniferous family Podocarpaceae (Acmopyle, Dacrycarpus, Falcatifolium, and Podocarpus), a group of fleshy fused bracts beneath the female cone, often brightly-colored, which swell to enclose the developing seeds above and attract fruit-eating animals.
pollen
pollen-grains, the microspores of seed plants from anthers of angiosperms or the microsporangia (of gymnosperms); .
pollen-mass
Sometimes = pollinium, but more loosely, any mass of pollen a plant produces, such as around the spadix and within the spathe of some Araceae.
pollen transmitting tissue
the tissue in the style of a flower through which the pollen tubes grow.
pollinarium
See pollinium. Variously applied to structures of two or more pollinia connected or joined together. Pollinaria occur in various plant taxa, notably Orchidaceae and Asclepiadoideae
pollination
The transfer of pollen from a male organ (such as an anther) to the receptive region of a female organ (such as a stigma).
pollinium
A structure of coherent pollen-grains from a single anther; pollinia commonly occur in e.g. orchids and Asclepiadoideae as woolly, sticky or waxy masses, adapted to being stuck to appropriate pollinators and carried away to another flower of the same species. Such flowers typically are adapted to stripping incoming pollinia from carrier insects, thereby avoiding pollen from unrelated species.
polygamodioecious
Having bisexual and male flowers on some plants and bisexual and female flowers on others. Compare androdioecious, andromonoecious, dioecious, monoecious, polygamomonoecious, and polygamous.
polygamomonoecious
having male, female, and bisexual flowers on the same plant. Compare androdioecious, andromonoecious, polygamodioecious, and polygamous.
polygamous
having bisexual and unisexual flowers on the same plant.
polymorphic
Of several different kinds (in respect to shape and/or size), hence polymorphism. See also monomorphic (a single type) and dimorphic (two types)
polyphyllous
having many leaves or perianth segments. Compare symphyllous, gamophyllous, and apophyllous.
polyploid
with more than two of the basic sets of chromosomes in the nucleus; any sporophyte with cells containing three or more complete sets of chromosomes. Various combinations of words or numbers with '-ploid' indicate the number of haploid sets of chromosomes, e.g. triploid = 3 sets, tetraploid = 4 sets, pentaploid = 5 sets, hexaploid = 6 sets, and so on.
polystemonous
having numerous stamens; the number of stamens being at least twice the number of sepals or petals, but not strictly three or four times that number.
pome
A fruit that has developed partly from the ovary wall but mostly from the hypanthium (e.g. an apple).
population
1. All individuals of one or more species within a prescribed area.
2. A group of organisms of one species, occupying a defined area and usually isolated to some degree from other similar groups.
3. In statistics, the whole group of items or individuals under investigation.
poricidal
Opening by pores, as with the capsule of a poppy or the anthers in several families of plants. Compare longicidal.
posterior
Positioned behind or toward the rear. Contrast anterior.
prickle

A hard, pointed outgrowth from the surface of a plant (involving several layers of cells but not containing a vein); a sharp outgrowth from the bark, detachable without tearing wood. Compare thorn.
primary vein
The single vein or array of veins that is conspicuously larger than any others in a leaf. In pinnate venation, the single primary vein can generally be found in the middle of the leaf; in palmate venation, several such veins radiate from a point at or near the base of the leaf.
procumbent
Spreading along the ground but not rooting at the nodes; not as close to the ground as prostrate.
propagule
Any structure capable of generating a new plant; includes seeds, spores, bulbils, etc.
pro parte
In part. In nomenclature, used to denote that the preceding taxon includes more than one currently recognized entity, and that only one of those entities is being considered.
prophyll
A leaf formed at the base of a shoot, usually smaller than those formed later.
prostrate
Lying flat on the ground; commonly rooting at nodes that touch the soil surface.
protandrous
Having male sex organs which mature before the female ones, e.g. a flower shedding pollen before the stigma is receptive. Compare protogynous.
proteranthous
With new leaves appearing before flowers. See also hysteranthous and synanthous.
prothallus
A gametophyte plant, usually flattened and delicate, e.g. in ferns and fern allies.
protogynous
Having female sex organs which mature before the male ones, e.g. a flower shedding pollen after the stigma has ceased to be receptive. Compare protandrous.
proximal
Near the point of origin or attachment. Compare distal.
pruinose
Covered with a powdery, waxy material; having a bloom.
pseudanthium
A type of inflorescence occurring in the Asteraceae and Euphorbiaceae, in which multiple flowers are grouped together to form a flower-like structure, commonly called a head or capitulum.
pseudo-
A prefix meaning "false, not genuine", e.g. a pseudo-bulb is a thickened, bulb-like internode in orchids, but not an actual bulb.
pseudobasifixed
(of an anther) Connected to the filament of the stamen by connective tissue which extends in a tube around the filament tip. See also basifixed and dorsifixed.
pseudostipule
An enlarged, persistent axillary bud scale that resembles a stipule; common in Bignoniaceae.
pseudoverticillate
Having the appearance of being whorled (verticillate), without actually being so.
puberulous

Covered with minute soft erect hairs.
pubescent
Downy; covered with short, soft hairs, especially erect hairs.
pulverulent
Having powdery or crumbly particles as if pulverized.
pulvinate
Having a pulvinus.
pulvinus
a swelling at either end of a petiole of a leaf or petiolule of a leaflet, e.g. in Fabaceae, that permits leaf movement.
punctate
(from Latin puncta= puncture or prick-mark) marked with an indefinite number of dots, or with similarly small items such as translucent glands or tiny hollows.
punctiform
Dot-like or in the shape of a prick-mark.
pungent
Having a sharp, hard point.
pustule
A blister-like swelling.
pustulate
Having pustules.
pyramidal
(of a growth habit) Shaped like an Egyptian pyramid, broad conic with a quadrate cross-section. Not found in nature, in living things only seen in deliberately shaped topiary, but the term is frequently misapplied to conical trees, especially in popular literature.
pyrene
The stone of a drupe, consisting of the seed surrounded by the hardened endocarp.
pyriform
Pear-shaped; a term for solid shapes that are roughly conical in shape, broadest one end and narrowest at the other. As a rule the distal third of their length is the broadest, and they are narrowest near the proximal end, the base, where the stalk, if any, attaches.
pyrophile
Plants which need fire for their reproduction.
pyrophyte
Plants which have adapted to tolerate fire.
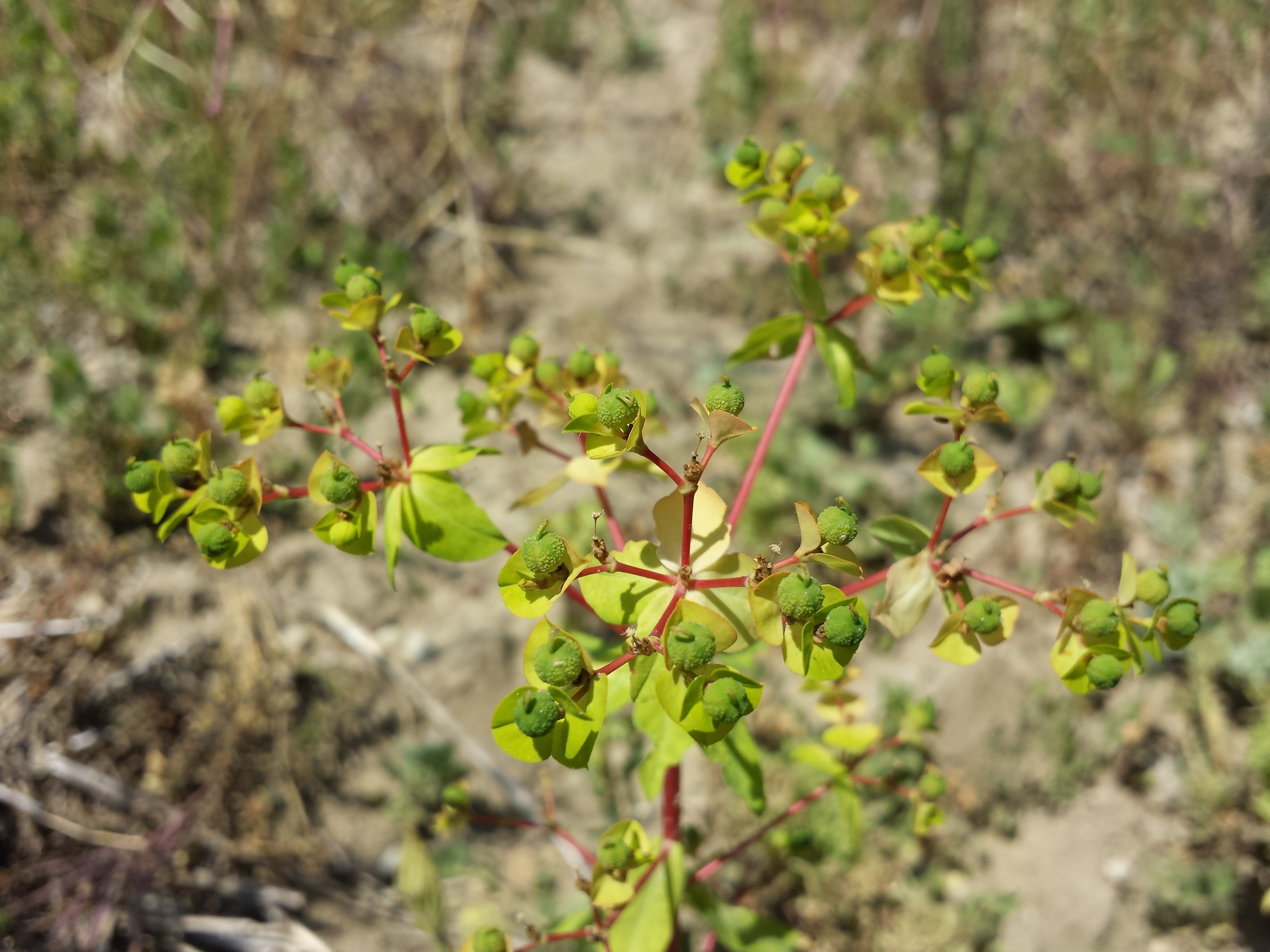
Flowers in the inflorescence of Euphorbia platyphyllos open simultaneously, as a pleiochasium.

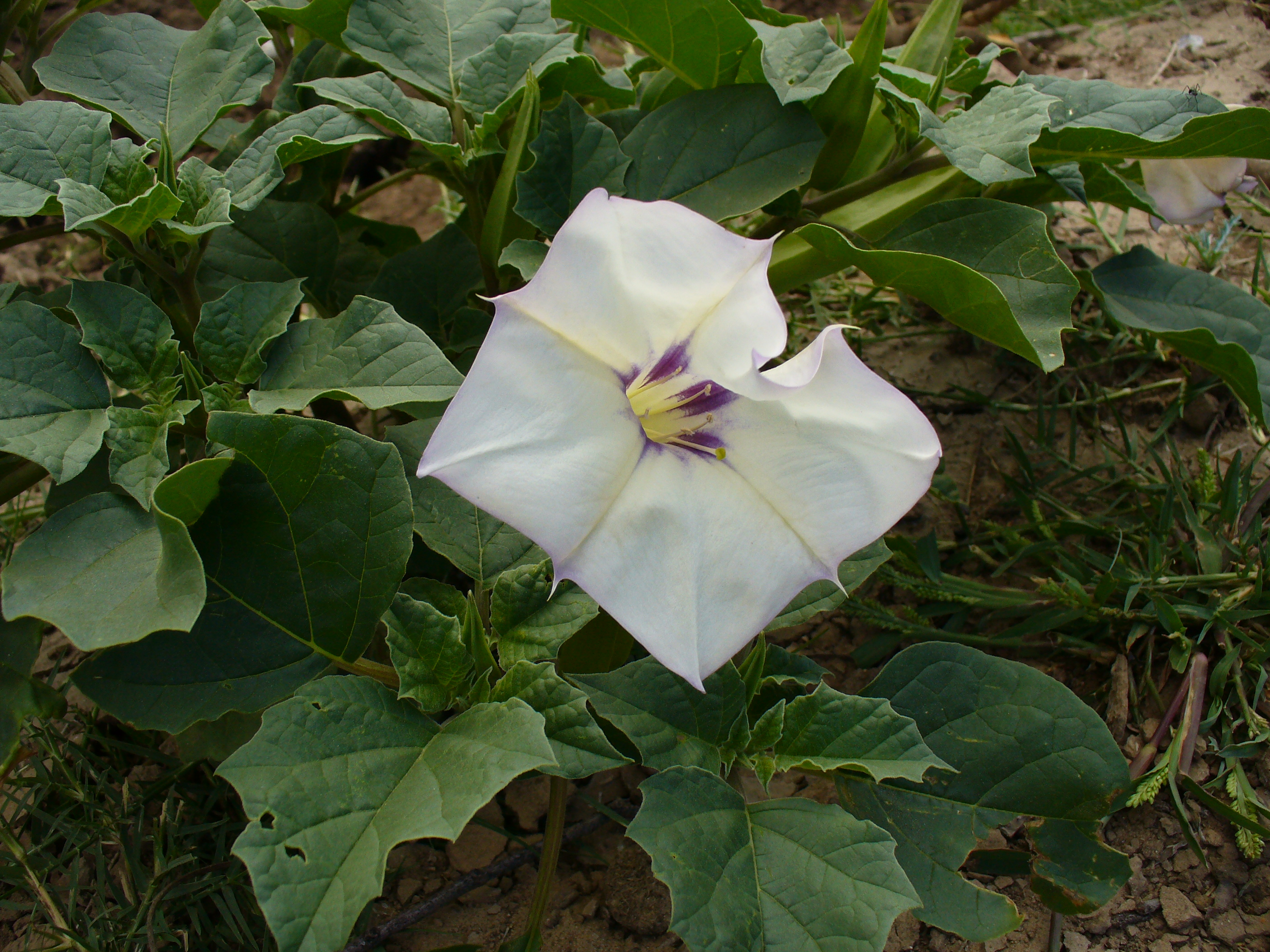
The corolla of Datura discolor is plicate.

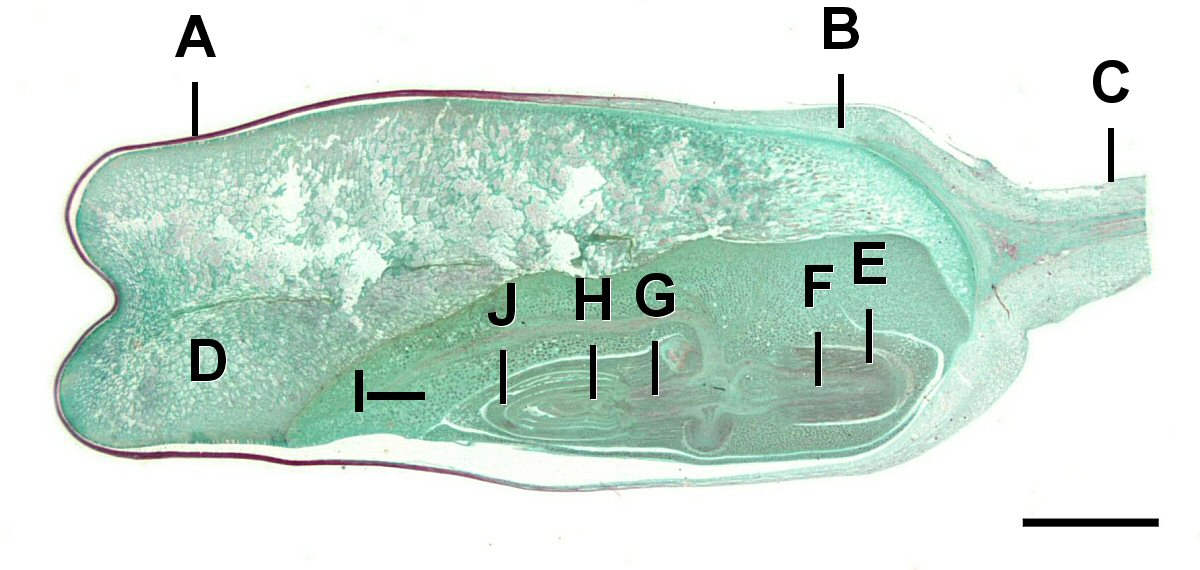
Longitudinal section of maize kernel (scale=1.4 mm):
A=pericarp, B=aleurone, C=stalk, D=endosperm, E=coleorhiza, F=radicle, G=hypocotyl, H=plumule, I=scutellum, J=coleoptile

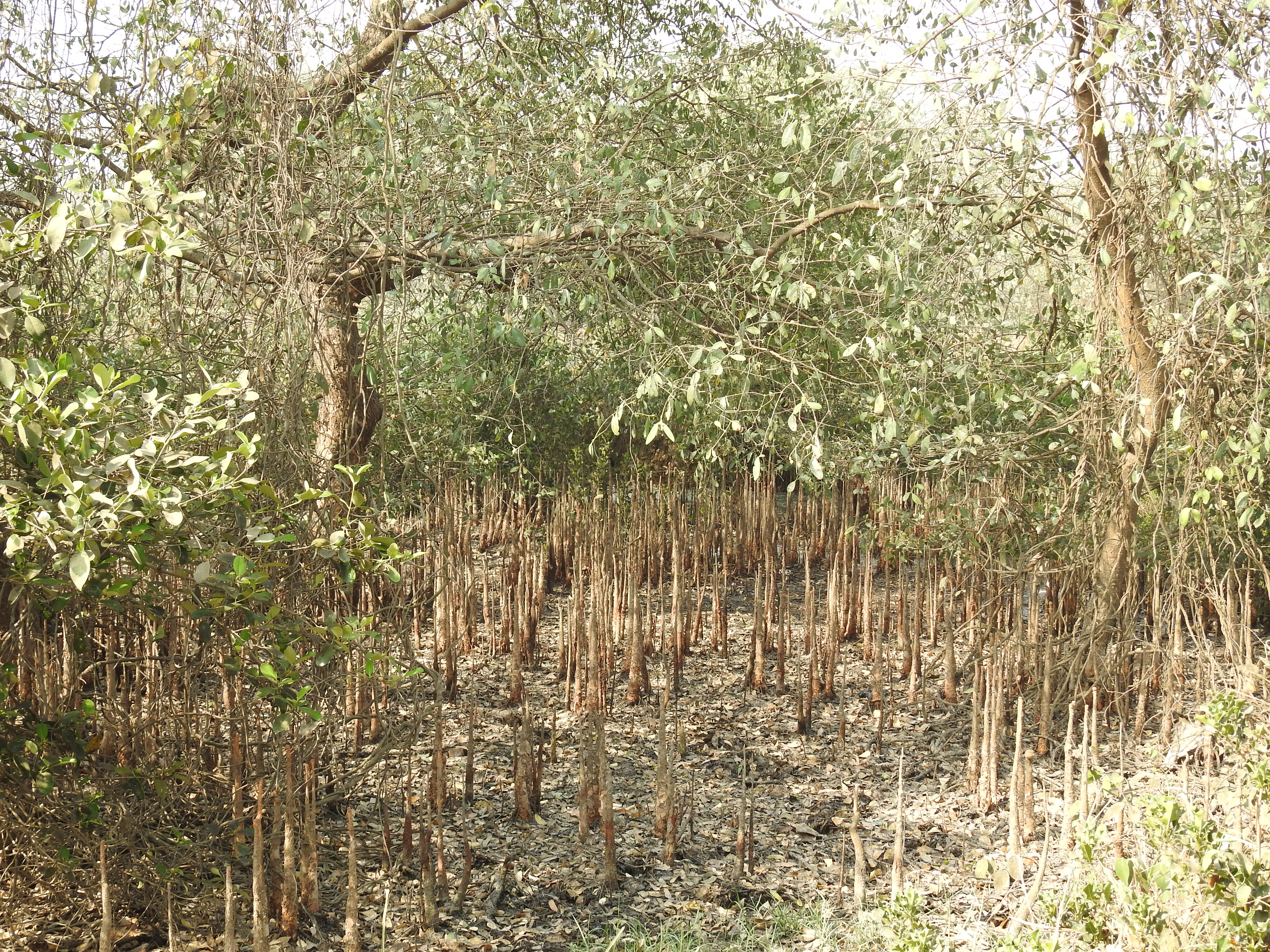
Pneumatophores on a species of mangrove

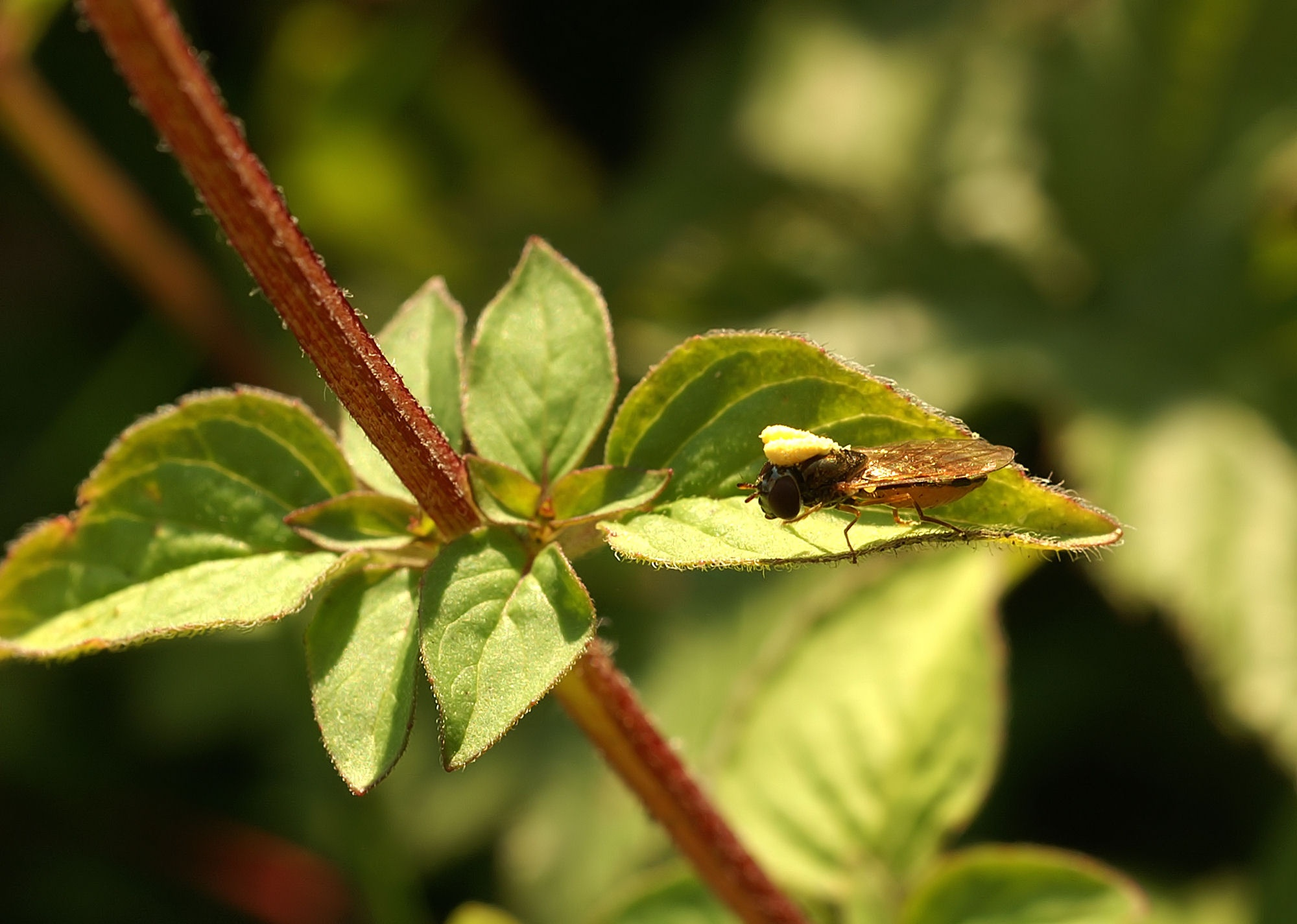
Pollinium of an orchid, stuck to a syrphid fly that visited one flower, and may yet deposit its burden onto another flower of the same species.

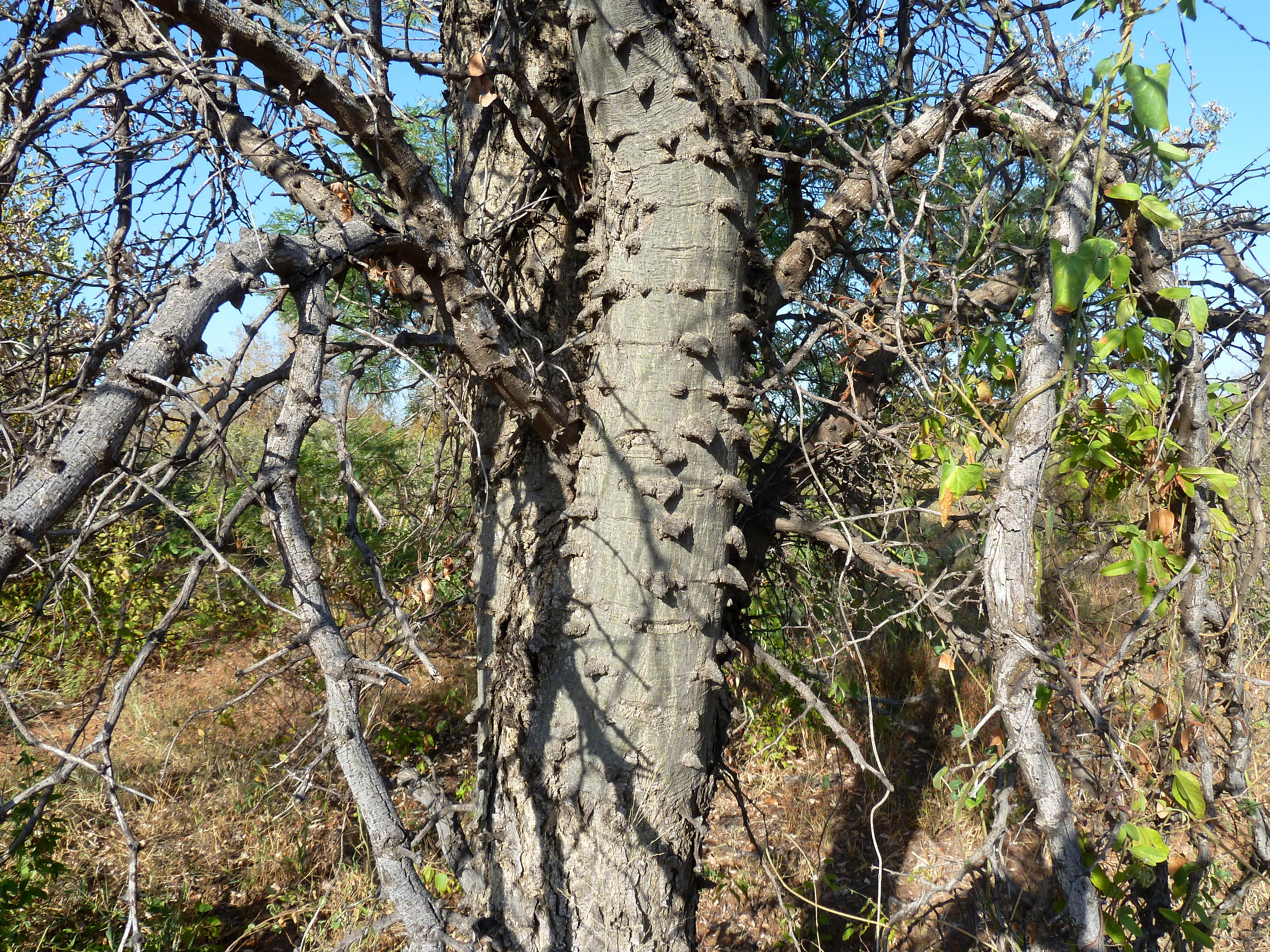
The sharp projections on the trunk of the knobthorn, Senegalia nigrescens, are prickles rather than thorns, botanically speaking.

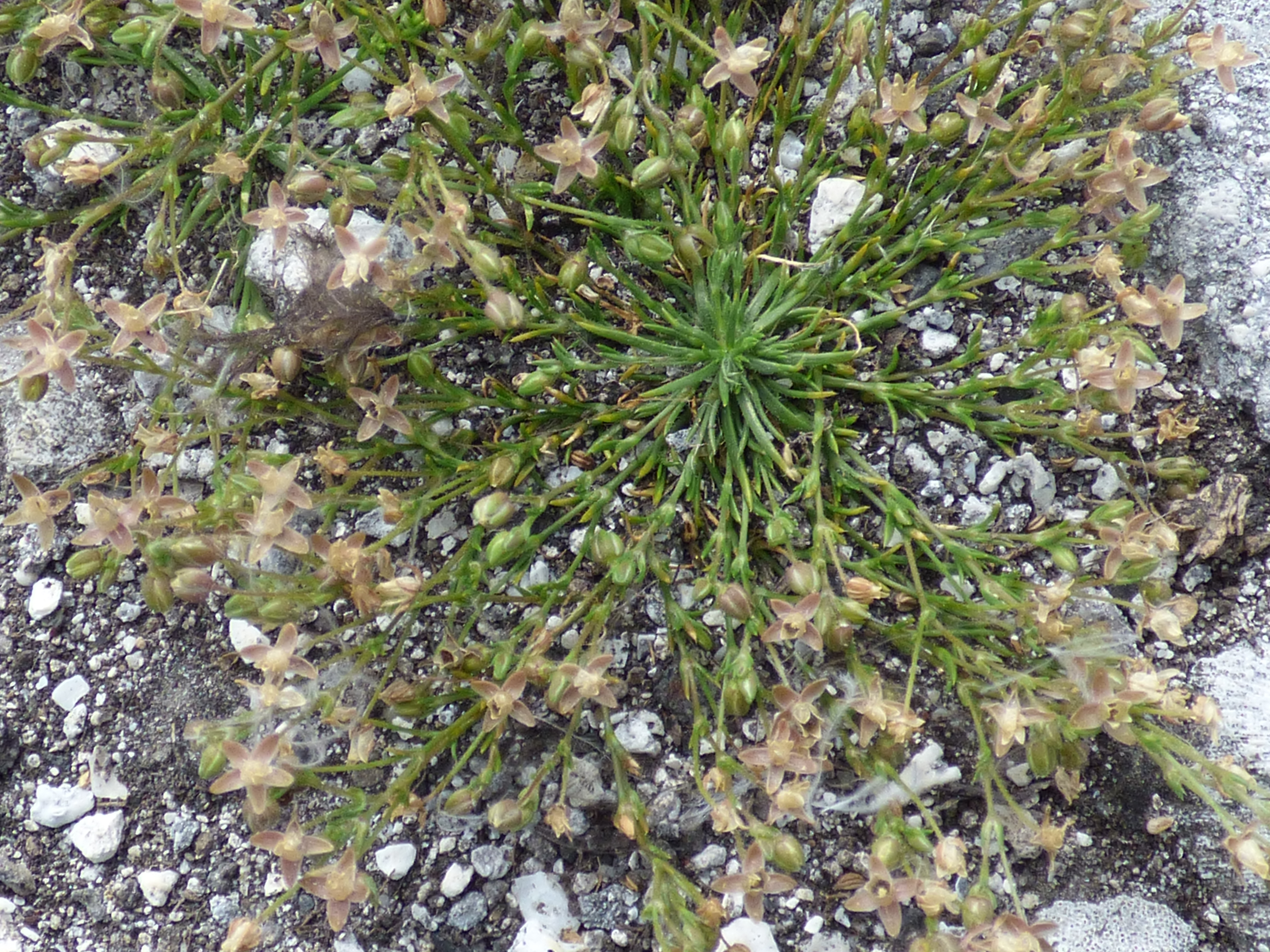
Procumbent growth habit of Sagina procumbens, growing mainly along the soil surface, but without rooting

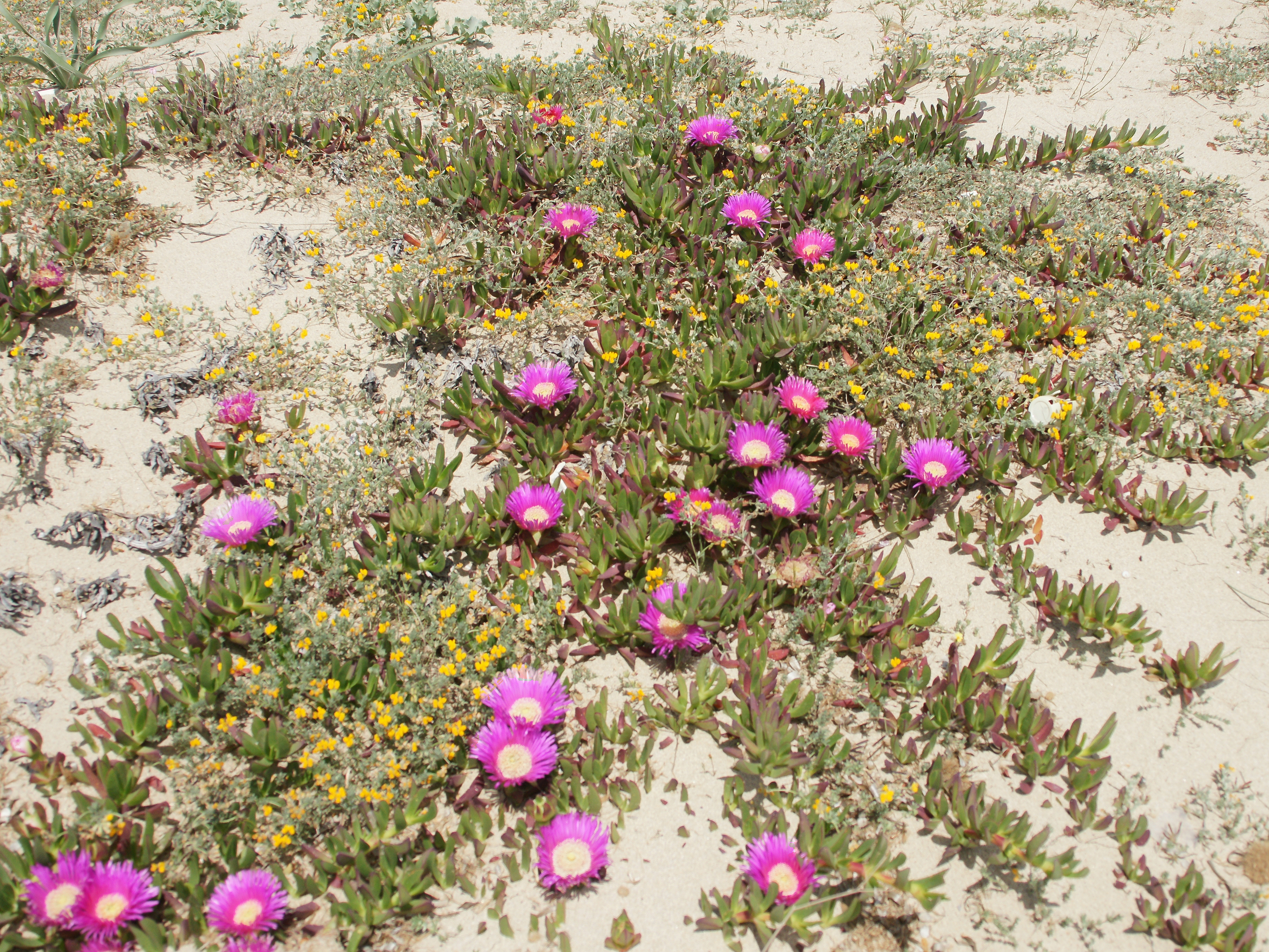
Carpobrotus and other prostrate plants growing on sand in Sicily, striking root and binding the soil as they grow

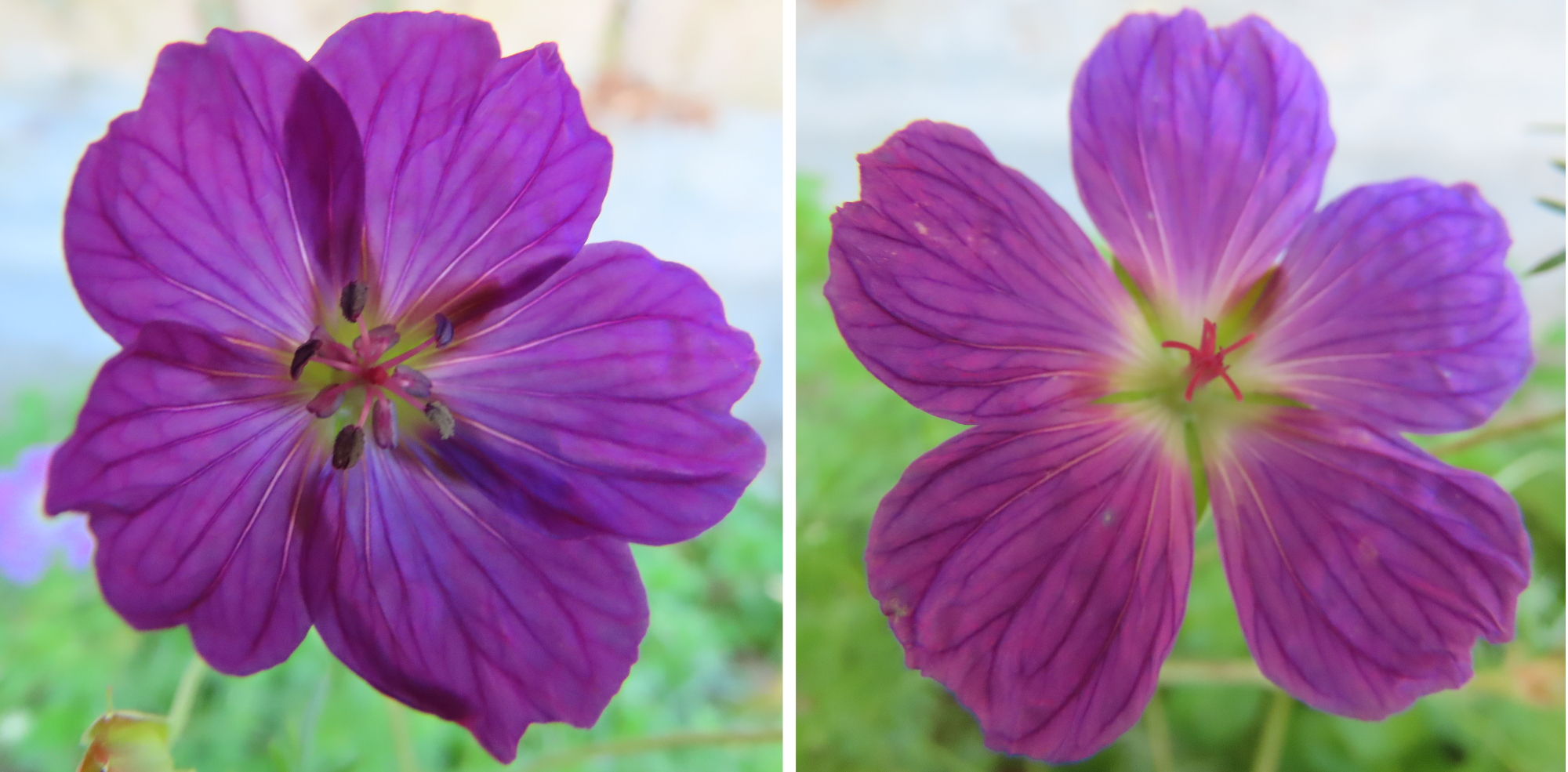
Floral stages of the protandrous species: Geranium incanum. The flower at first has intensely colored petals, and both androecium and gynoecium. After a day or so in bloom, it sheds the stamens and the color of the petals becomes somewhat paler.

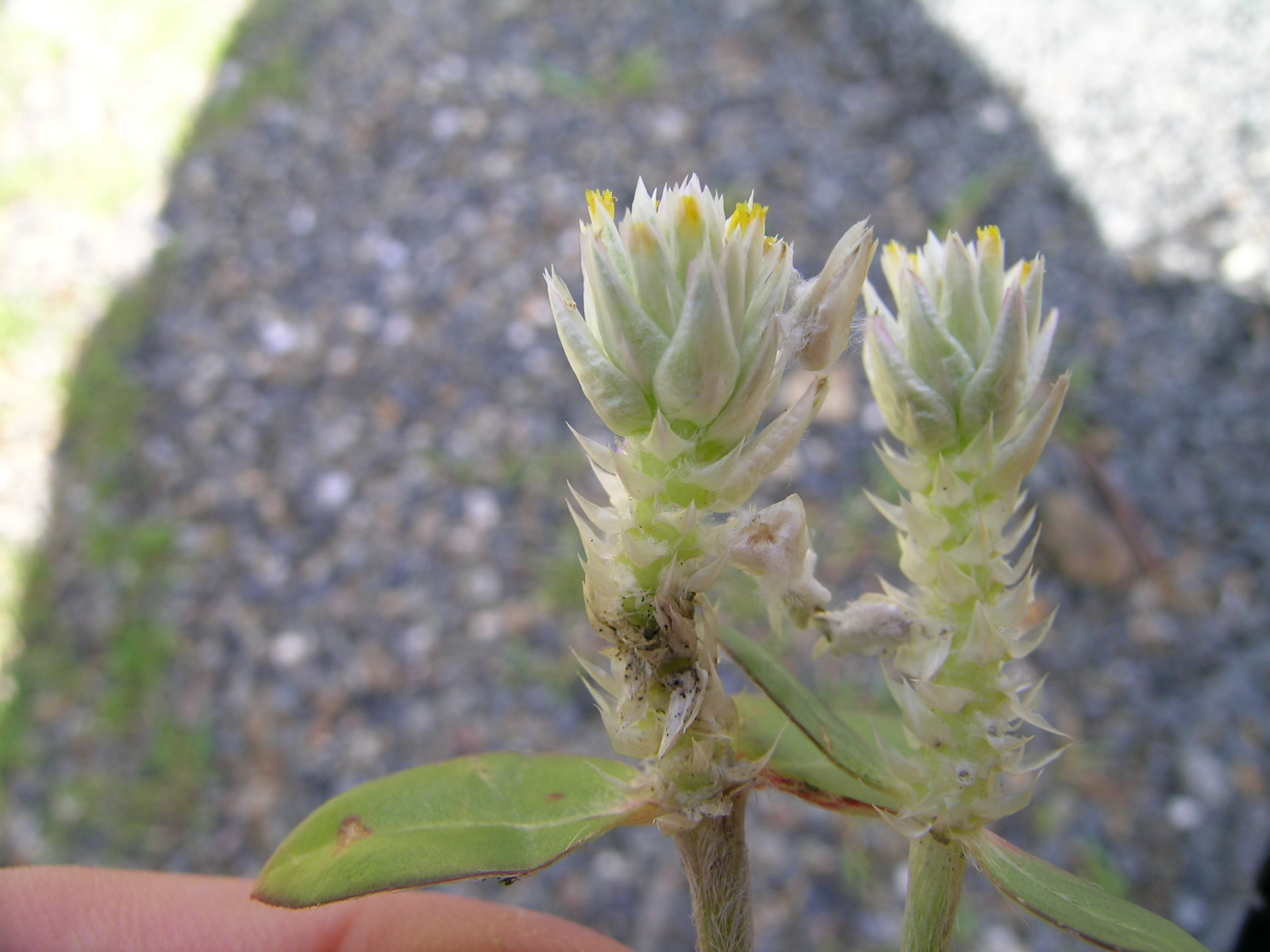
Pubescent stem and inflorescence of Gomphrena celosioides

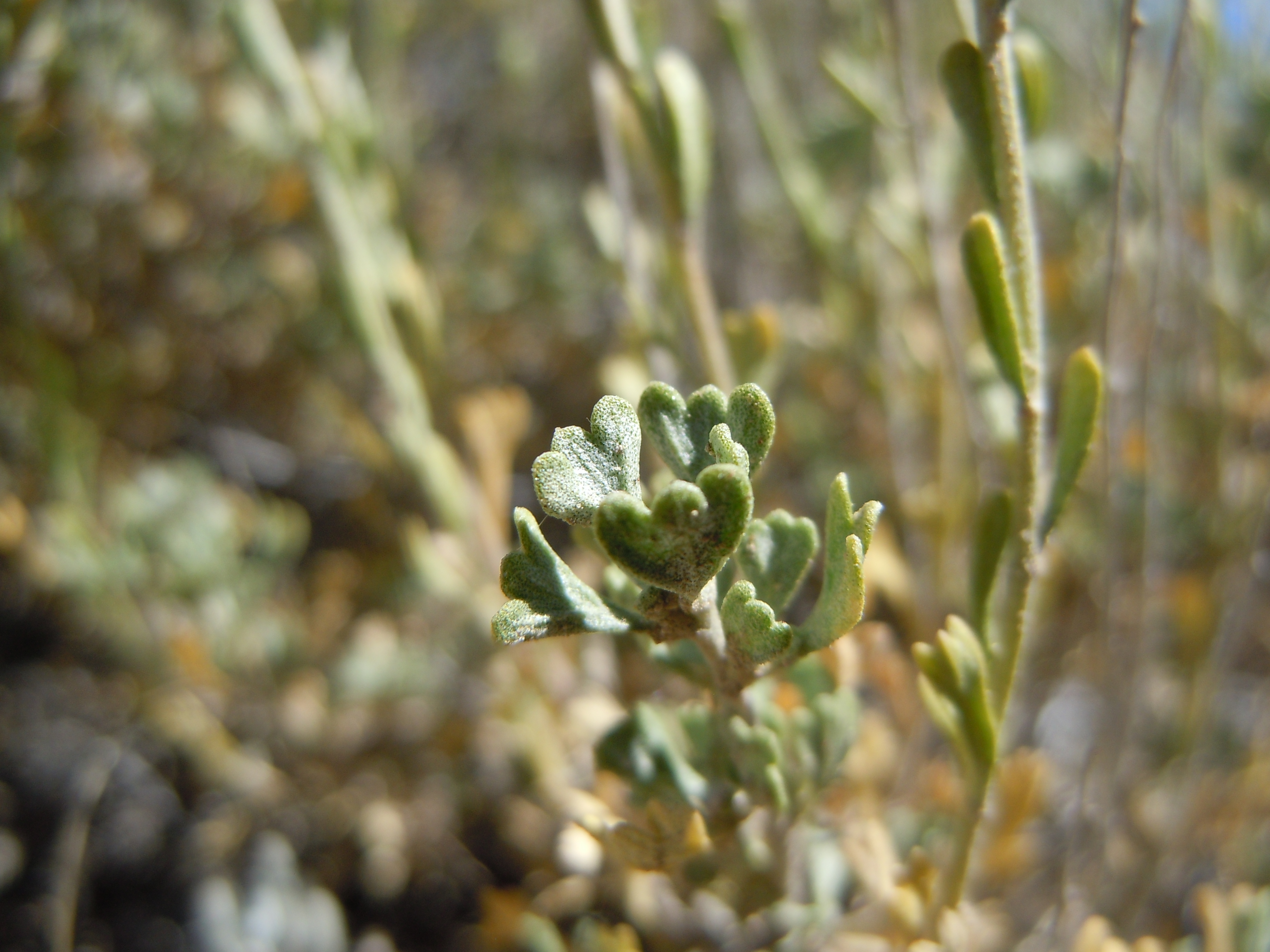
Punctate glands on Artemisia nova are visible because they are not covered with epidermal hairs.

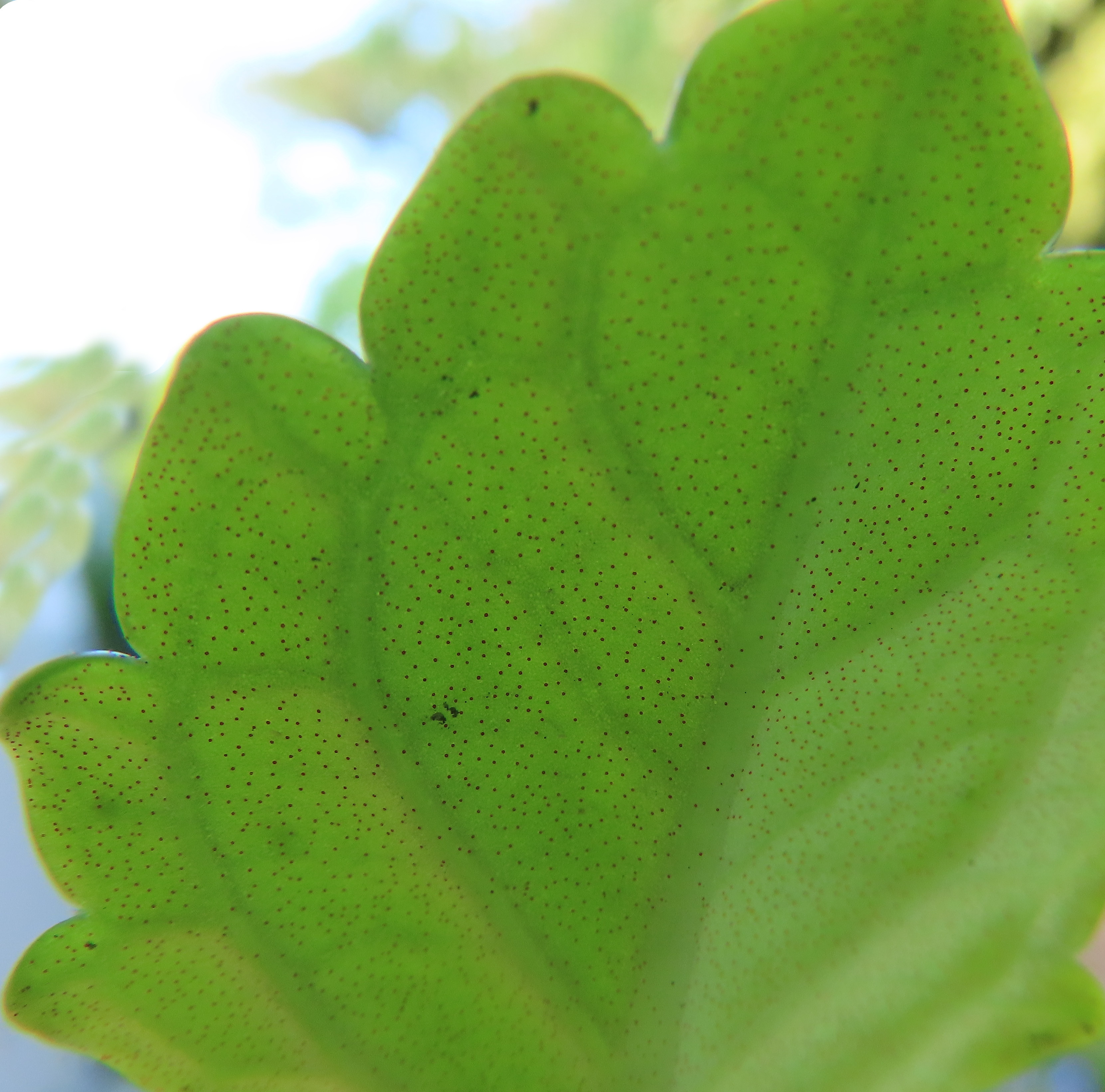
Punctiform glands on the undersurface of a Plectranthus leaf

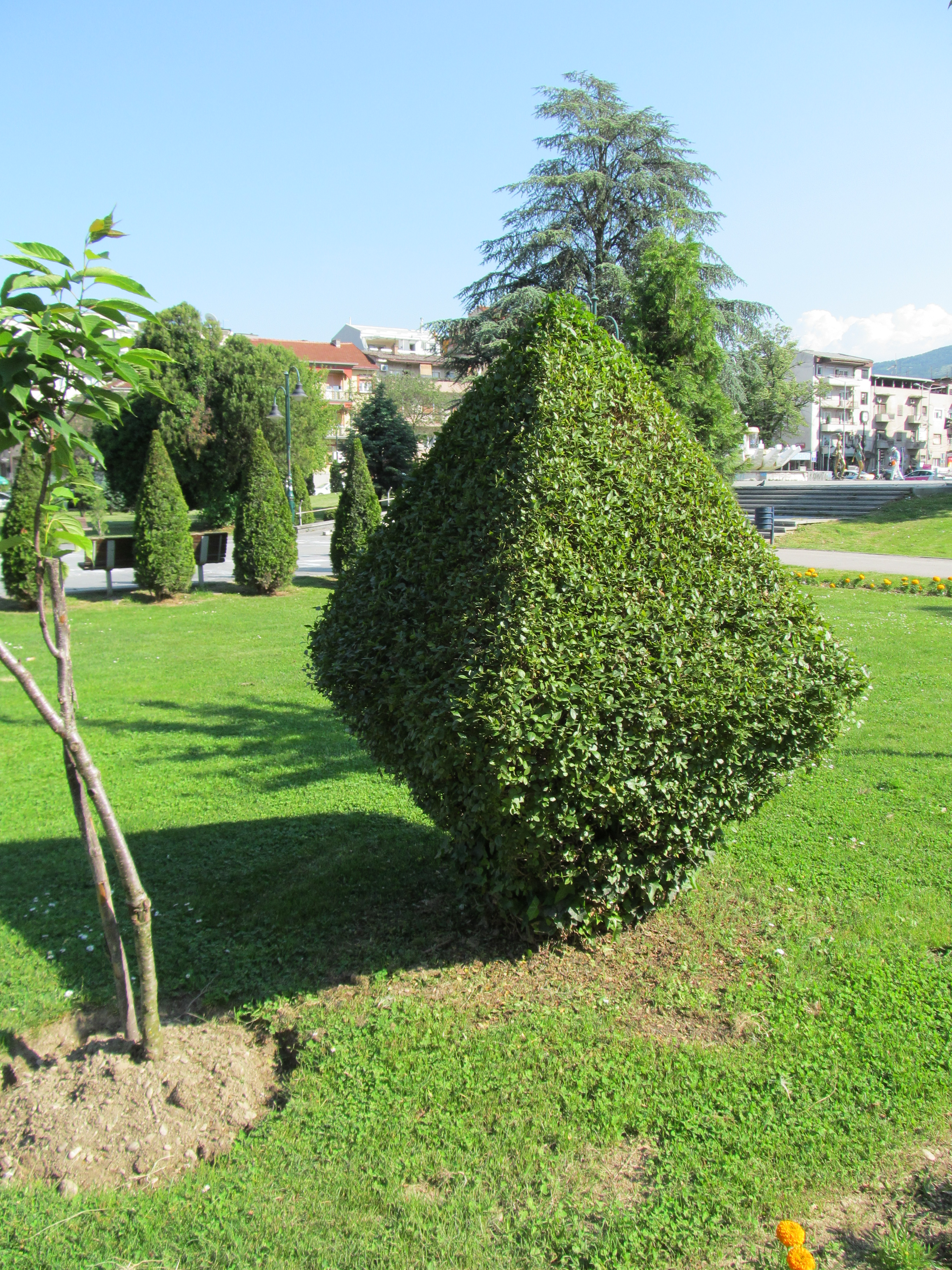
Pyramidal shape on a topiary specimen

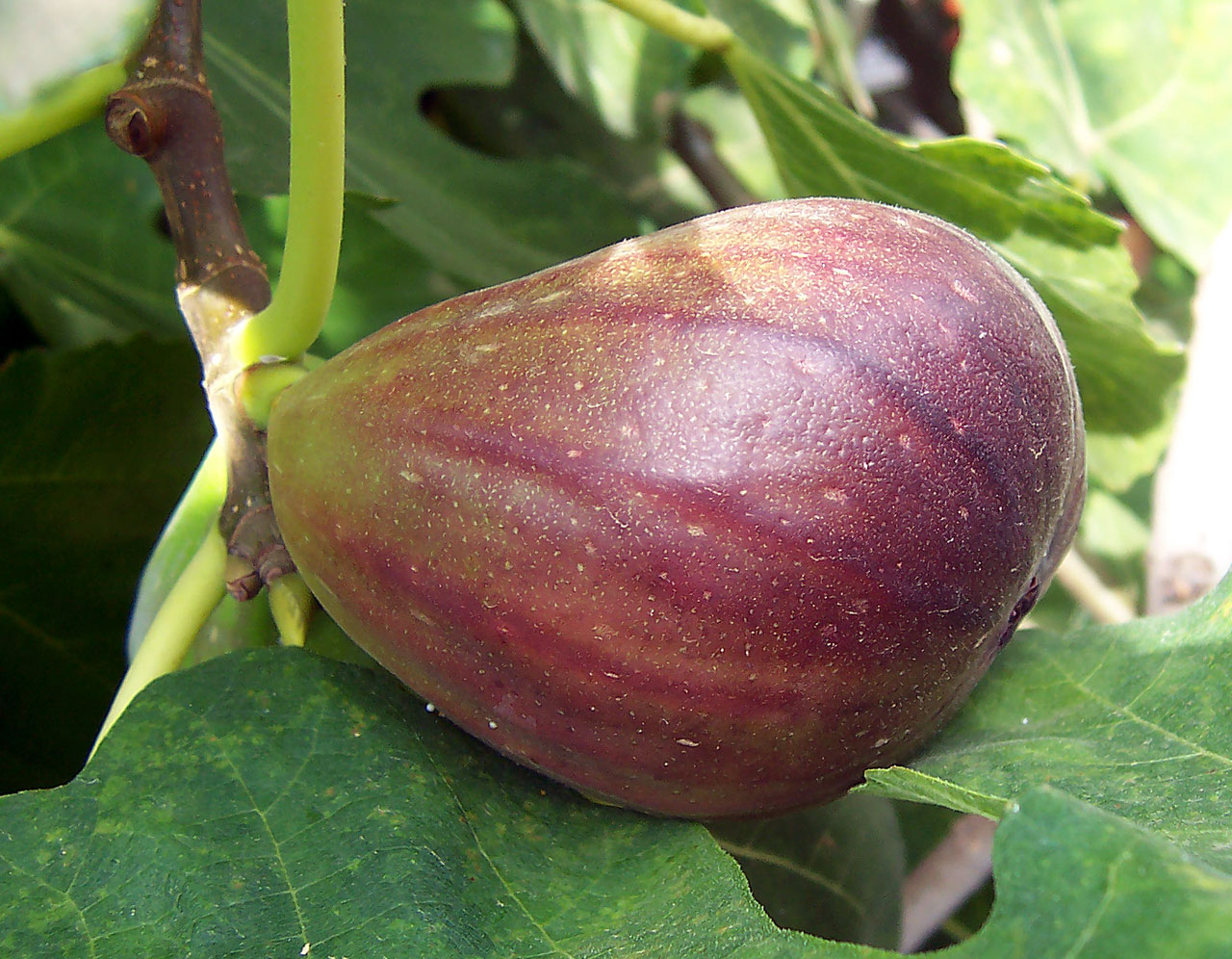
Pyriform syconium ("fruit") of domestic fig

== Q ==
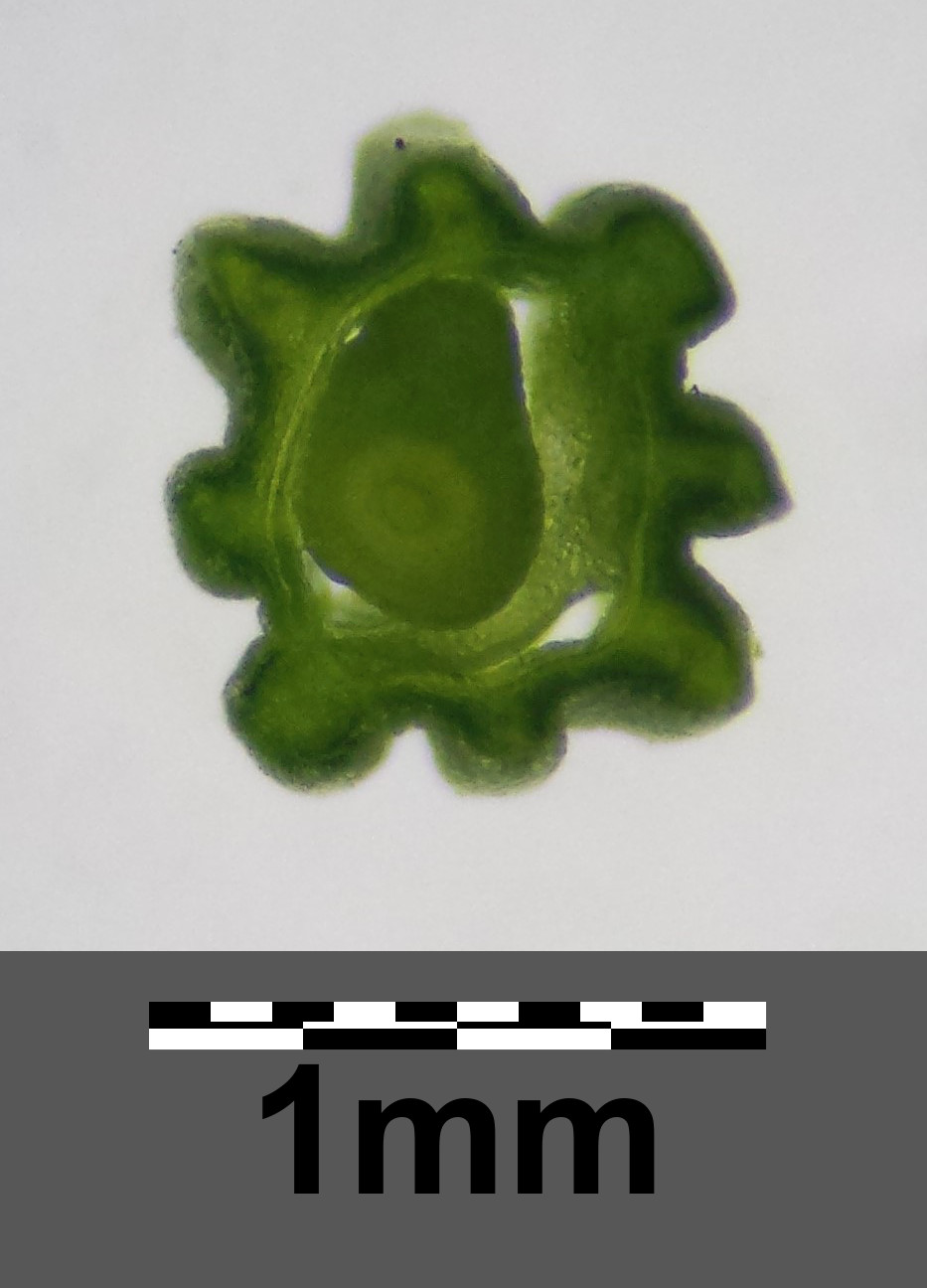
Siliques of Conringia orientalis tend toward a quadrate cross section.

quadrate
More or less square.

== R ==
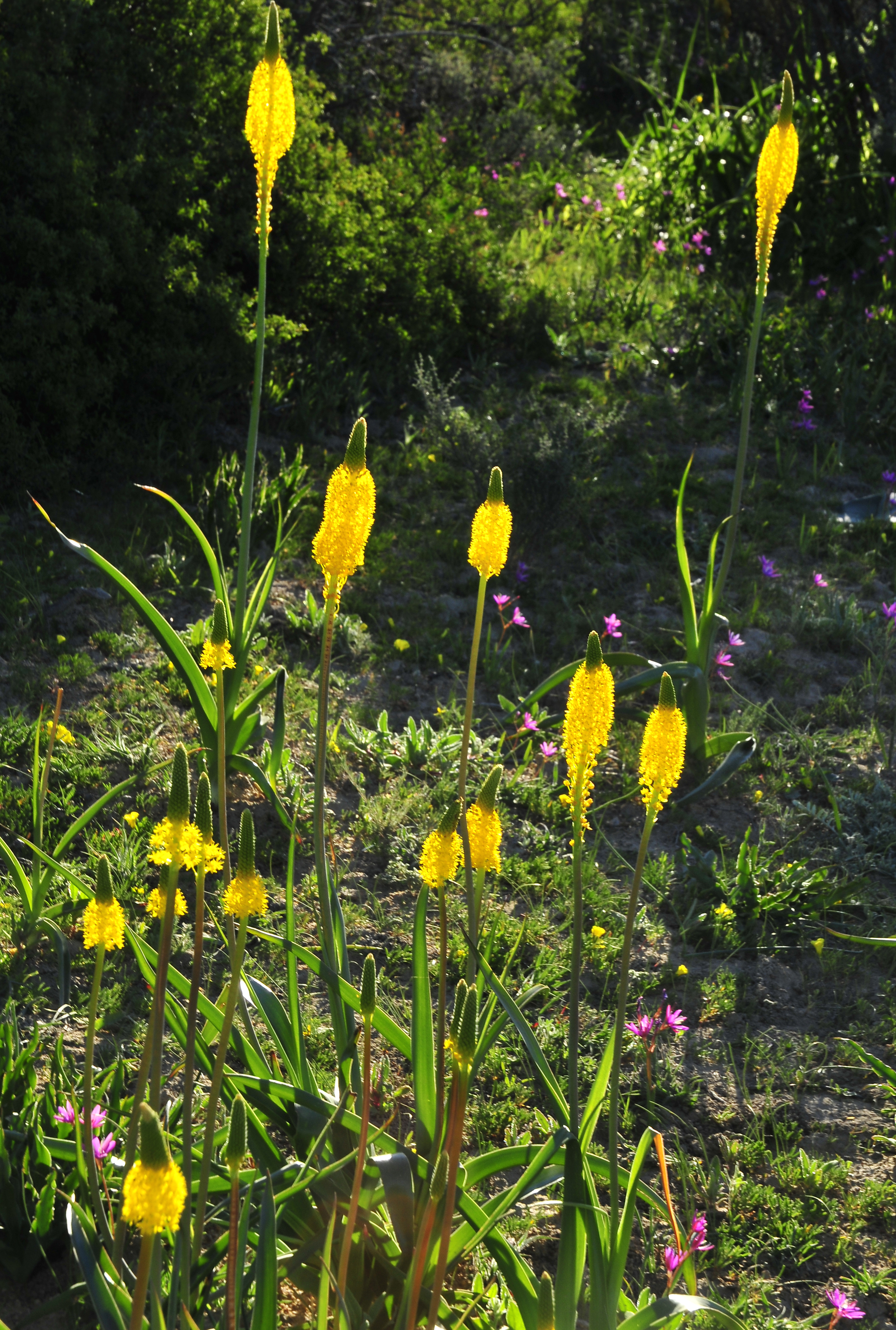
Bulbinella latifolia racemes. The flowers are already open at the bottom; at the top, the axis is still growing and budding.

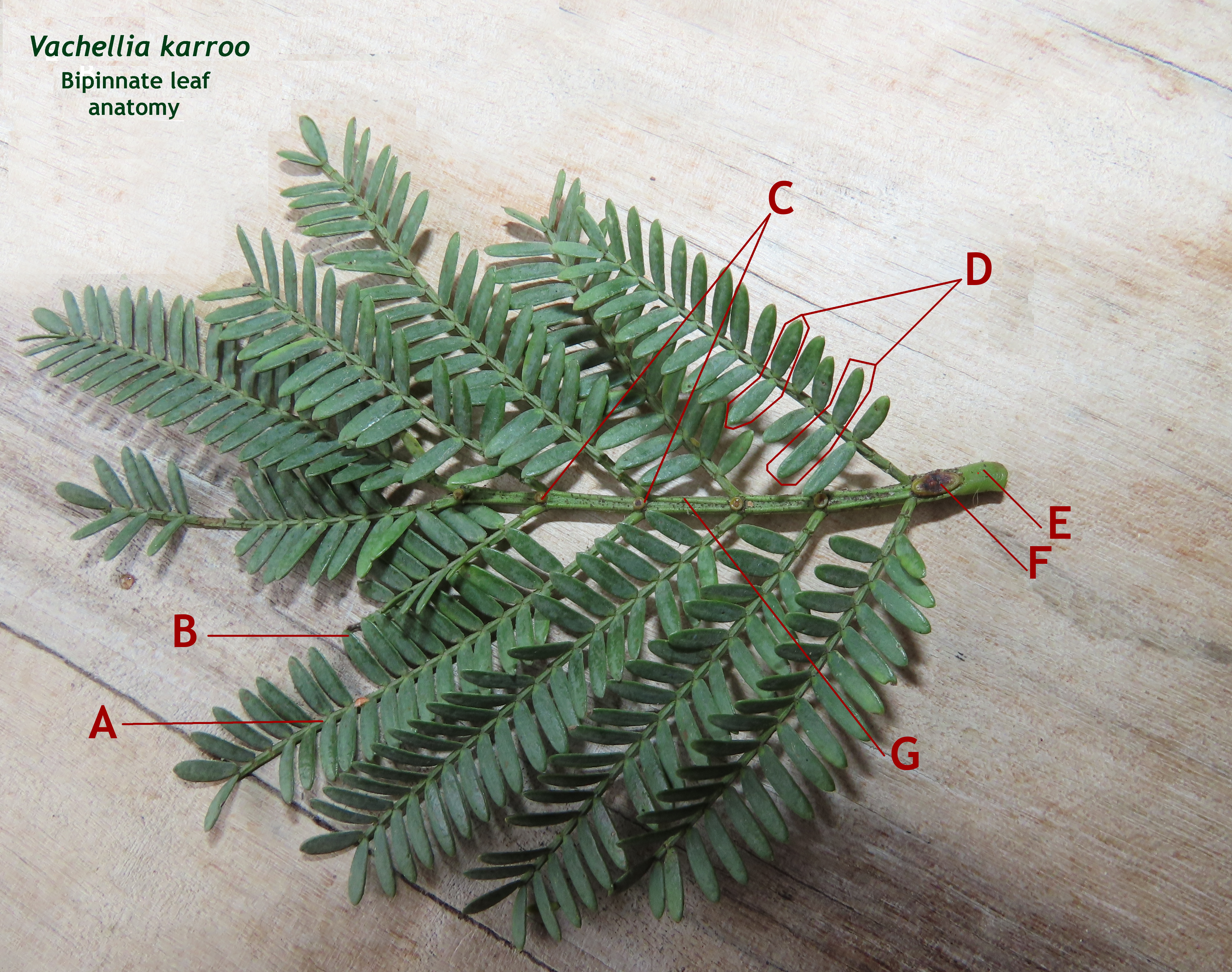
Rachis of Vachellia karroo bipinnate leaf, with components labelled as follows: A. Rachilla (the diminutive of rachis) B. Pinnule C. Jugary glands D. Juga (plural of jugum) E. Base of petiole F. Petiolary gland G. Rachis

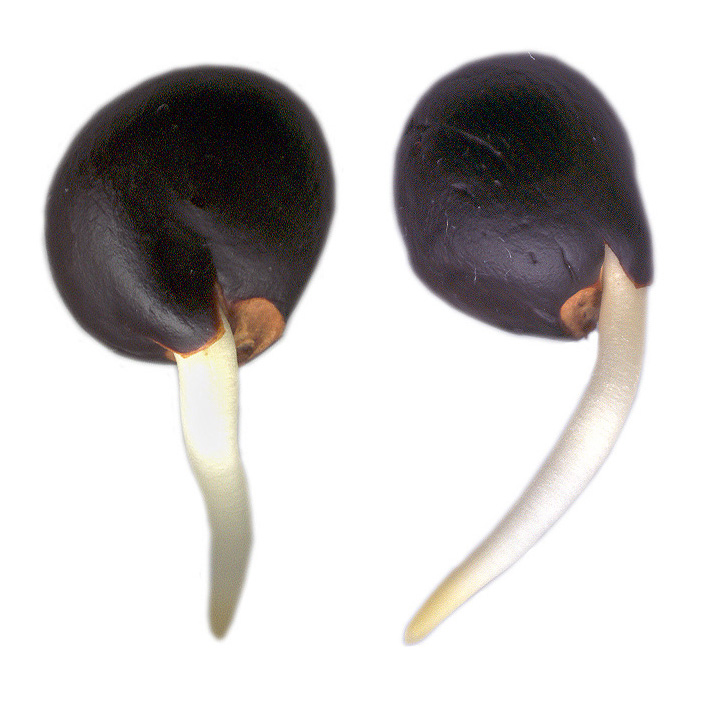
Radicles emerging from germinating seeds

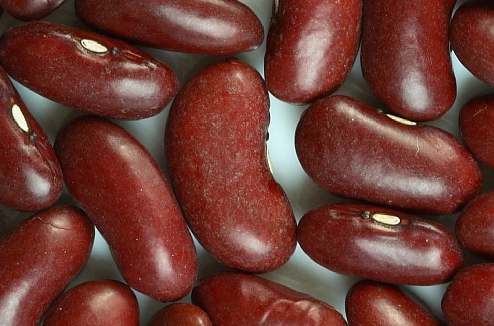
Reniform kidney bean seeds

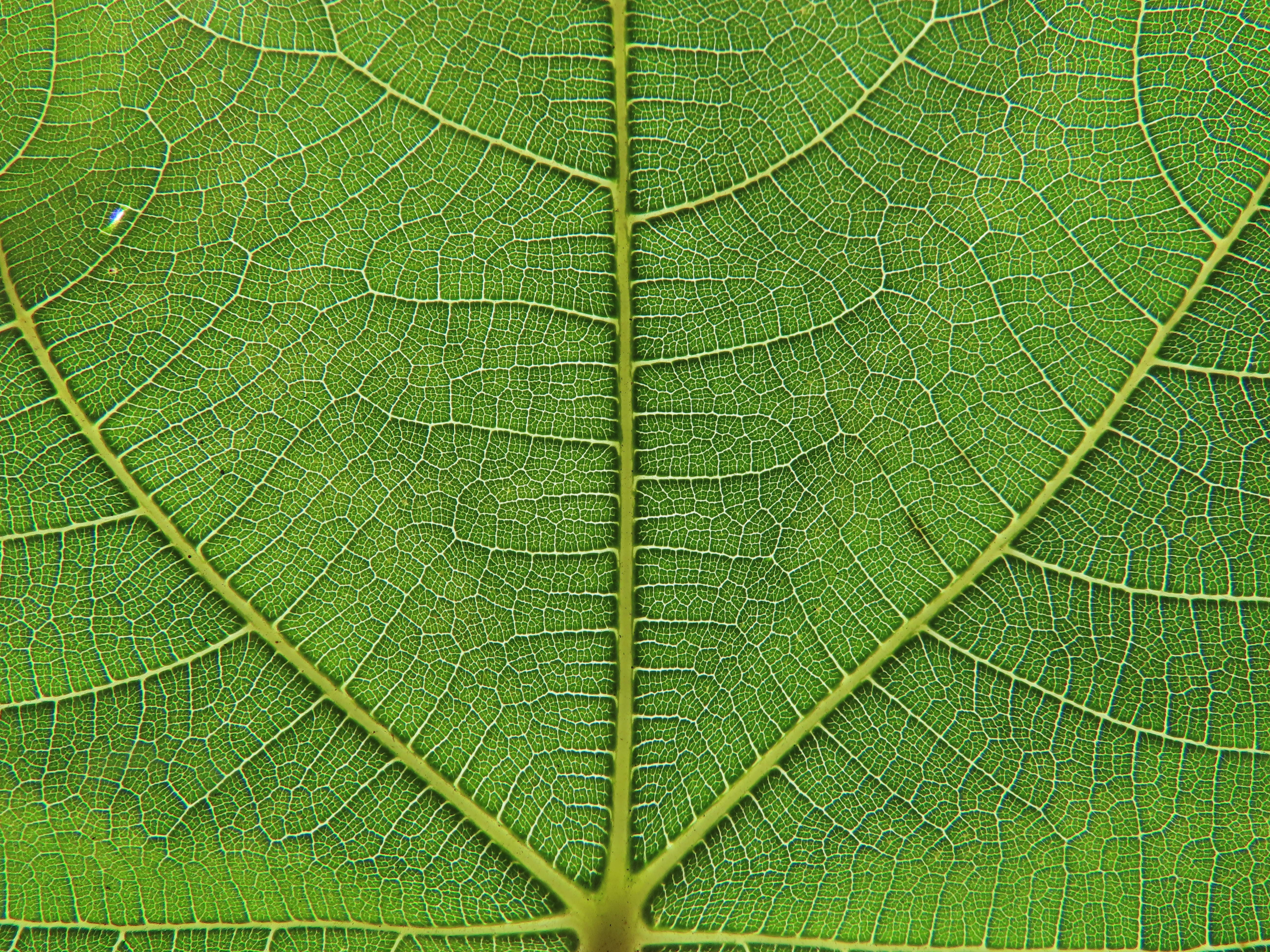
A leaf of Ficus carica, illustrating reticulate venation

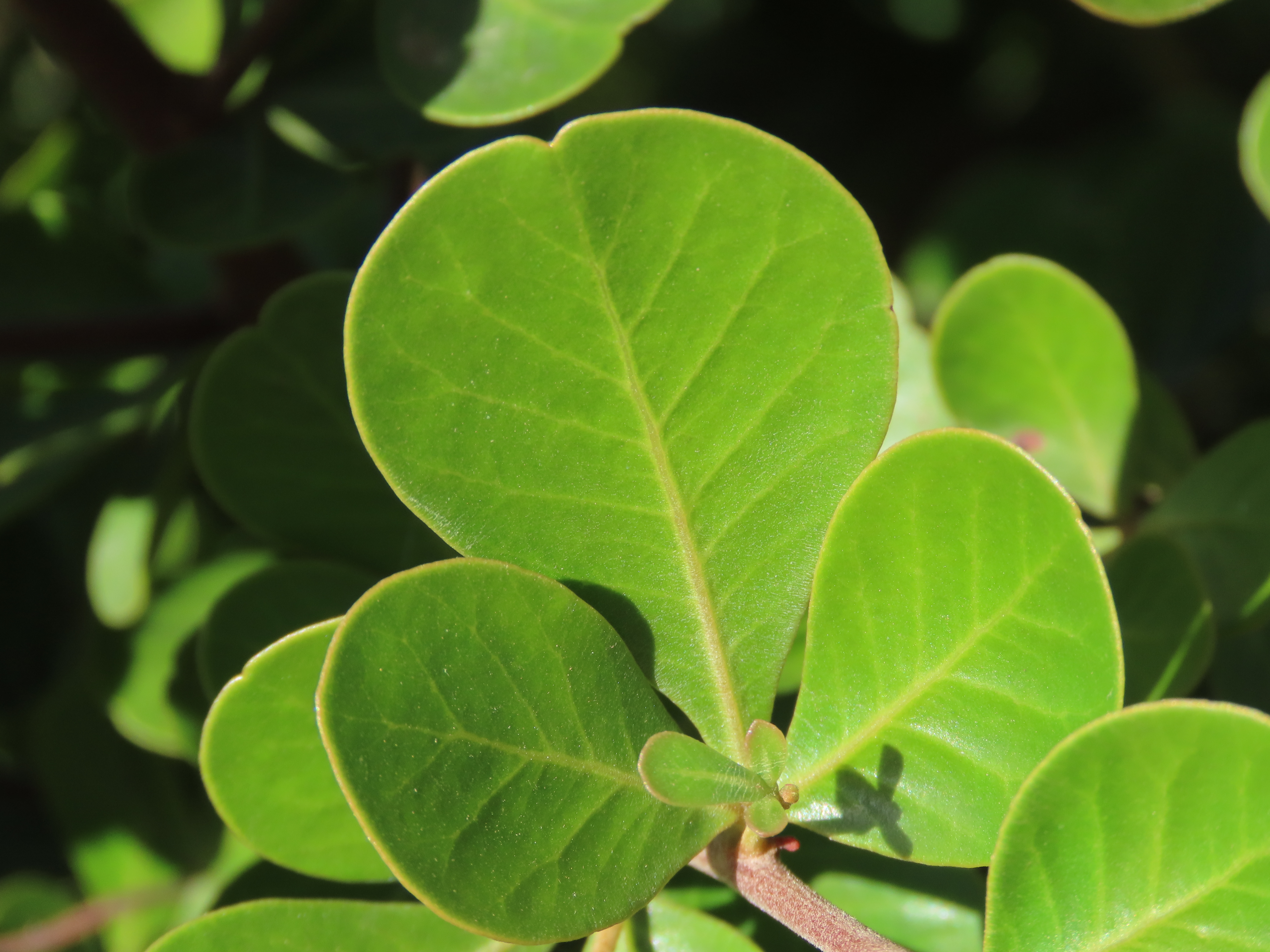
The central leaflets of the ternate leaves of Searsia glauca are oblate and commonly retuse.

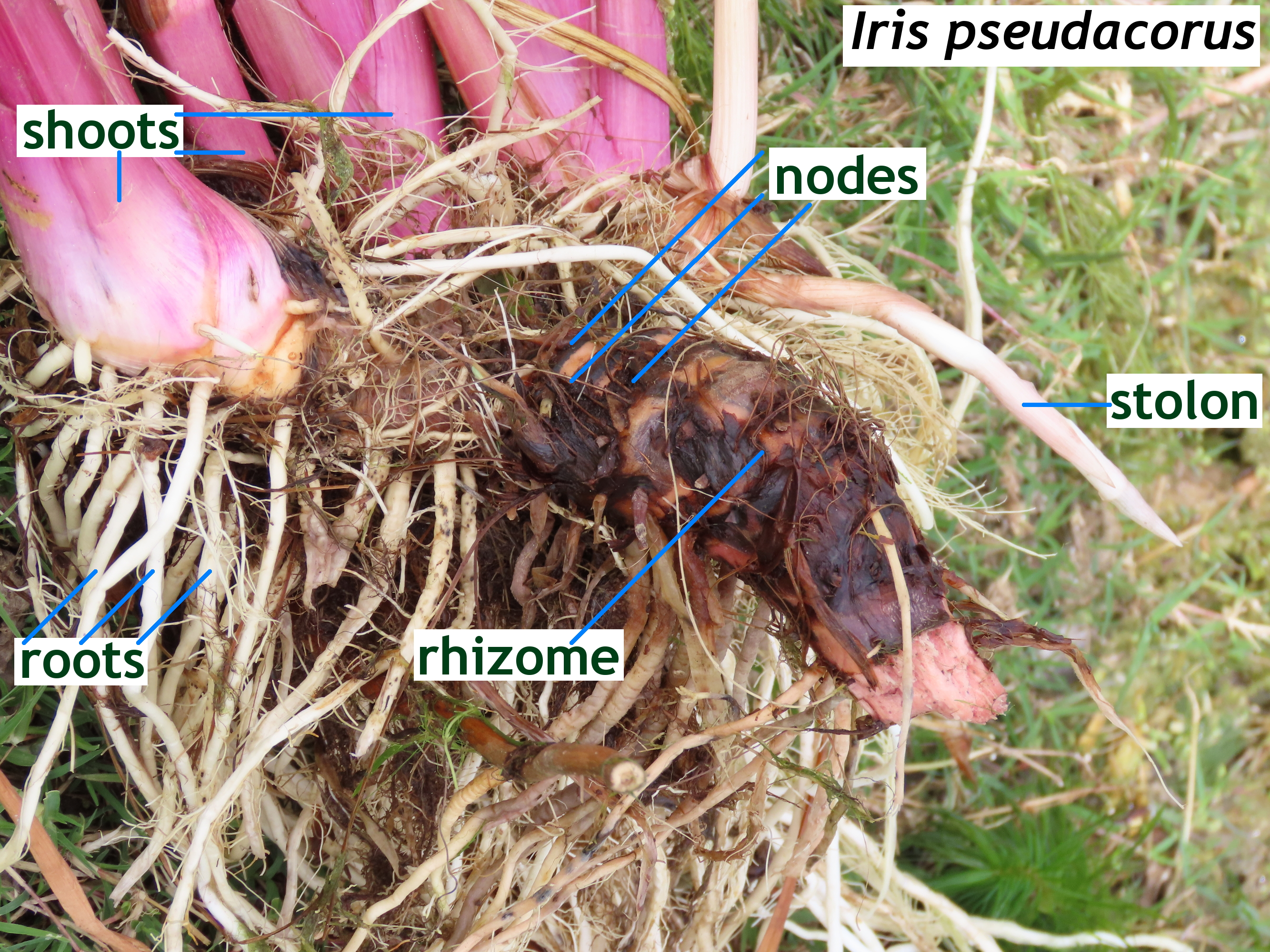
Typical rhizome. This one is a specimen of Iris pseudacorus.

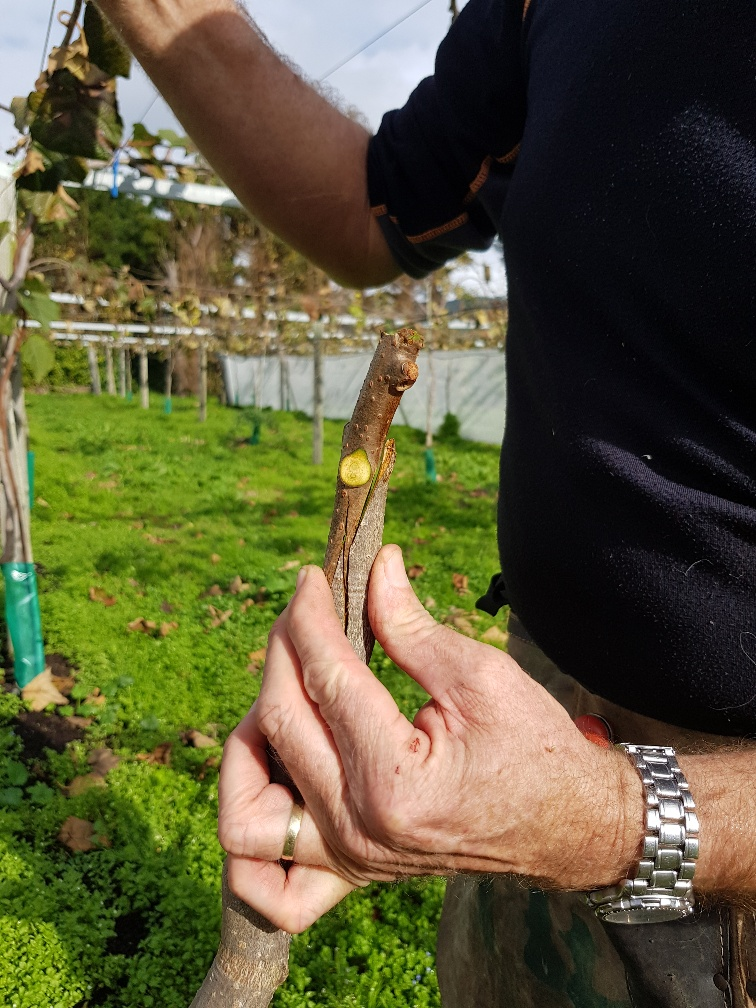
Grafting kiwifruit vine scion onto rootstock below

raceme

An indeterminate inflorescence in which the main axis produces a series of flowers on lateral stalks, the oldest at the base and the youngest at the top. Compare spike. Also racemiform or racemoid - having the form of a raceme.
rachilla (rhachilla)
1. the axis of a grass spikelet, above the glumes; see spikelet.
2. the rachis of higher order in leaves that are compound more than once
rachis

The axis of an inflorescence or a pinnate leaf; for example ferns; secondary rachis is the axis of a pinna in a bipinnate leaf distal to and including the lowermost pedicel attachment.
radial
With structures radiating from a central point as spokes on a wheel (e.g. the lateral spines of a cactus).
radiate
(of daisies, of a capitulum) With ray floret surrounding disc florets.
radical
Springing from the root; clustered at base of stem.
radicle
The part of an embryo giving rise to the root system of a plant. Compare plumule.
rainforest
A moist temperate or tropical forest dominated by broad-leaved trees that form a continuous canopy.
ramet
An individual member of a clone.
ramicaul
a single-leafed stem, as in Pleurothallis orchids.
ramiflory
Having flowers or fruits growing directly from a tree's branches.
ramify
To divide or spread out into individual branches or branchlike parts.
ray
1. zygomorphic (ligulate) flowers in a radiate flowerhead, that is, ray-florets/flowers, for example Asteraceae.
2. each of the branches of an umbel.
recalcitrant
(Of a seed) No longer viable after drying or freezing and thus unable to be stored for long periods.
receptacle
the axis of a flower, in other words, floral axis; torus; for example in Asteraceae, the floral base or receptacle is the expanded tip of the peduncle on which the flowers are inserted.
recumbent
bent back toward or below the horizontal.
recurved
bent or curved backward or downward.
reduplicate
folded outward, or with the two abaxial surfaces together.
reflexed
bent sharply back or down.
registered name
a cultivar name accepted by the relevant International Cultivar Registration Authority.
registration
1. the act of recording a new cultivar name with an International Cultivar Registration Authority.
2. recording a new cultivar name with a statutory authority like the Plant Breeder's Rights Office.
3. recording a trademark with a trade marks office.
regular
See actinomorphic.
reiteration
upright limb
reniform
Kidney-shaped.
replum
a framework-like placenta to which the seeds attach, and which remains after each valve drops away.
resupinate
Describing leaves or flowers that are in an inverted position because the petiole or pedicel, respectively, is twisted 180 degrees. compare: hyper-resupinate.
reticulate
forming a network (or reticulum), e.g. veins that join one another at more than one point.
retrorse
Bent backward or downward. Compare antrorse.
retuse
Having a blunt (obtuse) and slightly notched apex.
revision
an account of a particular plant group, like an abbreviated or simplified monograph. Sometimes confined to the plants of a particular region. Similar to a monograph in clearly distinguishing the taxa and providing a means for their identification. Compare monograph.
revolute
rolled under (downward or backward), for example when the edges of leaves are rolled under toward the midrib. Compare involute.
rhachis
See rachis.
rhizodermis
the root epidermis, the outermost primary cell layer of the root
rhizome
a perennial underground stem usually growing horizontally. See also stolon. Abbreviation: rhiz.
rhizomatous
(adj.) having above-ground stems that are derived from below-ground stems (rhizomes). Compare arhizomatous (arhizomatic).
rhizosphere
the below-ground surface of plants and adjacent soil as a habitat for microorganisms.
rhytidome
the dead region of the bark and root that lies outside the periderm.
rhombic
like a rhombus: an oblique figure with four equal sides. Compare trapeziform and trullate.
rhomboid
a four-sided figure with opposite sides parallel but with adjacent sides an unequal length (like an oblique rectangle); see also rhombic.
rhomboidal
a shape, for instance of a leaf, that is roughly diamond-shaped with length equal to width.
rimose
with many cracks, as in the surface of a crustose areolate lichen.
root
a unit of a plant's axial system which is usually underground, does not bear leaves, tends to grow downward, and is typically derived from the radicle of the embryo.
root hairs
outgrowths of the outermost layer of cells just behind the root tips, functioning as water-absorbing organs.
root microbiome
the dynamic community of microorganisms associated with plant roots.
rootstock
1. the part of a budded or grafted plant which supplies the root system, also simply called a stock.
2. plants selected to produce a root system with some specific attribute, e.g. a virus-free rootstock.
rosette
when parts are not whorled or opposite but appear so, due to the contractions of internodes, e.g. the petals in a double rose or a basal cluster of leaves (usually close to the ground) in some plants.
rostellate
possessing a beak (rostellum). Synonym of rostrate.
rostrate
with a beak.
rotate
circular and flattened; for example a corolla with a very short tube and spreading lobes (for instance some Solanaceae).
ruderal
a plant that colonises or occupies disturbed waste ground. See also weed.
rudiment
In the structure of a plant, an item that is at best hardly functional, either because it is immature and has not yet completed its development (such as a leaf still incompletely formed inside a bud), or because its role in the organism's morphology cannot be completed and therefore is futile (such as the leaf rudiment at the tip of a phyllode, that will be shed while immature, because the leaf function will be taken over by the phyllode). Compare cataphyll and vestige.
rudimentary
Being of the nature of a rudiment; at most barely functional because incompletely developed; begun, but far from completed, either temporarily or permanently. Compare vestigial.
rugose
Wrinkled, either covered with wrinkles, or crumpled like a wrinkled leaf, either as a stiffening structure, or in response to disease or insect damage.
rugulose
Finely wrinkled.
ruminate
(usually applied to endosperm) Irregularly grooved or ridged; appearing chewed, e.g. the endosperm in certain members of Myristicaceae.
runcinate
Sharply pinnatifid or cleft, with the segments directed downward.
runner
See stolon.
rupicolous
Rupestral, saxicolous, growing on or among rocks. Compare epilithic and lithophytic.
rush
A plant of the family Juncaceae or, more loosely, applied to various monocotyledons.
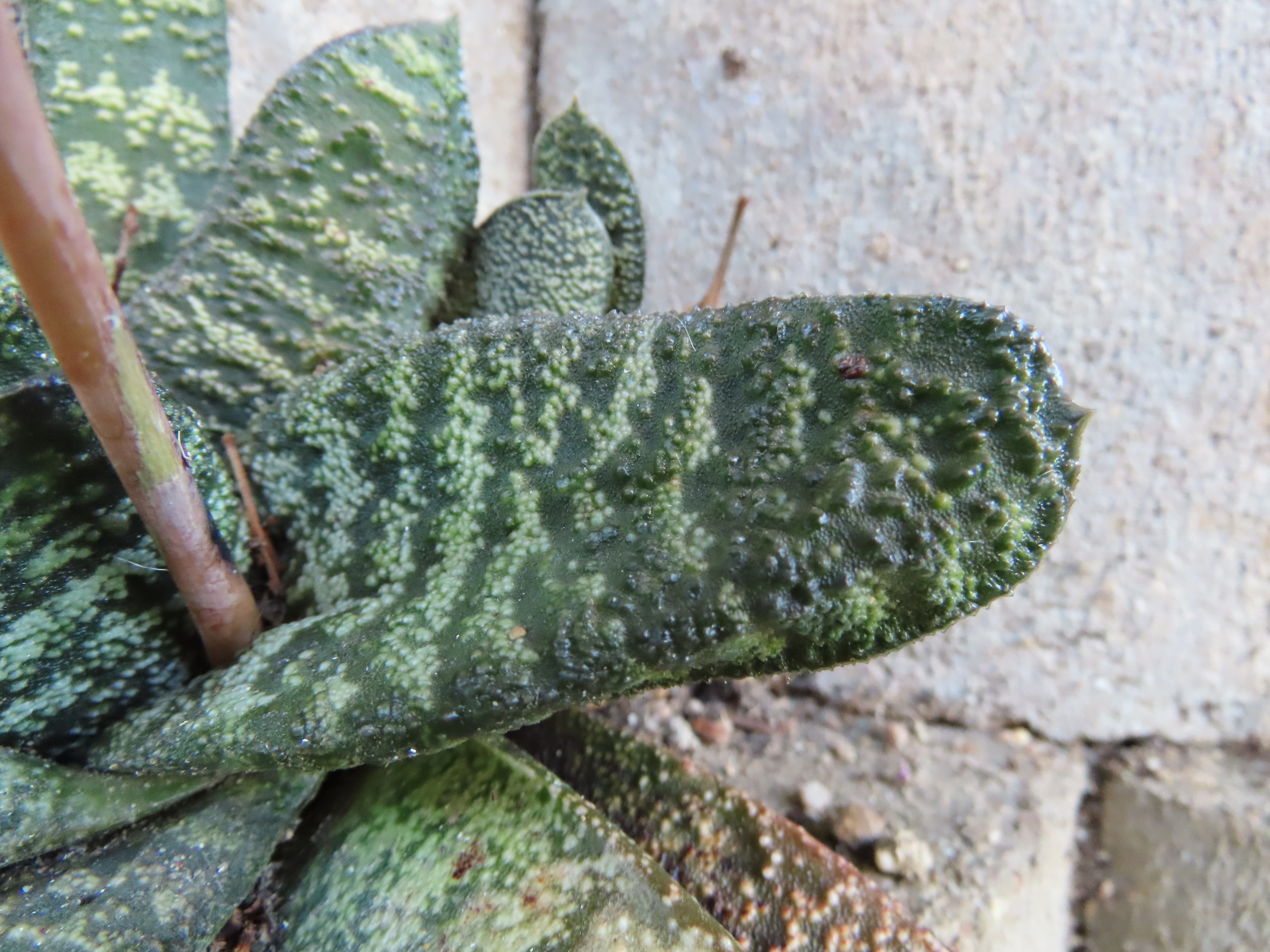
Unidentified Gasteria bearing leaves with a rugose surface, banded with callosities

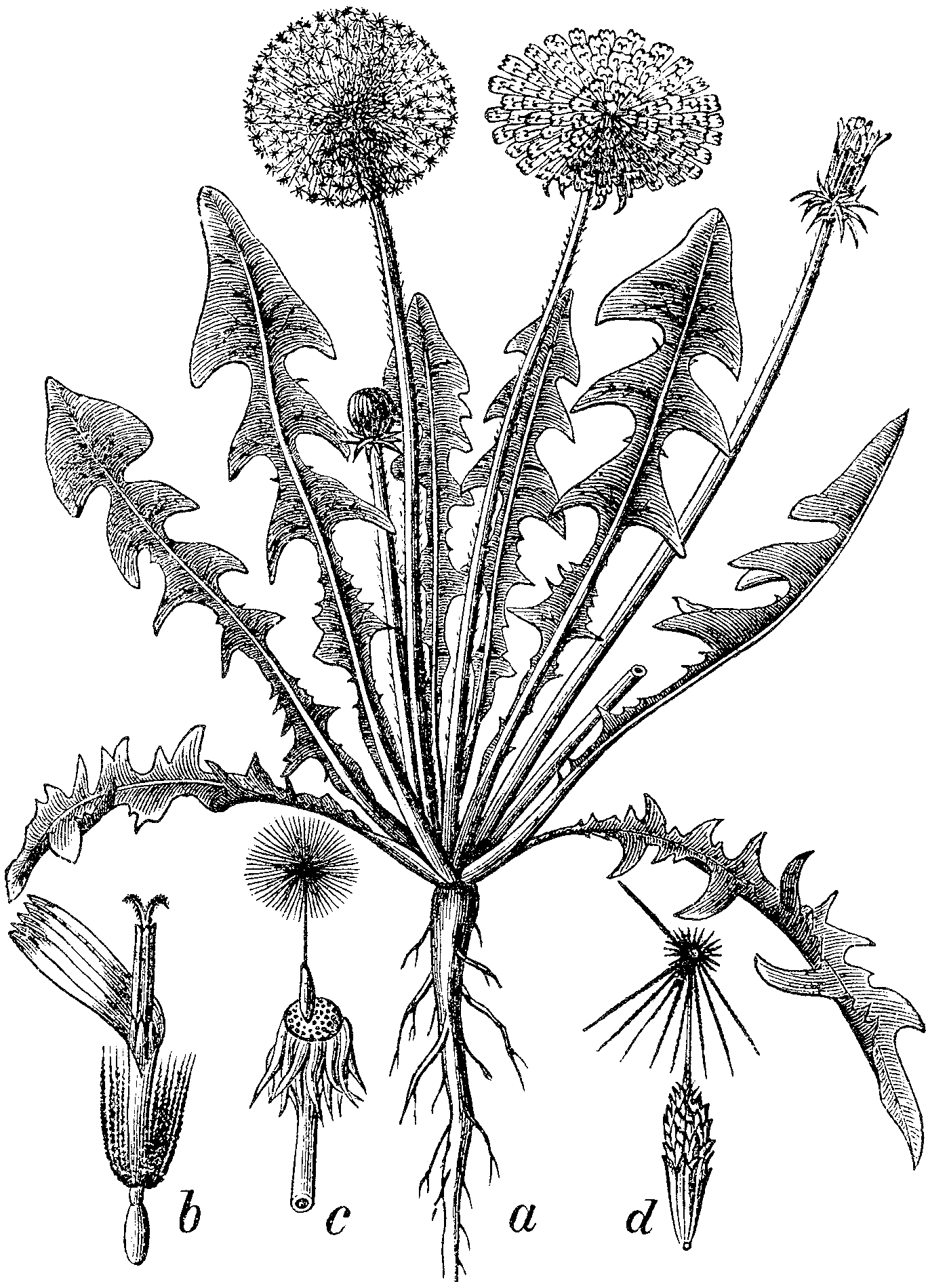
The runcinate lobes of a Taraxacum officinale leaf point downward, i.e. toward the stem.

== S ==
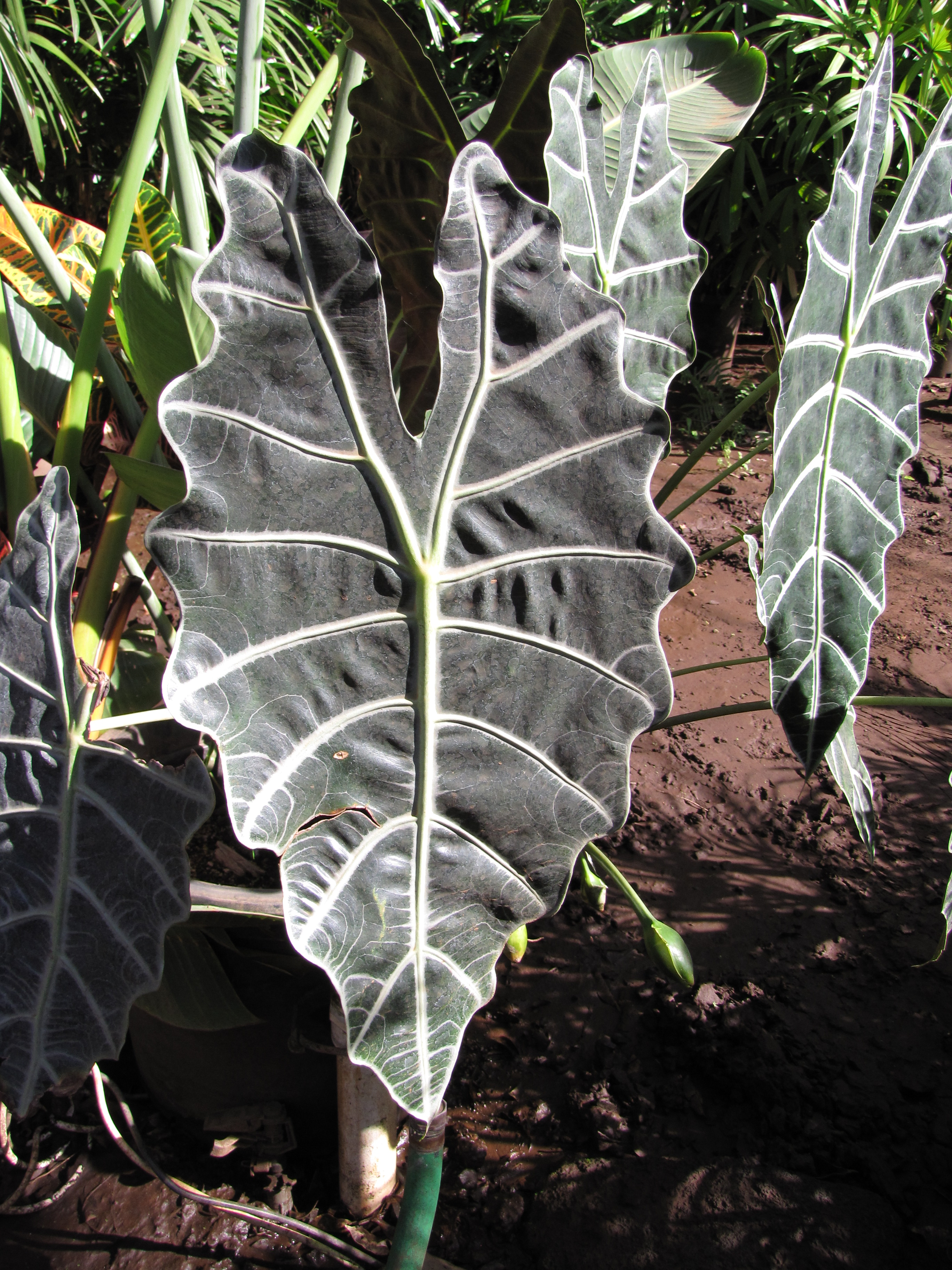
Sagittate leaves of an Alocasia plant

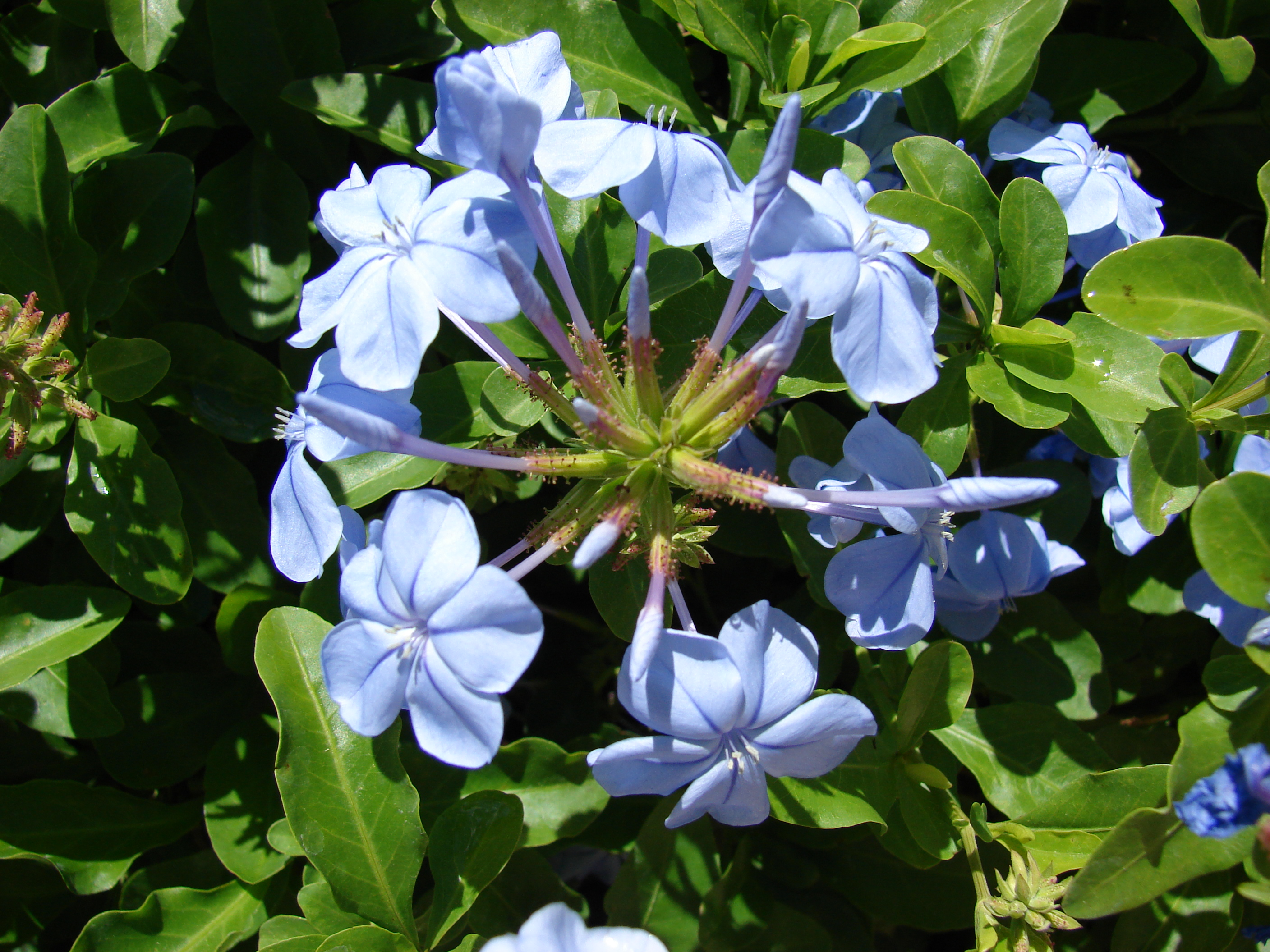
Salverform flowers of Plumbago auriculata

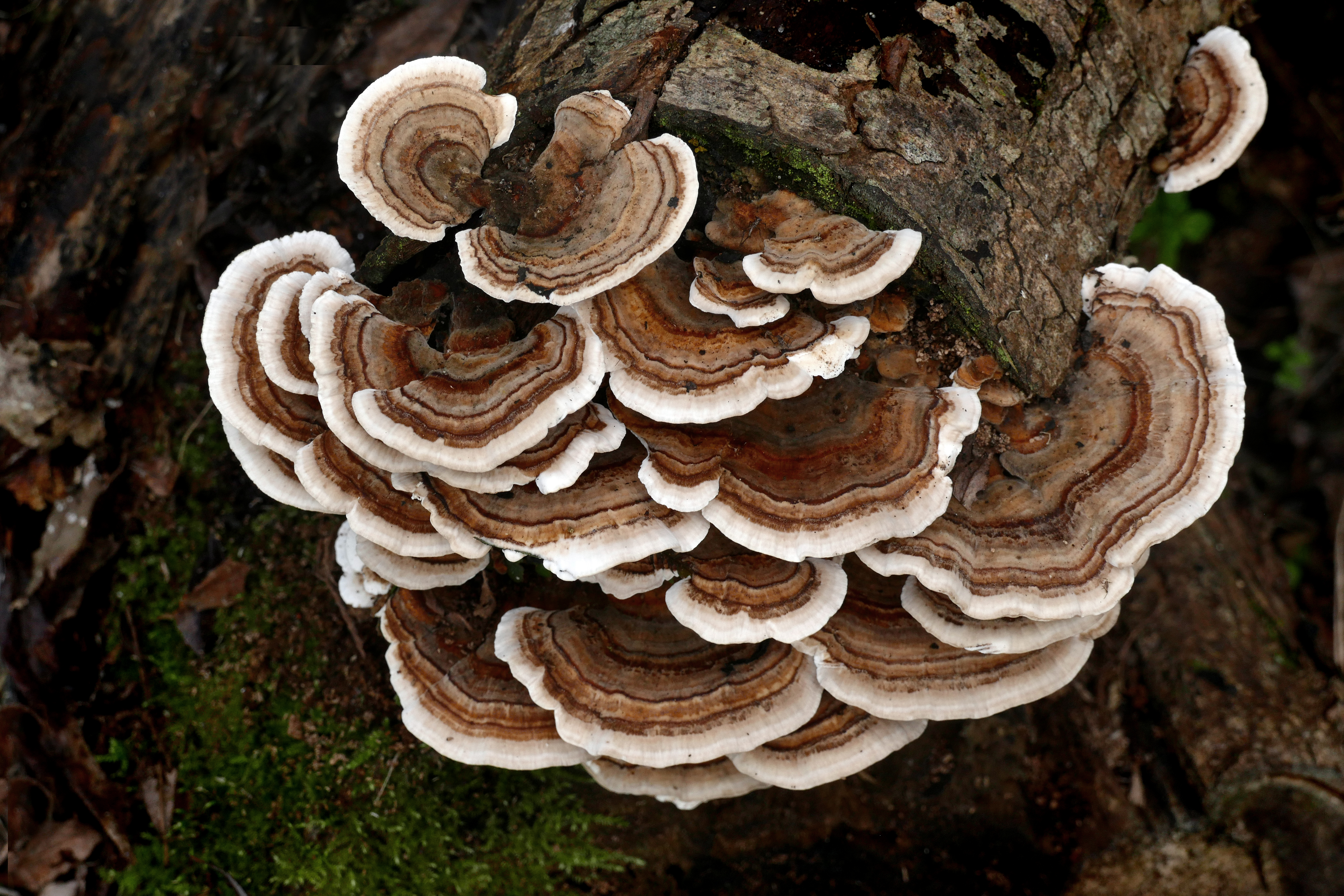
Trametes versicolor, the turkey tail fungus, is a saprotroph that consumes dead wood in forests. Its common name comes from the conspicuously patterned brackets, but the main body of the saprotroph consists of the largely invisible mycelium that penetrates the dead wood and digests it.

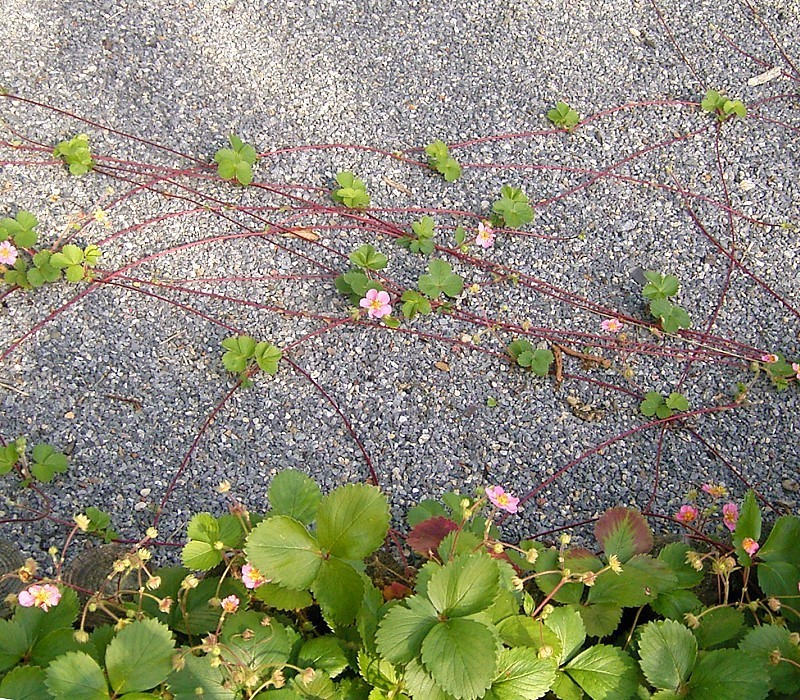
Strawberry plants reproduce mainly by sarments, stolons such as these, often called runners; at their nodes the sarments put up tufts of leaves and strike root if there is any good soil beneath.

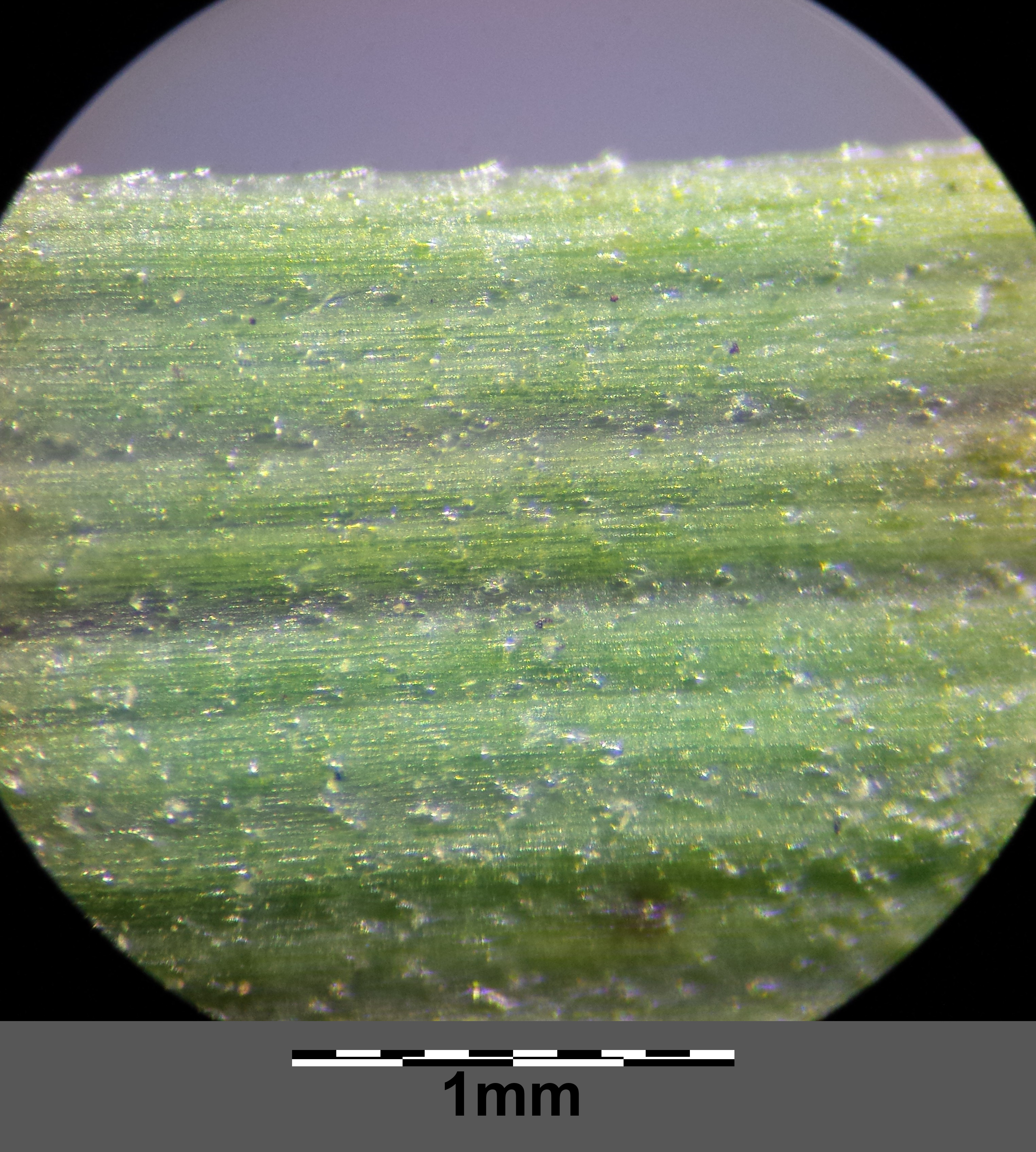
Micrograph of the scabrid undersurface of the leaf of Stipa pulcherrima.

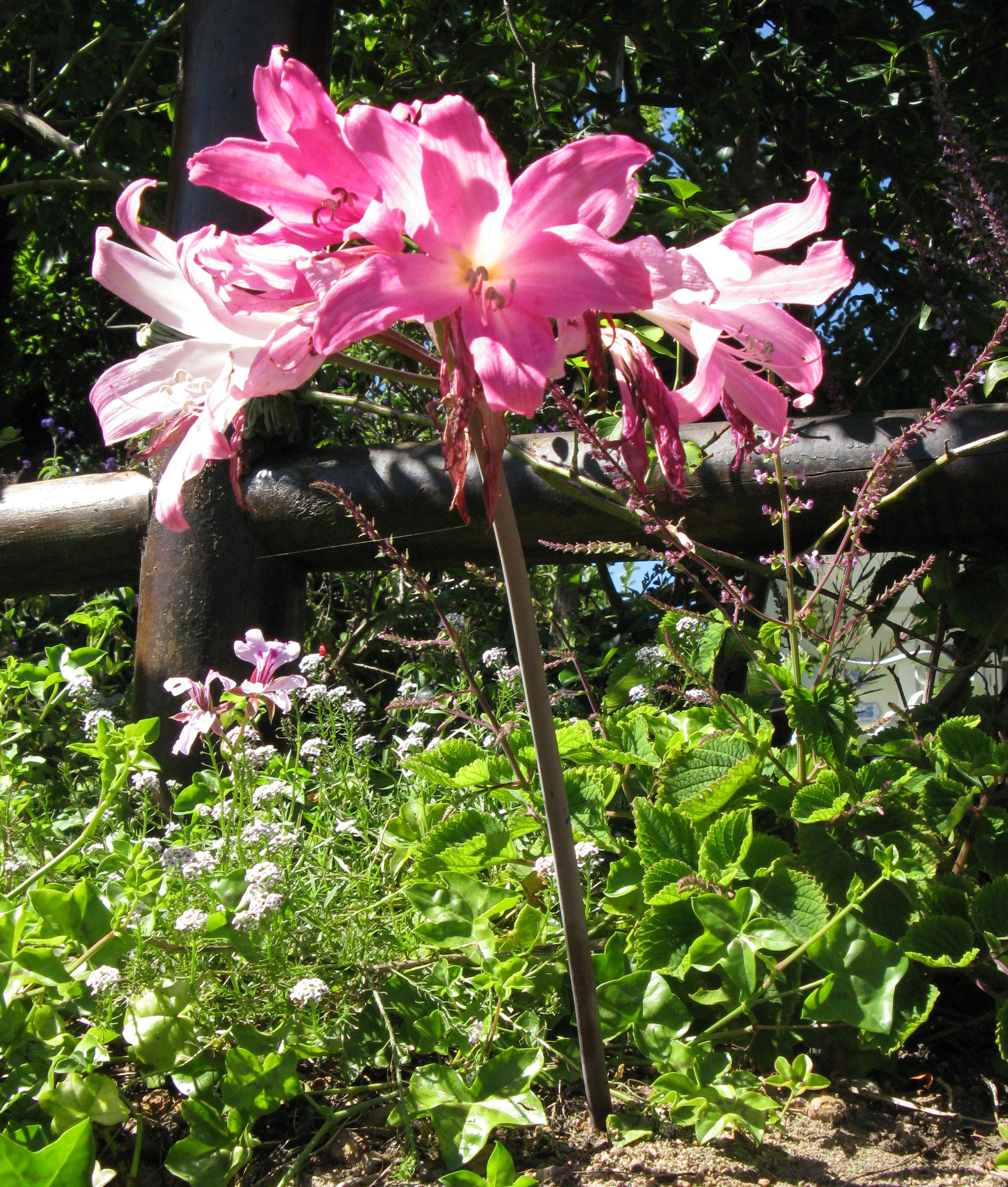
Amaryllis belladonna in flower, an example of a leafless scape emerging directly from the underground bulb before the seasonal leaves

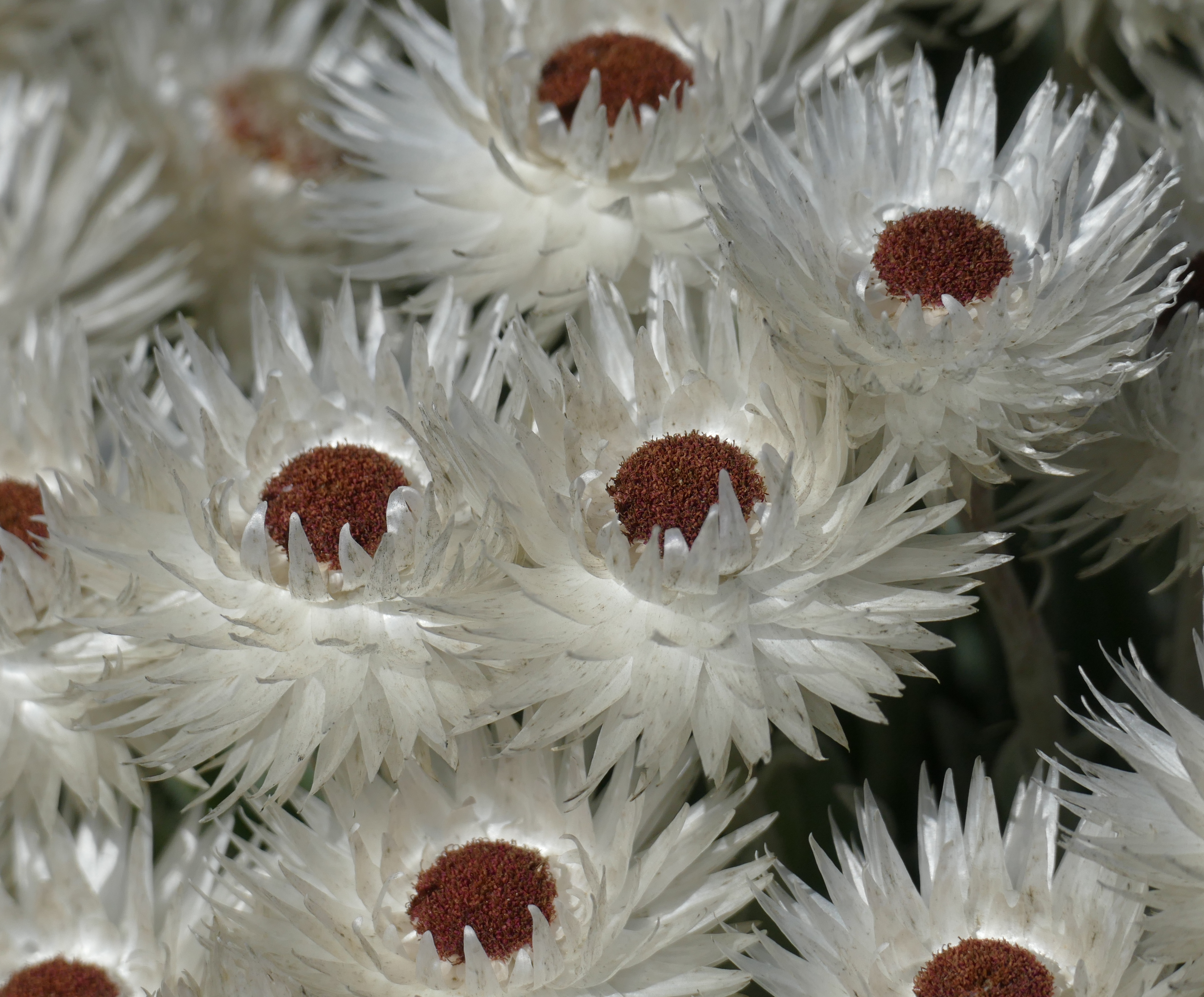
Involucral bracts of Syncarpha species are as scarious as tissue paper, but look like live petals for years, so they are known as "Everlastings" and valued for dried arrangements.

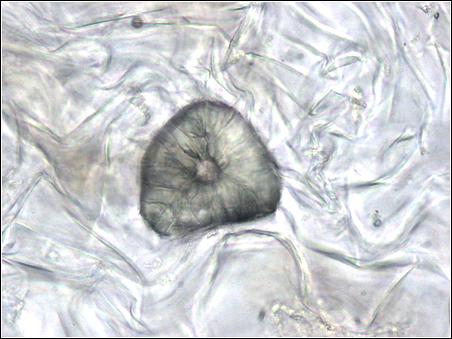
Isolated sclereid or stone cell in plant tissue

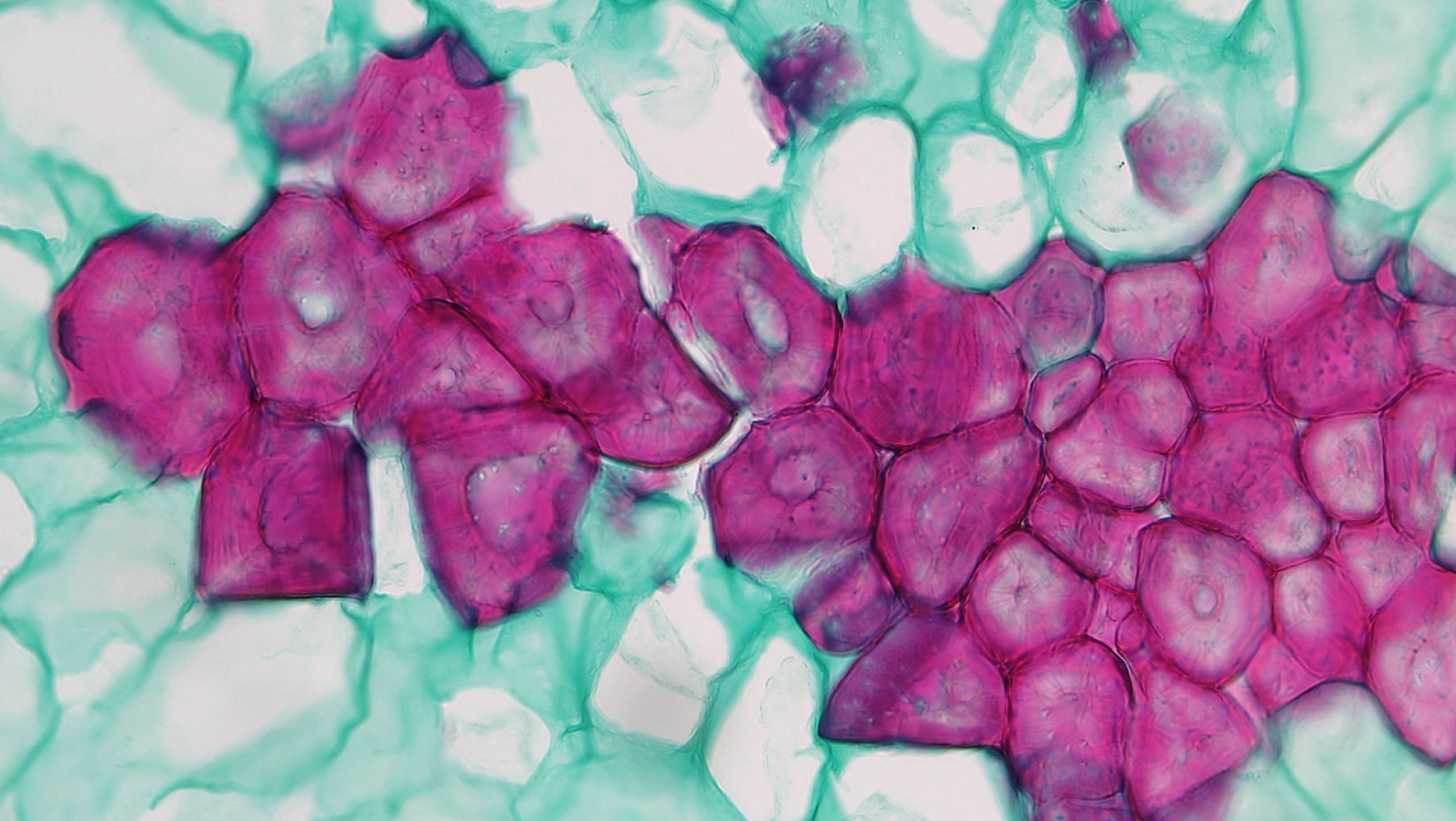
Sclereids in gritty particles of pear tissue

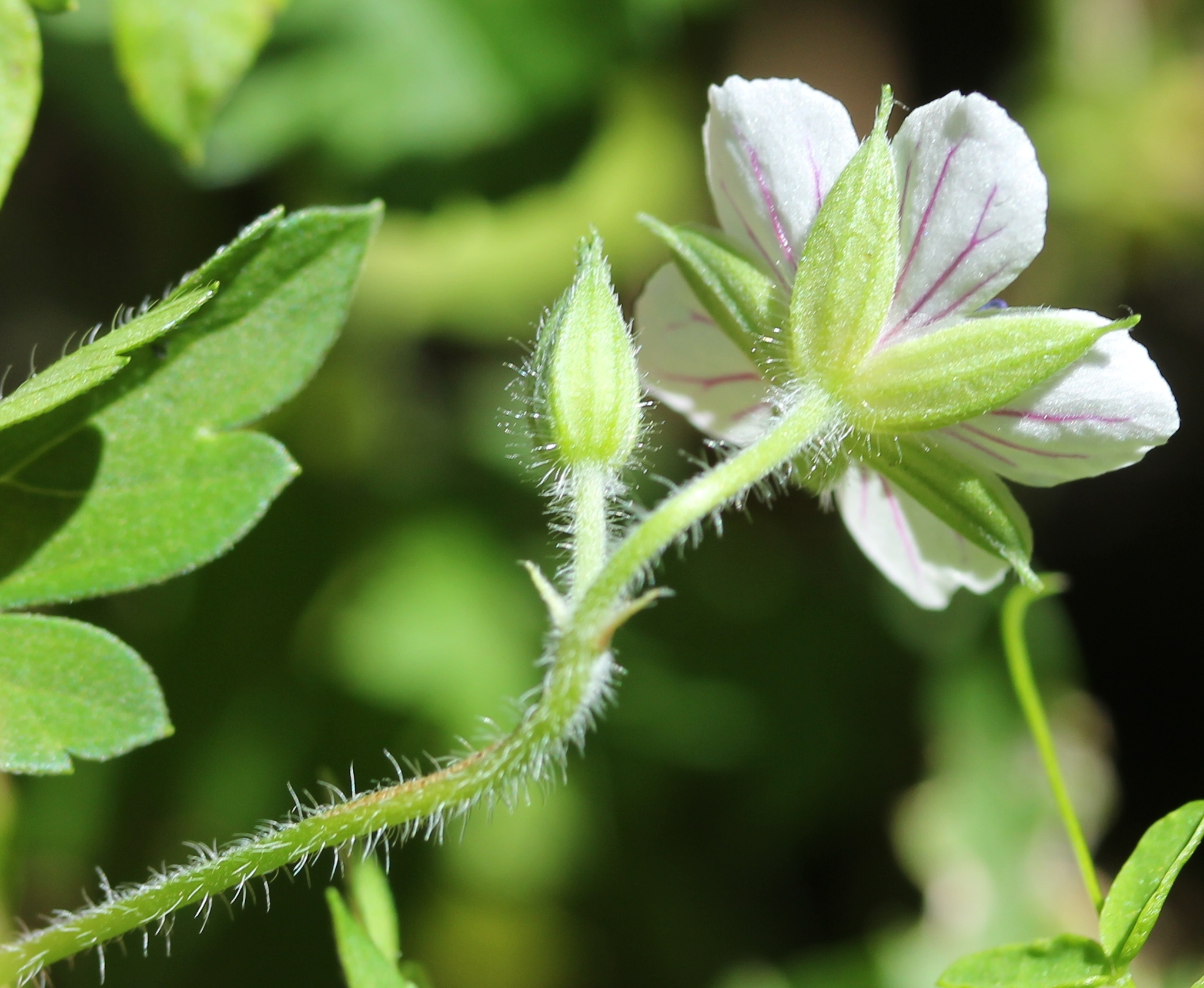
Sepals on Geranium thunbergii, five separated behind the petals of an open flower, and a connected set enclosing an unopened bud

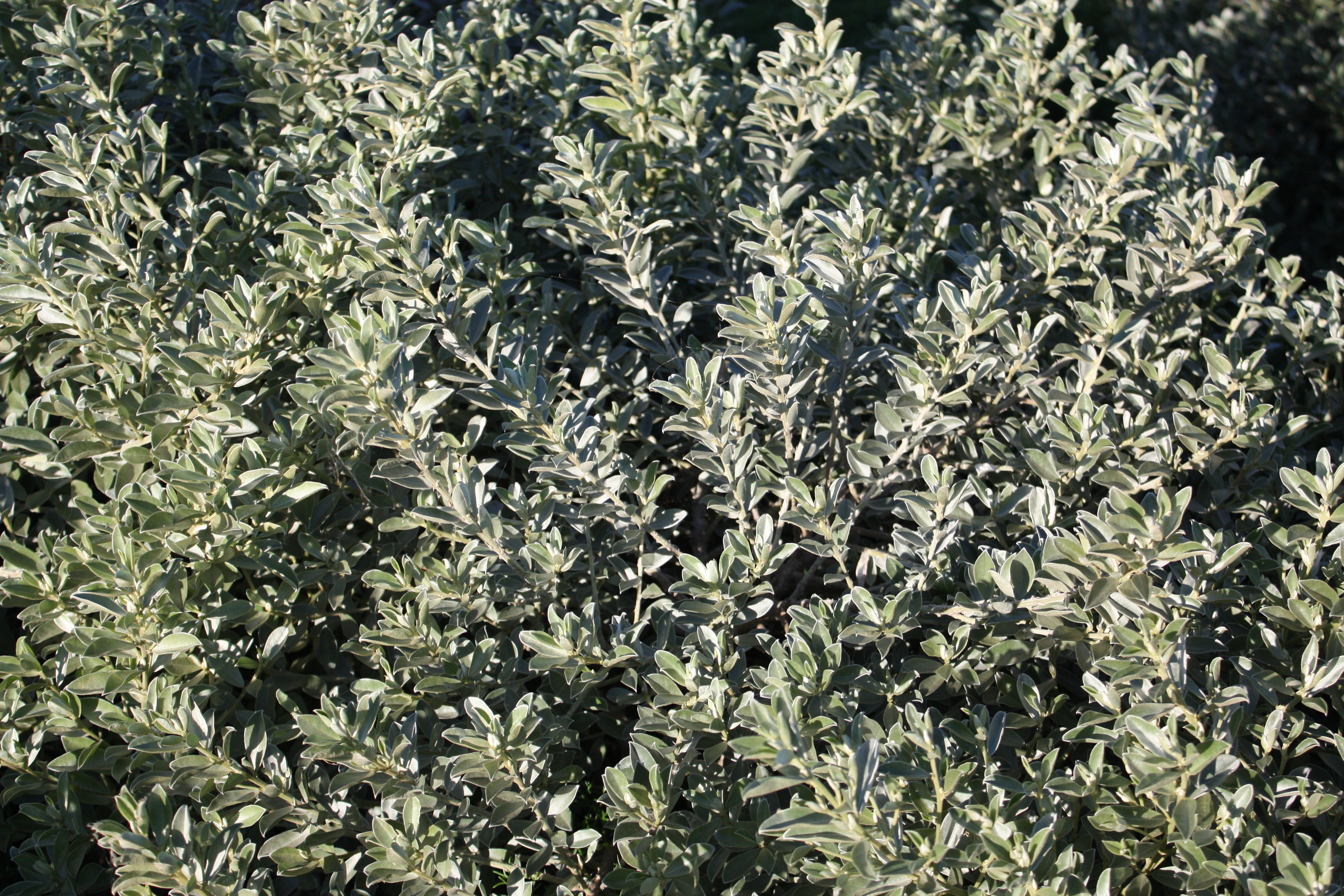
Sericeous leaves of Podalyria sericea, the silver sweet pea bush

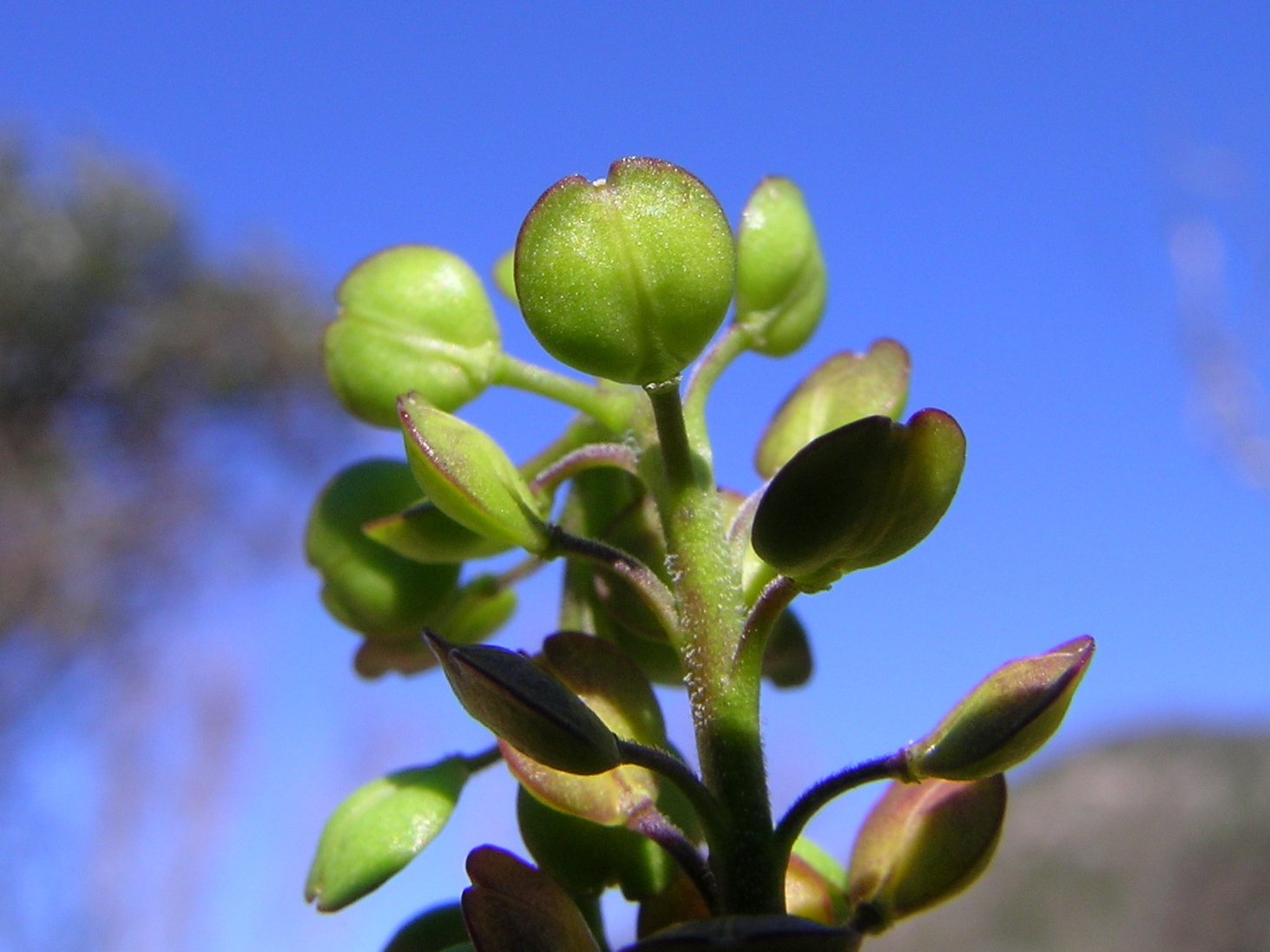
The fruits of Lepidium bonariense are silicles, green and circular, with a notch at the apex.

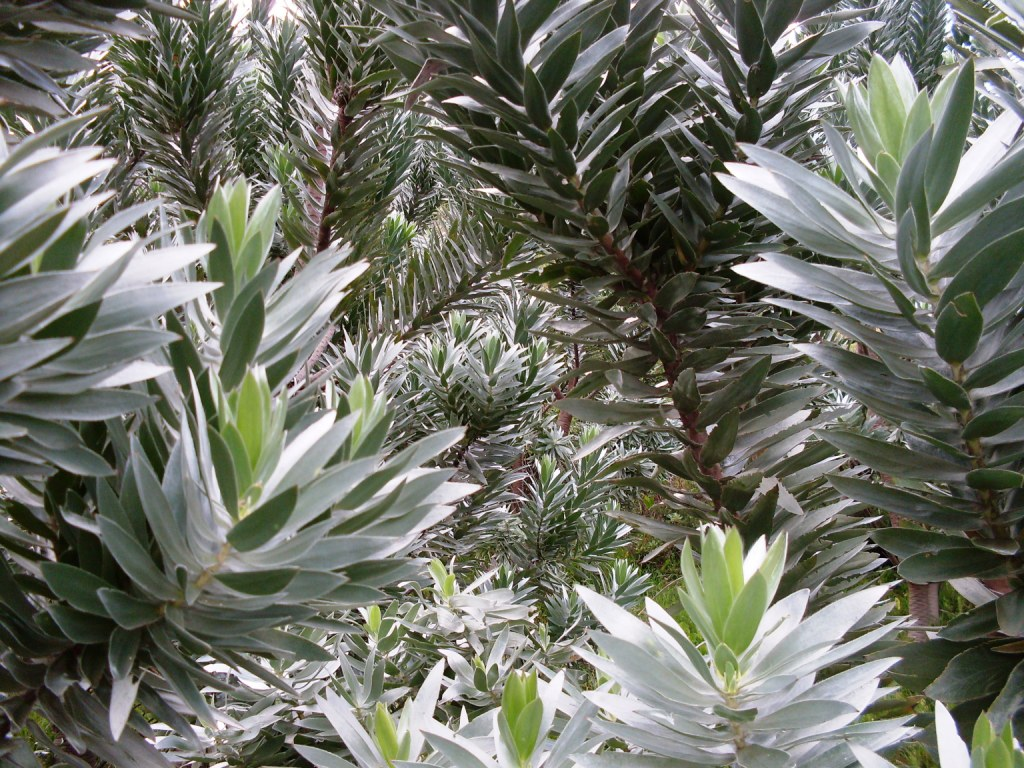
Silky foliage of the silvertree, Leucadendron argenteum

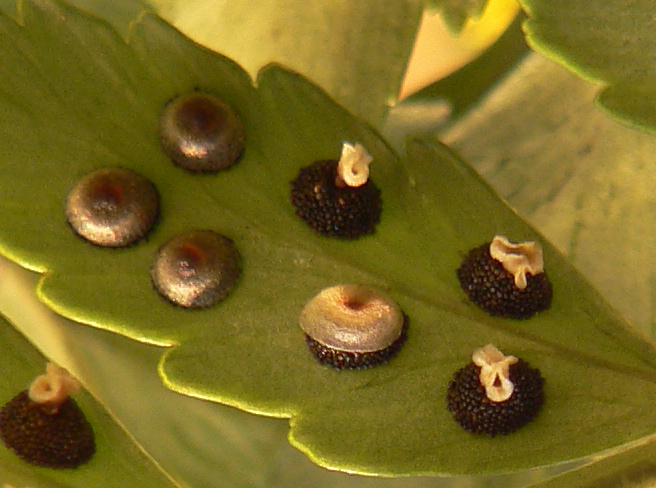
Sori under the leaf of the fern Rumohra adiantiformis. Some are still covered by their indusia.

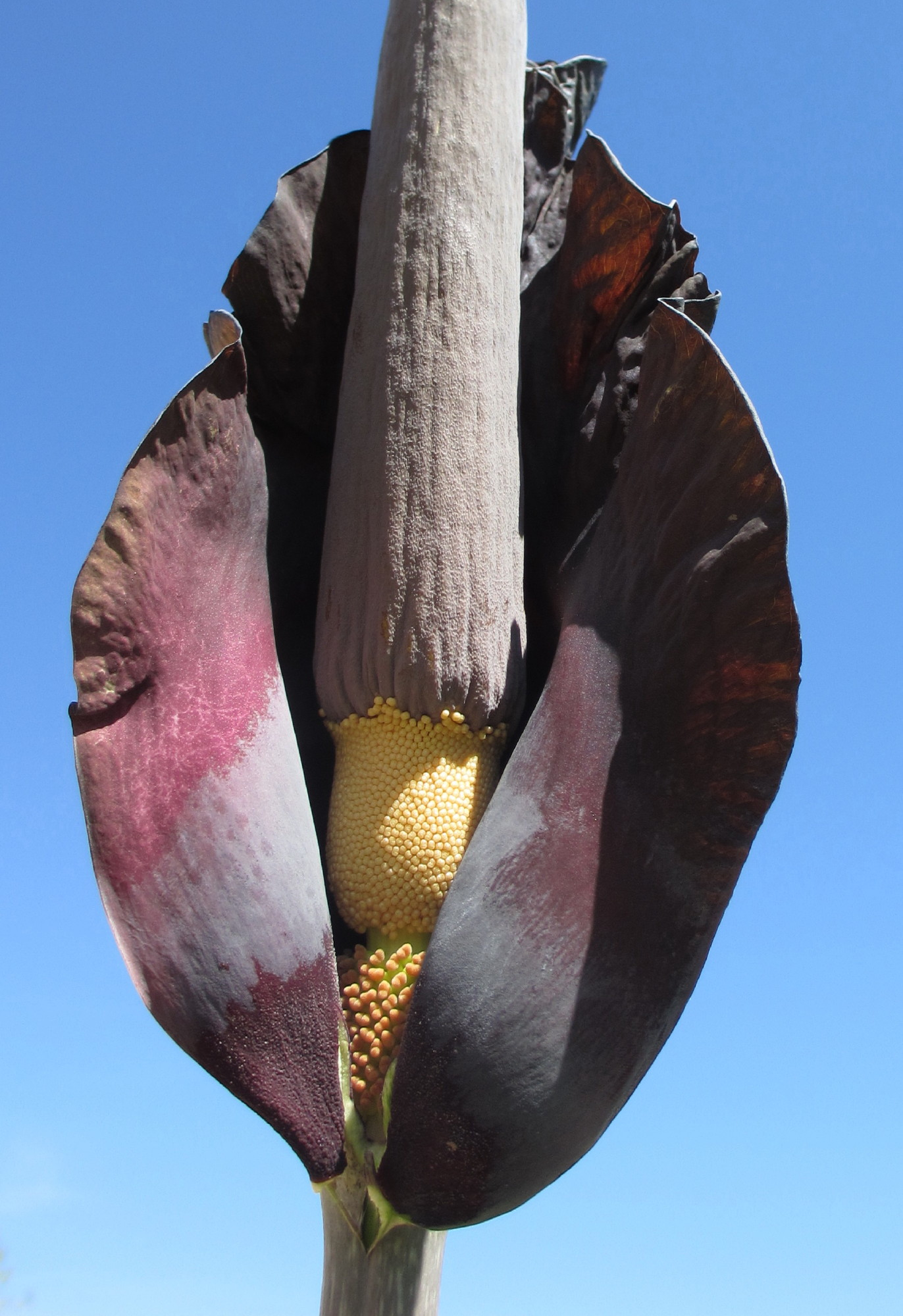
Spadix of Amorphophallus maximus within its spathe. The female flowers are around the bottom of the spadix, the male flowers above, and the sterile top part is the major source of pollinator attractants.

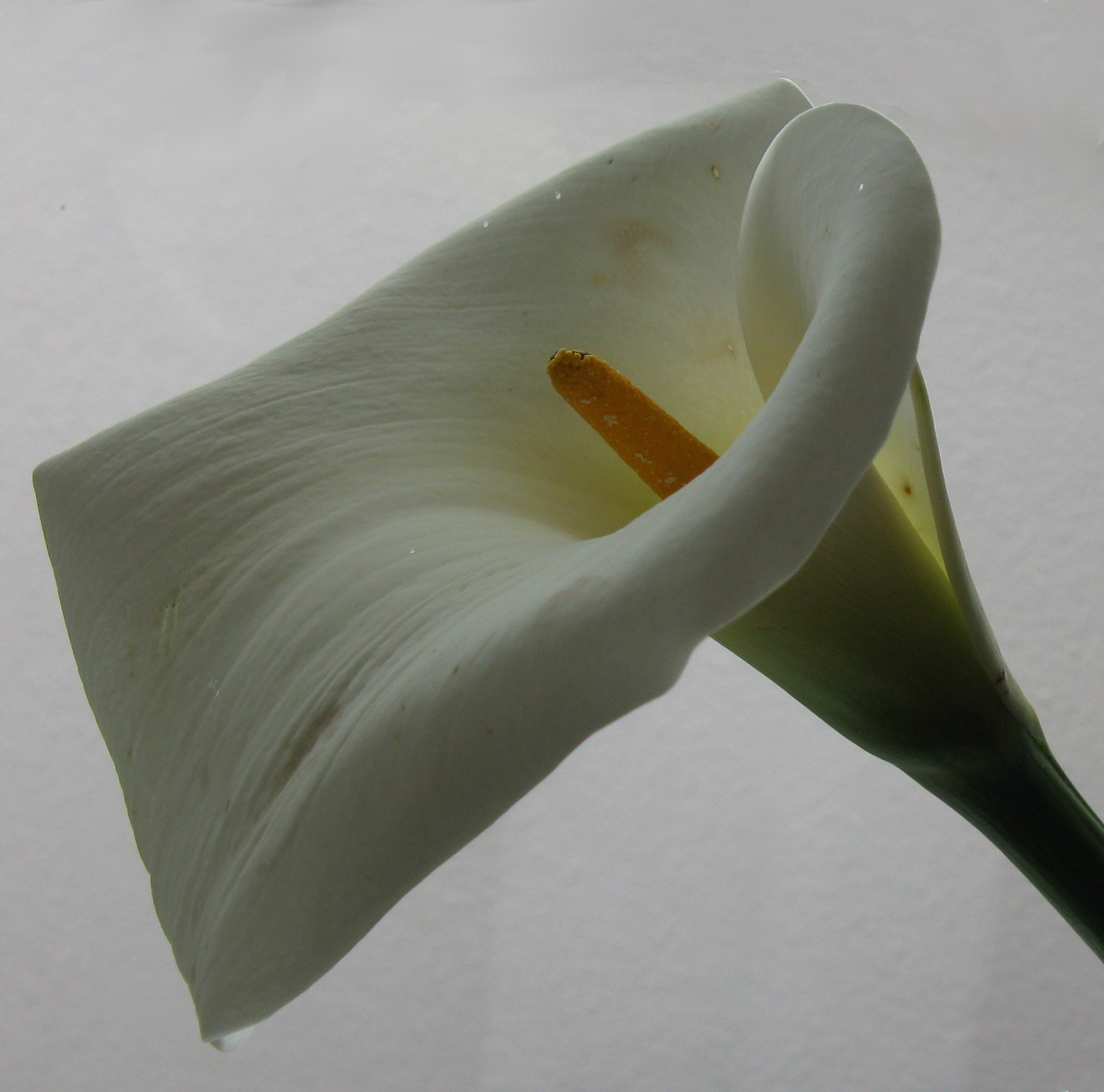
The convolute spathe around the spadix of Zantedeschia aethiopica

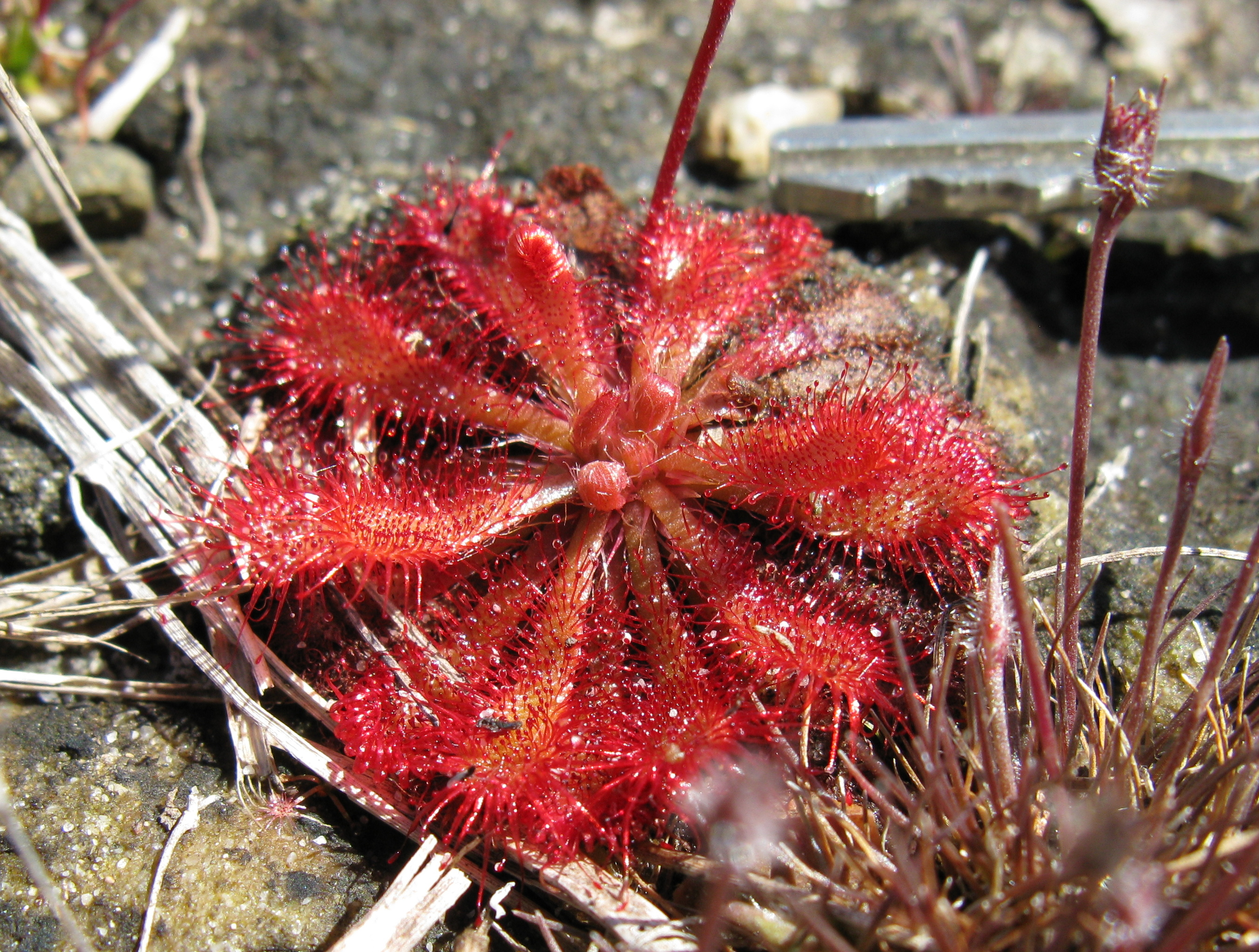
Drosera spatulata leaves are markedly spathulate.

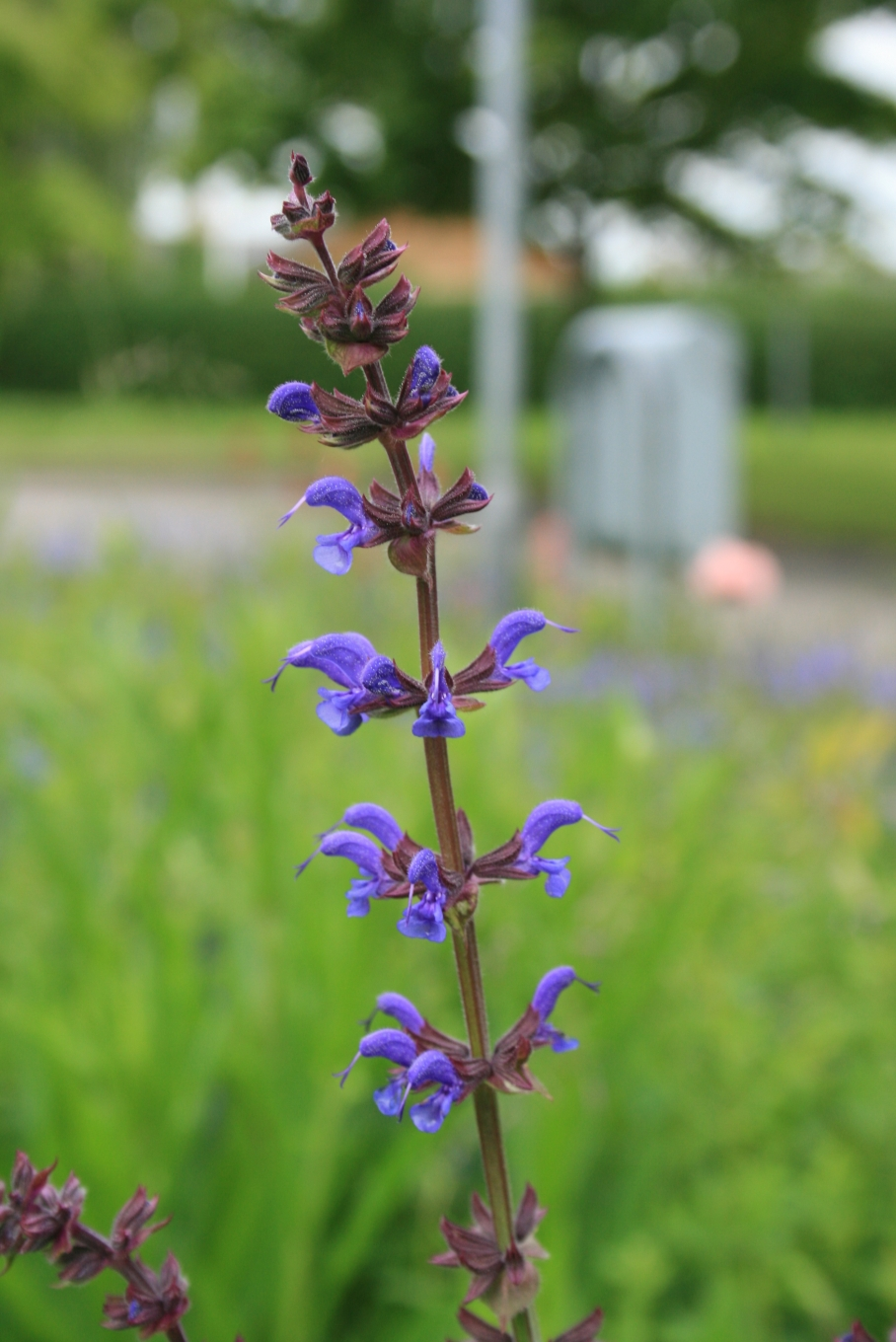
The flowering spike of this Salvia nemorosa differs from a raceme in that the flowers are practically sessile.

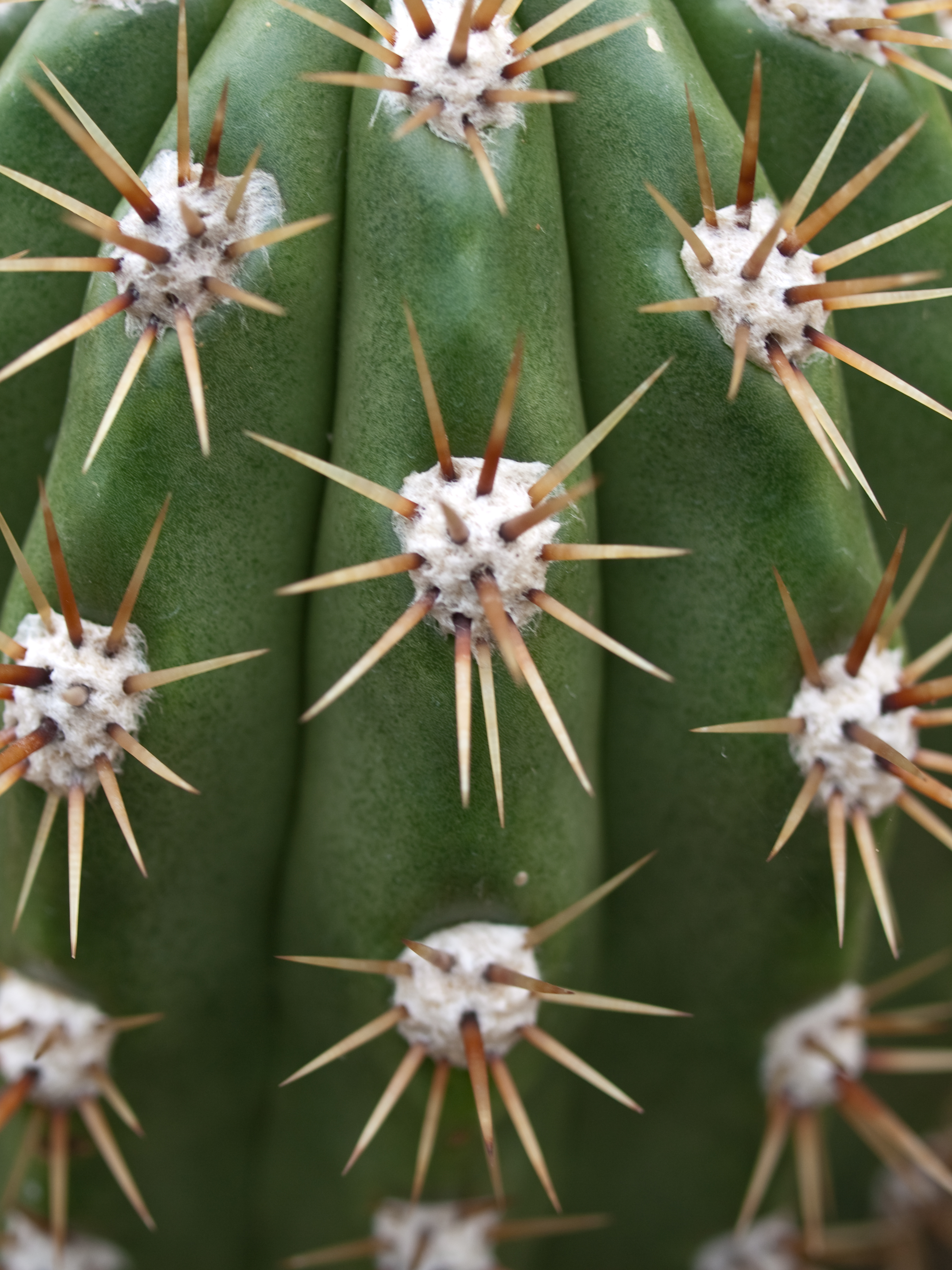
Spines emerging from the areoles of an Echinopsis species

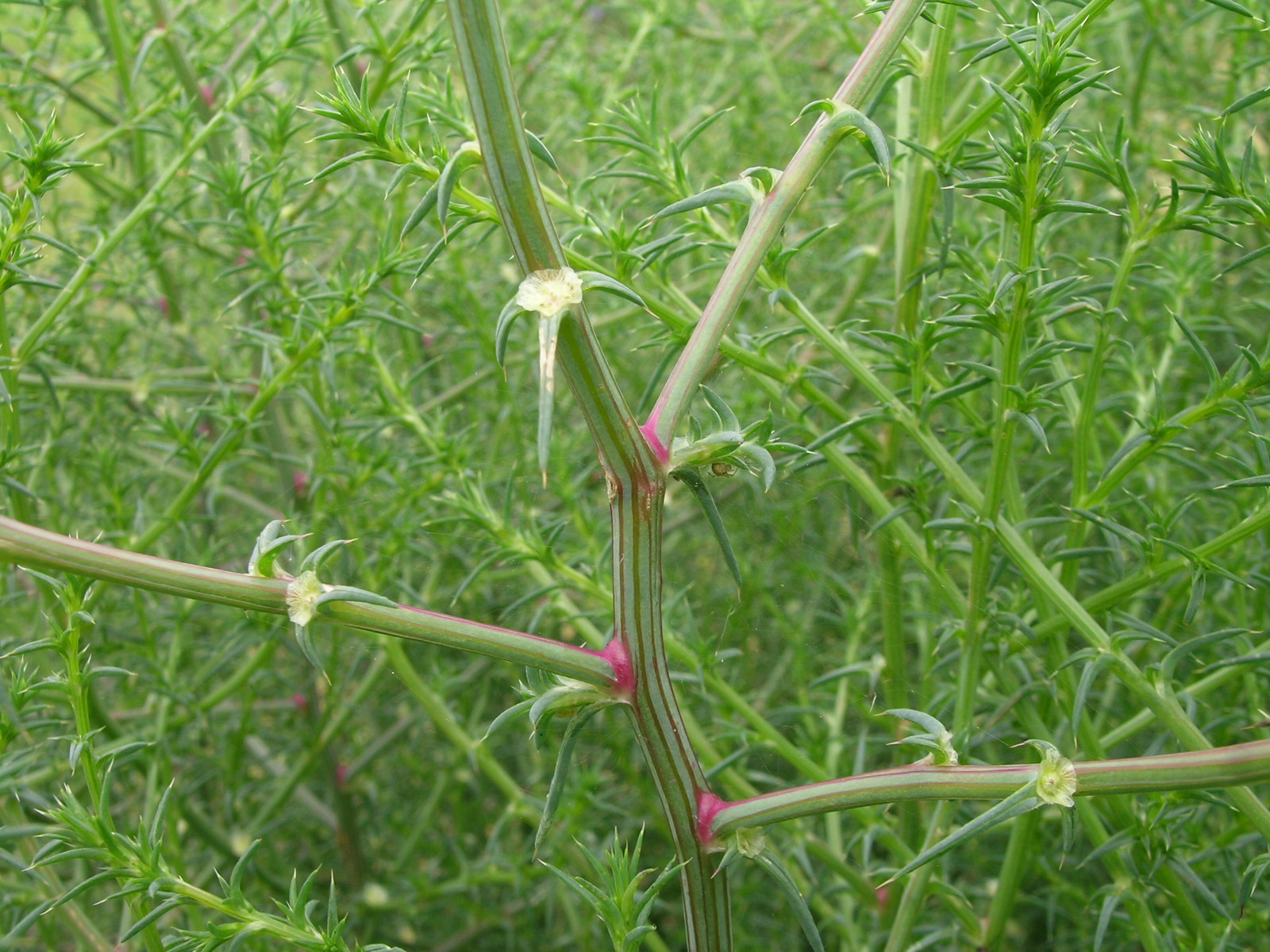
Spinescent leaves of Salsola australis: stiff, narrowed, and with lobes ending in spiny points

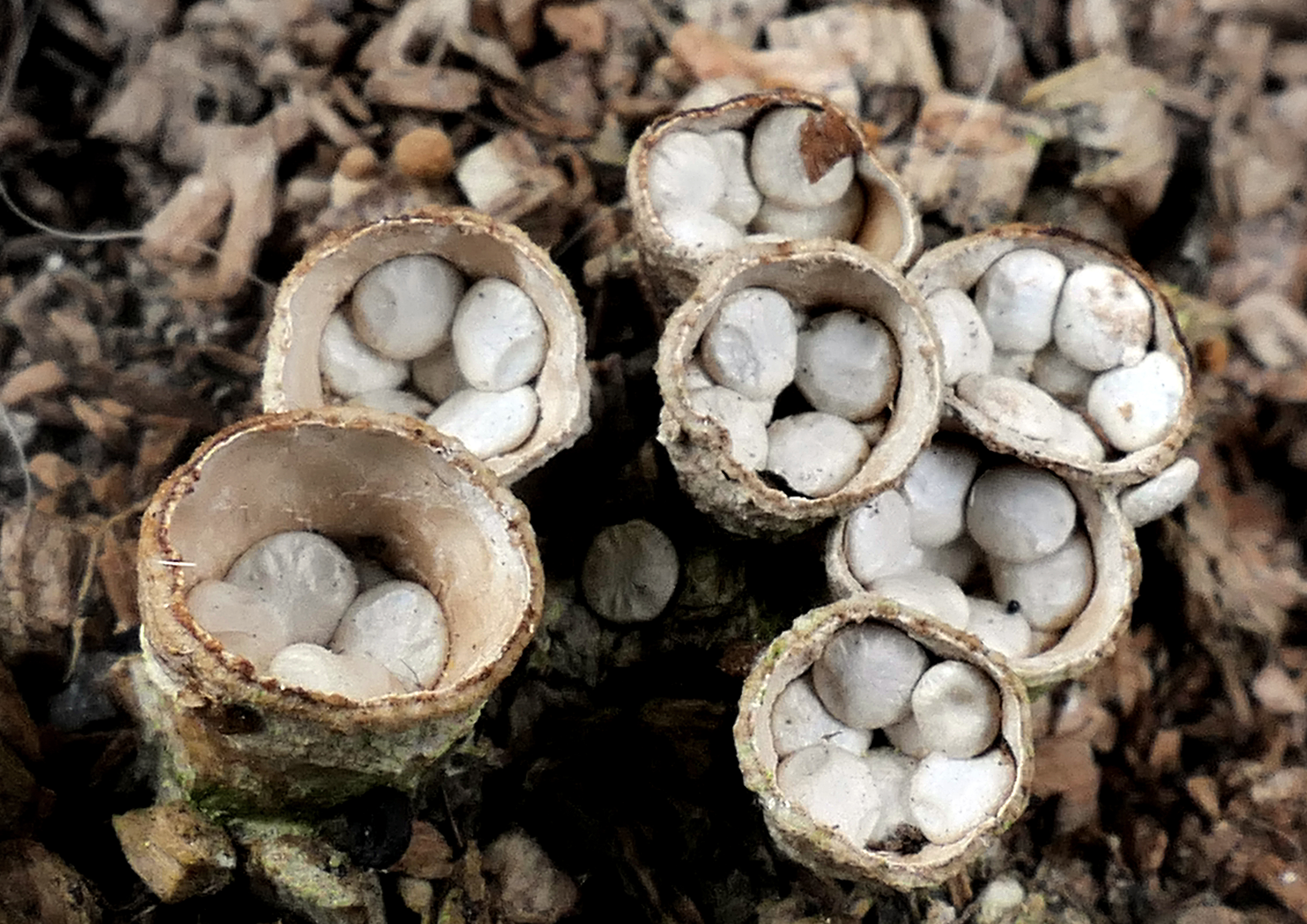
Bird nest fungi, Nidulariaceae, bear examples of splash-cups with spores that are spread by raindrops.

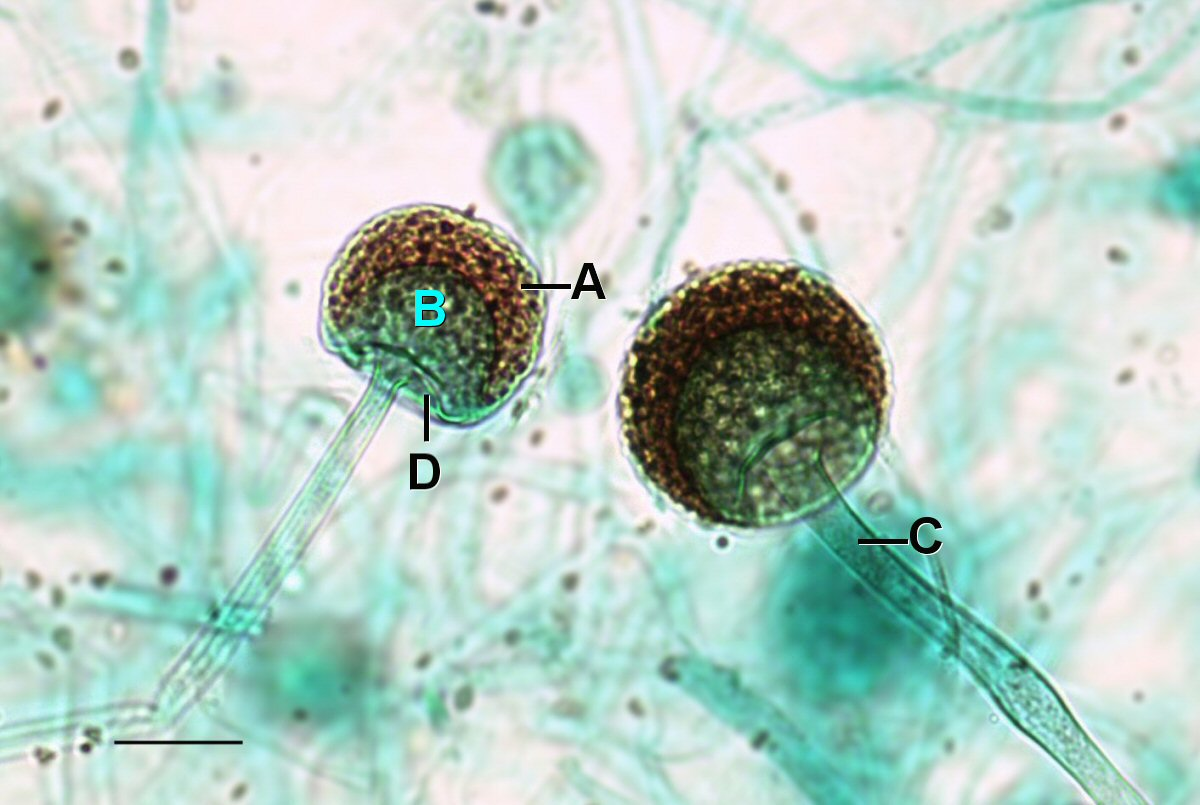
Sporangia of the fungus Rhizopus

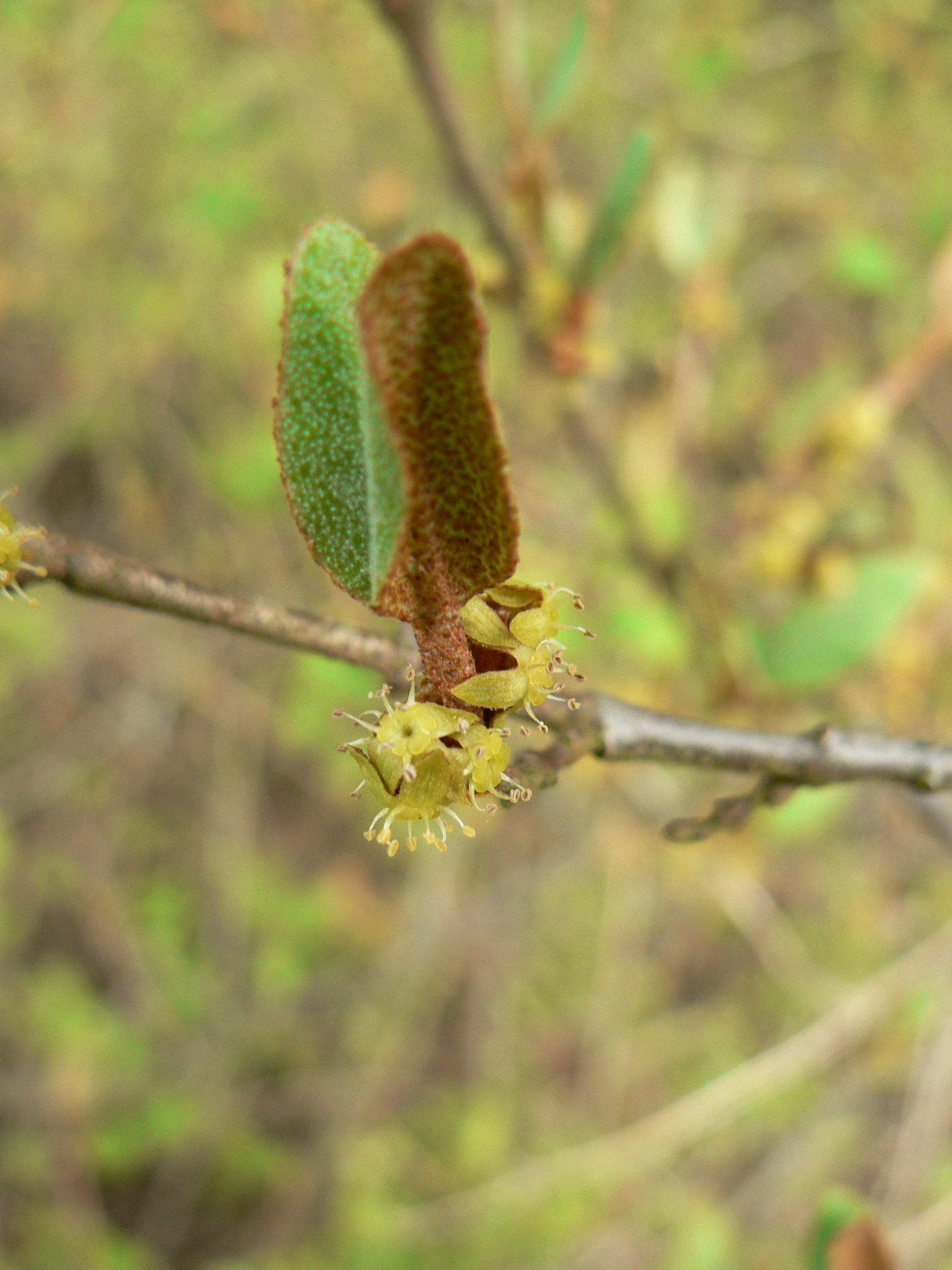
Staminate flowers of Shepherdia canadensis

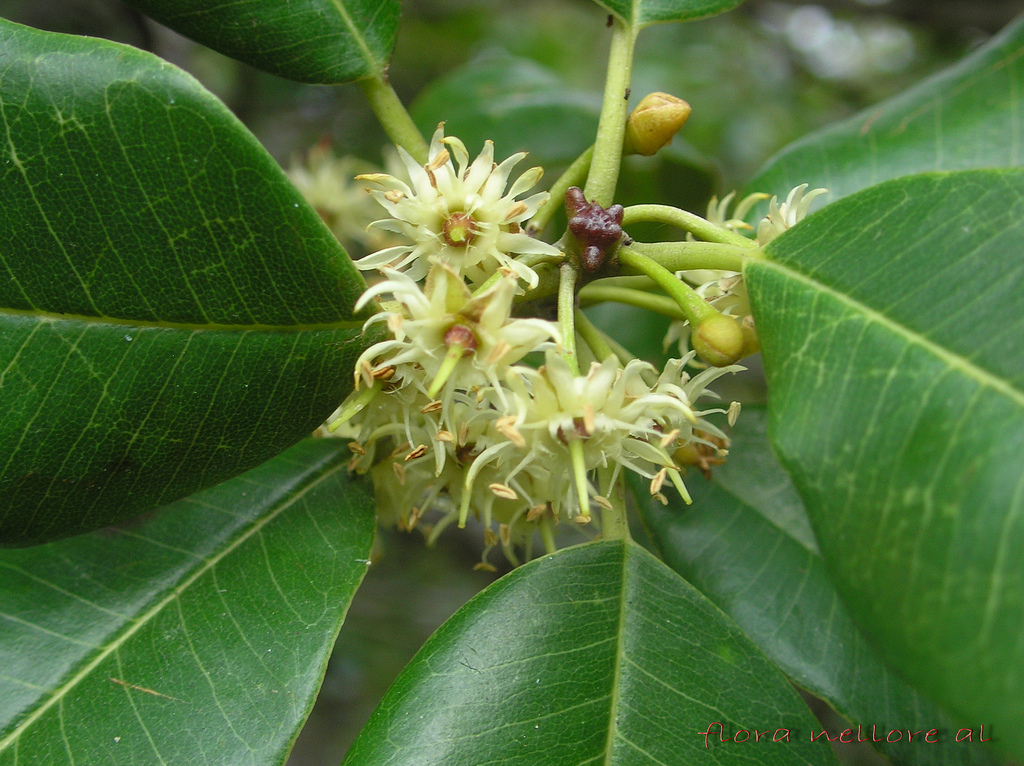
Manilkara hexandra flowers have both stamens with anthers and staminodes that have no anthers.

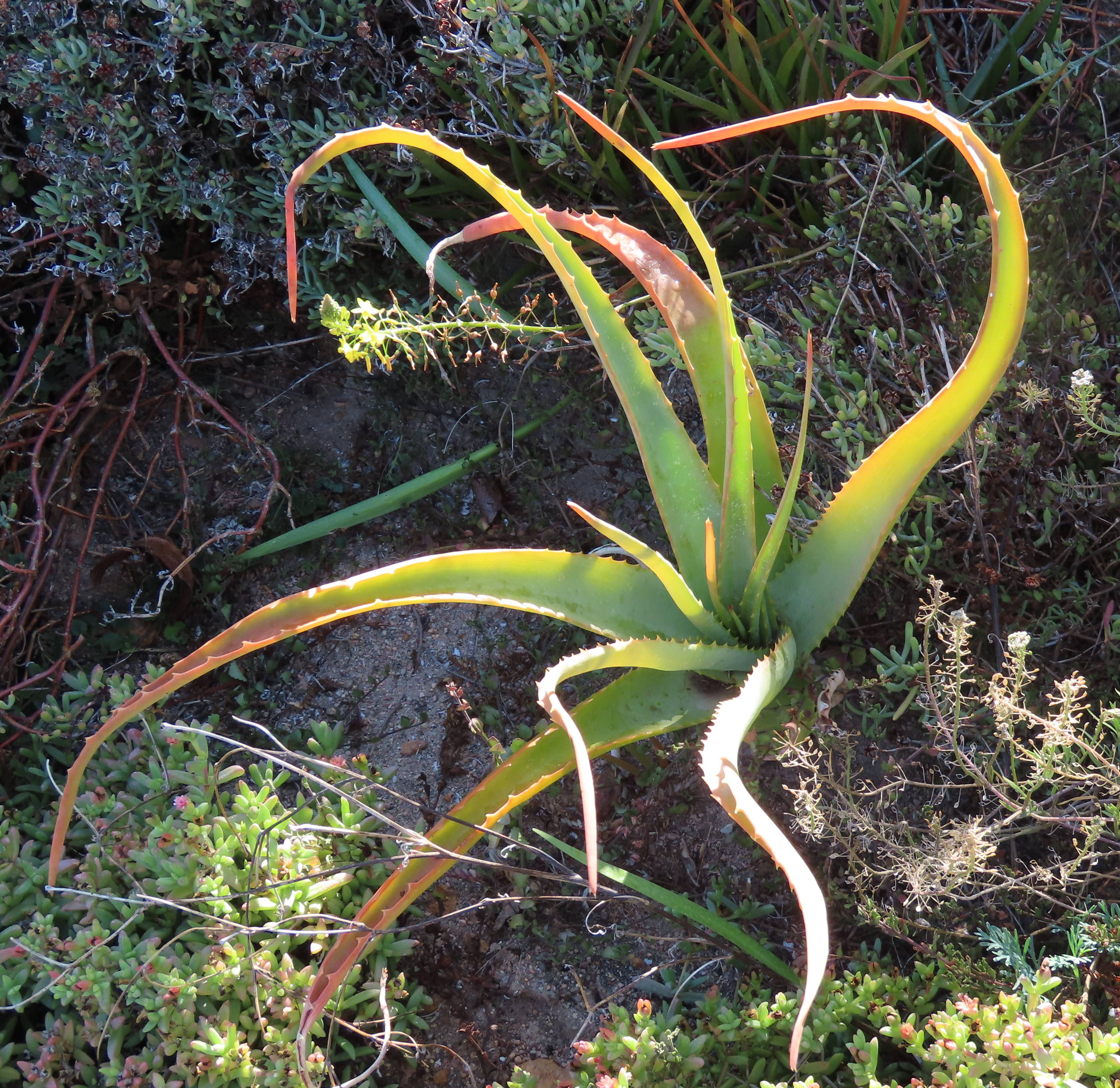
Subulate leaves are narrow with an elongated, tapering tip, as seen on this species of Aloe.

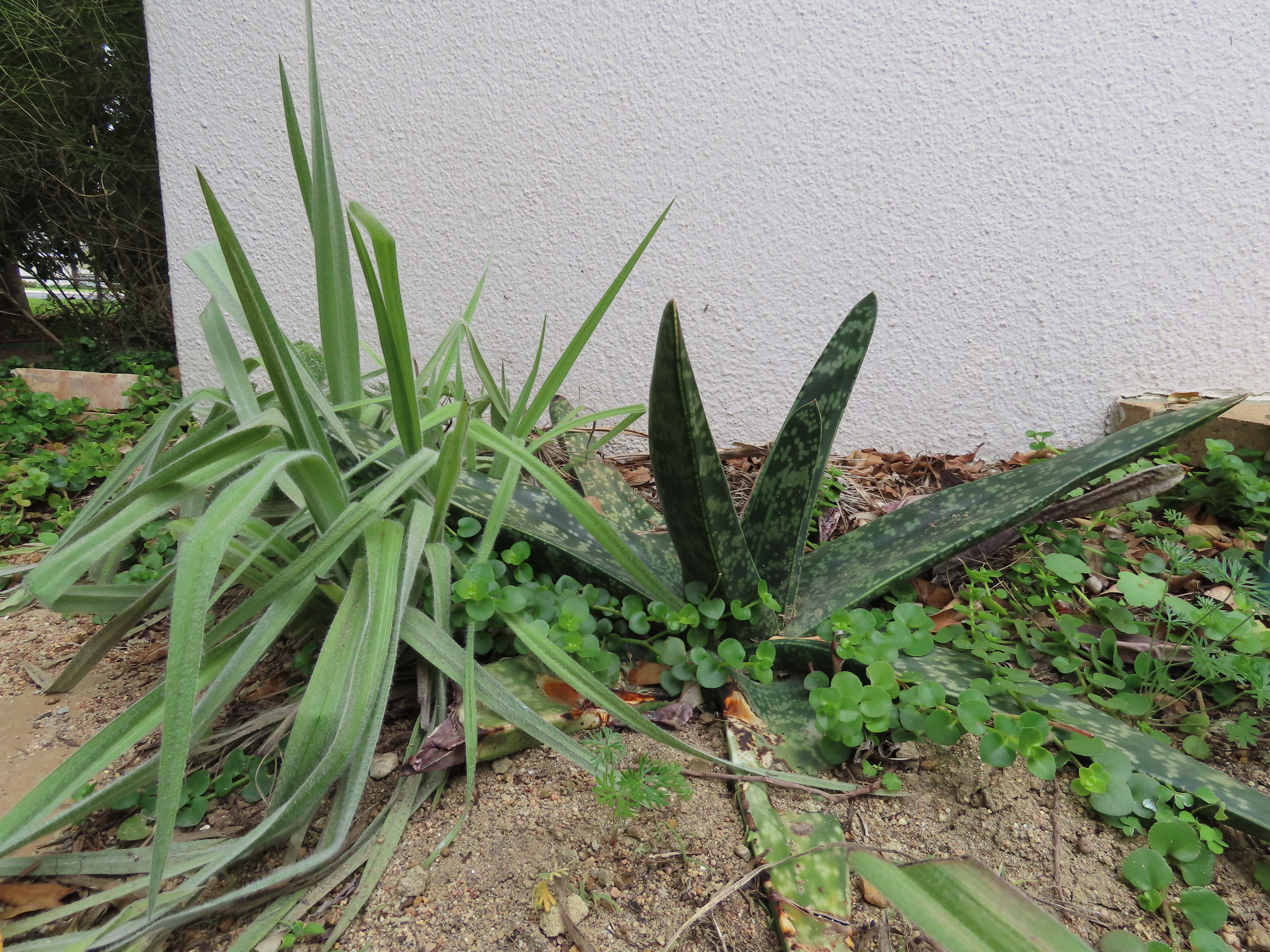
The large, succulent, acaulescent, linear, cuspidate mottled leaves of a Gasteria species and the small, succulent, cordate leaves of a Crassula species contrast with the linear, herbaceous leaves of a Hypoxis species.

saccate
Pouched or shaped like a sack.
sagittate
Shaped like the head of an arrow; narrow and pointed but gradually enlarged at the base into two straight lobes directed downward; may refer only to the base of a leaf with such lobes. Compare hastate.
salverform
Shaped like a salver - Trumpet-shaped; having a long, slender tube and a flat, abruptly expanded limb
samara
A dry, indehiscent fruit with its wall expanded into a wing, e.g. in the genus Acer.
samphire
A common name given to various edible coastal plants, such as Salicornia spp. (Amaranthaceae), Crithmum maritimum (Apiaceae) and Limbarda crithmoides (Asteraceae).
sanguine
(from Latin sanguineus) Blood-colored: crimson; the color of blood.
saprophyte

A plant, or loosely speaking, a fungus or similar organism, deriving its nourishment from decaying organic matter such as dead wood or humus, and usually lacking chlorophyll. Compare parasite, saprotroph, and epiphyte.
saprotroph

An organism deriving its nourishment from decaying organic matter. Contrast parasite and epiphyte.
sarment
A long, slender, prostrate stolon, commonly called a runner.
sarmentose
Reproducing by sarments; strawberry plants are the most familiar example.
saxicolous
Growing on stone, like some lichens.
scabrid

Rough to the touch, with short hard protrusions or hairs.
scalariform
Ladder-like in structure or appearance.
scale
1. A reduced or rudimentary leaf, for example around a dormant bud.
2. A flattened epidermal outgrowth, such as those commonly found on the leaves and rhizomes of ferns.
scandent
Climbing, by whatever means. See also: scandent in Wiktionary.
scape

Usages vary, e.g.: a leafless peduncle arising directly from the ground, or a stem-like flowering stalk of a plant with radical leaves.
scapose
Having the floral axis more or less erect with few or no leaves; consisting of a scape.
scarious
Dry and membranous.
schizocarp
A dry fruit formed from more than one carpel but breaking apart into individual carpels (mericarp) when ripe. For illustration, see mericarp
scion
The aerial part of a graft combination, induced by various means to unite with a compatible understock or rootstock.
sclereid
A cell with a thick, lignified, cell wall that is shorter than a fiber cell and dies soon after the thickening of its cell wall.
sclerenchyma
A strengthening or supporting tissue composed of sclereids or of a mixture of sclereids and fibers.
sclerophyll

A plant with hard, stiff leaves; any structure stiffened with thick-walled cells.
scorpioid
(of a cymose inflorescence) Branching alternately on one side and then the other. Compare helicoid.
scrobiculate
Having very small pits.
scrubland
Dense vegetation dominated by shrubs.
scurf
Minute, loose, membranous scales on the surface of some plant parts, such as leaves.
secondary metabolite
Chemicals produced by a plant that do not have a role in so-called primary functions such as growth, development, photosynthesis, reproduction, etc.
secretory tissue
The tissues concerned with the secretion of gums, resins, oils and other substances in plants.
section (sectio)
The category of supplementary taxa intermediate in rank between subgenus and series. It is a singular noun always written with a capital initial letter, in combination with the generic name.
secund
Having all the parts grouped on one side or turned to one side (applied especially to inflorescences).
sedge
A plant of the family Cyperaceae.
seed
A ripened ovule, consisting of a protective coat enclosing an embryo and food reserves; a propagating organ formed in the sexual reproductive cycle of gymnosperms and angiosperms (together, the seed plants).
segment
A part or subdivision of an organ, e.g. a petal is a segment of the corolla. A term sometimes used when the sepals and petals are indistinguishable.
self-pollination
(also selfing) The acceptance by stigmas of pollen from the same flower or from flowers on the same plant, which means they are self-compatible.
semaphyll
A structure such as a bract or sepal (if the remainder of the perianth is inconspicuous) which has become modified to attract pollinators.
semelparity
When a plant flowers once, then dies. Opposite of iteroparity
semiterete
Of a stem, more or less semicircular in cross-section: rounded on one side but flat on the other. Compare with: terete.
senecioid
See anthemoid.
sensitive
A descriptive term for stigmas that, in response to touch, close the two lobes of the stigma together, ending the receptivity of the stigma, at least for the time that the lobes are closed together. Mimulus is perhaps the best-known example.
sensu
In the sense of.
sensu auct.
(of a plant group or name) As cited by a named authority.
sensu amplo
(of a plant group or name) In a generous or ample sense.
sensu lato
(of a plant group) In a broad sense.
sensu strictissimo
(of a plant group) In the narrowest sense.
sensu stricto
(of a plant group) In a narrow sense.
sepal
In a flower, one of the segments or divisions of the outer whorl of non-fertile parts surrounding the fertile organs; usually green. Compare petal, tepal.
septicidal
(of a fruit) Dehiscing along the partitions between loculi. Compare loculicidal.
septum

A partition, e.g. the membranous wall separating the two valves of the pod of Brassicaceae.
seriate
Arranged in rows.
sericeous
Silky with dense appressed hairs.
series
The category of supplementary taxa intermediate in rank between section and species. It is often used as a plural adjective, as in "Primula subgenus Primula sect. Primula series Acaules".
serrate
Toothed with asymmetrical teeth pointing forward; like the cutting edge of a saw.
serrulate
Finely serrate.
sessile
Attached without a stalk, e.g. of a leaf without a petiole or a stigma, when the style is absent.
seta

A bristle or stiff hair (in Bryophytes, the stalk of the sporophyte). A terminal seta is an appendage to the tip of an organ, e.g. the primary rachis of a bipinnate leaf in Acacia.
sheath
A tubular or rolled part of an organ, e.g. the lower part of the leaf in most grasses.
sheathing
When the rolled or tubular part of a plant contains another it is described as sheathing.
shoot
The aerial part of a plant; a stem and all of its dependent parts (leaves, flowers, etc.).
shrub
A woody perennial plant without a single main trunk, branching freely, and generally smaller than a tree.
sigmoid
Shaped like the letter 'S'.
silicula or silicle
A fruit like a siliqua, but stouter, not more than twice as long as wide.
silique
siliqua
A dry, dehiscent fruit (in contrast to a silicula, more than twice as long as wide) formed from a superior ovary of two carpels, with two parietal placentas and divided into two loculi by a 'false' septum.
silky
Densely covered with fine, soft, straight, appressed hairs, with a lustrous sheen and satiny to the touch.
silviculture
The science of forestry and the cultivation of woodlands for commercial purposes and wildlife conservation.
simple
Undivided or unsegmented, e.g. a leaf not divided into leaflets (note, however, that a simple leaf may still be entire, toothed or lobed) or an unbranched hair or inflorescence.
sinuate
Having deep, wave-like depressions along the margins, but more or less flat. Compare undulate.
sinus
A notch or depression between two lobes or teeth in the margin of an organ.
solitary
Single, of flowers that grow one plant per year, one in each axil, or widely separated on the plant; not grouped in an inflorescence.
sorus

A cluster of sporangia. Sori typically occur in ferns, some Algae and some fungi. In many fern species the sorus is covered by a protective indusium.
sp.
An abbreviation of species (singular), often used when the genus is known but the species has not been determined, as in "Brassica sp." See spp..
spp.
An abbreviation of species (plural), often used to collectively refer to more than one species of the same genus, as in "Astragalus spp." See sp..
spadix
A spicate (spike-like) inflorescence with the flowers crowded densely, even solidly, around a stout, often succulent axis. Particularly typical of the family Araceae
spathe

A large bract ensheathing an inflorescence. Traditionally any broad, flat blade.
spathulate or spatulate
Spoon-shaped; broad at the tip with a narrowed projection extending to the base.
species
A group, or populations of individuals, sharing common features and/or ancestry, generally the smallest group that can be readily and consistently recognized; often, a group of individuals capable of interbreeding and producing fertile offspring. The basic unit of classification, the category of taxa of the lowest principal rank in the nomenclatural hierarchy. Strict assignment to a species is not always possible, as it is subject to particular contexts, and the species concept under consideration.
specific epithet
Follows the name of the genus, and is the second word of a botanical binomial. The generic name and specific epithet together constitute the name of a species, i.e. the specific epithet is not the species name.
speirochoric
Unintentional introduction by seeds. Compare agochoric.
spica

Another name for a spike.
spike

An unbranched, indeterminate inflorescence in which the flowers are without stalks. Compare raceme.
spikelet
A subunit of a spike inflorescence, especially in grasses, sedges, and some other monocotyledons, consisting of one to many flowers and associated bracts or glumes.
spine

A stiff, sharp structure formed by the modification of a plant organ that contains vascular tissue, e.g. a lateral branch or a stipule; includes thorns.
spinescent
Ending in a spine; modified to form a spine.
spiral
Of arrangement, when plant parts are arranged in a succession of curves like the thread of a screw, or coiled in a cylindrical or conical manner.
splash-cup (sporangia)
A cup-like structure in fungi such as Nidulariaceae and in cryptogams such as some mosses. The cups function in spore dispersal, in which the energy of raindrops falling into the cup causes the water to splash outward carrying the spores.
sporangium (sporangia)
A structure in which spores are formed and from which the mature spores are released
sporangiophore
An organ bearing sporangia, e.g. the cones of Equisetum.
spore
A haploid propagule, produced by meiosis in diploid cells of a sporophyte that can germinate to produce a multicellular gametophyte.
sporocarp
A fruiting body containing spores.
sporophyll
In pteridophytes, a modified leaf that bears a sporangium or sporangia.
sporophyte
The diploid multicellular phase in the alternation of generations of plants and algae that produces the spores. Compare gametophyte.
sport
A naturally occurring variant of a species, not usually present in a population or group of plants; a plant that has spontaneously mutated so that it differs from its parent plant.
spreading
Extending horizontally, e.g. in branches. Standing out at right angles to an axis, e.g. in leaves or hairs.
spur
1. a short shoot.
2. a conical or tubular outgrowth from the base of a perianth segment, often containing nectar.
squamula

A small scale.
squamule
A small scale.
squamulose
Covered with small scales (squamules).
squarrose
Having tips of leaves, stems, etc. radiating or projecting outward, e.g. in the moss Rhytidiadelphus squarrosus.
s.t.
An abbreviation for "sometimes". Compare usu. and oft..
stalk
The supporting structure of an organ, usually narrower in diameter than the organ itself.
stamen

The male organ of a flower, consisting (usually) of a stalk called the filament and a pollen-bearing head called the anther.
staminate flower

A flower with stamens but no pistil.
staminode
A sterile stamen, often rudimentary, sometimes petal-like. Commonly has a function in attracting pollinators that feed on the staminodes.
staminophore
A structure, around the apex of eucalypt, myrtaceae hypanthia, that supports the stamens.
standard
The large posterior petal of pea-flowers.
standard specimen
A representative specimen of a cultivar or other taxon which demonstrates how the name of that taxon should be used.
stele
The primary vascular system (including phloem, xylem, and ground tissue) of plant stems and roots.
stellate
Star-shaped.
stem
The plant axis, either aerial or subterranean, which bears nodes, leaves, branches, and flowers.
stem-clasping
See amplexicaul.
stenospermocarpy
The development or production of fruit that is seedless or has minute seeds because of the abortion of seed development. Compare parthenocarpy.
sterile
Infertile, as with a stamen that does not bear pollen or a flower that does not bear seed.
stigma
The pollen-receptive surface of a carpel or group of fused carpels, usually sticky; usually a point or small head at the summit of the style.
stilt root
A descending root growing from the trunk above ground and sometimes featuring lenticels; characteristic of e.g. Rhizophora.
stipe
Generally a small stalk or stalk-like structure. The stalk of a frond of a fern; the stalk supporting the pileus of a mushroom; the stalk of a seaweed such as a kelp; the stalk-like support of a gynaecium, a pollinium, or a carpel
stipella

One of two small secondary stipules at the base of leaflets in some species.
stipitate
stalked; borne on a stipe; of an ovary, borne on a gynophore.
stipulate
Bearing stipules.
stipule
A small appendage at the bases of leaves in many dicotyledons.
stock
See rootstock.
stolon

A slender, prostrate or trailing stem, producing roots and sometimes erect shoots at its nodes. See also rhizome.
stoloniferous
Having stolons.
stoma

A pore or small hole in the surface of a leaf (or other aerial organ) allowing the exchange of gases between tissues and the atmosphere.
stone cell
a sclereid cell, such as the cells that form the tissue of nut shells and the stones of drupes.
striate
Striped with parallel, longitudinal lines or ridges.
strigillose
Minutely strigose.
strigose
Covered with appressed, straight, rigid, bristle-like hairs; the appressed equivalent of hispid.
strobilus

A cone-like structure consisting of sporophylls (e.g. conifers and club mosses) or sporangiophores (e.g. in Equisetopsida) borne close together on an axis.
style
An elongated part of a carpel or a group of fused carpels between the ovary and the stigma.
stylodium
An elongate stigma that resembles a style; a false style, e.g. commonly found in the Poaceae and Asteraceae.
stylopodium
A swelling on top of the ovary, at the base of the styles commonly found in flowers of the Apiaceae.
stylulus
The elongated apex of a free carpel which functions like the style of a syncarpous ovary, allowing pollen tubes from its stigma to enter the locule of only that carpel.
subacute
Having a tapered but not sharply pointed form; moderately acute. See also acute.
subcoriaceous
Slightly leathery or coriaceous.
subgenus
A category of supplementary taxa intermediate between genus and section. The name of a subgenus is a singular noun, always has a capital initial letter and is used in combination with the generic name, e.g. Primula subgenus Primula.
subglobose
Inflated, but less than spherical. See also globose.
suborbicular
Nearly orbicular, flat and almost circular in outline. See also orbicular.
subpetiolate
(of a leaf) Having an extremely short petiole, and may appear sessile.
subquadrangular
Not quite square. Compare quadrangular.
subshrub

A small shrub which may have partially herbaceous stems, but generally a woody plant less than 1 metre (3.3 ft) high.
subspecies
A taxonomic category within a species, usually used for geographically isolated or morphologically distinct populations of the same species. Its taxonomic rank occurs between species and variety.
subtend
To stand beneath or close to, as in a bract at the base of a flower.
subulate
Narrow and tapering gradually to a fine point.
succulent
1. Juicy or fleshy.
2. A plant with a fleshy habit.
sucker
A shoot of more or less subterranean origin; an erect shoot originating from a bud on a root or a rhizome, sometimes at some distance from the stem of the plant.
suffruticose
Having a woody base, but herbaceous higher up.
suffrutex

A subshrub or undershrub.
sulcate
Furrowed; grooved. May be single (monosulcate), two (bisulcate) or many (polysulcate).
superficial
On the surface.
superior ovary
An ovary borne above the level of attachment of the other floral parts, or above the base of a hypanthium. Compare inferior ovary and half-inferior ovary.
suspended
Of an ovule, when attached slightly below the summit of the ovary. Compare pendulous.
suture
A junction or seam of union. See fissure and commissure.
sward
Extensive, more or less even cover of a surface, e.g. a lawn grass. Compare tussock.
sympatric
Having more or less similar or overlapping ranges of distribution.
sympodial
A mode of growth in which the main axis is repeatedly terminated and replaced with a lateral branch. Examples occur in the family Combretaceae, including the genera Terminalia and Combretum. Compare monopodial.
syconium
A hollow infructescence containing multiple fruit, such as that of a fig.
syn-

A prefix meaning "with, together".
symmetrical
Capable of being divided into at least two equal, mirror-image halves (e.g. zygomorphic) or having rotational symmetry (e.g. regular or actinomorphic). Compare irregular and asymmetrical.
sympetalous
Having united (connate or fused) petals, not free (apopetalous). See also syntepalous (having fused tepals).
symphyllous
a single perianth-whorl of united segments. Compare gamophyllous (synonym), apophyllous, and polyphyllous.
synangium
A fused aggregate of sporangia, e.g. in the trilocular sporangia of the whisk fern Psilotum.
synanthous
A type of growth in which new leaves and flowers appear and die back at the same time. See also hysteranthous and proteranthous.
synaptospermy
The dispersal of diaspores as units, where each bears more than one seed, for example where each diaspore comprises an entire inflorescence, as in Brunsvigia or multi-seeded fruit as in Tribulus zeyheri. Ephemeral synaptospermy is the term for when the diaspores split into units containing fewer or single seeds each, as in most tumbleweeds. True synaptospermy is when the diaspore generally remains entire until germination, as commonly happens in species of Grielum.
syncarpous
(of a gynoecium) Composed of united carpels.
synonym
An outdated or 'alternative' name for the same taxon.
synoecious
A synonym of bisexual.
syntepalous
Having fused tepals. See also sympetalous (having fused petals).
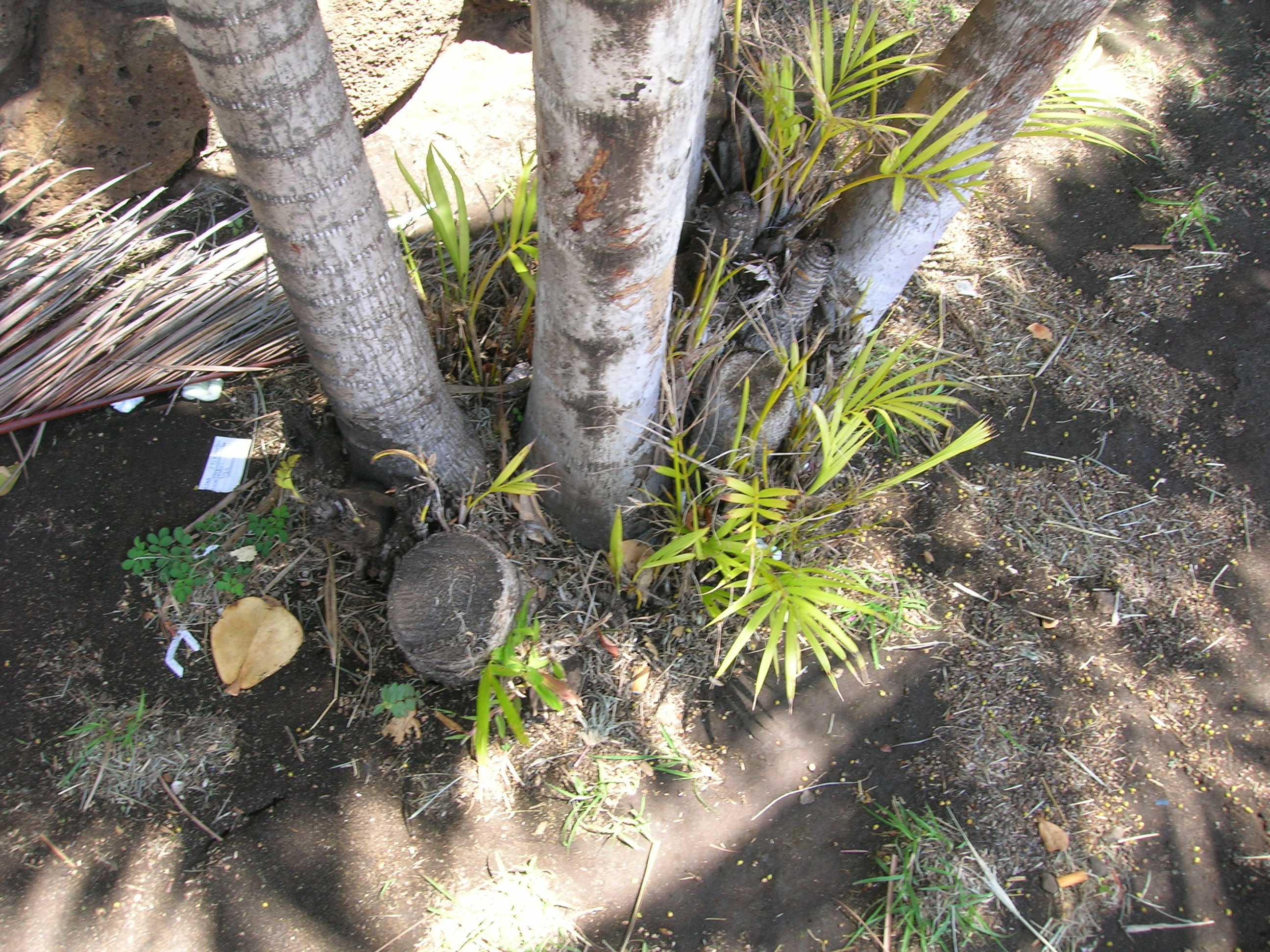
Suckers around the trunk of Dypsis lutescens

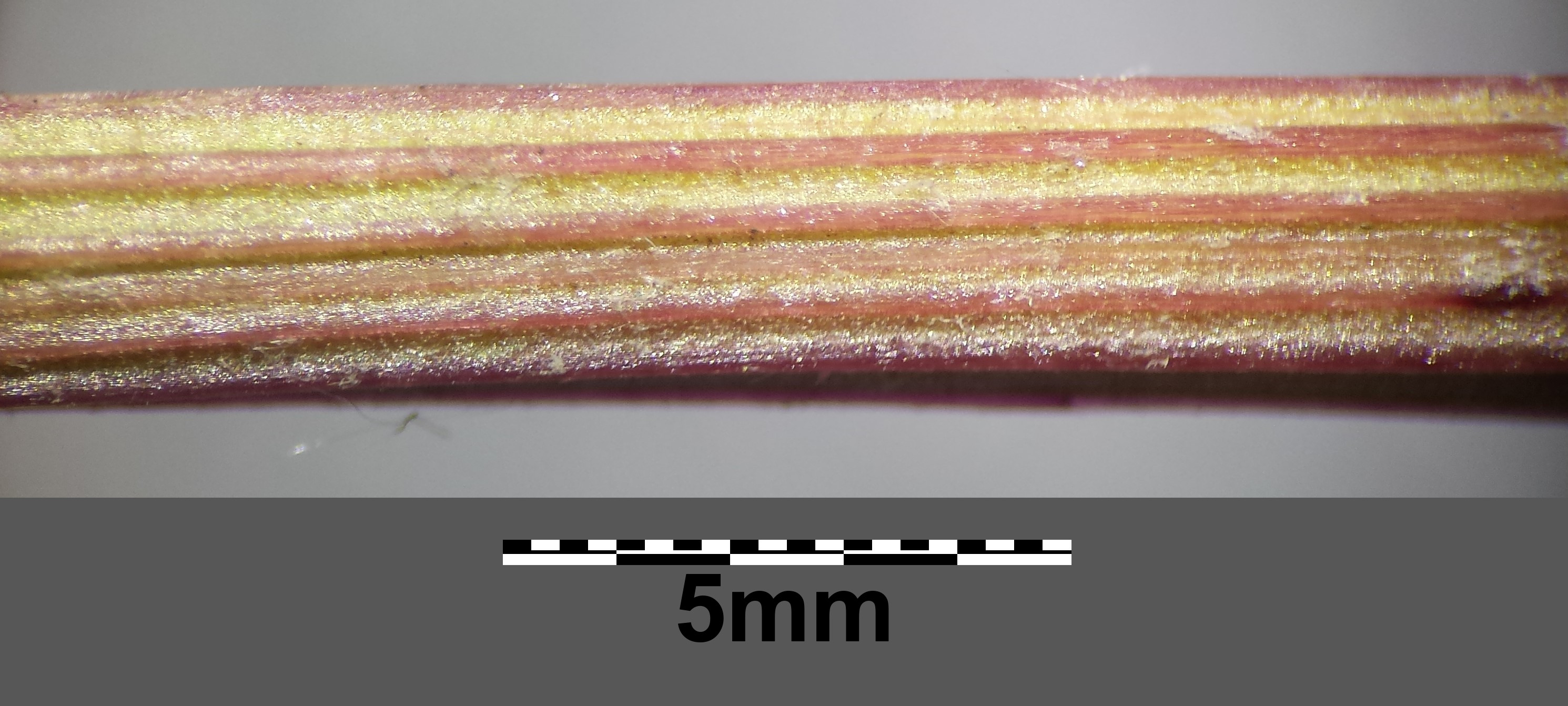
Sulcate (specifically polysulcate) grooves along the stem of Scorzonera cana

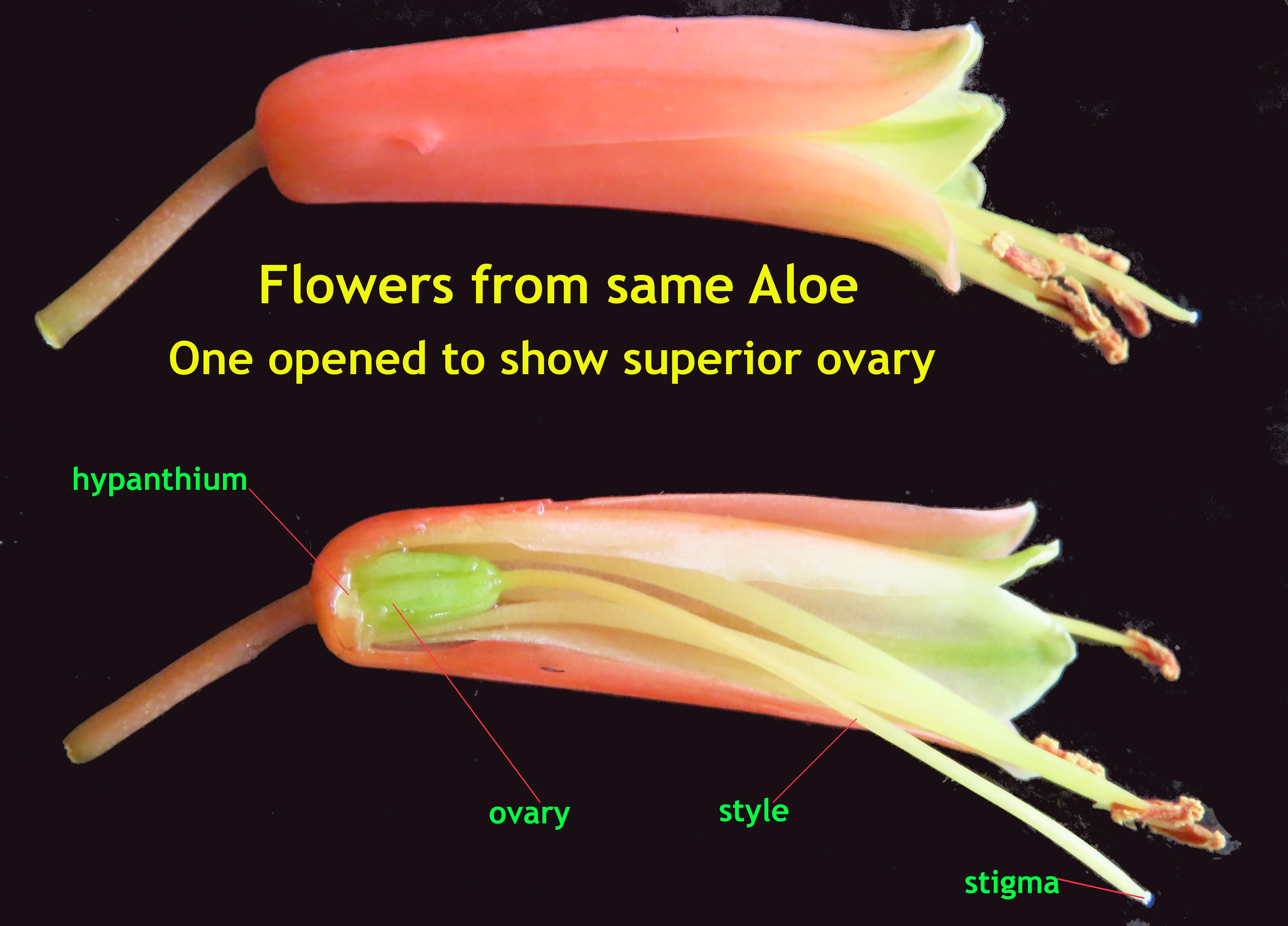
Superior ovary ovary in an Aloe species. One flower is sectioned to display the pistil and hypanthium.

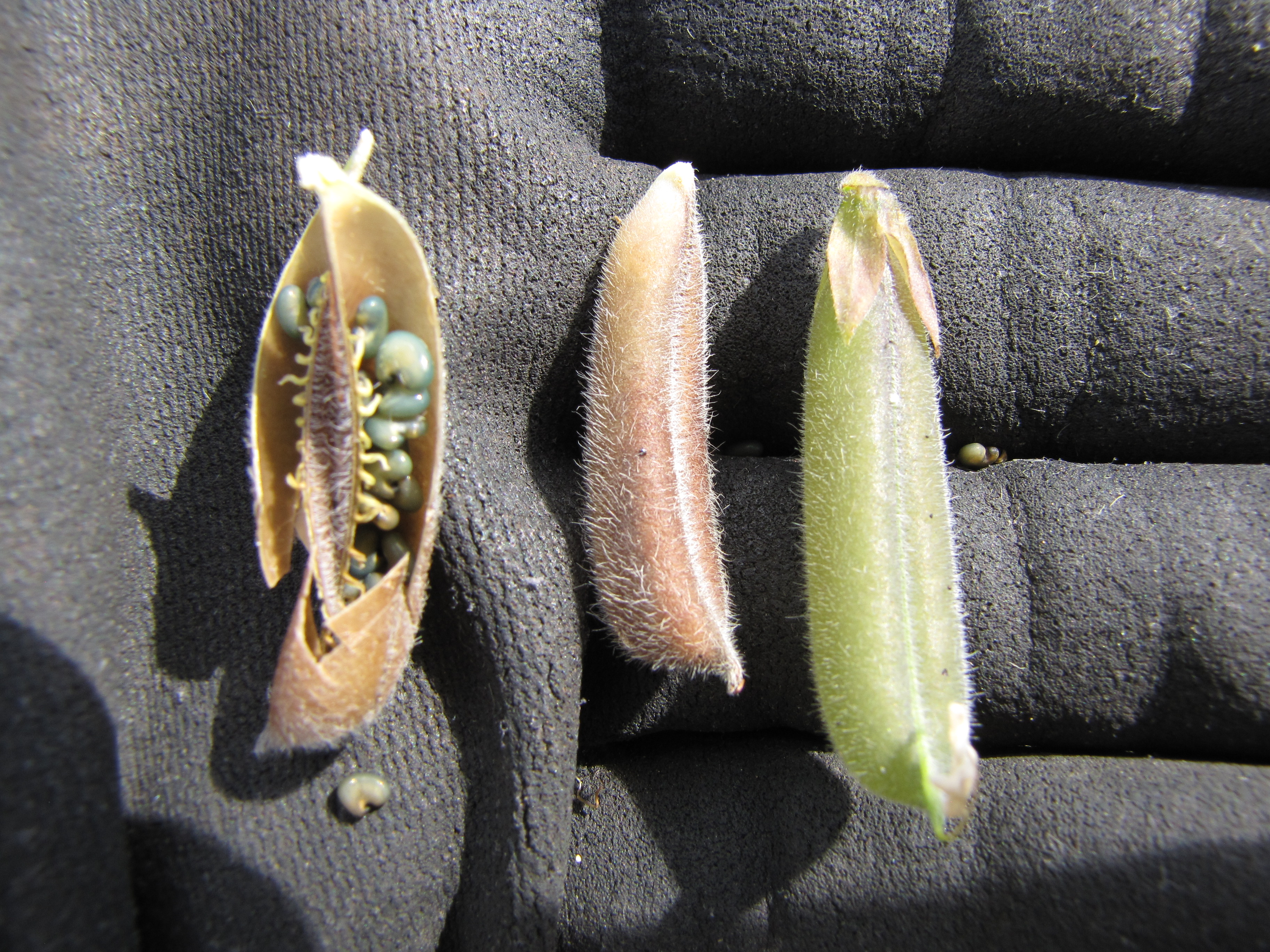
The suture along the concave curve of the pod of a Crotalaria incana, along which the seeds are attached, is where the single carpel has folded shut.

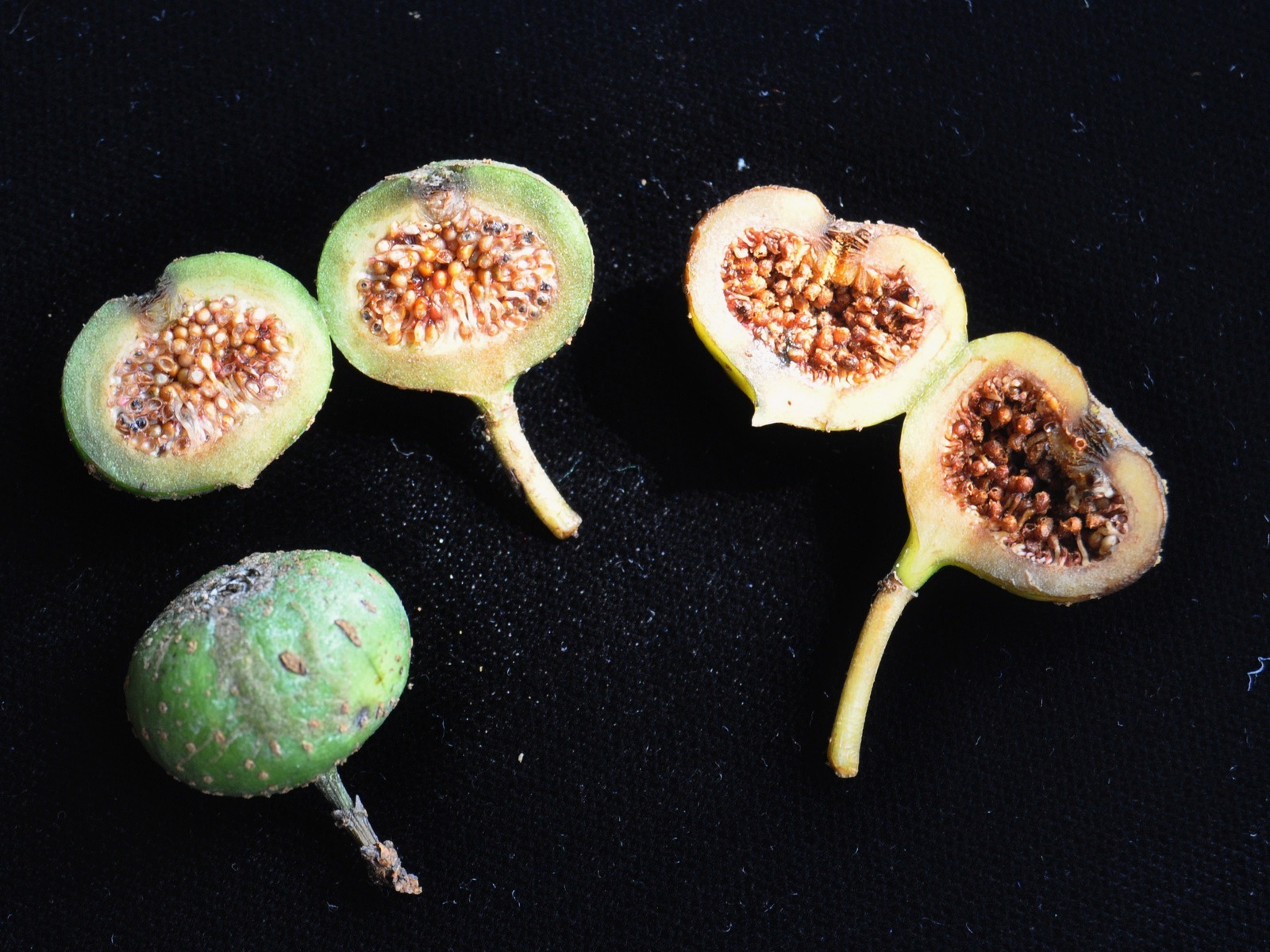
An undamaged syconium of a Ficus species, plus two more cut open longitudinally to display the fruit within

== T ==
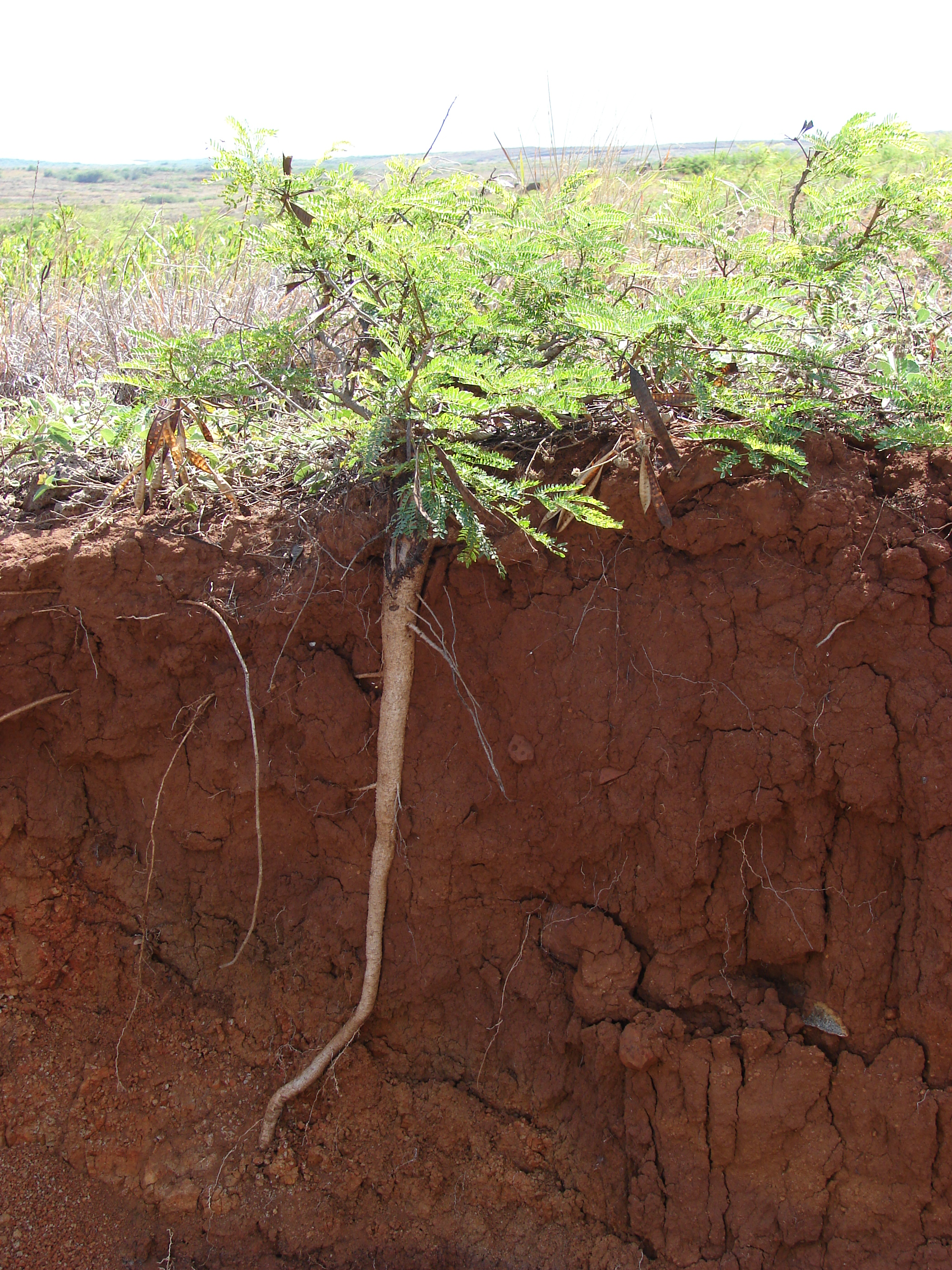
Leucaena leucocephala taproot exposed in a roadcut

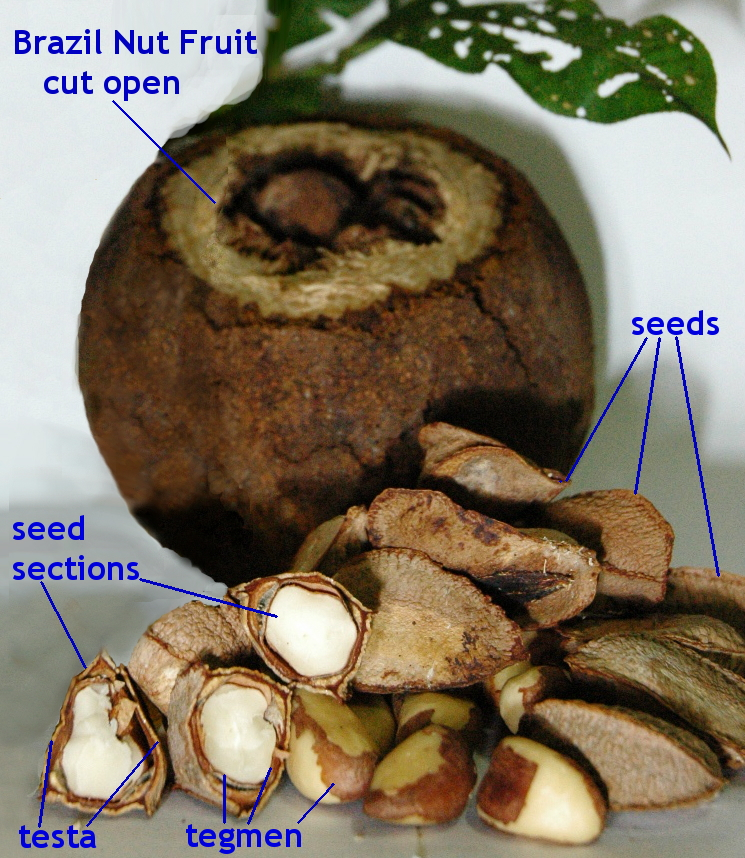
Cross sections of Brazil nut seeds, showing the tegmen and testa

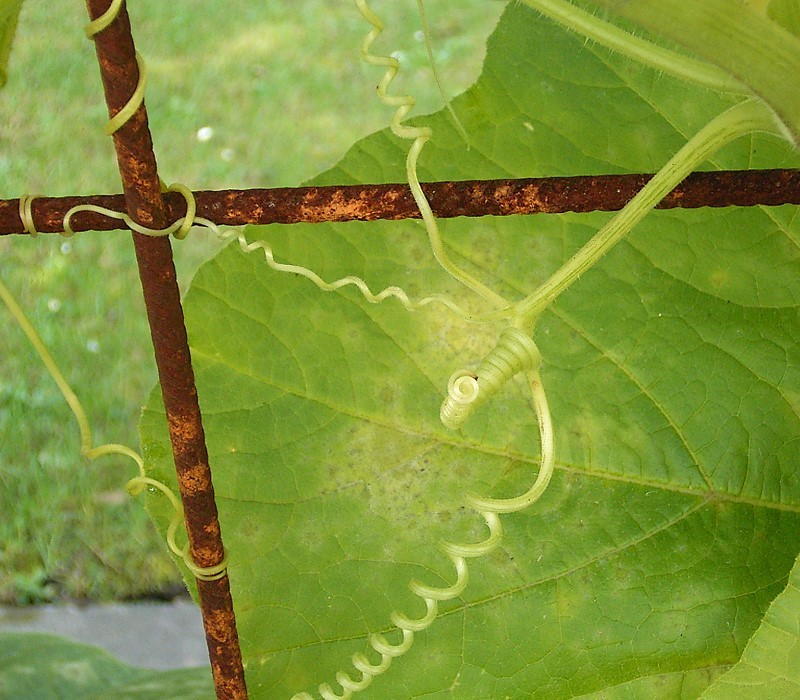
Tendrils of Cucurbita pepo, some supporting the stem on the frame, some failing to find a point of attachment

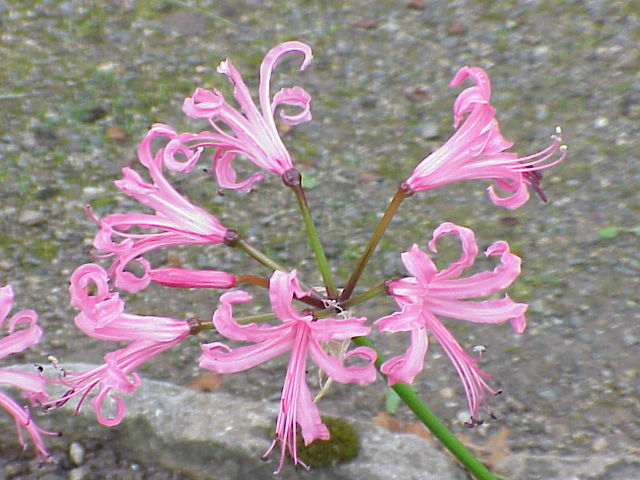
Nerine bowdenii, showing the lack of visible sepals, and the inferior ovaries. The sepals are incorporated into the corolla as tepals.

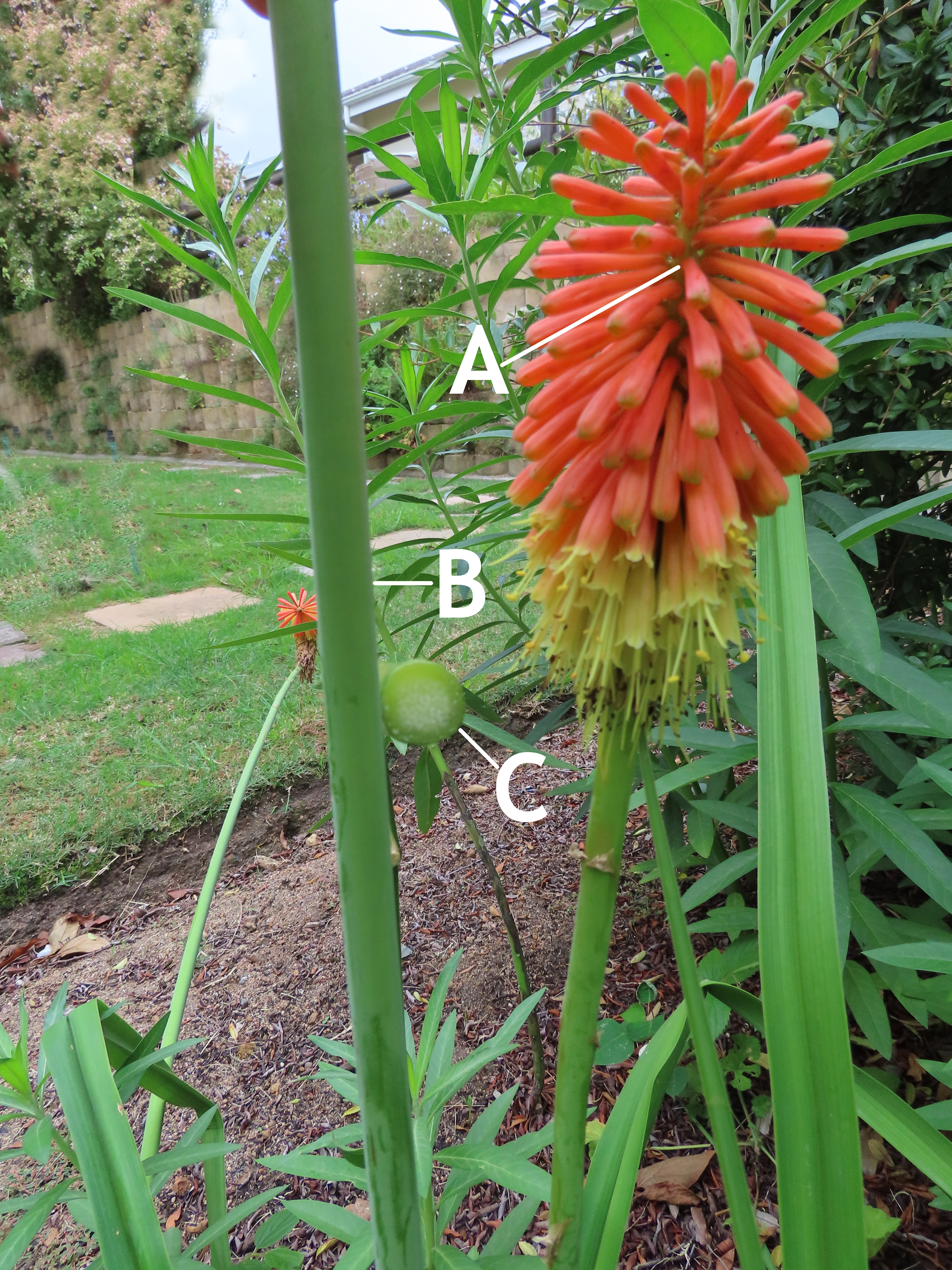
Terete raceme of Kniphofia shown together with a cross section of a peduncle. A: Inflorescence; B: Terete peduncle; C: Cross section of a terete peduncle

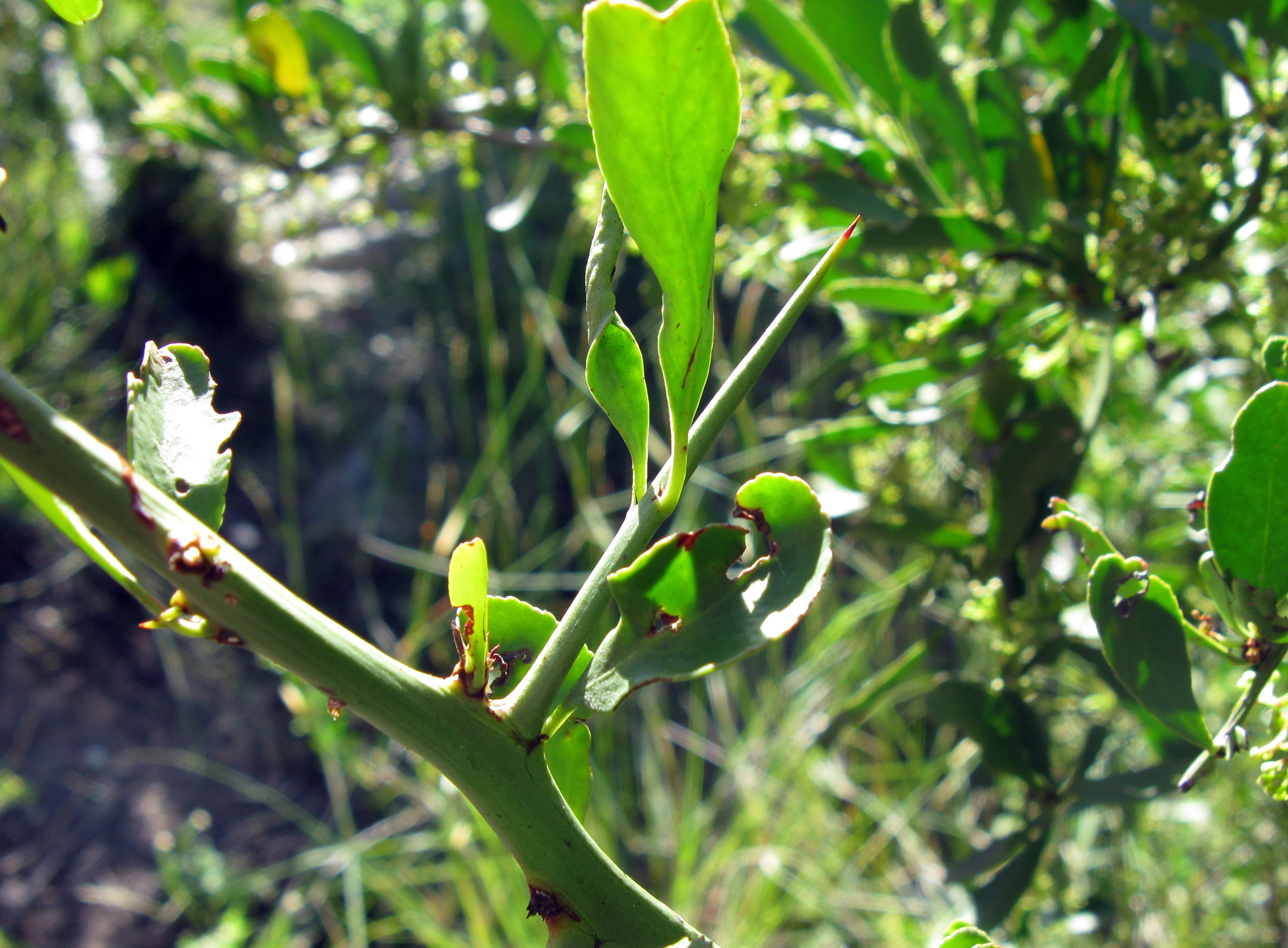
Gymnosporia buxifolia has true thorns, that is, modified branches. In some species such branches are complete with buds and leaves.

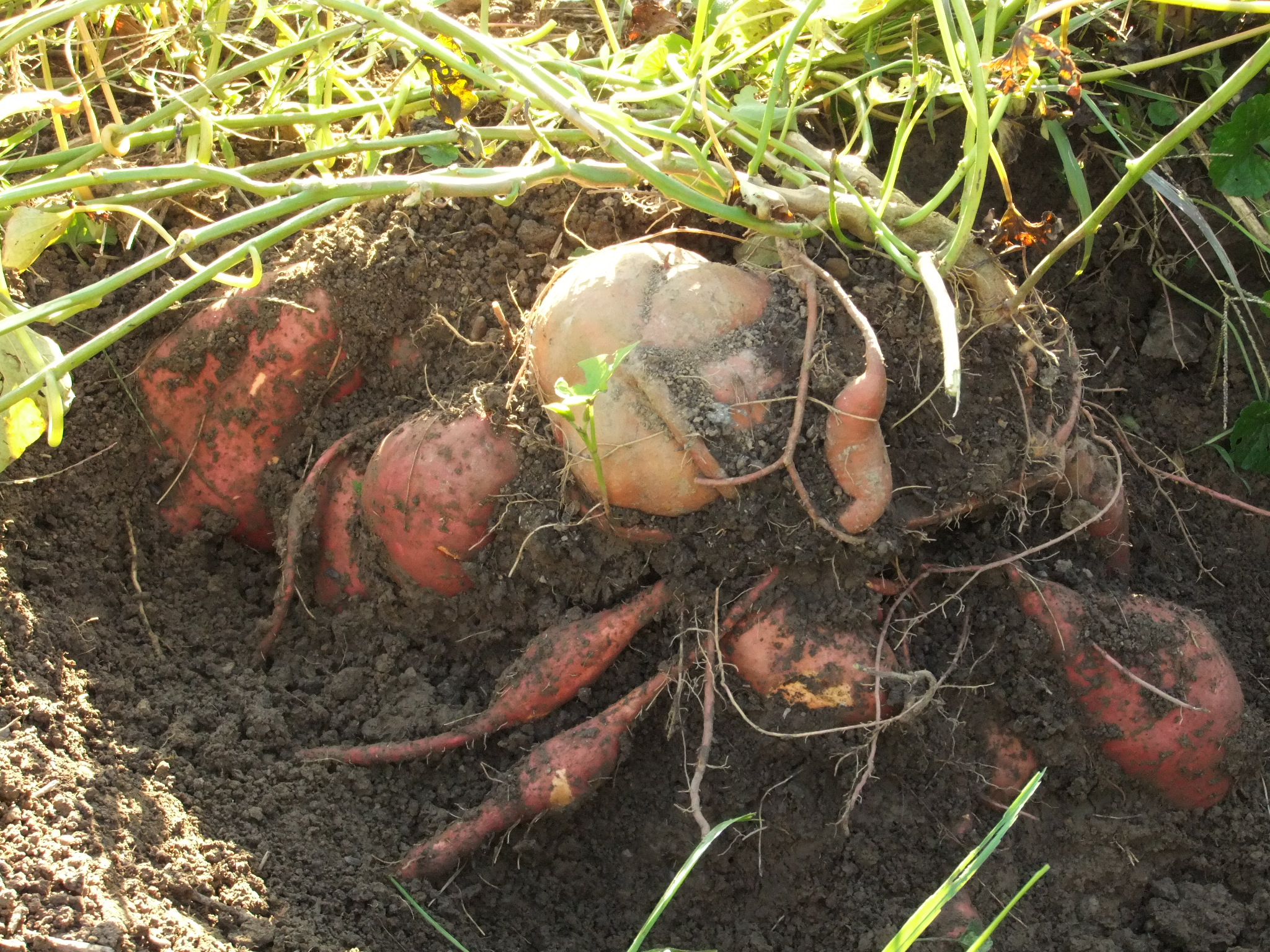
Sweet potato tubers exposed, showing them to be root tubers. Morphologically, they differ from stem tubers of potatoes, for example, in that root tubers do not have nodes that bear buds. The root tubers of some species of plants, however, can produce adventitious buds for vegetative reproduction.

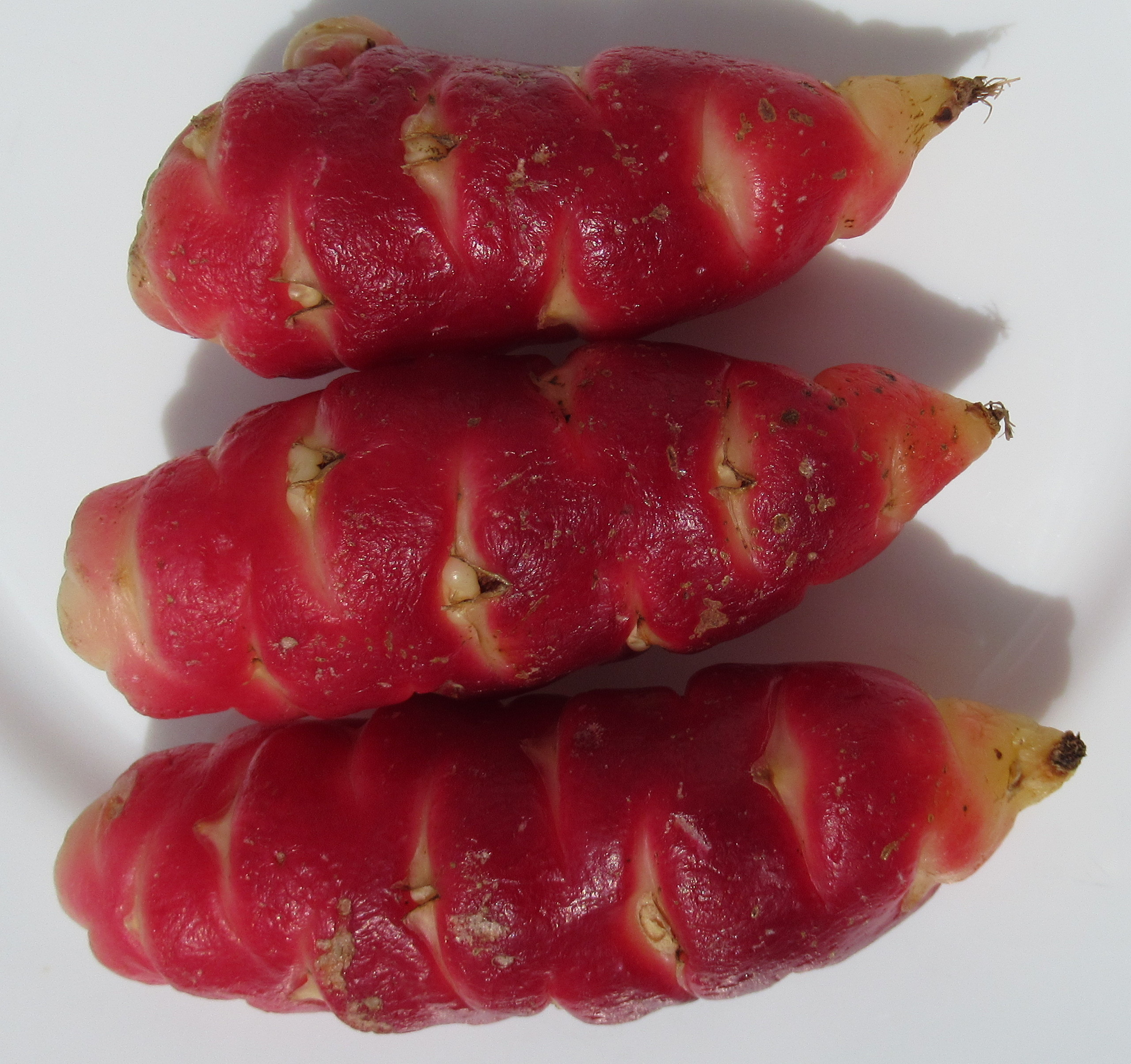
Oxalis tuberosa, a stem tuber

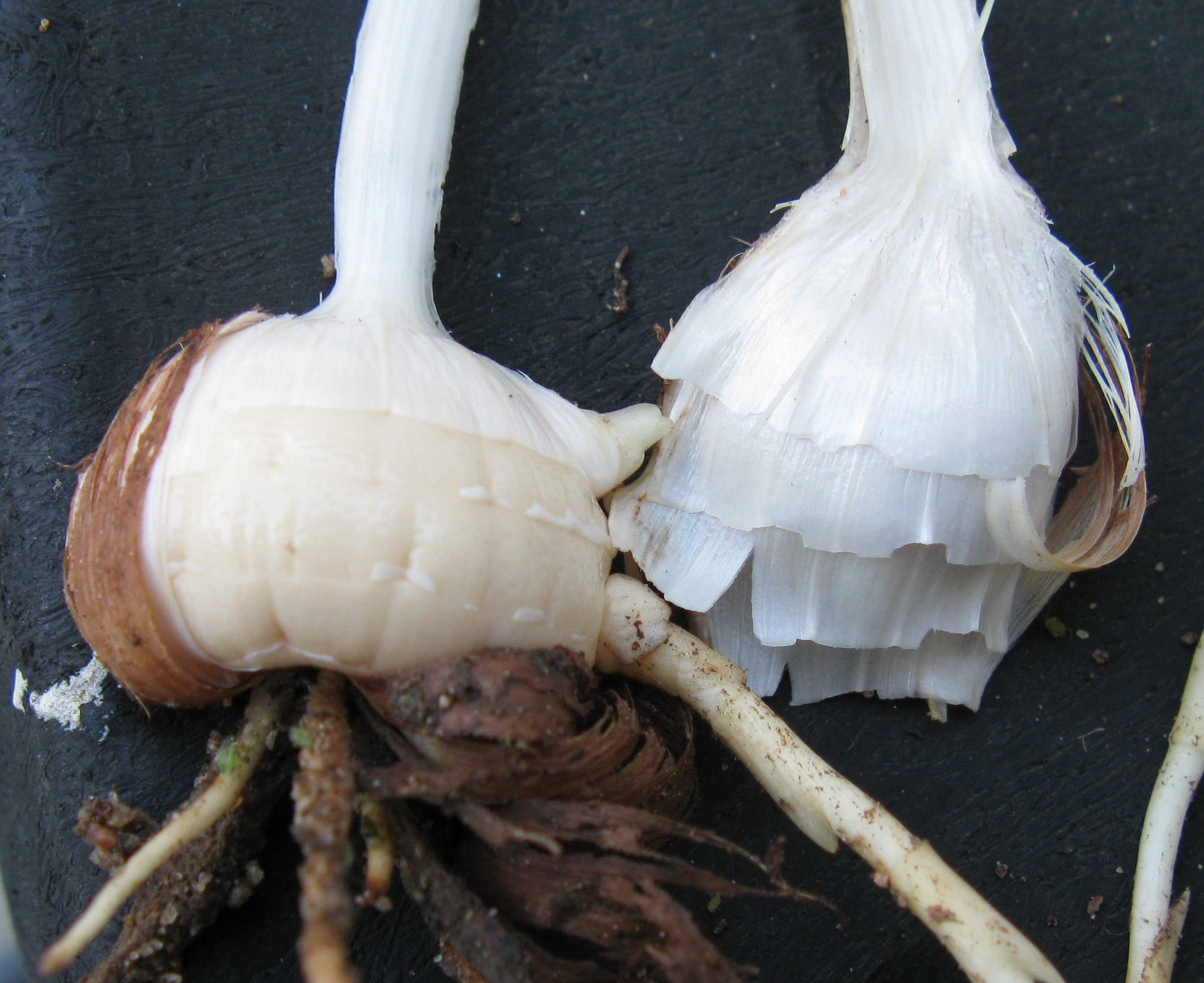
Corms of Crocosmia bear typical tunics formed of cataphylls growing from the nodes of the corm. The illustration shows still-living cataphylls as white tissue, whereas the functional, hard, resistant tunic is brown.

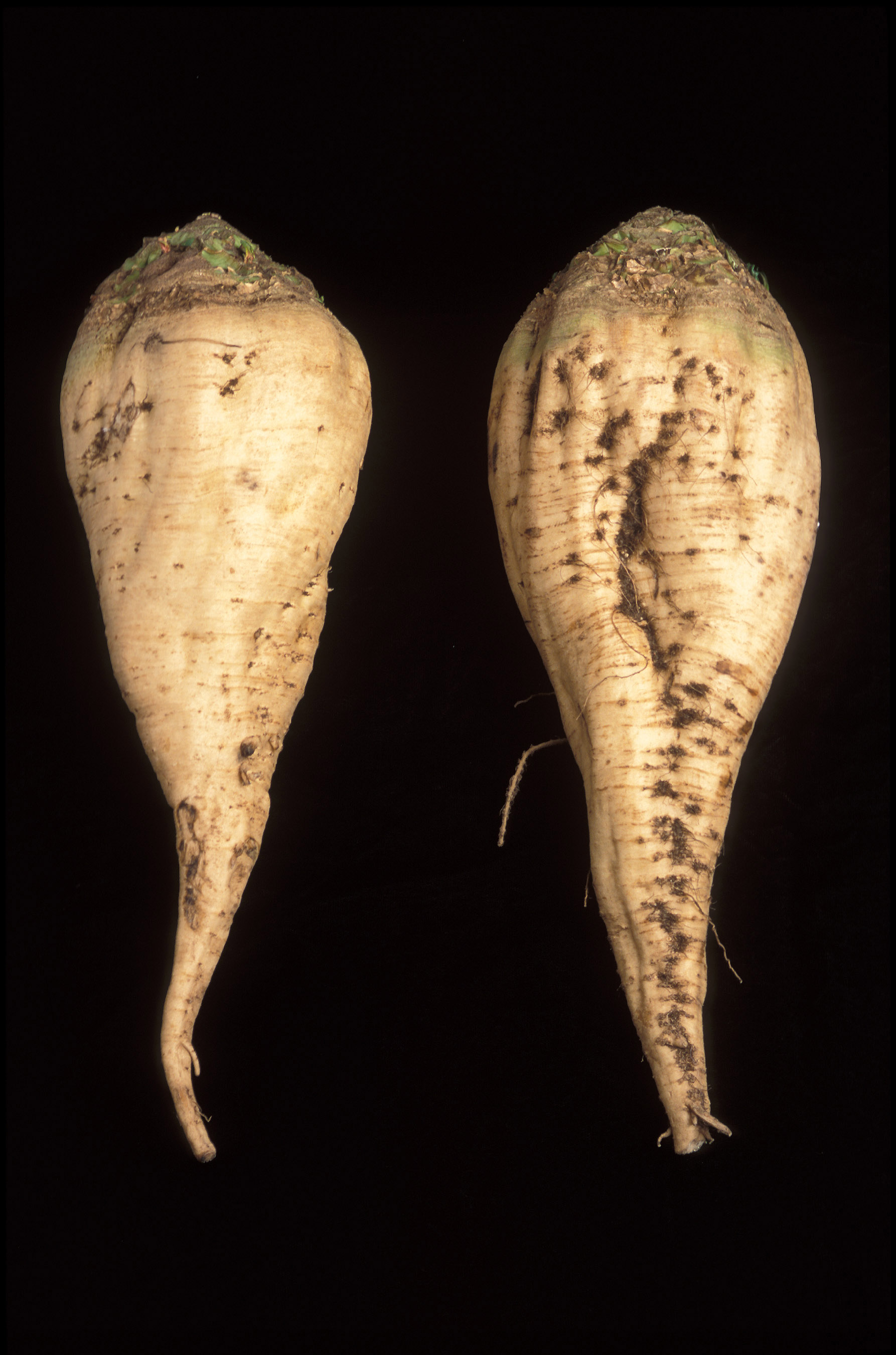
Turbinate (spinning top-shaped) roots of sugar beet

taproot
The primary descending root of a plant with a single dominant root axis.
tartareous
Having a surface that is coarse, thick, rough, and crumbling.
taxon

A group or category in a system of biological classification.
taxonomy
The study of the principles and practice of classification.
tegmen
The inner layer of the testa (seed coat). It develops from the inner integument of the ovule.
tendril
Any slender organ modified from a stem, leaf, leaflet, or stipule and used by climbing plants to cling to an object.
tepal
A segment of a perianth, either sepal or petal; usually used when all perianth segments are indistinguishable in appearance.
terete

Circular in cross-section; more or less cylindrical without grooves or ridges.
terminal
Situated at the tip or apex.
ternate
In groups of three; of leaves, arranged in whorls of three; of a single leaf, having the leaflets arranged in groups of three.
terrestrial
Of or on the ground; of a habitat, on land as opposed to in water (aquatic), on rocks (lithophytic), or on other plants (epiphytic).
tessellate
With cracks or fissures arranged in squares so as to give a chequered appearance. Usually applied to the appearance of the bark of a tree
testa
The seed coat.
tetrad
A group of four; usually used to refer to four pollen grains which remain fused together through maturity (e.g. in the Epacridaceae).
tetragonal
Square; having four corners; four-angled, e.g. the cross-sections of stems of herbaceous Lamiaceae.
tetramerous
In four parts, particularly with respect to flowers; four parts in each whorl. See also trimerous and pentamerous.
tetraploid
Having four complete sets of chromosomes in each sporophyte cell.
tetraspore
The asexual spore of red algae. It is so named because each sporangium produces just four spores. See Rhodophyceae.
thalamus

1. A synonym for receptacle.
2. The inflorescence disk of members of the Asteraceae.
3. A calyx, as used by Carl Linnaeus.
having a thallus-like structure; in the form of a thallus; thalloid
thallus

A vegetative structure that is not differentiated into stem and leaves, as in lichens, algae, thallose liverworts, and certain vascular plants, e.g. Lemna
theca
One of the usually two synangia in which pollen is produced in flowering plants. It consists of two fused sporangia known as pollen sacs. The wall between the pollen sacs disintegrates before dehiscence, which is usually by a common slit.
thorn
A sharp, stiff point, usually a modified stem, that cannot be detached without tearing the subtending tissue; a spine. Compare prickle.
throat
The opening of a corolla or perianth.
thyrse
A branched inflorescence in which the main axis is indeterminate (racemose) and the lateral branches determinate (cymose).
tomentellous
Minutely tomentose.
tomentum

A dense covering of short, matted hairs. Tomentose is often used as a general term for bearing an indumentum, but this is not a recommended use.
toothed
Having a more or less regularly incised margin.
torus
See receptacle.
transmitting tissue
See pollen transmitting tissue.
trapeziform
1. Like a trapezium (a four-sided figure with two parallel sides of unequal length).
2. Like a trapezoid (a four-sided figure, or quadrilateral, with neither pair of sides equal); sometimes used erroneously as a synonym for rhombic.
tree
A woody perennial plant, usually with a single distinct trunk and able to attain more than 6 metres (20 ft) tall.
triad
A group of three.
triangular
Planar and with 3 sides.
tribe
A taxonomic grouping that ranks between genus and family.
trichome
In non-filamentous plants, any hair-like outgrowth from the epidermis, e.g. a hair or bristle; sometimes restricted to unbranched epidermal outgrowths.
trichotomous
3-forked or branched into three. Compare dichotomous.
trifid
Split into three parts. See also bifid.
trifoliate
A compound leaf of three leaflets; for example, a clover leaf.
trifoliolate
See trifoliate.
trigonous
Triangular in cross-section and obtusely angled. Compare triquetrous.
trimerous
In three parts, particularly with respect to flowers; having three parts in each whorl. See also tetramerous and pentamerous.
trinerved
Having three nerves or veins.
triplinerved
(of leaves) Having three main nerves with the lateral nerves arising from the midnerve above the base of the leaf.
triporate
(of pollen) Having three pores.
triquetrous
More or less triangular in cross-section, but acutely angled (with 3 distinct longitudinal ridges). Compare trigonous.
trivalve
Divided into three valves. Also trivalvar. See also bivalve.
trivial name
The second word in the two-part scientific name of an organism. Compare specific epithet.
trophophyll
A vegetative, nutrient-producing leaf or microphyll whose primary function is photosynthesis. It is not specialized or modified for some other function. Compare sporophyll.
trullate
Ovate but angled, as with a bricklayer's trowel; inversely kite-shaped. Compare rhombic.
truncate
Cut off squarely; having an abruptly transverse end.
trunk
The upright, large and typically woody main stem of a tree.
truss
A compact cluster of flowers or fruits arising from one center; evident in many rhododendrons.
tuber
Any of many types of specialized vegetative underground storage organs. They accumulate food, water, or in protection from death by fire, drought, or other hard times. Tubers generally are well differentiated from other plant organs; for example, informally a carrot is not generally regarded as a tuber, but simply a swollen root. In this they differ from the tuber of a sweet potato, which has no special root-like function. Similarly, corms are not generally regarded as tubers, even though they are underground storage stems. Tubers store food for the plant, and also have important roles in vegetative reproduction. They generally are of two main types: stem tubers form by the swelling of an underground stem growing from a root, or from structures such as underground stolons. Stem tubers generally produce propagative buds at their stem nodes, forming a seasonal perennating organ, e.g. a potato. The main other class is the root tuber, also called tuberoid. They differ from stem tubers in features such as that, like any normal root, they do not form nodes.
tubercle
A small wart-like outgrowth or protuberance of tissue.
tuberculate
Covered in tubercles. See warty.
tuberoid
An alternative name for underground storage organ formed by the swelling of a root; occurs in many orchids.
tuberous
Resembling a tuber or producing tubers.
tubular
Having the form of a tube or cylinder.
tufted
Densely fasciculate at the tip.
tunic
The outer covering of some bulbs and corms.
tunicate
(of bulbs) Consisting of concentric coats.
turbinate
Shaped like a spinning top or beetroot.
turgid
Swollen with liquid; bloated; firm. Compare flaccid.
tussock
A dense tuft of vegetation, usually well separated from neighbouring tussocks, for example in some grasses. Compare sward.
two-ranked
Having leaves arranged in two rows in the same plane, on opposite sides of the branch. See distichous.
type
An item (usually an herbarium specimen) to which the name of a taxon is permanently attached, i.e. a designated representative of a plant name. Important in determining the priority of names available for a particular taxon.
type genus
In nomenclature, a single genus on which a taxonomic family is based.
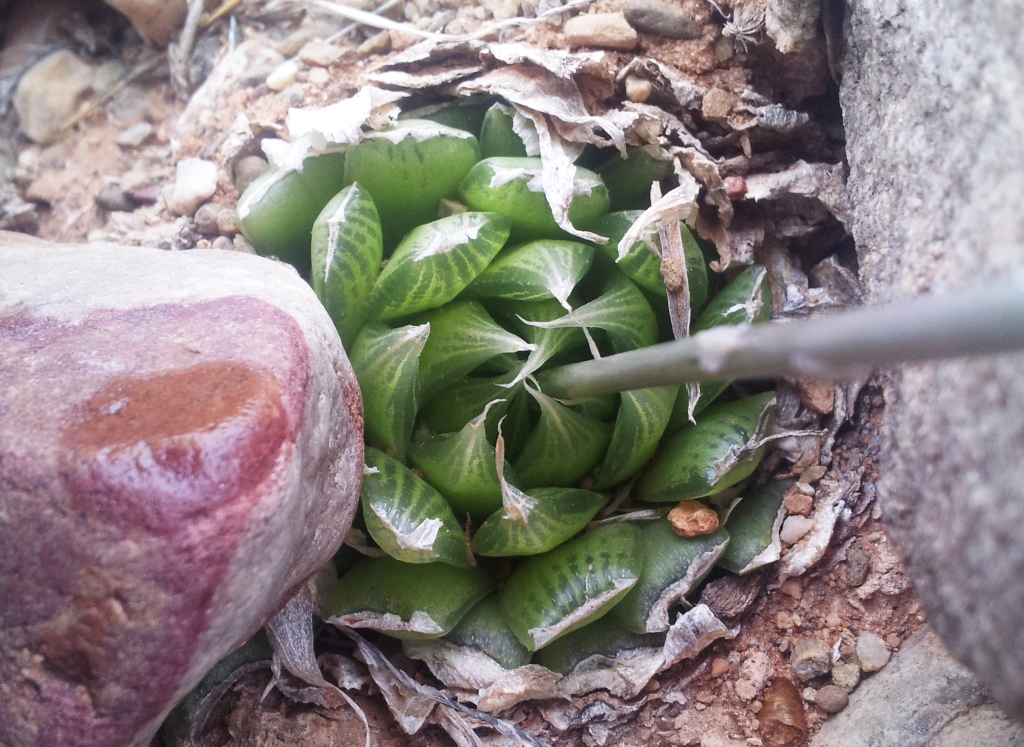
Haworthia lockwoodii, with its leaves turgid and green after seasonal rains, store water against the coming dry period.

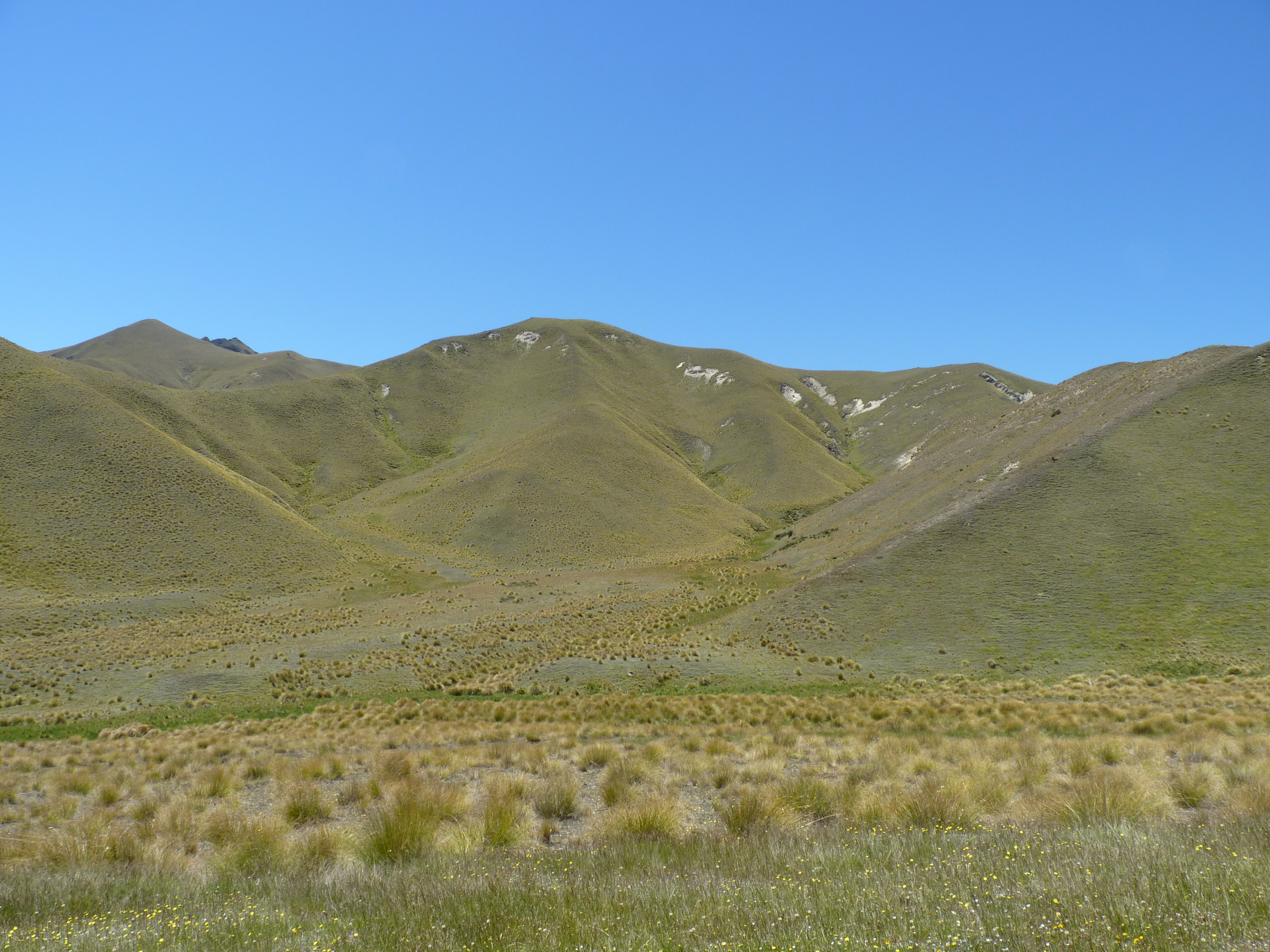
Tussock grasses on mountain slopes

== U ==
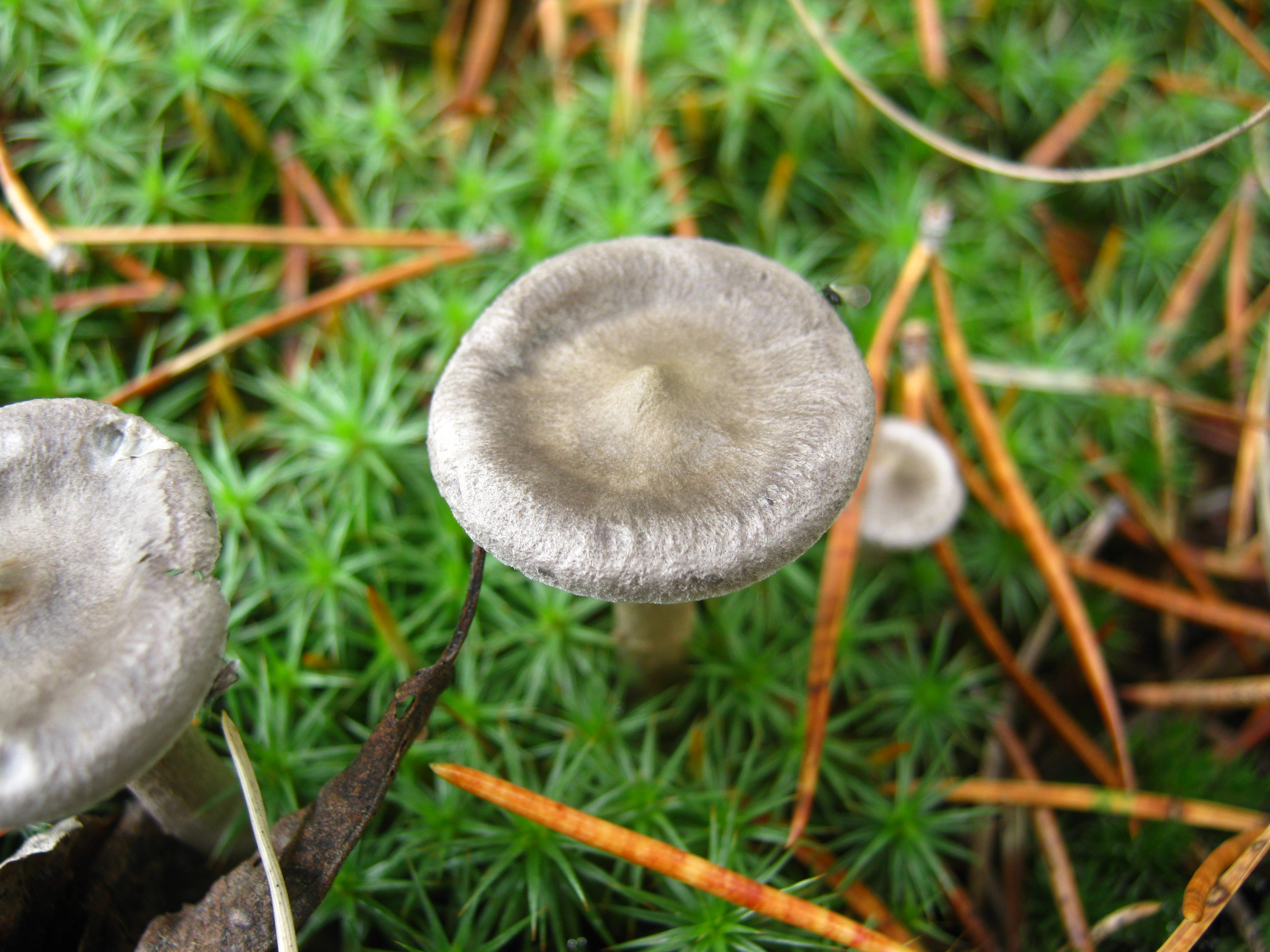
Umbo in the middle of the cap of Cantharellula umbonata

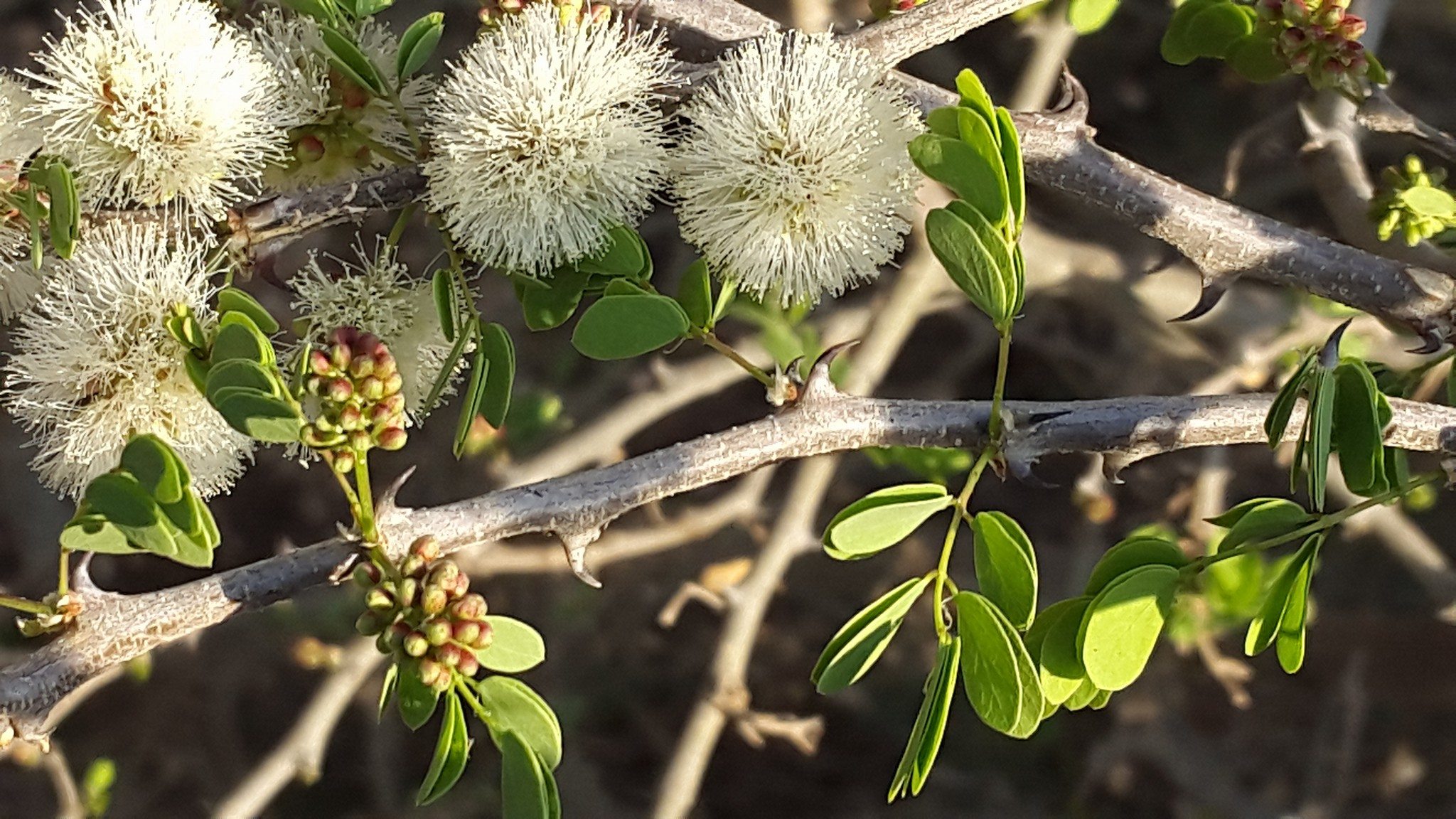
Thorny prickles of Senegalia mellifera subspecies detinens are unciform.

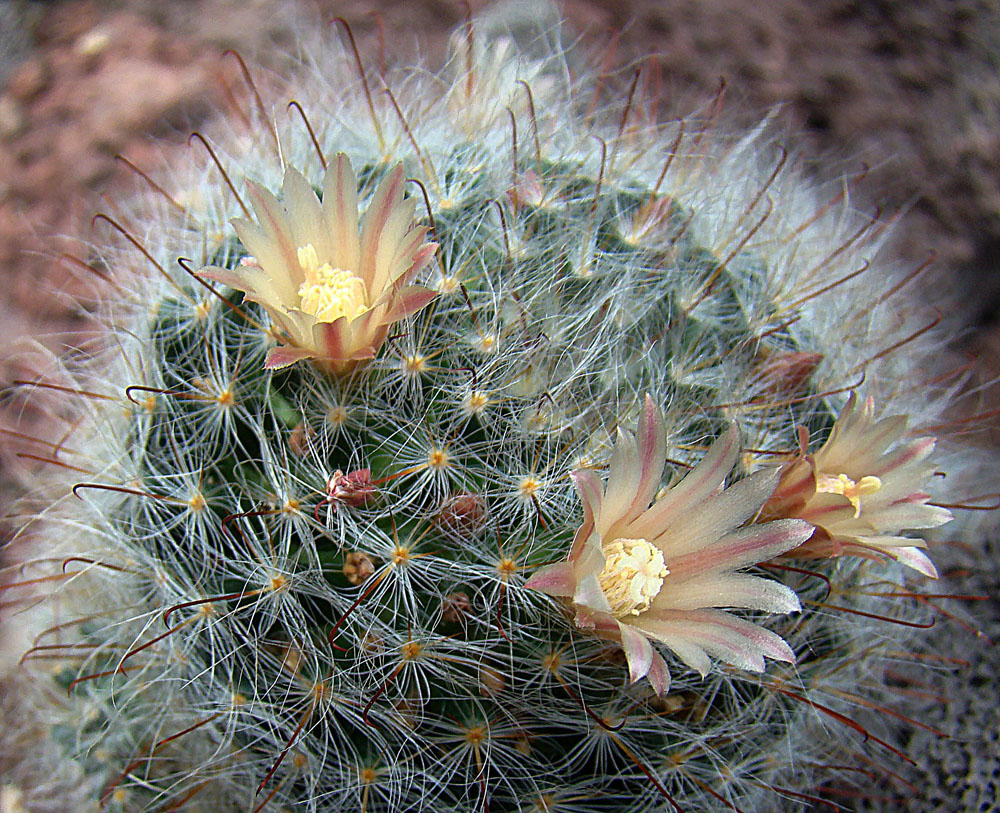
Mammillaria bocasana has uncinate tips on its major spines.

umbel
A racemose inflorescence in which all the individual flower stalks arise in a cluster at the top of the peduncle and are of about equal length; in a simple umbel, each stalk is unbranched and bears only one flower. A cymose umbel looks similar to an ordinary umbel but its flowers open centrifugally.
umbo
A rounded elevation, such as in the middle of the top of an umbrella or mushroom; a central boss or protuberance, such as on the scale of a cone.
umbonate
Having an umbo, with a conical or blunt projection arising from a flatter surface, as on the top of a mushroom or in the scale of a pine cone.
unciform
Hook-shaped.
uncinate
Having a hook at the apex.
undershrub
A low shrub, often with flowering branches that die off in winter. Compare subshrub.
understory
Plant life growing beneath the forest canopy.
undulate
Wavy and not flat. Compare sinuate.
uniflor
Having a single flower (uniflory). Compare pauciflor (few) and pluriflor (many).
unilocular
Having one loculus or chamber, e.g. the ovary in the families Proteaceae and Fabaceae.
uniserial
Arranged in a single row or series. Unbranched. Uniseriate.
uniseriate
Arranged in a single row or series. Unbranched. Uniserial.
unisexual
Of one sex; bearing only male or only female reproductive organs, dioecious, dioicous. See Sexual reproduction in plants.
unitegmic
(of an ovule) Covered by a single integument. See also bitegmic, having two integuments.
urceolate
Shaped like an urn or pitcher, with a swollen middle and narrowing top. Examples include the pitchers of many species of the pitcher plant genera Sarracenia and Nepenthes.
usu.
An abbreviation of usually. Compare s.t. and oft..
utricle
1. A small bladder; a membranous bladder-like sac from the ovary wall with thin pericarp which becomes inflated at maturity enclosing an ovary or fruit.
2. In sedges, a fruit which is loosely enclosed by a modified tubular bract, see perigynium.
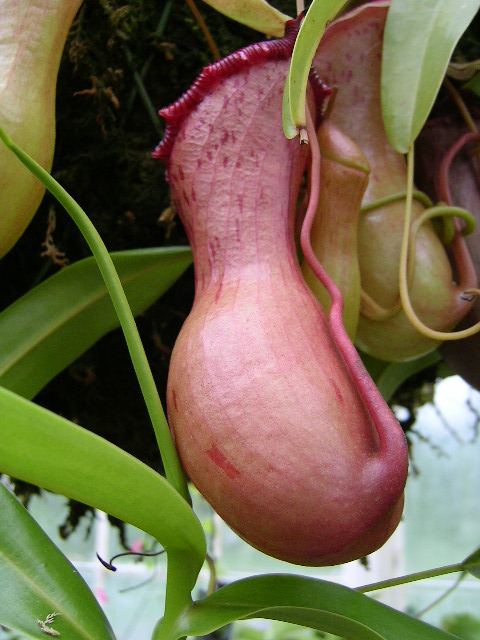
Pitchers of the species Nepenthes ventricosa tend to be markedly urceolate.

== V ==
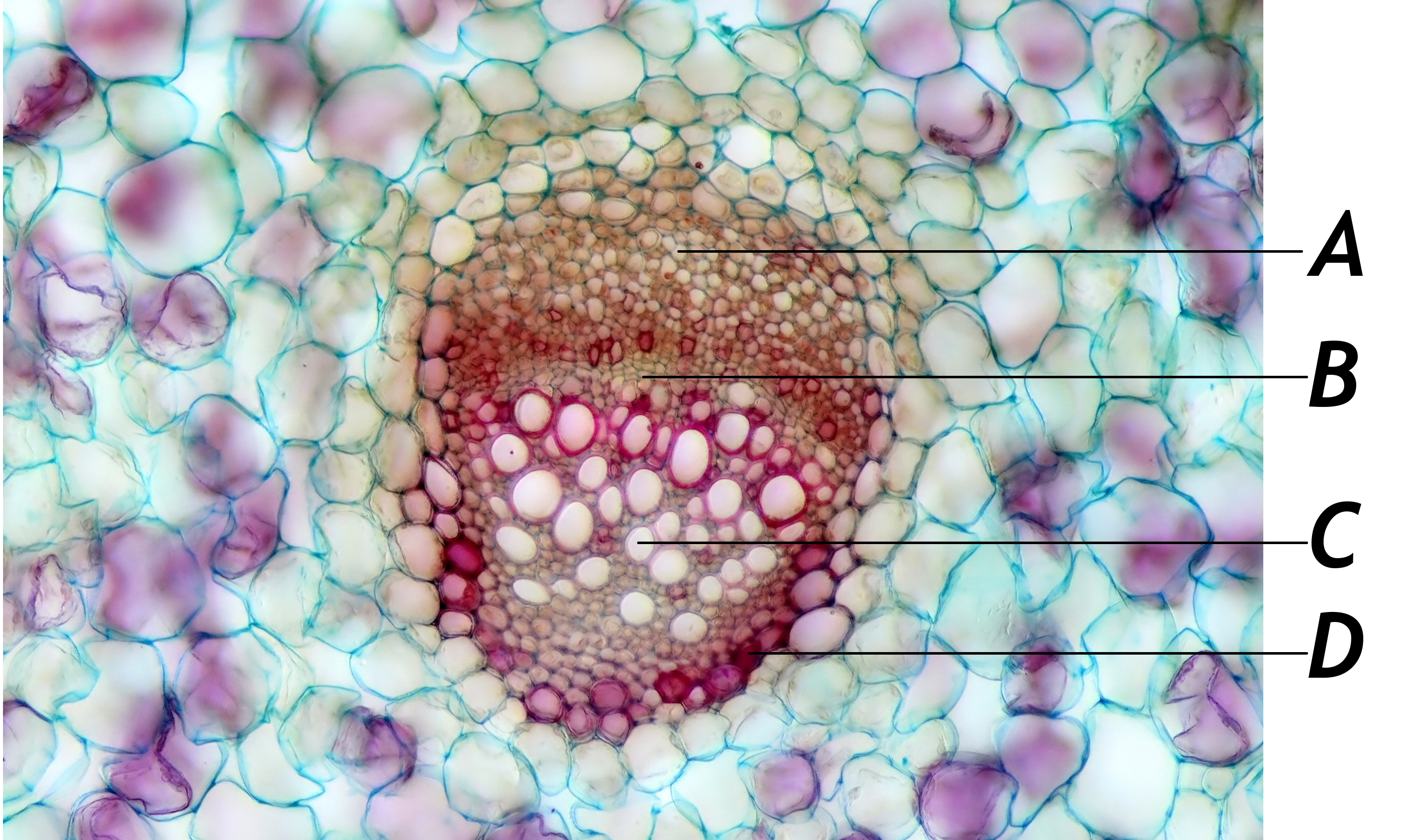
Photomicrograph of a cross section of a vascular bundle in the stem of a typical herbaceous dicotyledon A: Phloem B: Cambium C: Xylem D: Fibrous sheath of vascular bundle

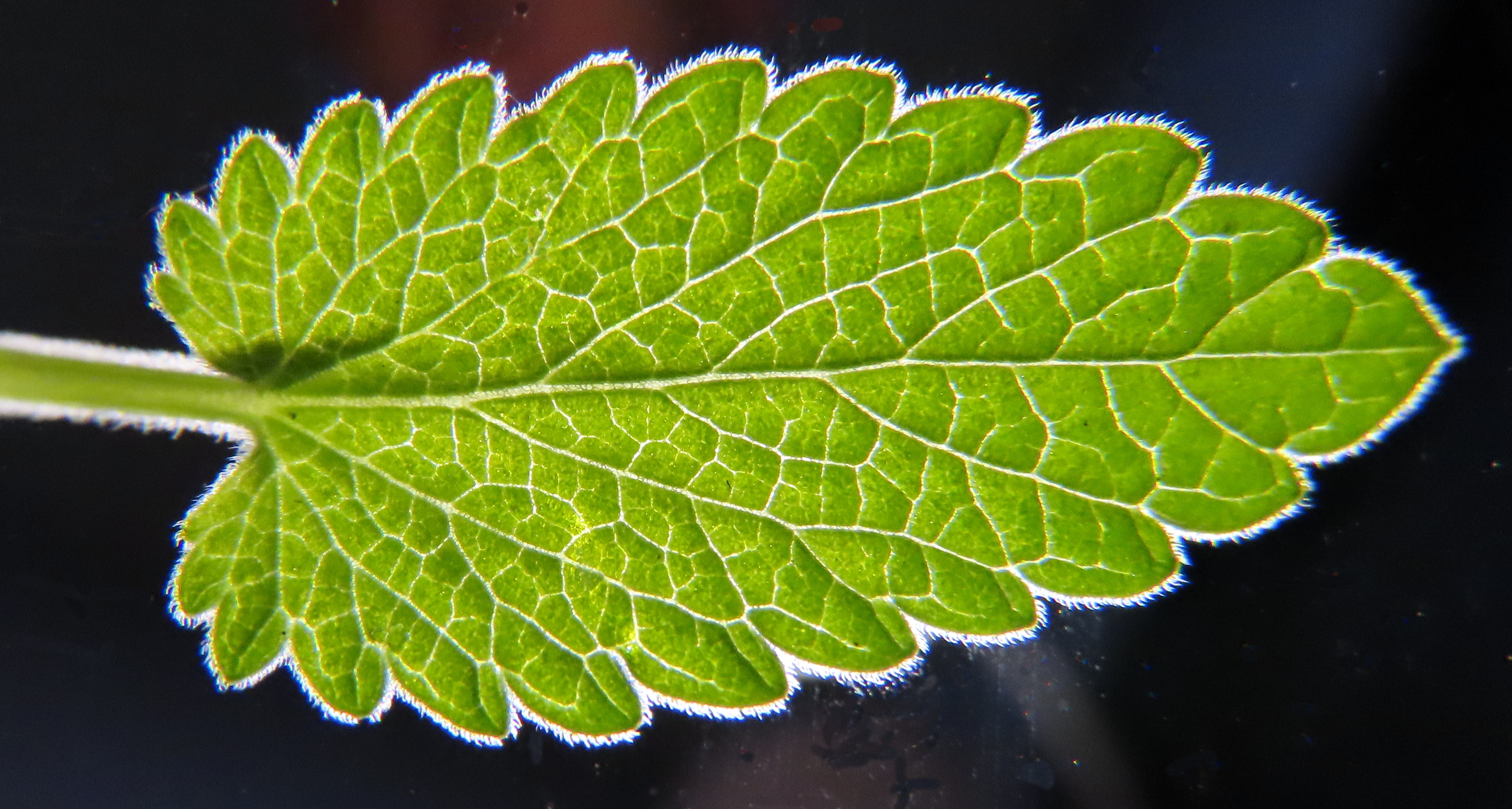
Leaf veins and velutinous hairs of Nepeta

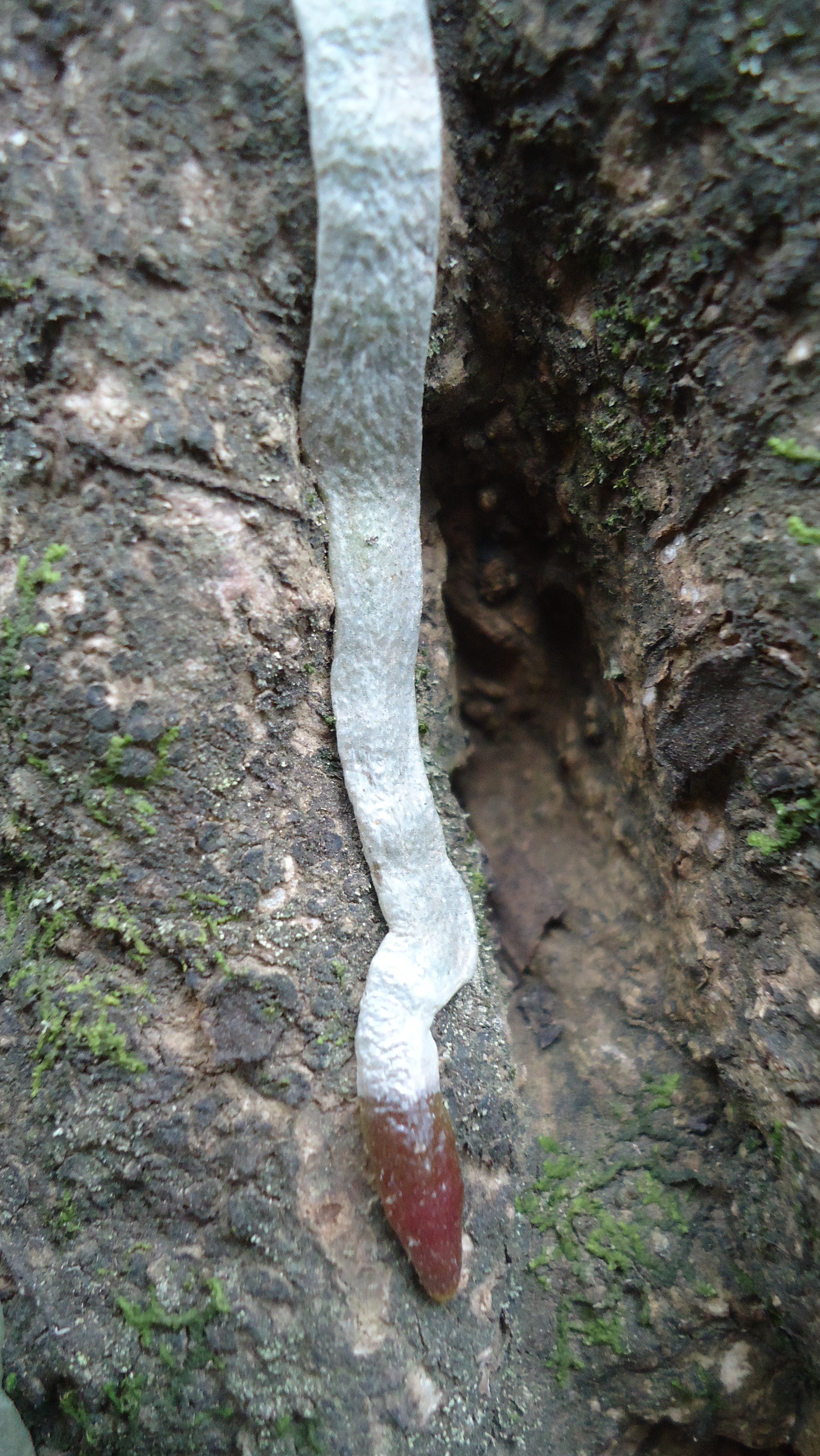
Velamen, the pale grey membrane covering the mature part of the root of an epiphyte

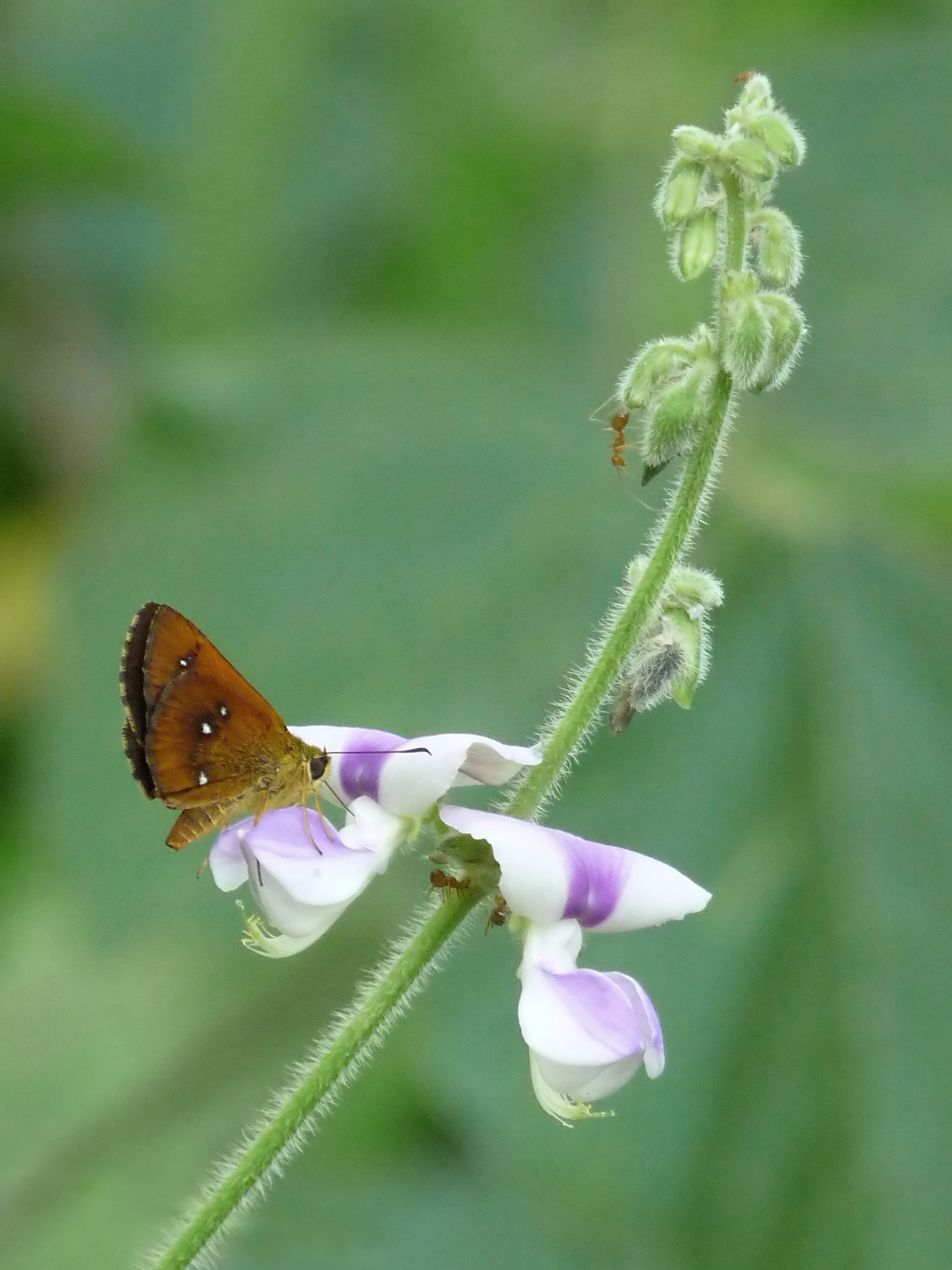
Flower stalks and sepal tubes of Pueraria phaseoloides are covered with velutinous (velvety) hairs.

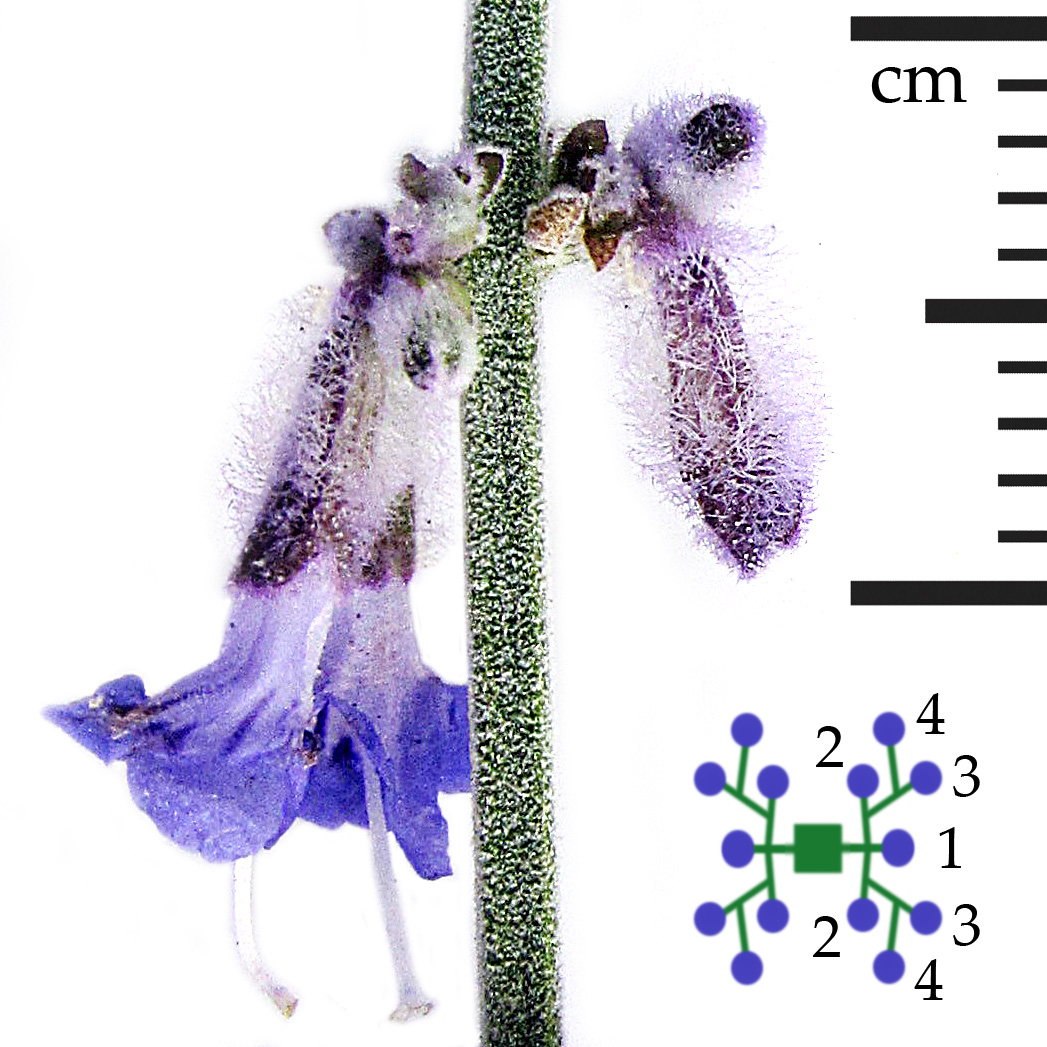
Verticillaster of Salvia yangii

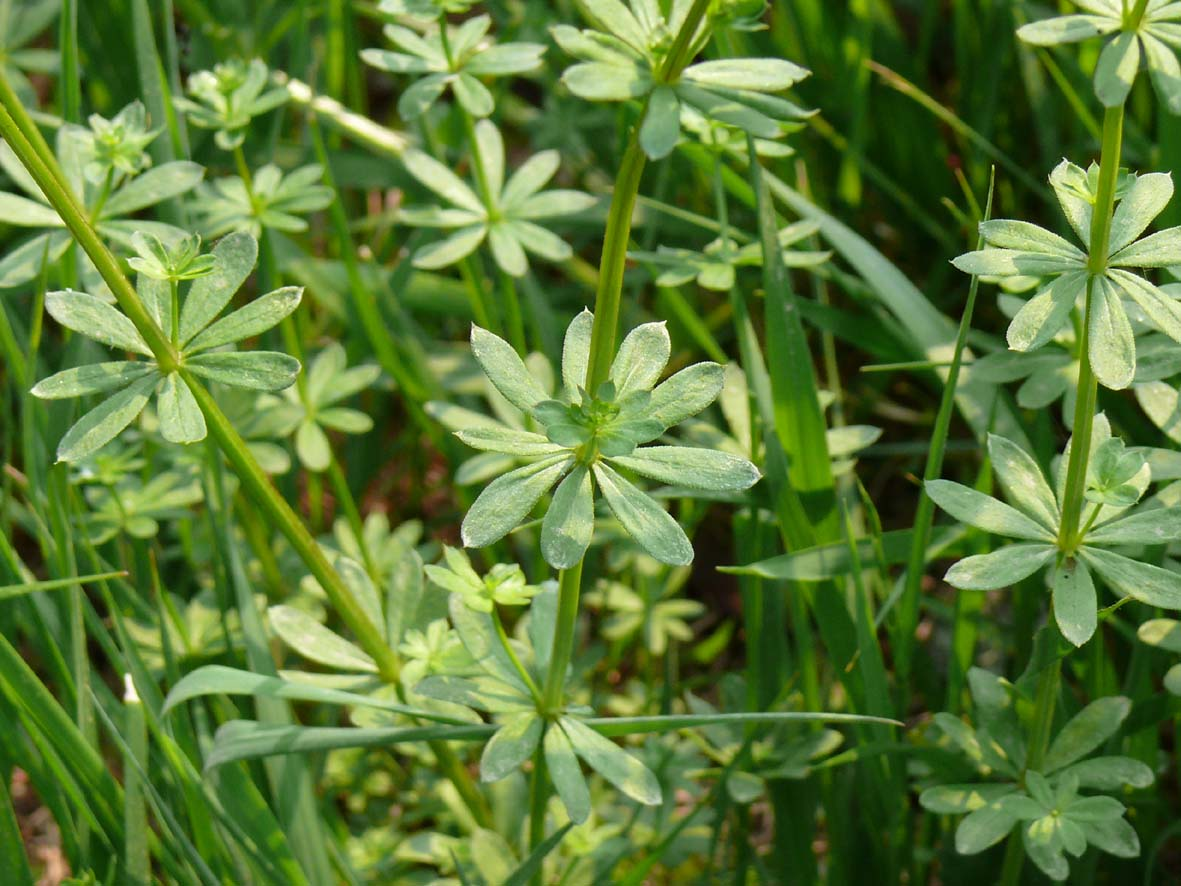
Verticillate leaves and emerging branchlets of a Galium species

vallecular canal
A resin canal coinciding with a longitudinal groove in the seeds of Asteraceae. A longitudinal cavity in the cortex of the stems of Equisetum, coinciding with a groove in the stem surface.
valvate
(of sepals and petals in bud) Meeting edge-to-edge but not overlapping.
valve
A portion of an organ that fragments or splits open, e.g. the teeth-like portions of a pericarp in a split (dehisced) capsule or pod when ripe.
var.
An abbreviation of varietas.
variant
A plant or group of plants showing some measure of difference from the characteristics associated with a particular taxon.
variegated
Irregularly marked with blotches or patches of another color.
varietas

A taxonomic rank below that of species and between the ranks of subspecies and form.
vascular
Referring to the conducting tissues (xylem and phloem) of vascular plants.
vascular bundle
A bundle of vascular tissue in the primary stems of vascular plants, consisting of specialized conducting cells for the transport of water (xylem) and assimilate (phloem).
vasculum
A container used by botanists for collecting field specimens.
vein

A strand of vascular tissue, e.g. in the leaves of vascular plants.
veinlet
A small vein; the ultimate (visible) division of a vein.
velamen
A spongy tissue covering the aerial roots of orchids and some other epiphytes.
velutinous
See velvety.
velvety
Densely covered with fine, short, soft, erect hairs.
venation
The arrangement of veins in a leaf.
ventral
From Latin venter, meaning "belly". The opposite of dorsal. Partly because the term originally referred to animals rather than plants, usage in botany is arbitrary according to context and source. In general "ventral" refers to "the belly or lower part", but in botanical usage such concepts are not always clearly defined and may be contradictory. For example:
- facing toward the axis (adaxial) in referring to a lateral organ of an erect plant
- facing toward the substrate in any part of an erect plant, for example the lower surface of a more or less horizontal leaf (abaxial)
- facing toward the substrate in a prostrate or climbing plant.
For more detail see dorsal.
vernation
The arrangement of unexpanded leaves in a bud; the order in which leaves unfold from a bud.
vernicose
Having a shiny or polished surface as if covered in varnish and a slick or smooth texture.
vernonioid
In the family Asteraceae, style with sweeping hairs borne on abaxial surfaces of style branches.
verruciform
Wart-like in form.
verrucose
Having warts.
verruculose
Minutely verrucose; minutely warty.
versatile
(of anthers) Swinging freely about the point of attachment to the filament.
verticillate
Arranged in one or more whorls, i.e. several similar parts arranged at the same point of the axis, e.g. leaf arrangement. Compare pseudoverticillate (appearing whorled or verticillate but not actually so).
verticillaster
A type of pseudoverticillate inflorescence, typical of the Lamiaceae, in which pseudo-whorls are formed from pairs of opposite cymes.
vesicular
(of hairs) Bladder-like; vesiculous, bearing such hairs.
vessel
A capillary tube formed from a series of open-ended cells in the water-conducting tissue of a plant.
vestigial
Reduced in form and function from the normal or ancestral condition.
villosulous
Minutely villous.
villous
Abounding in or covered with long, soft, straight hairs; shaggy with soft hairs.
vine
1. Scandent plants climbing by means of trailing or twining stems or runners.
2. Such a stem or runner.
3. A member of the genus Vitis.
virgate

Wand-shaped, twiggy, especially referring to erect, straight stems. In mycology, referring to a pileus with radiating ribs or lines.
Viridiplantae
A clade of autotrophic organisms that includes the green algae, Charophyta and land plants, all of which have cellulose in their cell walls, chloroplasts derived from primary endosymbiosis with cyanobacteria that contain chlorophylls a and b and lack phycobilins.
viscid
Sticky; coated with a thick, syrupy secretion.
viscidium
A sticky pad or strap coated with an adhesive secretion, forming part of the structure of the pollinium or the pollinarium of many species of plants, most notoriously orchids. In pollination the viscidium sticks the pollen burden to a visiting pollinator, that in turn is likely to visit other flowers of the same species, bearing a concentrated burden of pollen. Such flowers commonly are adapted to stripping the pollinium off incoming pollinators.
vitta

An oil tube in the fruit of some plants.
viviparous
1. Referring to seeds or fruits which germinate before being shed from the parent plant.
2. The development of plantlets on non-floral organs, e.g. leaves.
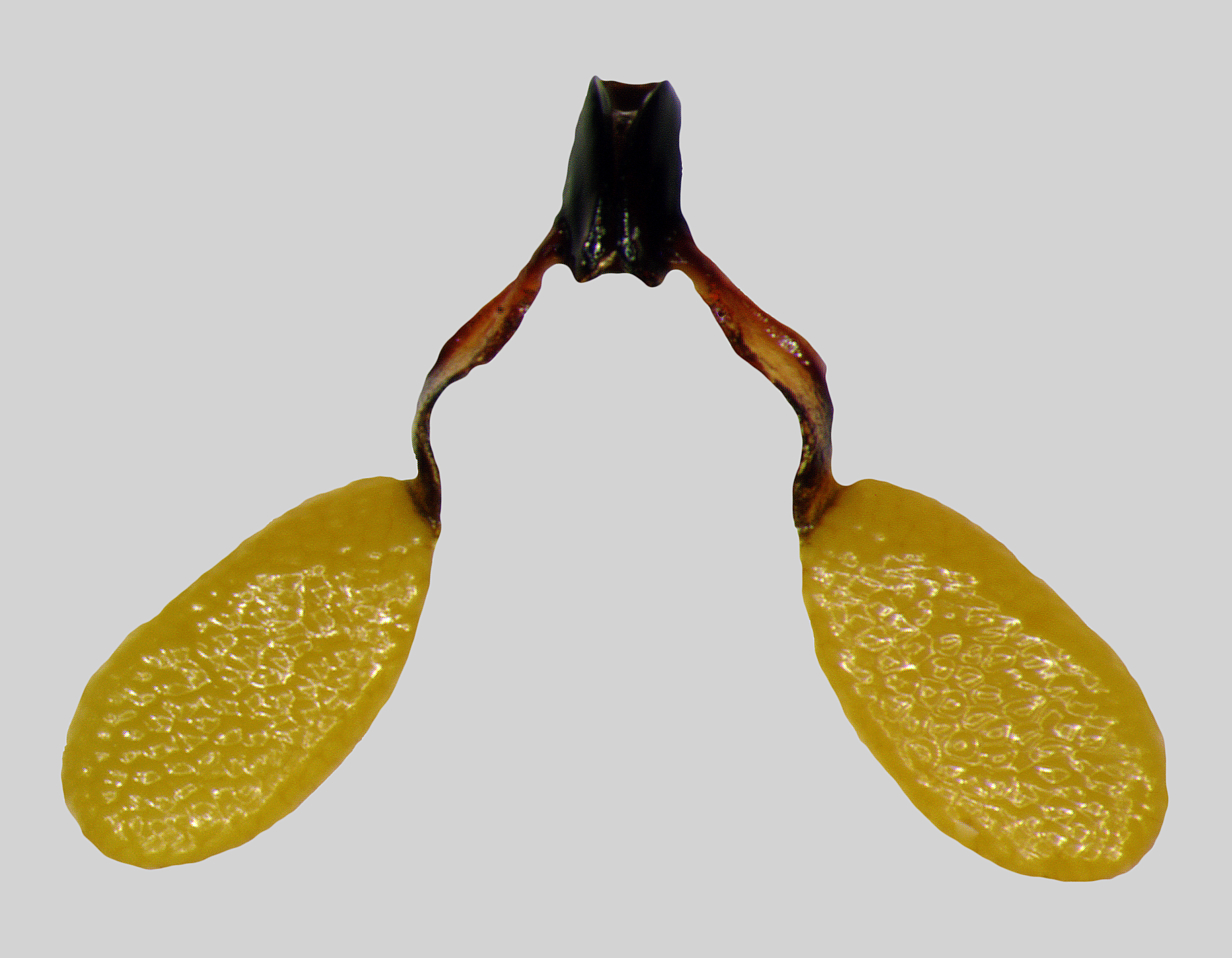
In this pollinarium the viscidium is the sticky lump in the middle of the yoke-like stipe connecting the two pollinia.

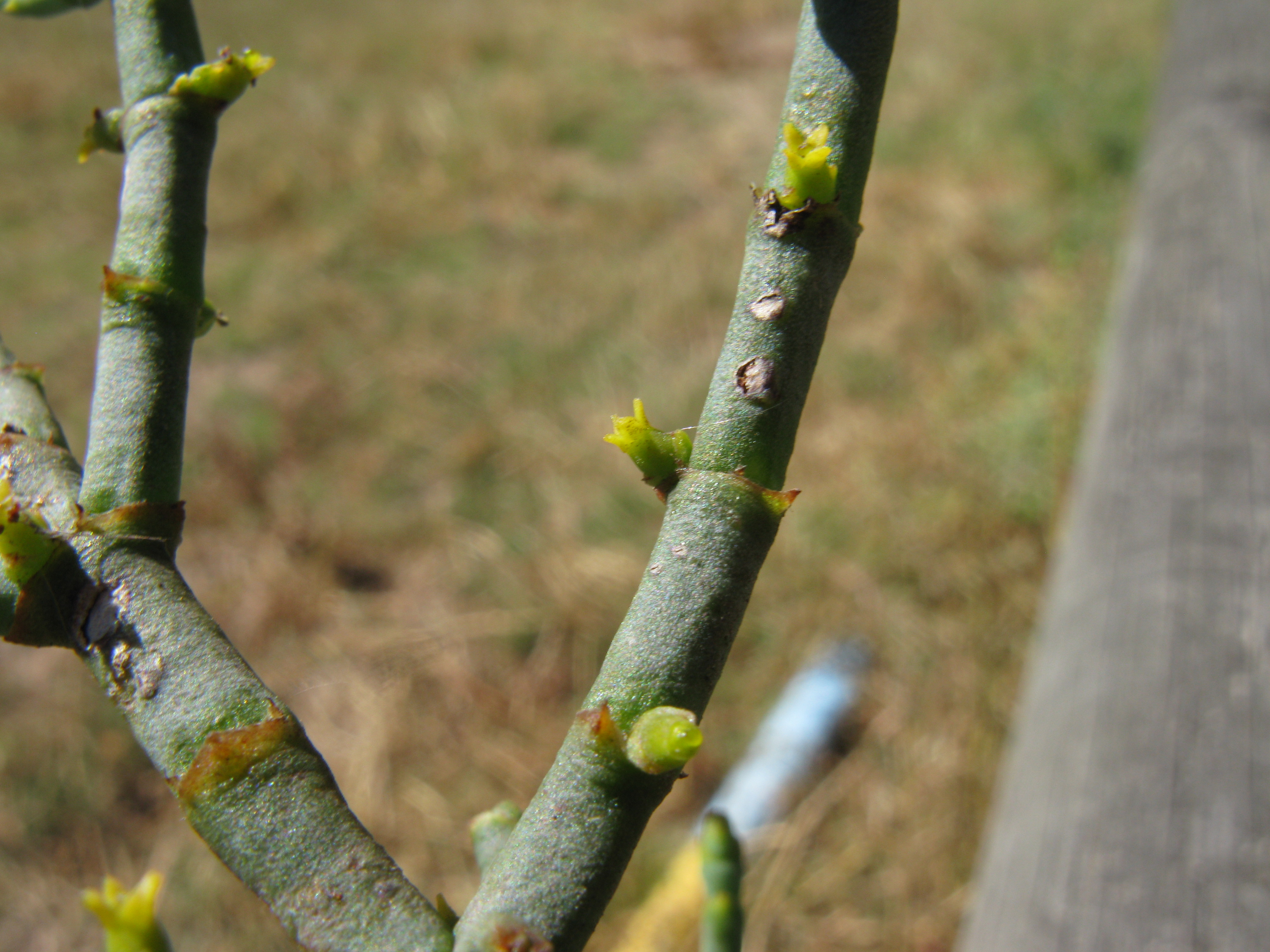
Vestigial leaf scales on stem nodes of Viscum capense

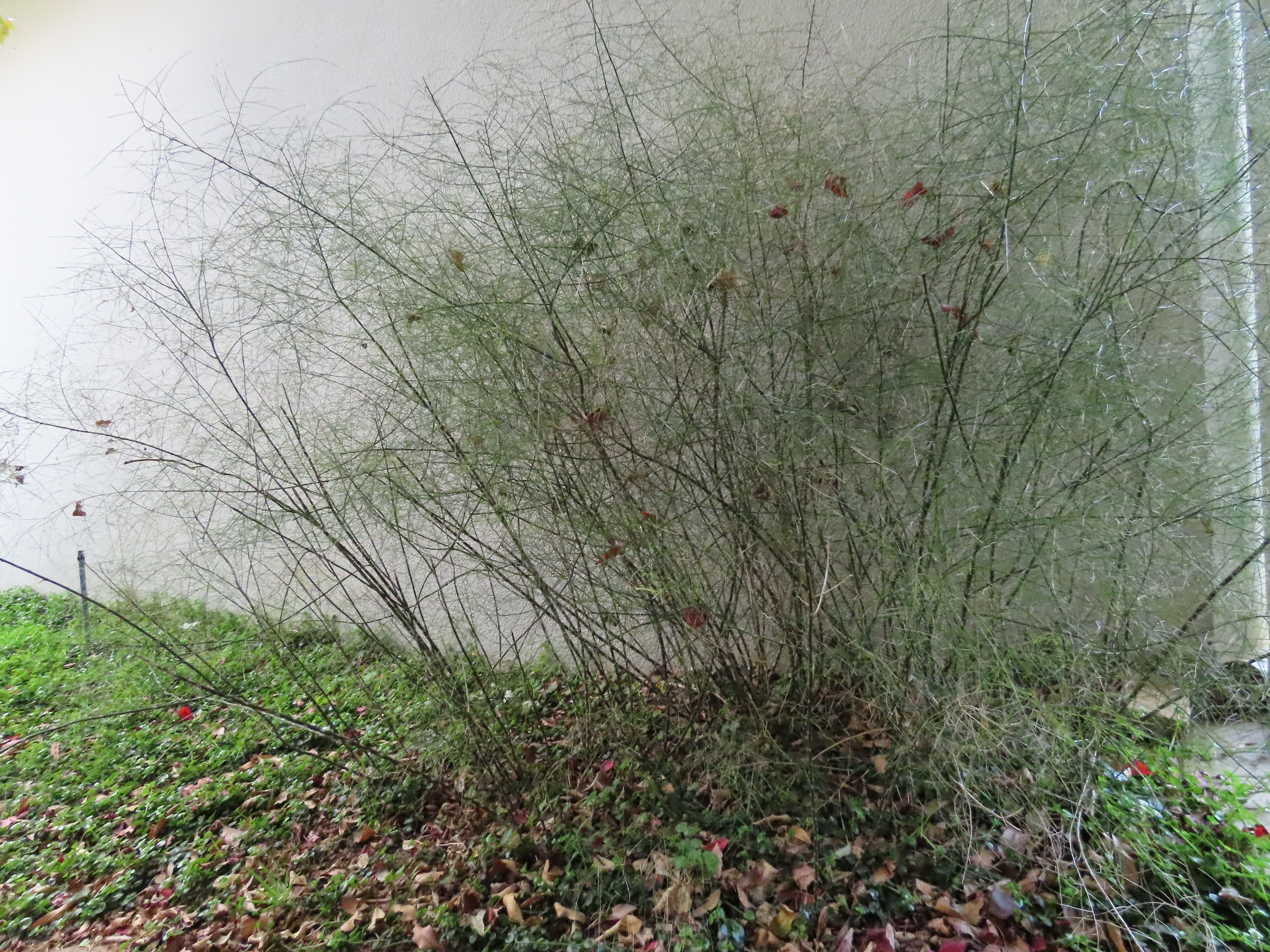
Asparagus virgatus owes its specific epithet virgatus to the twiggy appearance of its virgate shoots.

== W ==
warty
A surface covered with small round protuberances, especially in fruit, leaves, twigs and bark. See tuberculate.
watershoot
An erect, strong-growing, or epicormic shoot developing from near the base of a shrub or tree, but distinct from a sucker.
weed
1. Any plant growing where it is not wanted; commonly associated with disrupted habitats. See also ruderal.
2. An unwanted plant which grows among agricultural crops.
3. A naturalised, exotic, or ecologically "out-of-balance" indigenous species outside of the agricultural or garden context, which, as a result of invasion, adversely affects the survival or regeneration of indigenous species in natural or partly natural vegetation communities.
wild
Originating from a known wild or purely natural habitat (wilderness).
whorl
A ring of organs borne at the same level on an axis (e.g. leaves, bracts, or floral parts).
wing
1. A membranous expansion of a fruit or seed which aids in dispersal, for instance on pine seeds.
2. A thin flange of tissue extending beyond the normal outline of a structure, e.g. on the column of some orchids, on stems, on petioles.
3. One of the two lateral petals of a flower of subfamily Faboideae of family Fabaceae, located between the adaxial standard (banner) petal and the two abaxial keel petals.
woody
hard and lignified; not herbaceous
wooly
woolly
Very densely covered with long, more or less matted or intertwined hairs, resembling a sheep's wool.
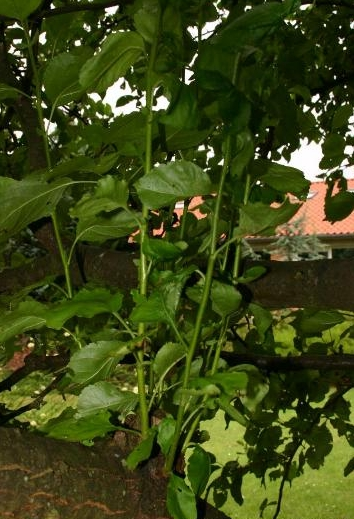
Watershoots

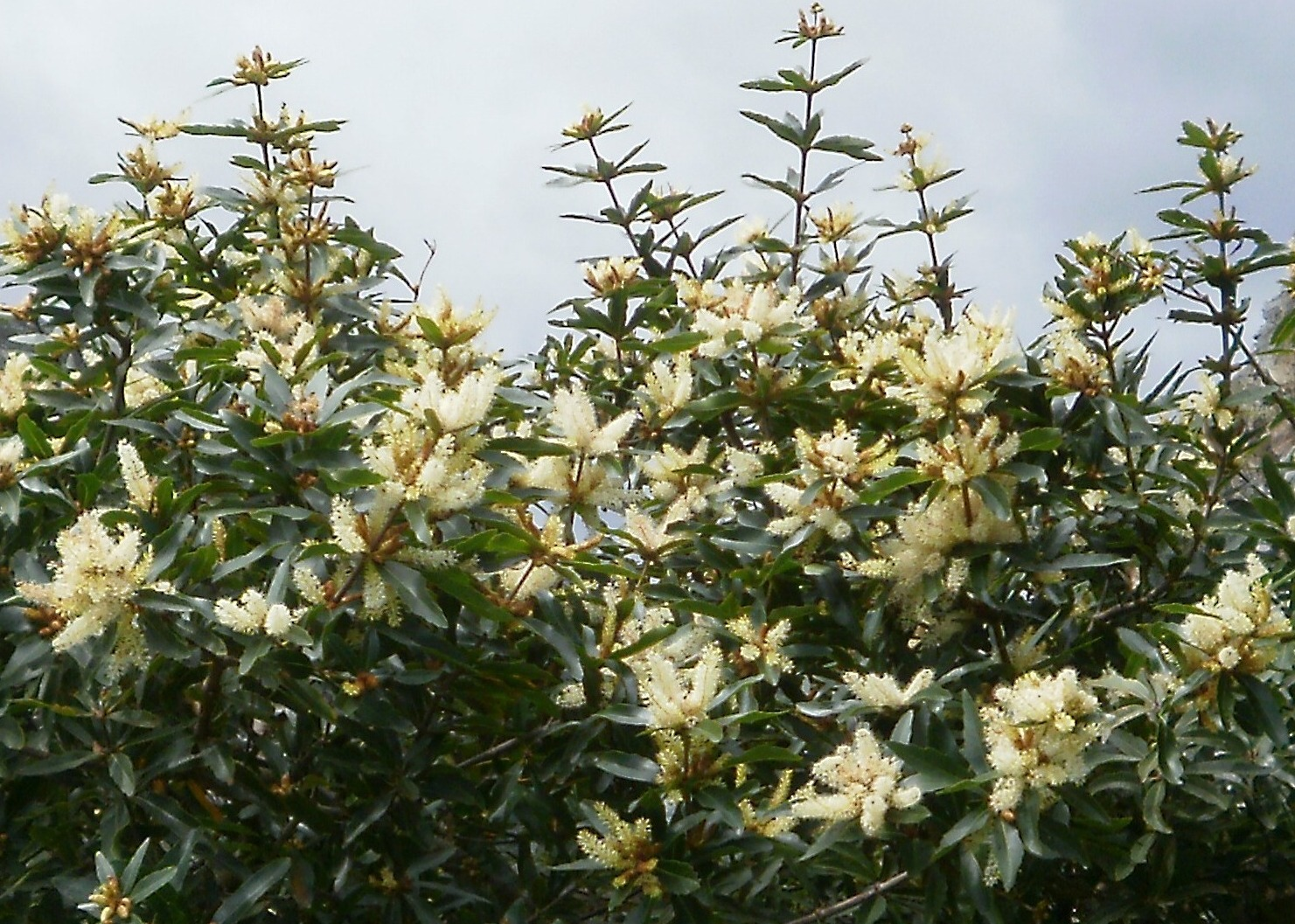
The verticillate whorls of leaves on Brabejum stellatifolium are unusual among trees in its native region.

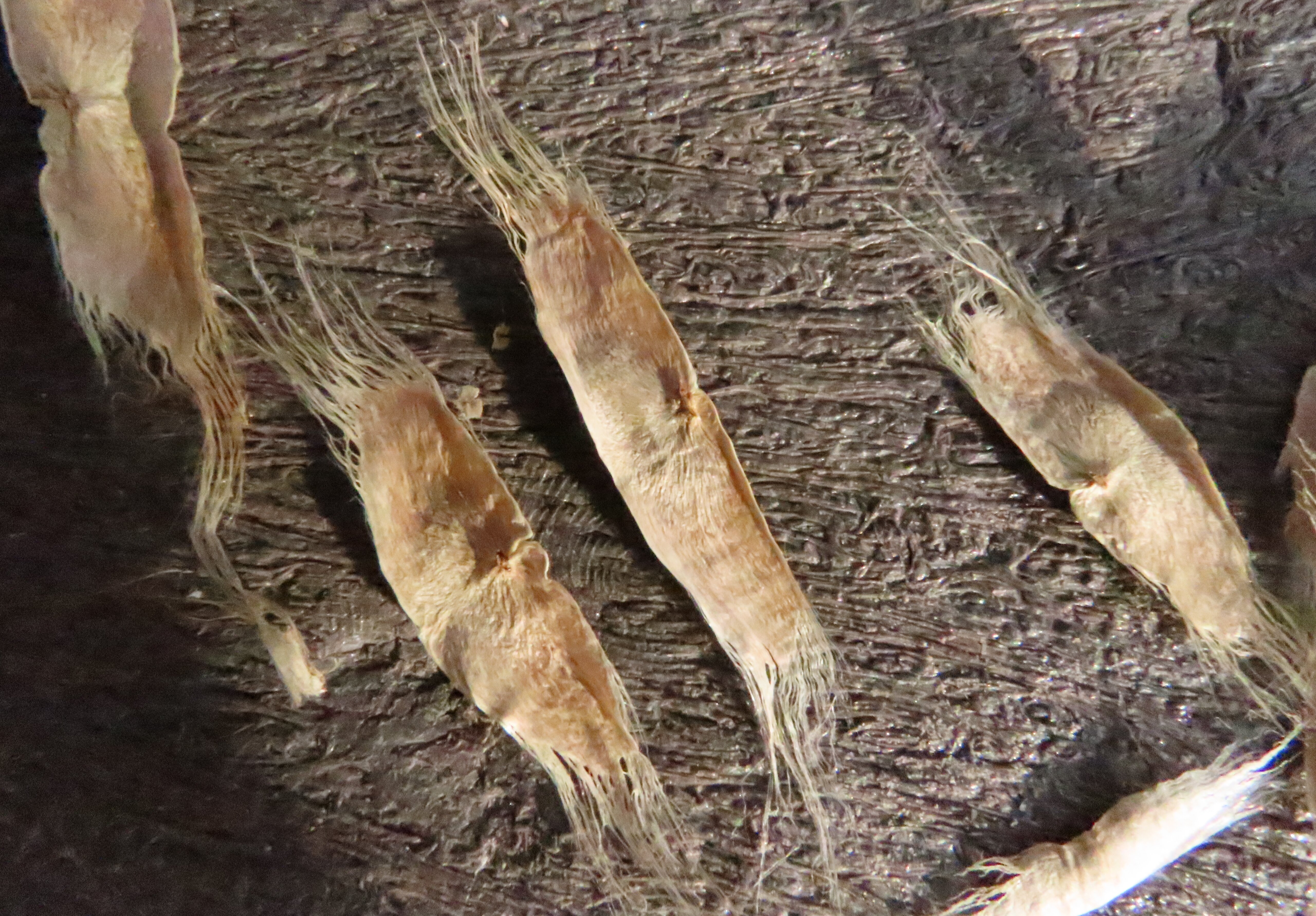
Winged seeds of Catalpa bignonioides are nearly all wing. Tufts at the tips increase aerodynamic drag, thereby improving wind dispersal.

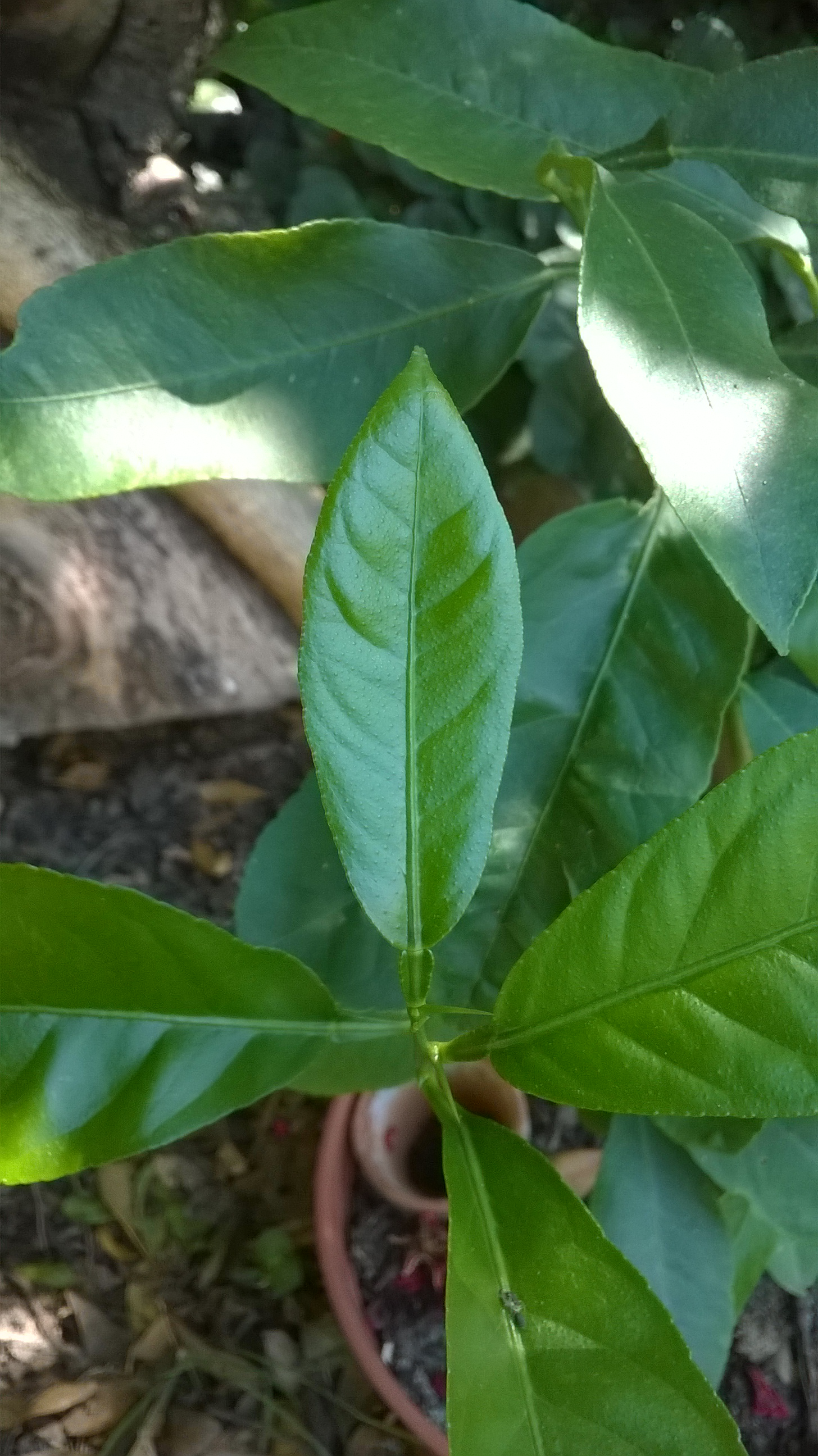
Leaves of some species of Citrus have winged petioles.

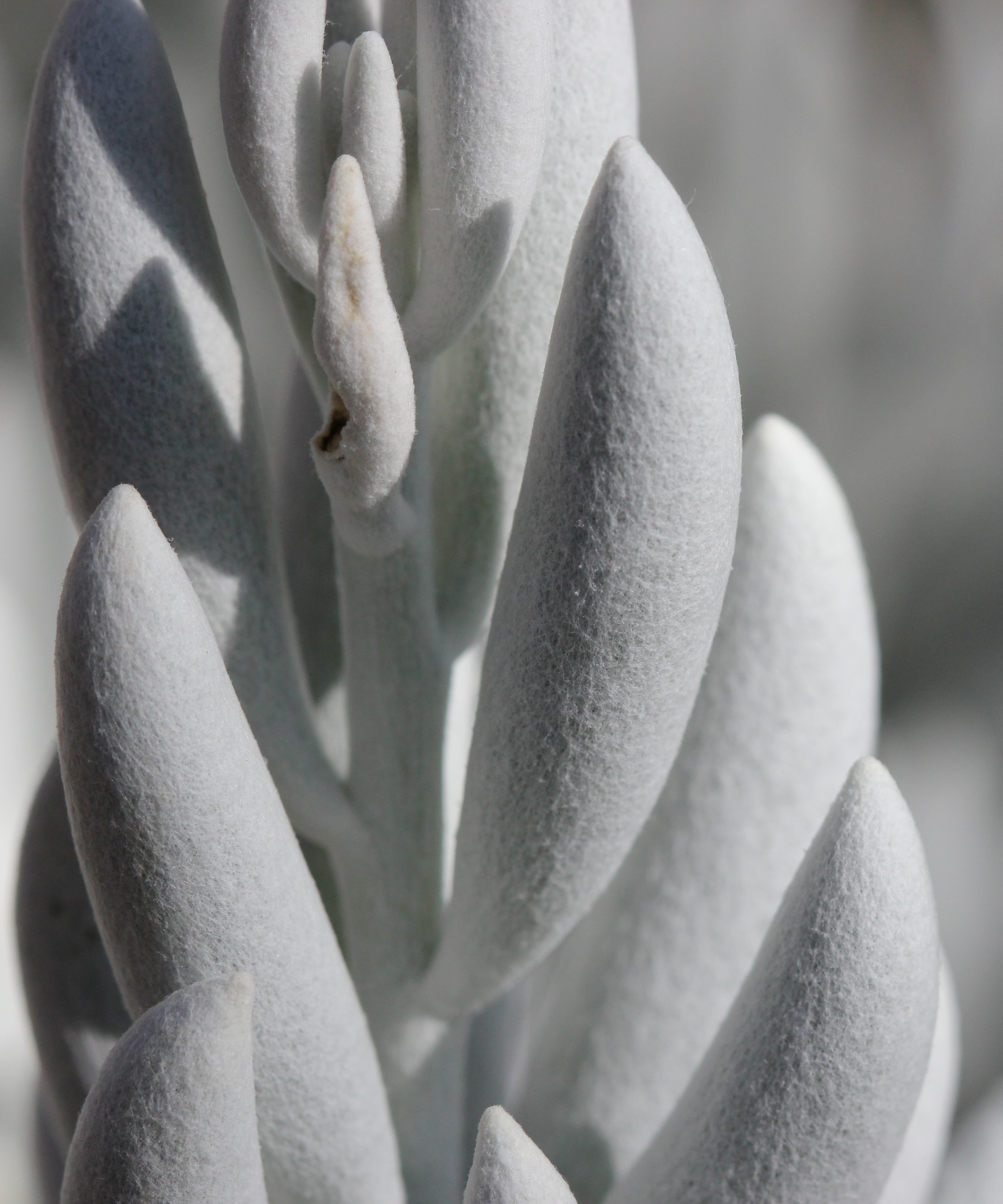
Senecio haworthii leaves have an unusually dense wooly coat.

== X ==
xeromorph
A plant with structural features (e.g. hard or succulent leaves) or functional adaptations that prevent water loss by evaporation; usually associated with arid habitats, but not necessarily drought-tolerant. Compare xerophyte.
xerophyte
A plant generally living in a dry habitat, typically showing xeromorphic or succulent adaptation; a plant able to tolerate long periods of drought. Compare xeromorph.
xylem
A specialized water-conducting tissue in vascular plants.

== Z ==
zonate
Having light and dark circular bands or rings, typically on leaves or flowers.
zygomorphic
Bilaterally symmetrical; symmetrical about one vertical plane only; applies to flowers in which the perianth segments within each whorl vary in size and shape. Contrast actinomorphic and irregular.
zygote
A fertilized cell, the product of fusion of two gametes.
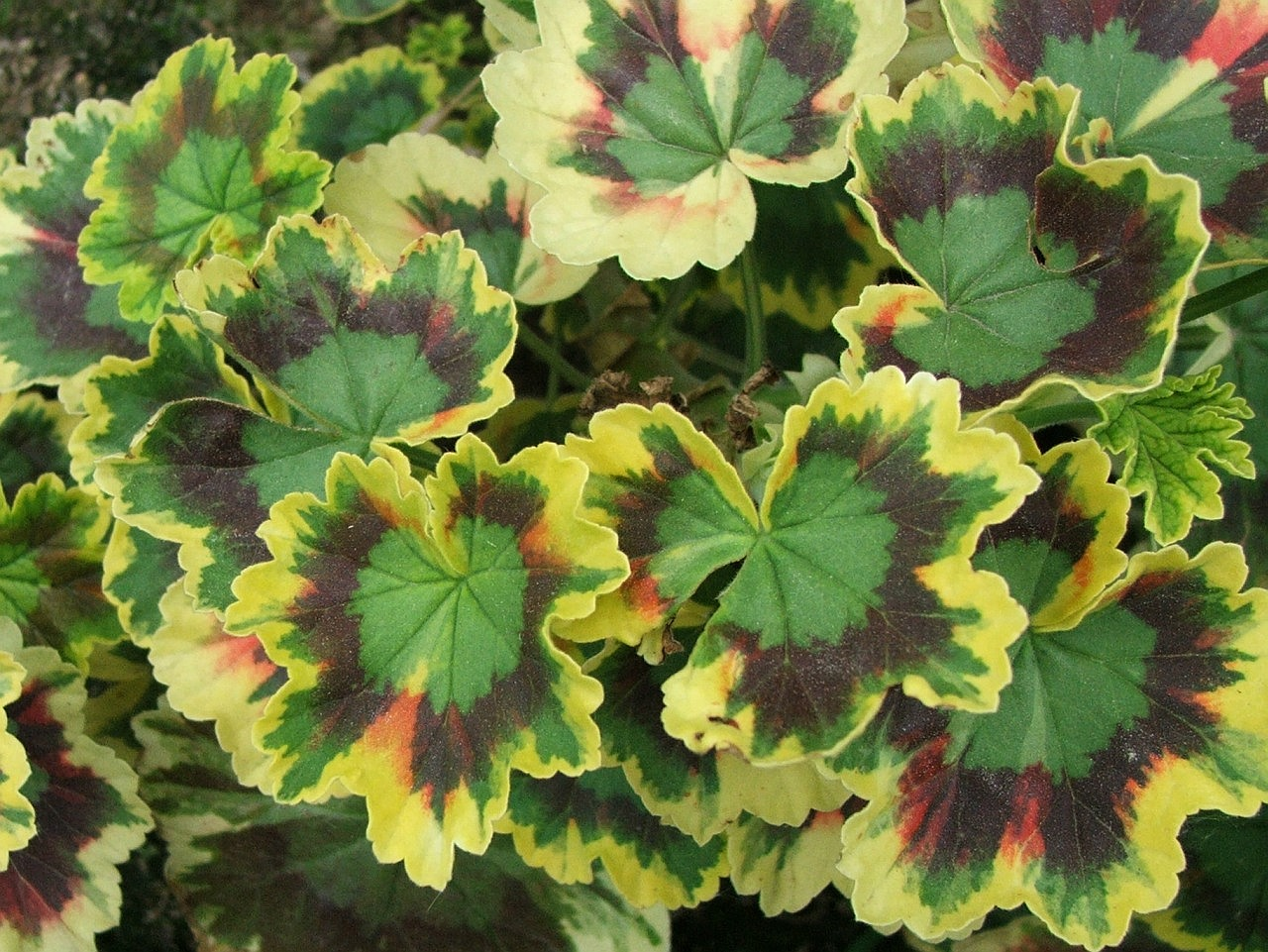
Zonate markings on the leaves of a garden variety of Pelargonium zonale

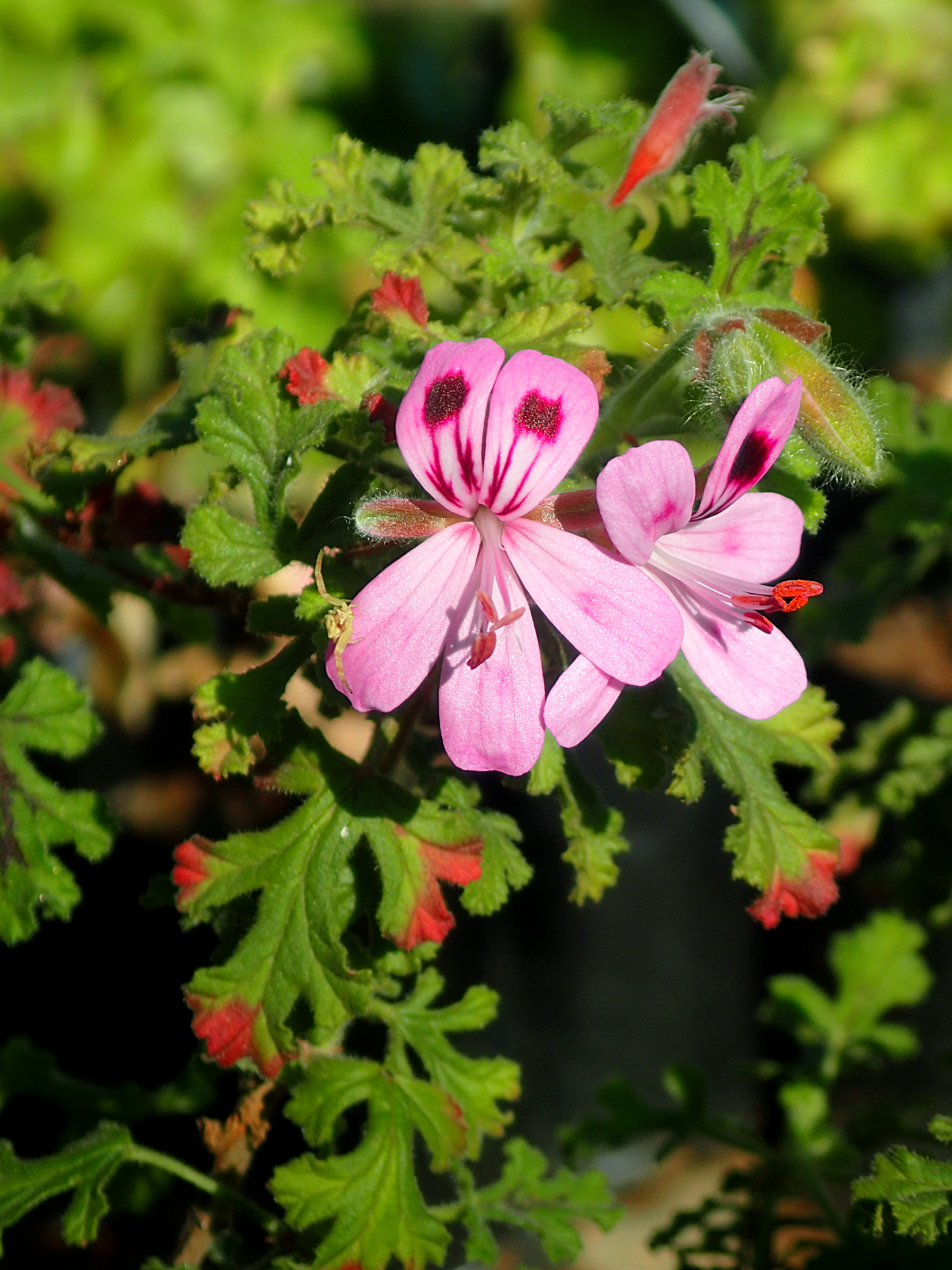
Like most of the genus Pelargonium, and unlike most members of the genus Geranium, Pelargonium quercifolium bears flowers that are bilaterally symmetrical. Accordingly, because the yoke of an ox is bilaterally symmetrical, such flowers are said to be zygomorphic, which literally means "yoke-shaped".

== See also ==
- Branches of botany
- Floral formula
- Glossary of biology
- Glossary of plant morphology
- Glossary of leaf morphology
- Glossary of lichen terms
- Glossary of mycology
- Glossary of scientific naming
- Plant morphology

== Bibliography ==
- Allaby, Michael (2012). A Dictionary of Plant Sciences. Oxford University Press. ISBN 978-0-19-960057-1 – via Google Books (preview only).
- Beach, Chandler B., ed. (1914a). "Tetrad". The New Student's Reference Work. Chicago: F. E. Compton and Co.
- Beach, Chandler B., ed. (1914b). "Tetraspore". The New Student's Reference Work. Chicago: F. E. Compton and Co.
- Beentje, Henk (2010). The Kew Plant Glossary, an Illustrated Dictionary of Plant Terms. Richmond, London: Kew Publishing. ISBN 978-1-84246-422-9.
- Brodie, Harold J. (May 1951). "The splash-cup dispersal mechanism in plants". Canadian Journal of Botany. 29 (3). Ottawa, Ontario: Canadian Science Publishing: 224–234. Bibcode:1951CaJB...29..224B. doi:10.1139/b51-022.
- Cappers, René T.J.; Neef, Reinder (2012). Handbook of Plant Palaeoecology. Barkuis Publishing. ISBN 9789492444264 – via Google Books (preview only).
- Carolin, Roger C.; Tindale, Mary D. (1994). Flora of the Sydney Region (4th ed.). Chatswood, NSW: Reed. ISBN 0730104001. OCLC 32821788.
- Don, George (1831). A General History of Dichlamydeous Plants...Arranged According to the Natural System. Vol. 1. London – via Biodiversity Heritage Library.
- Eckenwalder, James E. (2009). Conifers of the World: the Complete Reference. London: Timber Press. ISBN 978-0-88192-974-4.
- Gifford, Ernest M.; Foster, Adriance S. (1989). Morphology and Evolution of Vascular Plants (3rd ed.). W. H. Freeman. ISBN 978-0-7167-1946-5.
- Glover, Beverley J. (2007). Understanding Flowers and Flowering: An Integrated Approach. Oxford: Oxford university press. ISBN 978-0-19-856596-3. OCLC 153553887.
- Hanzawa, Frances M.; Beattie, Andrew J.; Holmes, Anne (November 1985). "Dual function of the elaiosome of Corydalis aurea (Fumariaceae): attraction of dispersal agents and repulsion of Peromyscus maniculatus, a seed predator". American Journal of Botany. 72 (11). St. Louis, Missouri: Botanical Society of America: 1707–1711. Bibcode:1985AmJB...72.1707H. doi:10.1002/j.1537-2197.1985.tb08442.x. JSTOR 2443727.
- Harris, James G.; Harris, Melinda Woolf (2001). Plant Identification Terminology: an Illustrated Glossary (2nd ed.). Spring Lake, Utah, US: Spring Lake Publishing. ISBN 0-9640221-6-8.
- Hickey, Michael; King, Clive (2000). The Cambridge Illustrated Glossary of Botanical Terms. Cambridge, England: Cambridge University Press. ISBN 978-0-521-79401-5 – via Google Books.
- Hughes, Colin (2017). "About the Field Guides Project". The Virtual Field Herbarium (herbaria-old.plants.ox.ac.uk). Oxford University Herbaria. Archived from the original on 5 March 2017.
- * "Plant Characteristics". The Virtual Field Herbarium (herbaria-old.plants.ox.ac.uk). Archived from the original on 5 March 2017. In Hughes (2017).
- IPNI (2022). "Rosaceae Juss., Gen. Pl. [Jussieu] 334 (1789), nom. cons". International Plant Names Index (IPNI). Royal Botanic Gardens, Kew; Harvard University Herbaria & Libraries; Australian National Botanic Gardens.
- Jackson, Benjamin Daydon (1928). A Glossary of Botanic Terms with their Derivation and Accent. New York: Hafner Publishing Co. Inc – via Biodiversity Heritage Library.
- Jaeger, Edmund Carroll (1959). A Source-book of Biological Names and Terms. Springfield, Illinois, US: Thomas. ISBN 978-0-398-06179-1 – via Internet Archive.
- Kucewicz, Magdalena; Maćkiewicz, Katarzyna; Źróbek-Sokolnik, Anna (2010). "Selected aspects of tiny vetch [Vicia hirsuta (L.) Gray S.F.] seed ecology: generative reproduction and effects of seed maturity and seed storage on seed germination". Acta Agrobotanica. 63 (1). Warsaw: Polish Botanical Society: 205–212. doi:10.5586/aa.2010.023. S2CID 84871256.
- Lellinger, David B. (2002). A Modern Multilingual Glossary for Taxonomic Pteridology (Pteridologia) (in English, Spanish, French, and Portuguese). Vol. 3. American Fern Society, Inc. ISBN 978-0-933500-02-0 – via Biodiversity Heritage Library.
- Mandal, R. N.; Bar, R. (2018). Mangroves for Building Resilience to Climate Change. CRC Press. ISBN 9780429946974 – via Google Books.
- Meerow, Alan W.; Fay, Michael F.; Guy, Charles L.; Li, Qin-Bao; Zaman, Faridah Q.; Chase, Mark W. (September 1999). "Systematics of Amaryllidaceae based on cladistic analysis of plastid sequence data". American Journal of Botany. 86 (9). St. Louis, Missouri: Botanical Society of America: 1325–1345. doi:10.2307/2656780. JSTOR 2656780. PMID 10487820.
- Mitchell, Alan (1972). Conifers in the British Isles. A Descriptive Handbook (PDF). Forestry Commission Booklet 33. illustrated by Christine Darter. London: Her Majesty's Stationery Office. Archived from the original (PDF) on 27 August 2016.
- Mitchell, Alan F. (1974). A Field Guide to the Trees of Britain and Northern Europe. London: Collins. ISBN 0-00-212035-6.
- Neotropikey (2017). "Glossary of Botanical Terms". www.kew.org. Royal Botanic Gardens, Kew. Archived from the original on 21 January 2017.
- New Shorter Oxford English Dictionary on Historical Principles (A–M). Vol. 1 (6th ed.). Oxford, England: Oxford University Press. 2007. ISBN 978-0-19-920687-2 – via Internet Archive.
- New Shorter Oxford English Dictionary on Historical Principles (N–Z). Vol. 2 (6th ed.). Oxford, England: Oxford University Press. 2007. ISBN 978-0-19-920687-2 – via Internet Archive.
- NYBG (2019). "Glossary for Vascular Plants". The William & Lynda Steere Herbarium, New York Botanical Garden.
- Pell, Susan K.; Angell, Bobbi (2016). A Botanist's Vocabulary: 1300 Terms Explained and Illustrated. Portland, Oregon, US: Timber Press. ISBN 978-1-604-69563-2.
- Rendle, Alfred Barton (1911). "Fruit". In Chisholm, Hugh (ed.). Encyclopædia Britannica. Vol. 11 (11th ed.). Cambridge University Press. pp. 257–258.
- Schulze, Ernst-Detlef; Zwölfer, Helmut, eds. (2012). Potentials and Limitations of Ecosystem Analysis, Extinction and Naturalization of Plant Species. Springer Berlin Heidelberg. ISBN 9783642716300 – via Google Books (preview only).
- Shreve, Forrest; Wiggins, Ira L. (1964). Vegetation and Flora of the Sonoran Desert. Vol. 1. Stanford, California, US: Stanford University Press. ISBN 9780804701631. OCLC 710084 – via Internet Archive.
- Simpson, Michael G. (August 2011). Plant Systematics. Academic Press. ISBN 978-0-08-051404-8 – via Google Books (preview only).
- Sims, John (1803). Curtis's Botanical Magazine, Or, Flower-garden Displayed: In which the Most Ornamental Foreign Plants, Cultivated in the Open Ground, the Green-house, and the Stove, are Accurately Represented in Their Natural Colours ... Vol. 17. London: T. Curtis – via Google Books.
- Stearn, William T. (1983). Botanical Latin (3rd ed.). Newton Abbot & London & North Pomfret, Vermont, US: David & Charles. ISBN 0-7153-8548-8 – via Internet Archive.
- Turland, N.J.; Wiersema, J.H.; Barrie, F.R.; Greuter, W.; Hawksworth, D.L.; Herendeen, P.S.; Knapp, S.; Kusber, W.-H.; Li, D.-Z.; Marhold, K.; May, T.W.; McNeill, J.; Monro, A.M.; Prado, J.; Price, M.J.; Smith, G.F., eds. (2018). International Code of Nomenclature for algae, fungi, and plants (Shenzhen Code) adopted by the Nineteenth International Botanical Congress Shenzhen, China, July 2017. Regnum Vegetabile. Vol. 159. Glashütten, Germany: Koeltz Botanical Books. doi:10.12705/Code.2018. hdl:10141/622572. ISBN 978-3-946583-16-5. OCLC 1043552267.
