= Alarm photosynthesis =

Variation of photosynthesis

Alarm photosynthesis is a variation of photosynthesis where calcium oxalate crystals function as dynamic carbon pools, supplying carbon dioxide (CO_{2}) to photosynthetic cells when stomata are partially or totally closed. This biochemical appendance of the photosynthetic machinery is a means to alleviate the perpetual plant dilemma of using atmospheric CO_{2} for photosynthesis and losing water vapor, or saving water and reducing photosynthesis. The function of alarm photosynthesis seems to be rather auxiliary to the overall photosynthetic performance. It supports a low photosynthetic rate, aiming at the maintenance and photoprotection of the photosynthetic apparatus rather than a substantial carbon gain.

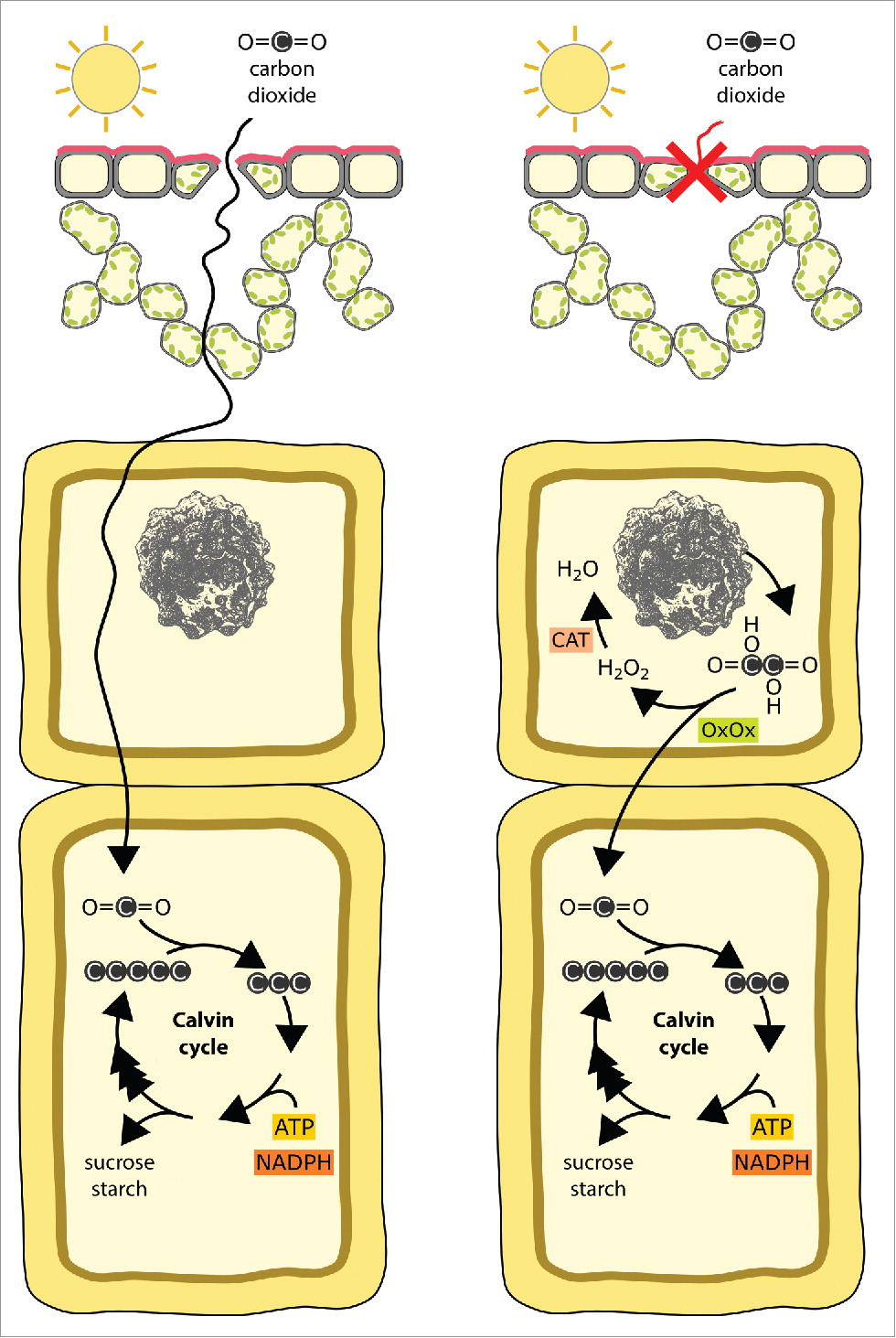

== History ==
The alarm photosynthesis process was first evidenced in pigweed Amaranthus hybridus plant in 2016 when A. hybridus leaves were exposed to drought conditions or exogenous application of abscisic acid. The same study showed similar results in Dianthus chinensis, Pelargonium peltatum, and Portulacaria afra plants under drought stress. In 2018, the alarm photosynthesis process was exhibited in A. hybridus plants under controlled CO_{2} starvation conditions. In 2020, evidence of this process was shown in the Antarctic extremophile plant Colobanthus quitensis under CO_{2} limiting conditions.

== Mechanism ==
Under stress conditions (e.g. water deficit) oxalate released from calcium oxalate crystals is converted to CO_{2} by an oxalate oxidase enzyme and the produced CO_{2} can support the Calvin cycle reactions. Reactive hydrogen peroxide (H_{2}O_{2}), the byproduct of oxalate oxidase reaction, can be neutralized by catalase.

=== Differences against CAM and C4 ===
Alarm photosynthesis represents an unknown photosynthetic variation to be added to the already known C4 and CAM pathways. However, alarm photosynthesis, in contrast to these pathways, operates as a biochemical pump that collects carbon from the organ interior (or from the soil) and not from the atmosphere.

== See also ==
- Photosynthesis
- Crassulacean acid metabolism
- C4 carbon fixation
- C3 carbon fixation
