= Phytolith =

Rigid structures found in some plants

Phytolith structures

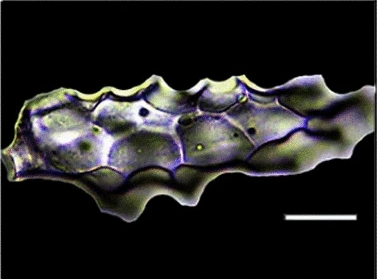
Phytolith from the tree Pittosporum truncatum

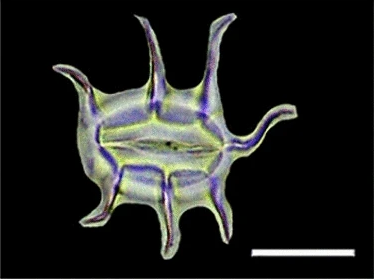
Phytolith from the tree Paulownia fargesii

Contrasting phytolith forms found on leaved trees
scale bars 20 μm

Phytoliths (from Greek, "plant stone") are rigid, microscopic mineral deposits found in some plant tissues, often persisting after the decay of the plant. Although some use "phytolith" to refer to all mineral secretions by plants, it more commonly refers to siliceous plant remains. Phytoliths come in varying shapes and sizes. The plants which exhibit them take up dissolved silica from the groundwater, whereupon it is deposited within different intracellular and extracellular structures of the plant.

The silica is absorbed in the form of monosilicic acid (Si(OH)_{4}), and is carried by the plant's vascular system to the cell walls, cell lumen, and intercellular spaces. Depending on the plant taxa and soil condition, absorbed silica can range from 0.1% to 10% of the plant's total dry weight. When deposited, the silica replicates the structure of the cells, providing structural support to the plant. Phytoliths strengthen the plant against abiotic stressors such as salt runoff, metal toxicity, and extreme temperatures. Phytoliths can also protect the plant against biotic threats such as insects and fungal diseases.

== Functions ==
There is still debate in the scientific community as to why plants form phytoliths, and whether silica should be considered an essential nutrient for plants. Studies that have grown plants in silica-free environments have typically found that plants lacking silica in the environment do not grow well. For example, the stems of certain plants will collapse when grown in soil lacking silica. In many cases, phytoliths appear to lend structure and support to the plant, much like the spicules in sponges and leather corals. Phytoliths may also provide plants with protection. These rigid silica structures help to make plants more difficult to consume and digest, lending the plant's tissues a grainy or prickly texture. Phytoliths also appear to provide physiologic benefits. Experimental studies have shown that the silicon dioxide in phytoliths may help to alleviate the damaging effects of toxic heavy metals, such as aluminum. Finally, calcium oxalates serve as a reserve of carbon dioxide in Alarm photosynthesis. Cacti use these as a reserve for photosynthesis during the day when they close their pores to avoid water loss; baobabs use this property to make their trunks more flame-resistant.

== History of phytolith research ==
According to Dolores Piperno, an expert in the field of phytolith analysis, there have been four important stages of phytolith research throughout history.

1. Discovery and exploratory stage (1835–1895): The first report on phytoliths was published by a German botanist named Gustav Adolph Struve in 1835. During this time another German scientist named Christian Gottfried Ehrenberg was one of the leaders in the field of phytolith analysis. He developed the first classification system for phytoliths, and analyzed soil samples that were sent to him from all around the world. Most notably, Ehrenberg recorded phytoliths in samples he received from the famous naturalist, Charles Darwin, who had collected the dust from the sails of his ship, HMS Beagle, off the coast of the Cape Verde Islands.
2. Botanical phase of research (1895–1936): Phytolith structures in plants gained wide recognition and attention throughout Europe. Research on production, taxonomy and morphology exploded. Detailed notes and drawings on plant families that produce silica structures and morphology within families were published.
3. Period of ecological research (1955–1975): First applications of phytolith analysis to paleoecological work, mostly in Australia, the United States, the United Kingdom, and Russia. Classification systems for differentiation within plant families became popular.
4. Modern period of archaeological and paleoenvironmental research (1978–present): Archaeobotanists working in the Americas first consider and analyze phytolith assemblages in order to track prehistoric plant use and domestication. Also for the first time, phytolith data from pottery are used to track history of clay procurement and pottery manufacture. Around the same time, phytolith data are also used as a means of vegetation reconstruction among paleoecologists. A much larger reference collection on phytolith morphology within varying plant families is assembled.

== Development in plants ==
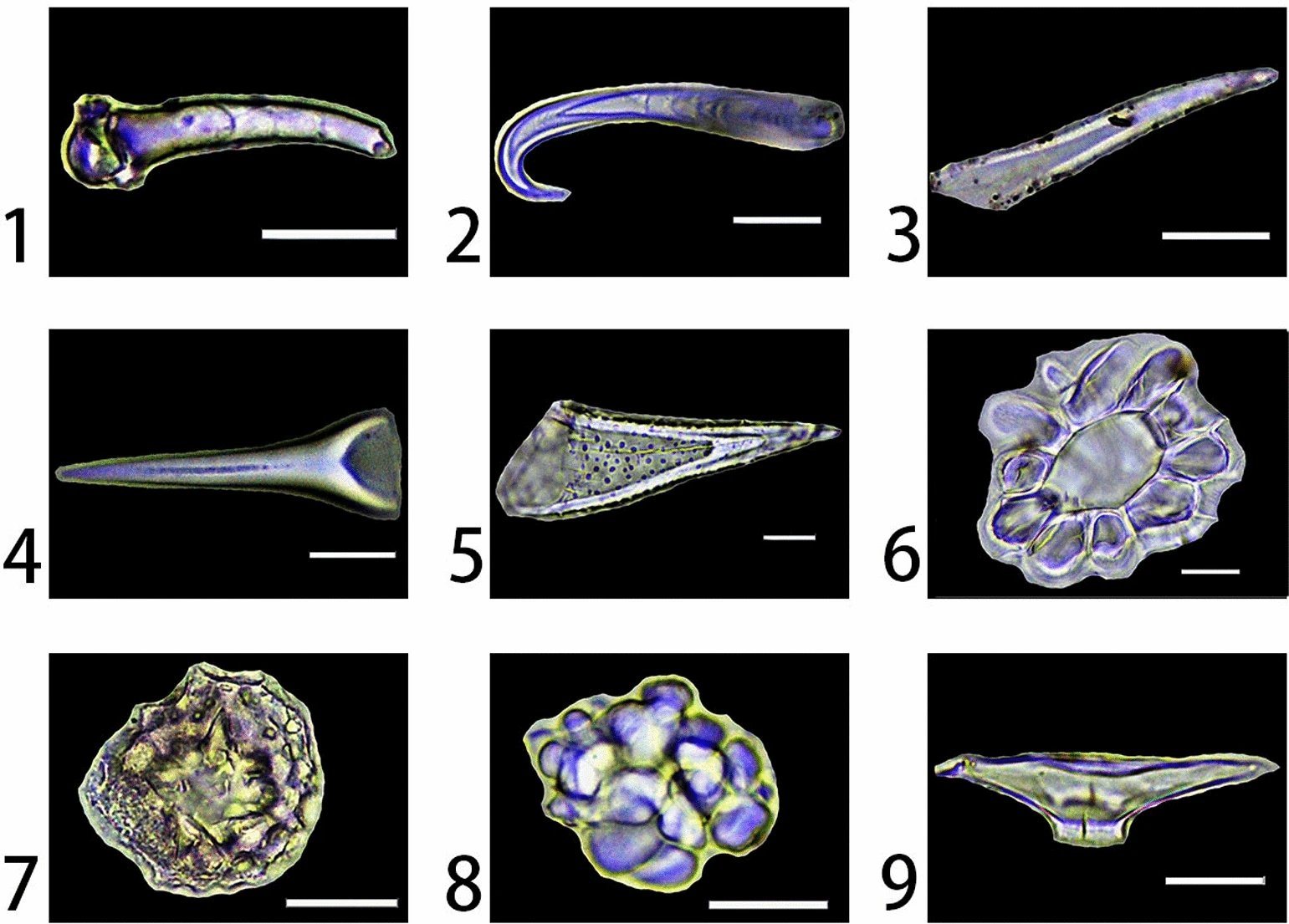
Types of phytoliths found on broad-leaved trees in China Scale bars are 20 μm

Soluble silica, also called monosilicic or orthosilicic acid with a chemical formula of (Si(OH)4), is taken up from the soil when plant roots absorb groundwater. From there, it is carried to other plant organs by the xylem. By an unknown mechanism, which appears to be linked to genetics and metabolism, some of the silica is then laid down in the plant as silicon dioxide. This biological mechanism does not appear to be limited to specific plant structures, as some plants have been found with silica in their reproductive and sub-surface organs.

=== Chemical and physical characteristics ===
Phytoliths are composed mainly of noncrystalline silicon dioxide, and about 4% to 9% of their mass is water. Carbon, nitrogen, and other major nutrient elements comprise less than 5%, and commonly less than 1%, of phytolith material by mass. These elements are present in the living cells in which the silica concretions form, so traces are retained in the phytoliths. Such immobilised elements, in particular carbon, are valuable in that they permit radiometric dating in reconstructing past vegetation patterns. The silica in phytoliths has a refractive index ranging from 1.41 to 1.47, and a specific gravity from 1.5 to 2.3. Phytoliths may be colorless, light brown, or opaque; most are transparent. Phytoliths exist in various three-dimensional shapes, some of which are specific to plant families, genera or species.

=== Single cell and conjoined phytoliths ===
Phytoliths may form within single cells, or multiple cells within a plant to form 'conjoined' or multi-cell phytoliths, which are three-dimensional replicas of sections of plant tissue. Conjoined phytoliths occur when conditions are particularly favourable for phytolith formation, such as on a silica rich substrate with high water availability

=== Pathogenic stress on phytolith formation ===
Silica is not considered an essential nutrient for plants such as nitrogen or phosphorus. However, silica-aided phytoliths can help a plant be more resilient against biotic and abiotic stressors. Silica is bioactive, meaning it is able to change the expression of certain plant genes to jumpstart a defensive response against these stressors. In terms of fungal infections, the deposition of silica has been shown to create a physical barrier between invading fungi and the plant. Some factors however can have very damaging effects on the plant and limit or alter phytolith production.

In 2009, researchers at the Rock Springs Agricultural Experiment Station at The Pennsylvania State University investigated the effects of pathogenic viruses on phytolith production in Cucurbita pepo var. Texana. The plants that were affected by either mosaic virus (carried by aphids) or bacterial wilt disease (carried by cucumber beetles) were infected on their own to replicate natural conditions and all plants were grouped into three categories: healthy plants sprayed to prevent insect herbivory, plants infected with mosaic disease, and plants infected with bacterial wilt disease.

Analysis after harvest yielded 1,072 phytoliths from forty-five plants. Plants affected by mosaic disease experienced a decrease in phytolith size. This is because the virus constricts overall plant growth and therefore phytolith growth as well. Contrastingly, plants affected with bacterial wilt disease resulted in much larger phytoliths but they were abnormally shaped. This could be due to the bacteria causing constriction of the hypodermal cells, causing an influx of silica deposits.

=== Patterns of phytolith production ===
Because identification of phytoliths is based on morphology, taxonomical differences in phytolith production are important.

Families with high phytolith production; family and genus-specific phytolith morphology is common:

- Acanthaceae, Aceraceae, Annonaceae, Arecaceae, Asteraceae, Boraginaceae, Bromeliaceae, Burseraceae, Chrysobalanaceae, Commelinaceae, Costaceae, Cucurbitaceae, Cyatheaceae, Cyperaceae, Dilleniaceae, Equisetaceae, Heliconiaceae, Hymenophyllaceae, Magnoliaceae, Marantaceae, Moraceae, Musaceae, Orchidaceae, Poaceae, Podostemaceae, Selaginellaceae, Ulmaceae, Urticaceae, Zingiberaceae

Families where phytolith production may not be high; family and genus-specific phytolith morphology is common:

- Capparaceae, Cupressaceae, Dipterocarpaceae, Euphorbiaceae, Fagaceae, Flacourtiaceae, Flagellariaceae, Joinvilleaceae, Pinaceae, Polypodiaceae, Restionaceae, Taxaceae, Taxodiaceae

Families where phytolith production is common; family and genus-specific phytolith morphology is uncommon:

- Aristolochiaceae, Chloranthaceae, Combretaceae, Hernandiaceae, Loranthaceae, Menispermaceae, Piperaceae, Sapotaceae, Verbenaceae

Families where phytolith productions varies; family and genus-specific phytolith morphology is uncommon:

- Clusiaceae, Fabaceae, Malvaceae, Sterculiaceae

Families where phytolith production is rare or not observed:

- Agavaceae, Alismataceae, Amaranthaceae, Amaryllidaceae, Apiaceae, Apocynaceae, Araceae, Araliaceae, Araucariaceae, Asclepiadaceae, Bignoniaceae, Bixaceae, Bombacaceae, Brassicaceae, Burmanniaceae, Cactaceae, Campanulaceae, Caricaceae, Cartonemataceae, Chenopodiaceae, Convolvulaceae, Cycadaceae, Cyclanthaceae, Dioscoreaceae, Ericaceae, Eriocaulaceae, Gnetaceae, Guttiferae, Hydrocharitaceae, Iridaceae, Juglandaceae, Juncaceae, Labiatae, Lacistemataceae, Lauraceae, Lecythidaceae, Lentibulariaceae, Liliaceae, Loganiaceae, Malpighiaceae, Mayacaceae, Melastomataceae, Meliaceae, Myristicaceae, Myrtaceae, Myrsinaceae, Nymphaeaceae, Olacaceae, Oxalidaceae, Pedaliaceae, Podocarpaceae, Polygonaceae, Pontederiaceae, Potamogetonaceae, Primulaceae, Proteaceae, Ranunculaceae, Rhamnaceae, Rosaceae, Rubiaceae, Rutaceae, Salicaceae, Sapindaceae, Saxifragaceae, Smilacaceae, Solanaceae, Theaceae, Tiliaceae, Triuridaceae, Typhaceae, Vitaceae, Violaceae, Winteraceae, Xyridaceae, Zygophyllaceae

== Archaeology ==
Phytoliths are very robust, and are useful in archaeology because they can help to reconstruct the plants present at a site when the rest of the plant parts have been burned up or dissolved. Because they are made of the inorganic substances silica or calcium oxalate, phytoliths don't decay with the rest of the plant and can survive in conditions that would destroy organic residues. Phytoliths can provide evidence of both economically important plants and those that are indicative of the environment at a particular time period.

Phytoliths may be extracted from residue on many sources: dental calculus (buildup on teeth); food preparation tools like rocks, grinders, and scrapers; cooking or storage containers; ritual offerings; and garden areas.

=== Sampling strategies ===
There are several things to be taken into consideration when designing a sampling strategy:

1. Cultural contexts: The most important consideration when designing a sampling strategy for a cultural context is to fit the sampling design to the research objectives. For example, if the objective of the study is to identify activity areas, it may be ideal to sample using a grid system. If the objective is to identify foodstuffs, it may be more beneficial to focus on areas where food processing and consumption took place. It is always beneficial to sample ubiquitously throughout the site, because it is always possible to select a smaller portion of the samples for analysis from a larger collection. Samples should be collected and labeled in individual plastic bags. It is not necessary to freeze the samples, or treat them in any special way because silica is not subject to decay by microorganisms.
2. Natural contexts: Sampling a natural context, typically for the purpose of environmental reconstruction, should be done in a context that is free of disturbances. Human activity can alter the makeup of samples of local vegetation, so sites with evidence of human occupation should be avoided. Bottom deposits of lakes are usually a good context for phytolith samples, because wind often will carry phytoliths from the topsoil and deposit them on water, where they will sink to the bottom, very similar to pollen. It is also possible and desirable to take vertical samples of phytolith data, as it can be a good indicator of changing frequencies of taxa over time.
3. Modern surfaces: Sampling modern surfaces for use with archeobotanical data may be used to create a reference collection, if the taxa being sampled are known. It may also serve to "detect downward movement of phytoliths into archaeological strata". Taking point samples for modern contexts is ideal.

=== Laboratory analysis ===
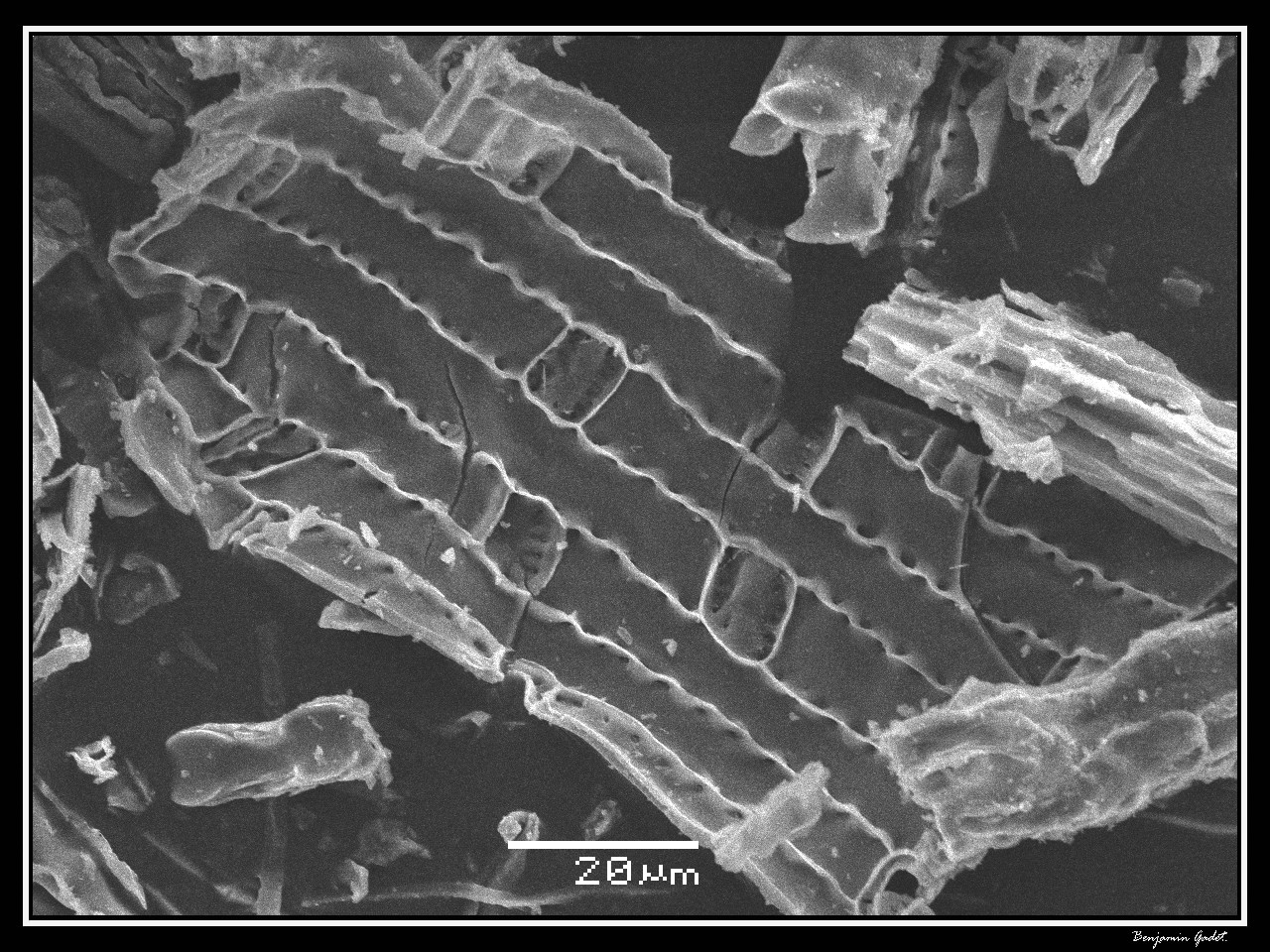
Elephant grass phytolith processed by dry ashing

The first step in extracting phytoliths from the soil matrix involves removing all non-soil and non-sediment material. This can include stone or bone tools, teeth, or other various prehistoric artifacts. Clay has a strong ability for holding onto phytoliths and also must be removed using a centrifuge technique. Once the sample is left to only house soil and sediment components, phytoliths can be separated through a variety of techniques. Pressurized microwave extraction is a fast method but does not produce as pure of results as other methods. Dry ashing tends to break up phytoliths better than wet ashing. Ethanol can also be added to the sample and lit on fire, leaving only the phytoliths behind

One of the most effective methods of phytolith isolation is heavy liquid flotation. Over time, different liquids have been utilized as technology changes, each still carrying different advantages and disadvantages to the separation process. Current liquids used include zinc bromide, hydrochloric acid, or sodium polytungstate which are added to the sample. After flotation occurs, the separated phytoliths and liquid are moved to another container where water is added. This lowers the solution's density, causing the phytoliths to sink to the bottom of the container. The phytoliths are removed and rinsed several times to ensure all of the flotation solvent has been removed and they are placed in storage. Phytoliths can either be stored in a dry setting or in ethanol to prevent abrasion.

When examining the sample, polarized light microscopy, simple light microscopy, phase contrast microscopy, or scanning electron microscopy can be used. The sample should be placed in a mounting media on the slide which can be Canada Balsam, Benzyl Benzoate, silicon oil, glycerin, or water. The target phytolith count is dependent on the objectives, research design, and conditions of the archaeological site from which they were obtained. However, a count of two hundred phytoliths are recommended as a good starting point. If the conditions warrant, more should be counted. It is still not possible to isolate plant DNA from extracted phytoliths.

==== Burned phytoliths ====
When looking at a phytolith through a microscope lens, it will usually appear clear against the microscope's light. However phytoliths dark in color are found in the archeological record; these phytoliths display evidence of fire exposure. Gradation of darkness can be used to calculate past environmental fires. Darker phytoliths are correlated with higher carbon residue and fires with higher temperatures which can be measured on the Burnt Phytolith Index (BPI). Burned phytoliths can also appear melted in addition to darkened color.

Fires which cause burned phytoliths can be ignited by anthropogenic or non-anthropogenic sources and can be determined through charcoal and burned phytolith analysis. It is believed that during prehistoric times, an increase in intensive land use such as through agriculture, caused an increase in anthropogenic fires while non-anthropogenic fires could have resulted from lightning strikes. Fire intensity depends on available biomass which usually peaks in the dry, fall season.

=== Contribution to archaeobotanical knowledge ===
- Phytolith analysis is particularly useful in tropical regions, where other types of plant remains are typically not well preserved.
- Phytolith analysis has been used to retrace the domestication and ancestral lineage of various plants. For example, research tracing modern lineages of maize (Zea mays) in South America and the American Southwest using phytolith remains on ceramics and pottery has proven to be enlightening. Recent genetic data suggests that the oldest ancestor of Zea mays is teosinte, a wild grass found in southwest Mexico. The Zea mays lineage split off from this grass about six to seven thousand years ago. Phytolith analyses from Bolivia suggest that several varieties of maize were present in the Lake Titicaca region of Bolivia almost 1000 years before the Tiwanaku expansion, when it was previously thought to have been introduced in the region. This case is not isolated. Around the same time, certain varieties of maize could be found with ubiquity across part of South America, suggesting a highly frequented and established trade route existed. Phytolith data from the southeastern United States suggest that two different lineages of maize were introduced from two different sources. Research that hopes to discover more specific information about the spread of maize throughout the southeastern United States is currently under way.
- To date, phytolith analyses have also been popular for studies of rice. Because the morphology of rice phytoliths has been significantly documented, studies concerning the domestication of rice, as well as crop processing models using phytolith analyses, are insightful. In one study, phytolith analysis was used to complement macro-remains sampling in order to infer concentrations of plant parts and predict crop processing stages.
- Phytolith analysis has been useful in identifying early agriculture in South East Asia during the Early Holocene.

=== Tracing the history of plant-human interactions ===
- Jigsaw puzzle-shaped phytoliths observed from sites in Greece but not from Israel may relate to climatic difference, possibly relating to irrigation performed for legume plant management.
- Cucurbita (squash and gourd) phytolith data from early Holocene sites in Ecuador indicate that the plant food production occurred across lowland South America independent from Mesoamerica.

=== Problems with phytolith analysis of remains ===
1. Multiplicity: different parts of a single plant may produce different phytoliths.
2. Redundancy: different plants can produce the same kind of phytolith.
3. Some plants produce large numbers of phytoliths while others produce only few.

Taxonomic resolution issues deriving from the multiplicity and redundancy problems can be dealt with by integrating phytolith analysis with other areas, such as micromorphology and morphometric approaches used in soil analysis. It is suggested that using phytolith data from food residues (on ceramics, usually) can decrease the bias from both of these problems, because phytolith analysis is more likely to represent crop products and identification of phytoliths can be made with more confidence. Also, food residues do not usually accumulate extraneous deposits. In other words, the samples are more likely to represent a primary context.

== Palaeontology and paleoenvironmental reconstructions ==
Phytoliths occur abundantly in the fossil record, and have been reported from the Late Devonian onwards. Robustness of phytoliths make them available to be found in various remains including sedimentary deposits, coprolites, and dental calculus from diverse environmental conditions. In addition to reconstructing human-plant interactions since the Pleistocene, phytoliths can be used to identify palaeoenvironments and to track vegetational change. More and more studies are acknowledging phytolith records as a valuable tool for reconstructing pre-Quaternary vegetation changes (e.g.,). Occasionally, paleontologists find and identify phytoliths associated with extinct plant-eating animals (i.e. herbivores). Findings such as these reveal useful information about the diet of these extinct animals, and also shed light on the evolutionary history of many different types of plants. Paleontologists in India have recently identified grass phytoliths in dinosaur dung (coprolites), strongly suggesting that the evolution of grasses began earlier than previously thought.

Phytolith records in the context of the global silica cycle, along with CO_{2} concentrations and other paleoclimatological records, can help constrain estimates of certain long-term terrestrial, biogeochemical cycles and interrelated climate changes.

Light intensity (e.g., open versus closed canopies) can affect cell morphology, especially cell length and area, which can be measured from phytolith fossils. These can be useful for tracing fluctuations in the ancient light regime and canopy cover.

Freshwater oases and related landscape changes that could have affected plant-human interactions were reconstructed through synthesizing phytolith, pollen, and paleoenvironmental data in the well-known early hominin site of Olduvai Gorge in Tanzania.

Comparisons between paleorecords of phytolith remains and modern reference remains in the same region can aid reconstructing how plant composition and related environments changed over time.

Though further testing is required, evolution and development of phytoliths in vascular plants seem to be related to certain types of plant-animal interactions in which phytoliths function as a defensive mechanism for herbivores or related to adaptive changes to habitats.

Japanese and Korean archaeologists refer to grass and crop plant phytoliths as "plant opal" in archaeological literature.

== Gallery ==
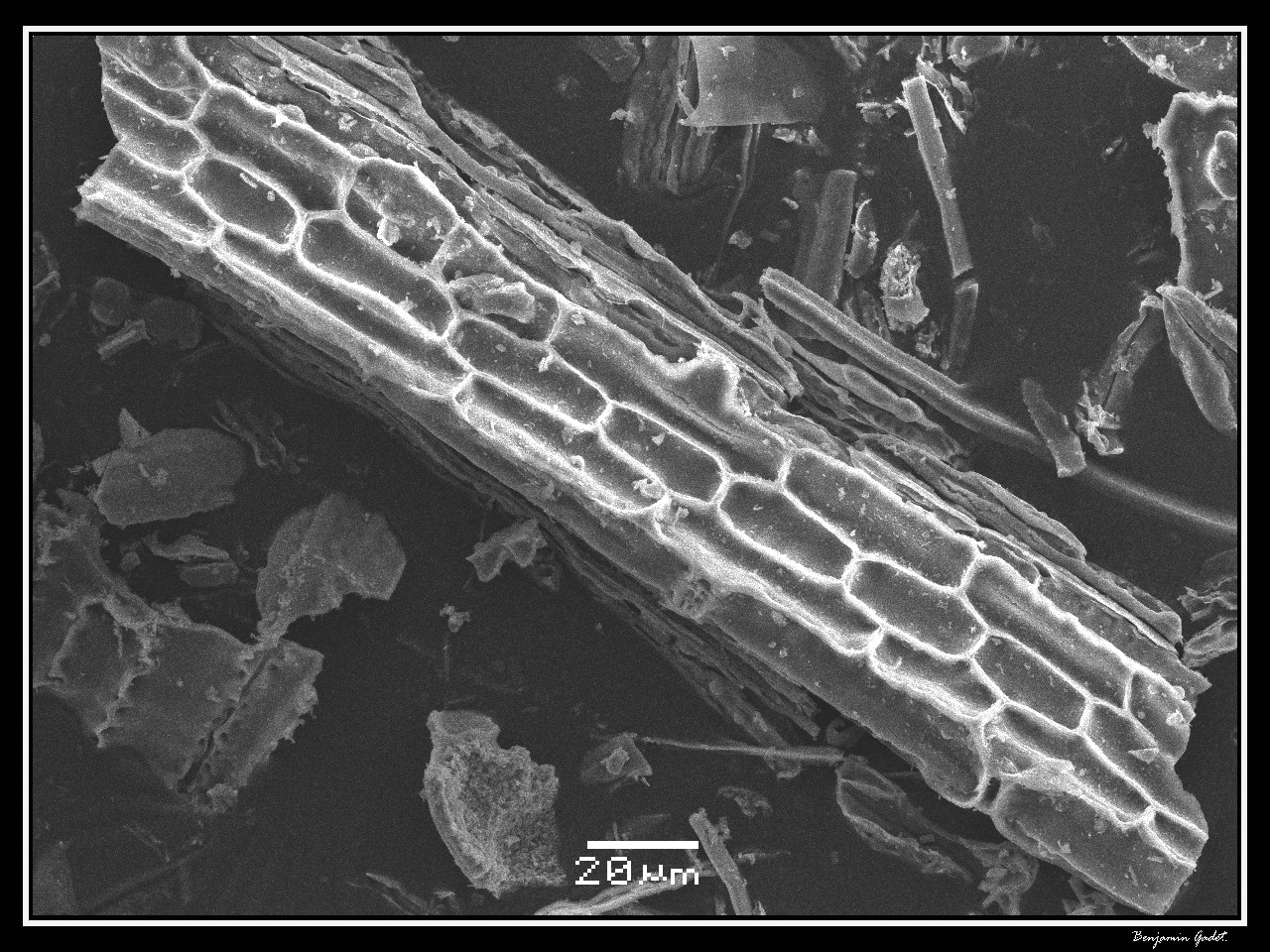

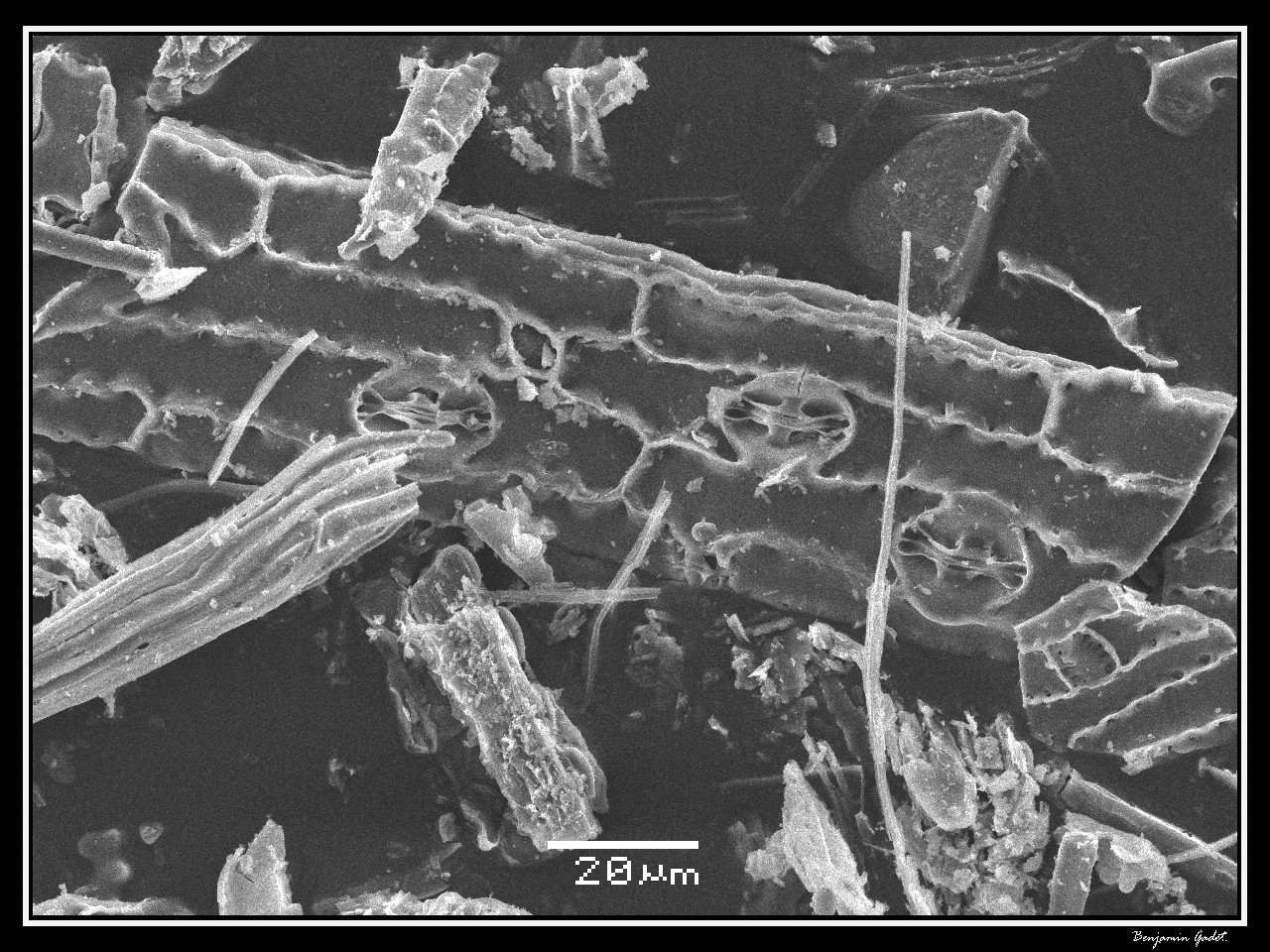

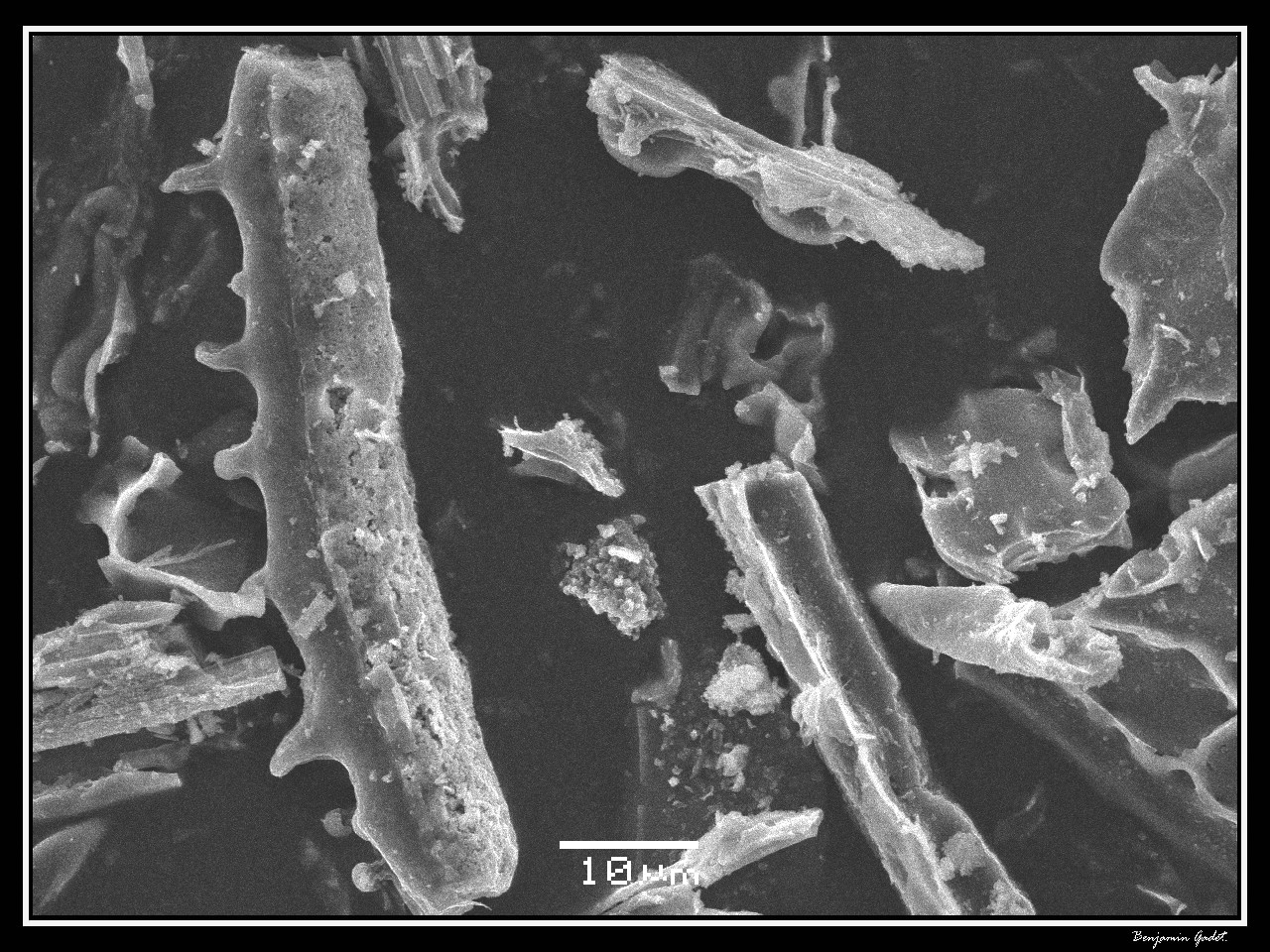

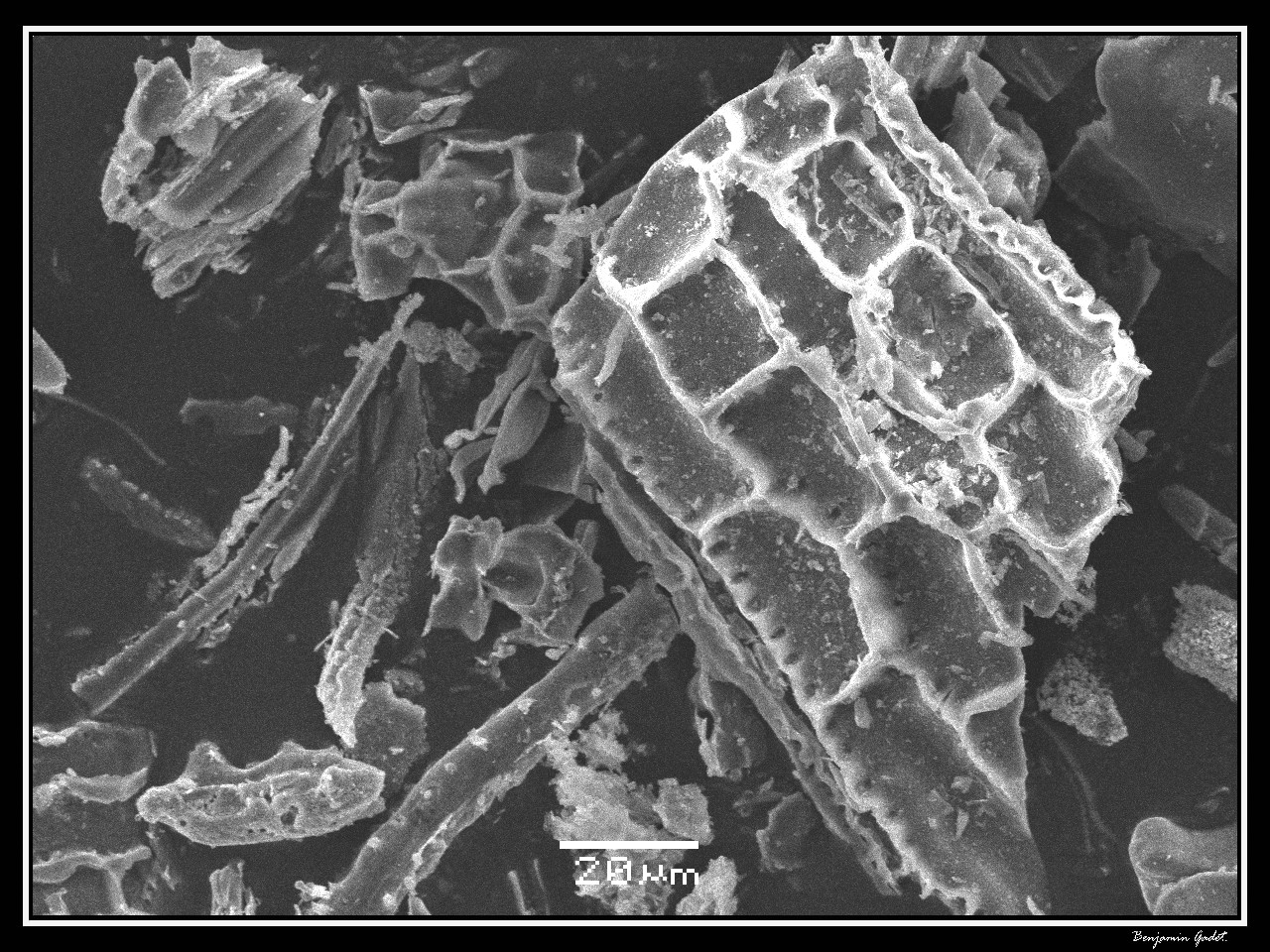

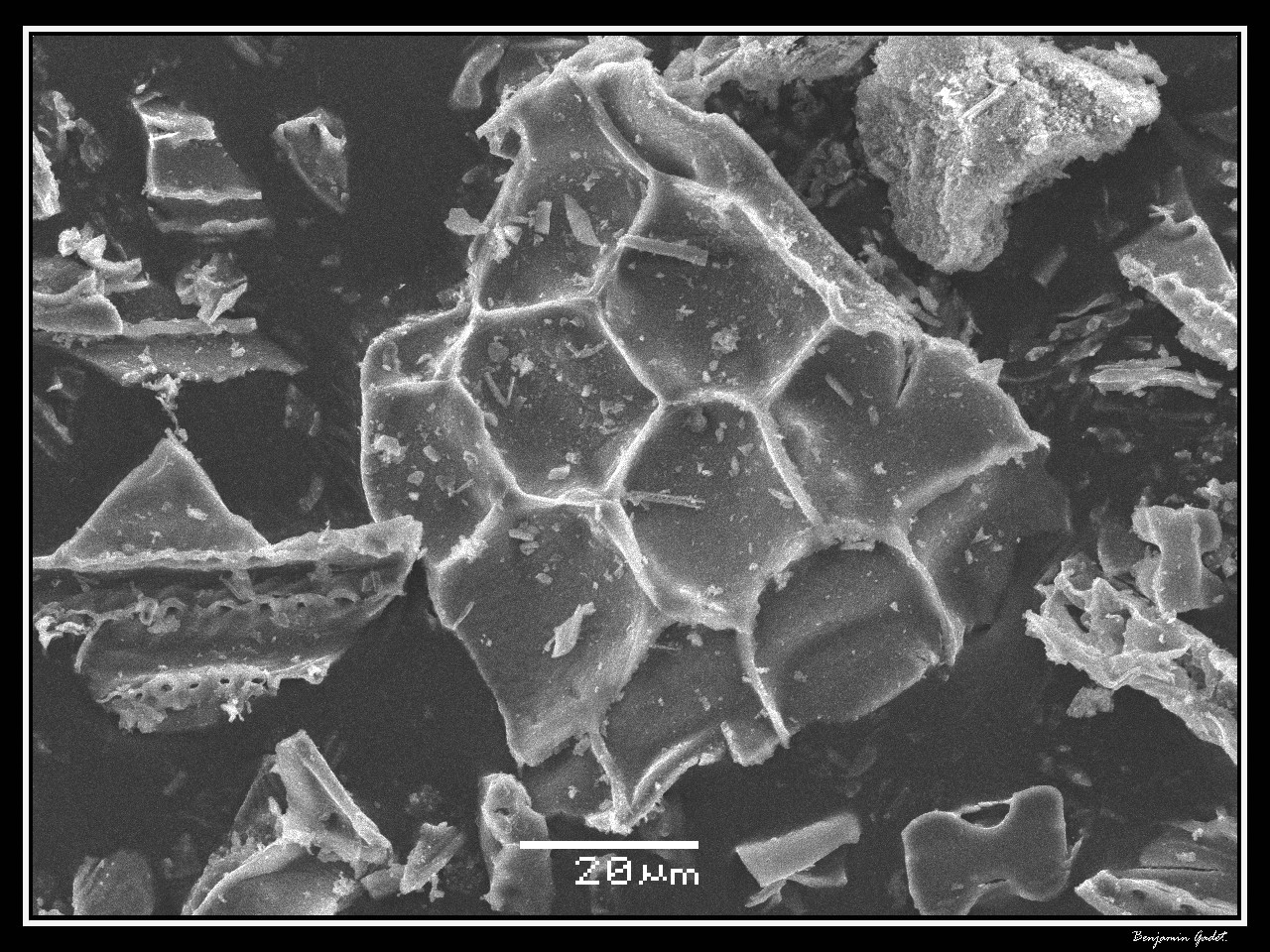

For extended examples of phytolith taxonomy, see the University of Sheffield's comprehensive Phytolith Interpretation page.

== Carbon sequestration ==
Research, particularly since 2005 has shown that carbon in phytoliths can be resistant to decomposition for millennia and can accumulate in soils. While researchers had previously known that phytoliths could persist in some soils for thousands of years and that there was carbon occluded within phytoliths that could be used for radiocarbon dating, research into the capacity of phytoliths as a method of storing carbon in soils was pioneered by Parr and Sullivan who suggested that there was a real opportunity to sequester carbon securely in soils for the long term, in the form of carbon inclusions in durable silica phytoliths.

During the mineralization process which creates the phytolith, many different nutrients are absorbed from the soil including carbon which forms Phytolith Occluded Carbon (PhytOC). Phytoliths are able to hold PhytOC in the soil for thousands of years, much longer than other organic methods. While this yields phytoliths as an important area of study regarding carbon sequestration, not all plant species produce analogous results. For example, phytoliths derived from oats can hold 5.0% to 5.8% carbon while sugarcane phytoliths can yield 3.88% to 19.26% carbon. Different species and subspecies hold different carbon storage potential within the silica rather than within the plant itself. Therefore, total PhytOC sequester largely depends on the condition of the biome such as grassland, forest, or cropland, and is influenced by climate and soil conditions. Proper upkeep of these ecosystems can boost biomass production and therefore more silica and carbon uptake. Proper conservation methods could include controlled grazing or fires.

While carbon sequestration is a potentially important way to limit atmospheric greenhouse gas concentrations in the long term, the use of phytoliths to achieve this must be balanced against other uses that might be made of the same biomass carbon (or land for producing biomass) to reduce Greenhouse gas emissions (GHG) by other means including, for example, the production of bioenergy to offset fossil fuel emissions. If enhanced phytolith production results in a reduced availability of biomass for other GHG mitigation strategies, its effectiveness for lowering net GHG emissions may be reduced or negated.

== See also ==
- Biomineralization
- Druse (botany) crystals of calcium oxalate, silicates, or carbonates present in plants
- Raphide elongate calcium oxalate crystals in plants

== Bibliography ==
- Thorn, V. C. 2004. An annotated bibliography of phytolith analysis and atlas of selected New Zealand subantarctic and subalphine phytoliths.
- Fabrice Colin; Jean Dominique Meunier (2001). Phytoliths. Washington, DC: Taylor & Francis. ISBN 978-90-5809-345-5.
- Kealhofer, L. 1998. Opal phytoliths in Southeast Asian flora.
- Jr, George V. Roberts; Susan C. Mulholland; Rapp, George Robert (1992). Phytolith systematics: emerging issues. New York: Plenum Press. ISBN 978-0-306-44208-7.
- Ciochon, RL; Piperno, DR; Thompson, RG (1990). "Opal phytoliths found on the teeth of the extinct ape Gigantopithecus blacki: implications for paleodietary studies". Proceedings of the National Academy of Sciences of the United States of America. 87 (20): 8120–8124. Bibcode:1990PNAS...87.8120C. doi:10.1073/pnas.87.20.8120. PMC 54904. PMID 2236026.
- Piperno, Dolores R. (1988). Phytolith analysis: an archaeological and geological perspective. Boston: Academic Press. ISBN 978-0-12-557175-3.
- Twiss, P. C.; Suess, E.; Smith, R. M. (1969). "Morphological classification of grass phytoliths" (PDF). Soil Science Society of America Journal. 33 (1): 109–115. Bibcode:1969SSASJ..33..109T. doi:10.2136/sssaj1969.03615995003300010030x. Archived from the original (PDF) on 2010-06-24.
- Pearsall, Deborah M. (2004). Plants and people in ancient Ecuador: the ethnobotany of the Jama River Valley. Belmont, CA: Wadsworth/Thompson Learning. ISBN 978-0-534-61321-1.
- Pearsall, Deborah M. (2000). Paleoethnobotany: a handbook of procedures (2nd ed.). Boston: Academic Press. ISBN 978-0-12-548042-0.
- Pearsall, Deborah M.; Piperno, Dolores R. (1998). The origins of agriculture in the lowland neotropics. Boston: Academic Press. ISBN 978-0-12-557180-7.
- Pearsall, D (2004). "Maize in ancient Ecuador: results of residue analysis of stone tools from the Real Alto site". Journal of Archaeological Science. 31 (4): 423–442. Bibcode:2004JArSc..31..423P. doi:10.1016/j.jas.2003.09.010.
- Darwin, C. (1846). "An account of the Fine Dust which often falls on Vessels in the Atlantic Ocean". Quarterly Journal of the Geological Society. 2 (1–2): 26–30. Bibcode:1846QJGS....2...26D. doi:10.1144/GSL.JGS.1846.002.01-02.09. S2CID 131416813.
