= Chalone =

Chalone may refer to:

- Chalone, an effector of tissue stress
- Chalone, California, US, former name of Metz, California
- Chalone Peak, in thec Pinnacles National Park, California, US
- Chalone AVA, American Viticultural Area in Monterey County, California
