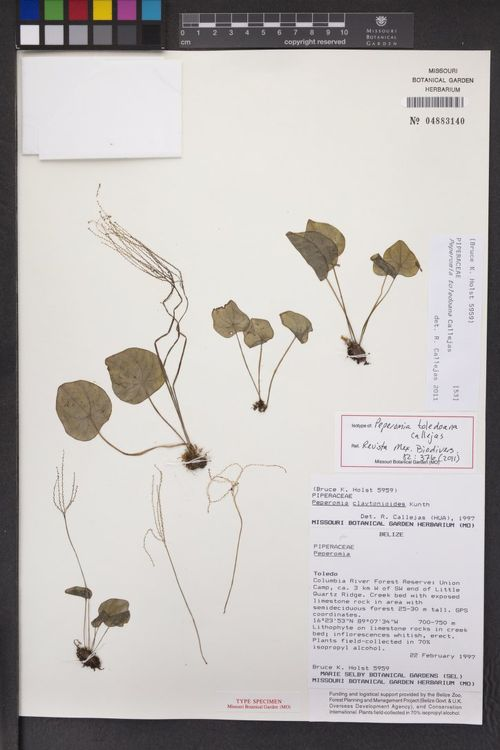

Scientific classification
- Kingdom: Plantae
- Clade: Tracheophytes
- Clade: Angiosperms
- Clade: Magnoliids
- Order: Piperales
- Family: Piperaceae
- Genus: Peperomia
- Species: P. toledoana

Binomial name
- Peperomia toledoana Callejas

= Peperomia toledoana =

Species of flowering plant

Peperomia toledoana is a species of perennial or lithophyte in the genus Peperomia endemic in Belize. It primarily grows on wet tropical biomes. Its conservation status is Threatened.

== Description ==
The first specimens where collected in Belize.

Peperomia toledoana is a delicate lithophytic herb that is entirely hairless. The tuber ellipsoid is 5 mm long and 3 mm wide that roots at the apex without foliar scars. There are 4-7 leaves per plant. The petioles are 2.5-3.8 cm long and slightly stripped with parallel lines. The blade of the leaf is widely ovate, 2–5 mm from the margin. 1.2-2.4 cm long, and 1.5-1.8 wide. The tip is rounded and obtuse. The base is slightly cordate, 5-6 palmatinerved. The innermost nerves diverge at an angle of 45°. The outmost nerves diverge at an angle of 80°. The tertiary nervation are abaxially evident, forming prominent areoles. These loops connected towards the margin form a marginal nerve that extens at least 2/3 of the lead. It is dense but minutely pellucid-dotted. The idioblasts are dark browning to blackish in dry leaves, they are abundant and visible in both faces. It is green and membranous when living and dry. The inflorescences have a common axis 5.5–12 cm baring 2-6 spadices. It has 1 terminal, the others are slight lateral, sub-erect, white when living and dry, each individual spadix from the axil of a small deltoid bract are 0,8 mm in diameter. The spadices are slightly spaced by short internodes, 0.3-0.7 mm long. The peduncle of each individual spadix is 2–4 mm long. The rachis are 2–5 cm long and 0,3 tall, threadlike, white in dry material. The flowers are densely congested on rachis at anthesis, widely spaced in fruit (0.7-1.2 mm). The bracts are widely obovate. The bracts have a 0.6-1.1 mm diameter base and decurrent along the rachis. The stamens have filaments that are 0.4 mm long. The anthers are 0.3 mm long. The ovary is oblong, 0.7 x 0.01 mm, sessile. The stigma is at the tip. The fruit is spherical, 0.4 mm in diameter, sessile and basally attached to the rachis.

It looks similar to P. claytoniodes. However, this species is a more fragile plant, with much thinner inflorescences. The leaves are 1.2-2.4 x 1.5-1.8 cm and the fruiting rachis are 2-2.4 x 0.3 mm whereas in P. claytoniodes leaves are 3.5-8.7 x 7-4 and the fruiting rachis are 5-8 x 0.5 cm. The leaves in this species are black pellucid-dotted, whereas this is lacking in P. clayoniodes.

== Taxonomy and Naming ==
It was described in 2011 by Callejas in Revista Mexicana de Biodiversidad, from specimens collected by Holst. It got its name from the location where the specimens were first collected, which was Toledo, Belize.

== Distribution and Habitat ==
It is endemic in Belize. It grows on a perennial or lithophyte environment and is a herb. It grows in wet tropical biomes.

== Conservation ==
This species is assessed as Threatened, in a preliminary report.
