= Cartonema parviflorum =

Wiridjagu

Scientific classification
- Kingdom: Plantae
- Clade: Tracheophytes
- Clade: Angiosperms
- Clade: Monocots
- Clade: Commelinids
- Order: Commelinales
- Family: Commelinaceae
- Genus: Cartonema
- Species: C. parviflorum

Binomial name
- Cartonema parviflorum Hassk.

Synonyms
- Cartonema spicatum F.Muell.

Species of flowering plant

Cartonema parviflorum, commonly known in wiridjagu, is a herb in the Commelinaceae family. It is native to northern Australia (Western Australia, Northern Territory, and Queensland) and New Guinea.

The perennial erect herb typically grows to a height of 0.2 to 0.6 metres (0.7 to 2.0 ft). It blooms between March and June producing yellow flowers.

It is found along watercourses, damp areas and in seasonally inundated areas in the Kimberley region in Western Australia where it grows in sandy-gravelly soils.
