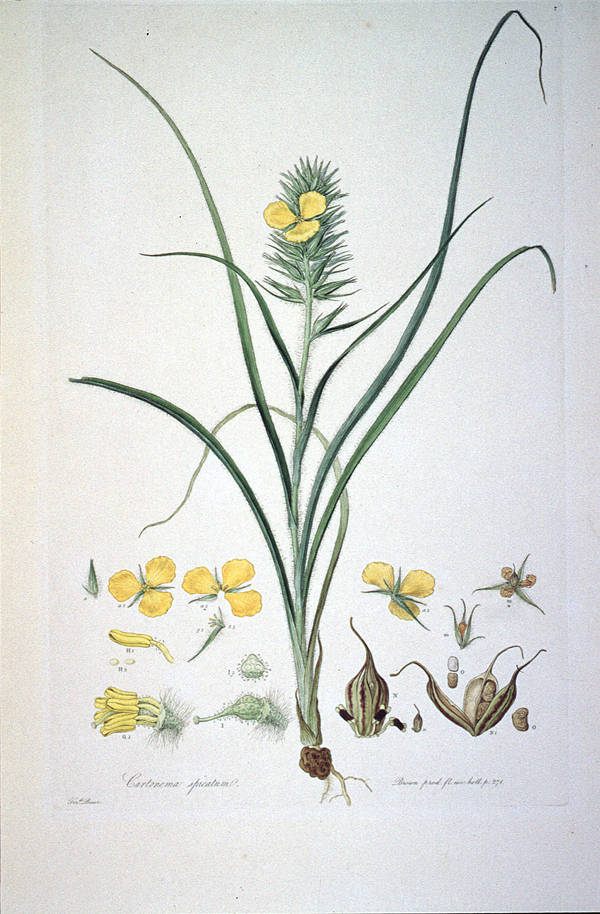

Scientific classification
- Kingdom: Plantae
- Clade: Tracheophytes
- Clade: Angiosperms
- Clade: Monocots
- Clade: Commelinids
- Order: Commelinales
- Family: Commelinaceae
- Genus: Cartonema
- Species: C. spicatum

Binomial name
- Cartonema spicatum R.Br.

= Cartonema spicatum =

Species of flowering plant

Cartonema spicatum is a herb in the Commelinaceae family.

The perennial herb typically grows to a height of 0.1 to 0.35 metres (0.3 to 1.1 ft). It blooms between January and July producing yellow flowers.

It is found in the Kimberley region in Western Australia where it grows in a variety of soils over basalt or sandstone.
