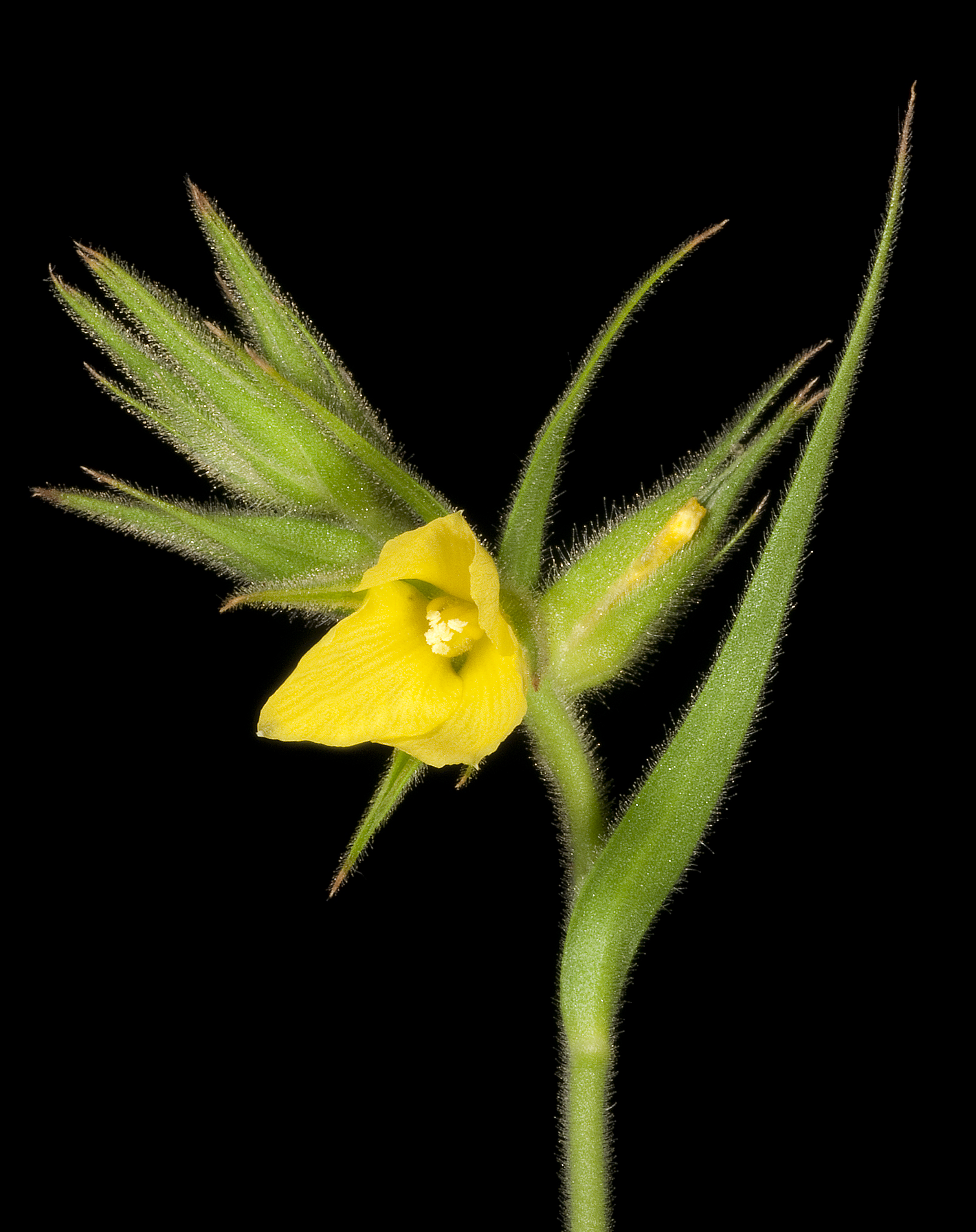

Scientific classification
- Kingdom: Plantae
- Clade: Tracheophytes
- Clade: Angiosperms
- Clade: Monocots
- Clade: Commelinids
- Order: Commelinales
- Family: Commelinaceae
- Genus: Cartonema
- Species: C. philydroides

Binomial name
- Cartonema philydroides F.Muell.

= Cartonema philydroides =

Species of flowering plant

Cartonema philydroides is a herb in the Commelinaceae family.

The perennial caespitose herb typically grows to a height of 0.1 to 0.5 metres (0.3 to 1.6 ft). It blooms between October and December producing yellow flowers.

It is found among sand dunes and in winter-wet areas along the west coast in the Mid West, Wheatbelt, Peel and South West regions of Western Australia where it grows in sandy soils.
