= Generative tissue =

Type of material used in medicine

Generative Tissue (gTissue) is a living tissue created in a patient (human or non-human) by a surgeon, consisting of an extracellular matrix, cells, and supporting vascular supply with generative properties. The 'g' in gTissue is considered a reference to both generated nature of the living tissue, but also to the generative ability of the tissue to be adapted to the dynamic environmental conditions experienced in the host.

== Overview ==
gTissue is a type of living Tissue (biology), hence an ensemble of cells and extracellular matrix that carry out a particular function. However, gTissue is created surgically, grown in a patient, and has a unique cellular and biochemical make-up that make it distinct from other tissues of the body. gTissue was discovered through research in the fields of Tissue Engineering and Regenerative Medicine and first created as a dense connective tissue between the brain and skull during the repair of canine dura mater. It has since been successfully created in humans for a wide range of clinical applications in soft tissue healing and repair. Essentially, the gTissue is created by implanting certain types of non-inflammatory ECM biomaterials that are adopted by the host, including repopulation with host cells and blood vessels, becoming a living tissue. To date, the types of gTissue created can be characterized as variants of soft connective tissues including dermis, tendon, ligament, and fascia.

== Generation of (Adoption) ==
Initially the cell-free ECM biomaterial is implanted and progressively adopted by the host. Immediately upon surgical implantation, the porous material becomes soaked in blood. This seeds the material with a population of circulating stem cells, and growth factors to support gTissue development. As generation progresses, the growth factors, cytokines, and fibrin provisional matrix signals host cells to repopulate the matrix. To support the metabolic activity of these cells, a vascular network is simultaneously created within the ECM biomaterial. At this stage the material has been adopted and has the characteristics of a living tissue (biology). Under some conditions, following adoption with host cells and vasculature, gTissue can persist indefinitely without any histological evidence of significant change. For example, when created to below the skin of the face in cosmetic procedures intended to add bulk, the gTissue is adopted and stays a living, metabolically active tissue, subdermally.

== Adaptation of ==
While gTissue can live indefinitely following adoption without significant change, there are environmental conditions that support the adaption of the tissue. The adaptation of gTissue is one reason it considered a generative tissue. Adaptation includes any change to the gTissue to meet particular environmental demands placed on it, based on the location of implantation. For example, during tendon augmentation procedures, the collagen fiber architecture of the extracellular matrix can transition to an aligned structure similar to native tendon, oriented along the long axis of loading, to meet the mechanical loading requirements. Or when used as an underlay beneath the muscles of the abdominal wall to support the repair of a hernia, gTissue is adapted forming a new mesothelium lining the peritoneal side in order to prevent adhesions to, or abrasion of, the bowel or small intestines.

== Requirements ==
In order to create gTissue, a surgeon must start by selecting and ECM biomaterial with appropriate characteristics to support the type of healing and repair desired. The ECM biomaterial must be non-inflammatory. Biomaterials that evoke a strong inflammatory response are rapidly remodeled into scar tissue. The ECM biomaterial must also not cause a chronic, low grade inflammatory response, or the material will be steadily degraded and therefore disappear with time. Examples of ECM biomaterials that meet these requirements and have been successfully used to create gTissue include SurgiMend, TissueMend, and Durepair. Additionally, the surgeon must be aware of how the anatomical location and surgical procedure affect host adoption and adaptation in order to grow the desired gTissue. For example, if the gTissue is to persist without change to add bulk, the implanted ECM biomaterial must be placed under low tension.
