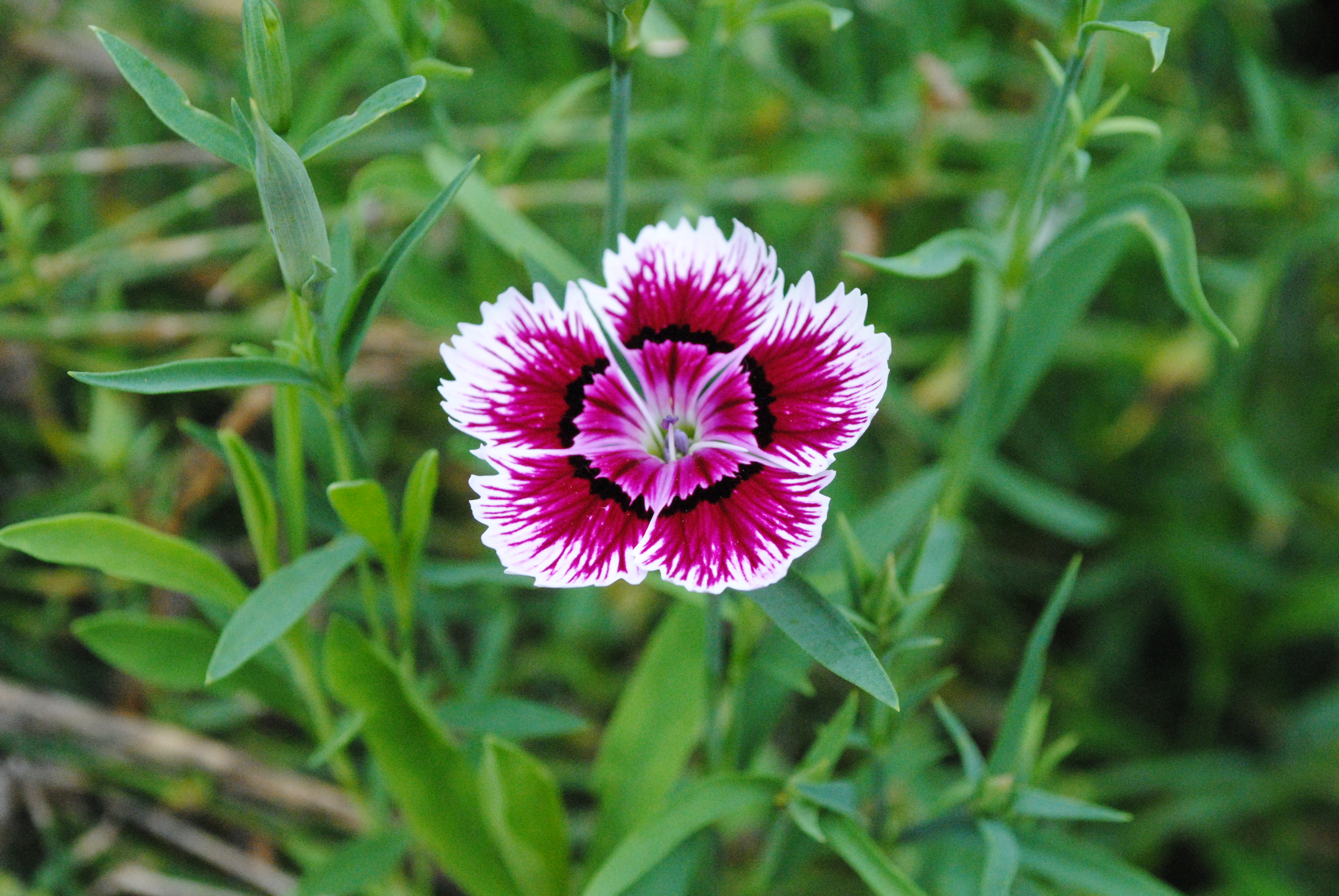
- A naturalized pink in Korea

Scientific classification
- Kingdom: Plantae
- Clade: Tracheophytes
- Clade: Angiosperms
- Clade: Eudicots
- Order: Caryophyllales
- Family: Caryophyllaceae
- Genus: Dianthus
- Species: D. chinensis

Binomial name
- Dianthus chinensis L.

= Dianthus chinensis =

Species of flower, "rainbow pink"

Dianthus chinensis, commonly known as rainbow pink or China pink, is a species of Dianthus native to northern China, Korea, Mongolia, and southeastern Russia. It is a herbaceous perennial plant growing to 30–50 cm tall.

== Description ==
The leaves are green to greyish green, slender, 3–5 cm long and 2–4 mm broad. The flowers are white, pink, or red, 3–4 cm diameter, produced singly or in small clusters from spring to mid summer. Several branched stems form a loose eyrie. The basal leaves are usually already withered during flowering, the leaves remain on the stem.

Growing in the form of a bush, the flowers are often together in pairs, and ornamental varieties could accommodate up to 15 flowers in a cymose inflorescence. Below the flower stand four bracts, which reach to half of the calyx; they are ciliated and point upward. The calyx forms a cylindrical, 1.5 to 2.5 cm long tube, the corolla reaches 3 to 4 cm in diameter and is serrated at the edge. The color of the petals ranges from white to pink to dark red, the middle is often pigmented darker. The capsule fruit is enclosed by the sepals. The black seeds are flattened-roundish.

== Distribution ==
The plant has a large distribution area in East Asia, which includes not only China, but also Korea and eastern Russia, to the northwest it still occurs in Mongolia and Kazakhstan. The Flora of China also counts Europe as the area of distribution. The sites include grasslands as well as sparse forests.

== Cultivation ==
It is widely cultivated as an ornamental plant, both in China and elsewhere across temperate regions of the world; numerous cultivars have been selected for garden use. Over the years, many forms have been derived from selection and hybridization. Today, the efforts of breeders are aimed at creating hybrids characterized by a compact bush, early and long flowering, flowers of various shades. This makes it possible to grow plants not only at the amateur level, but also for commercial purposes.

== Gallery ==
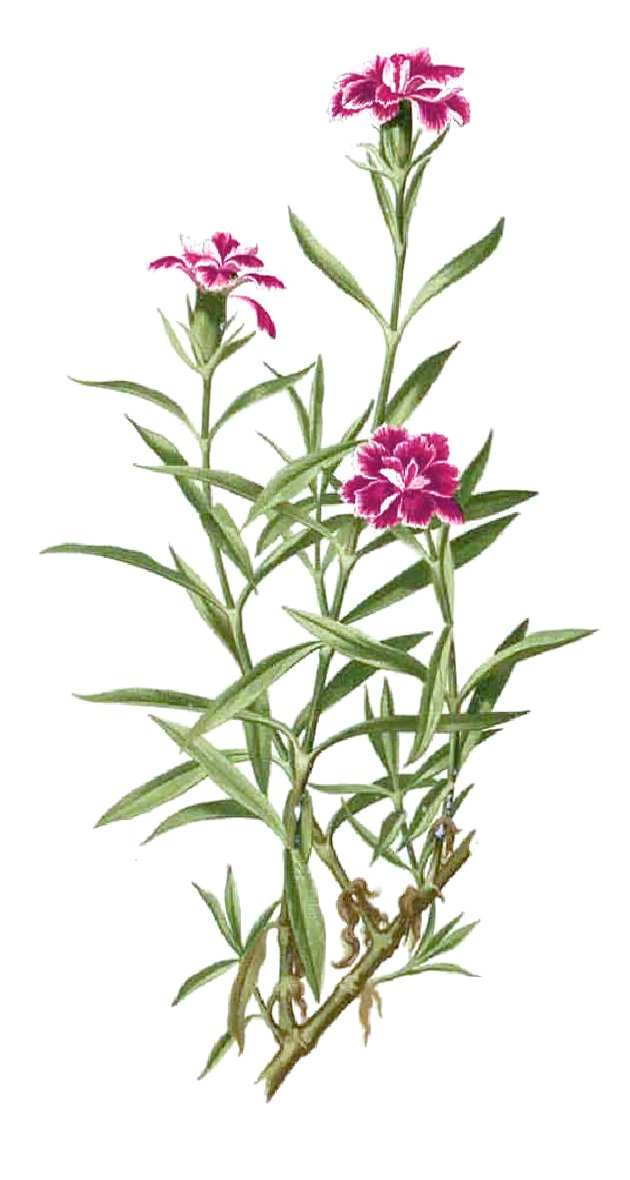
Botanical illustration

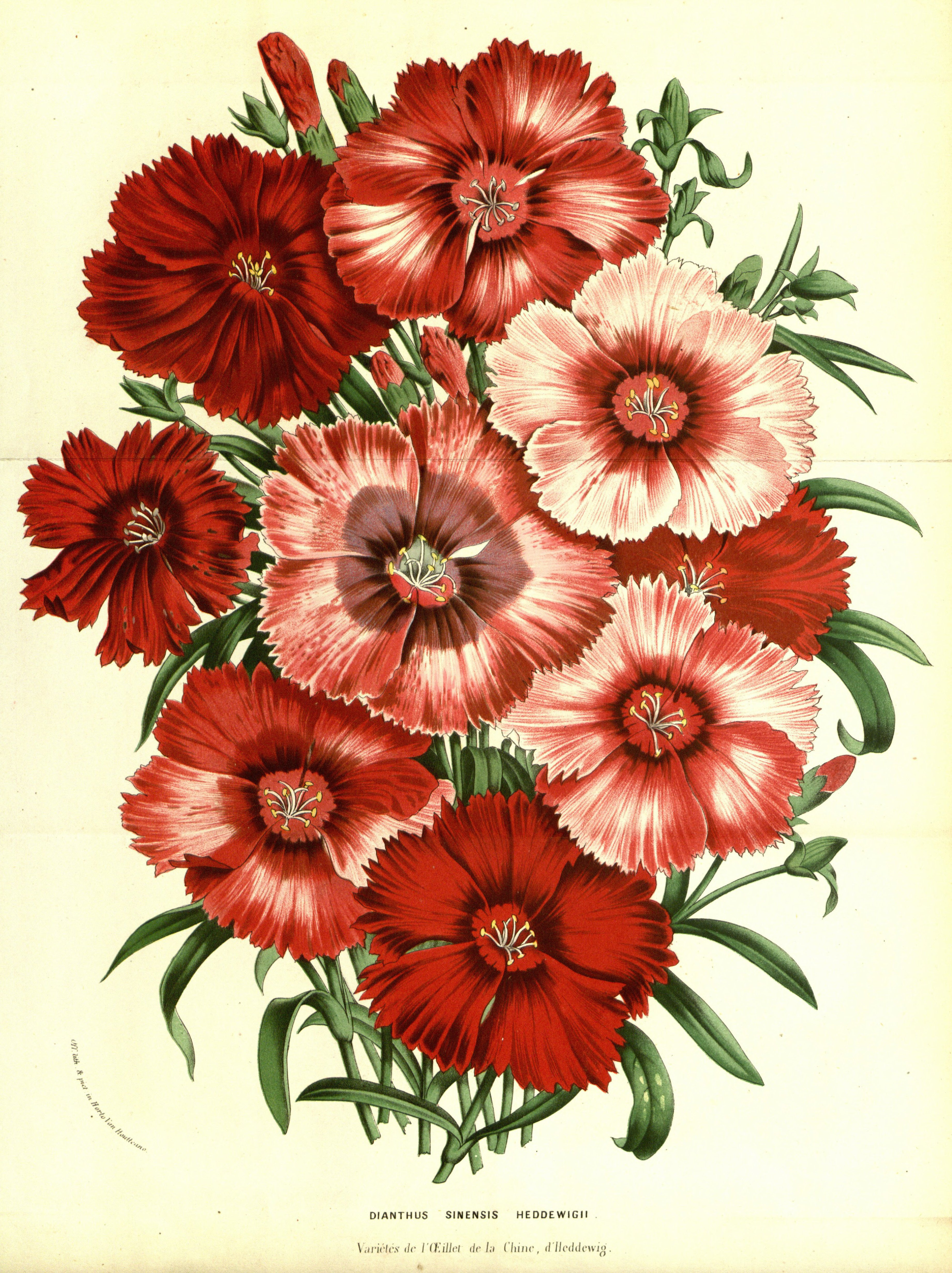
1858 illustration

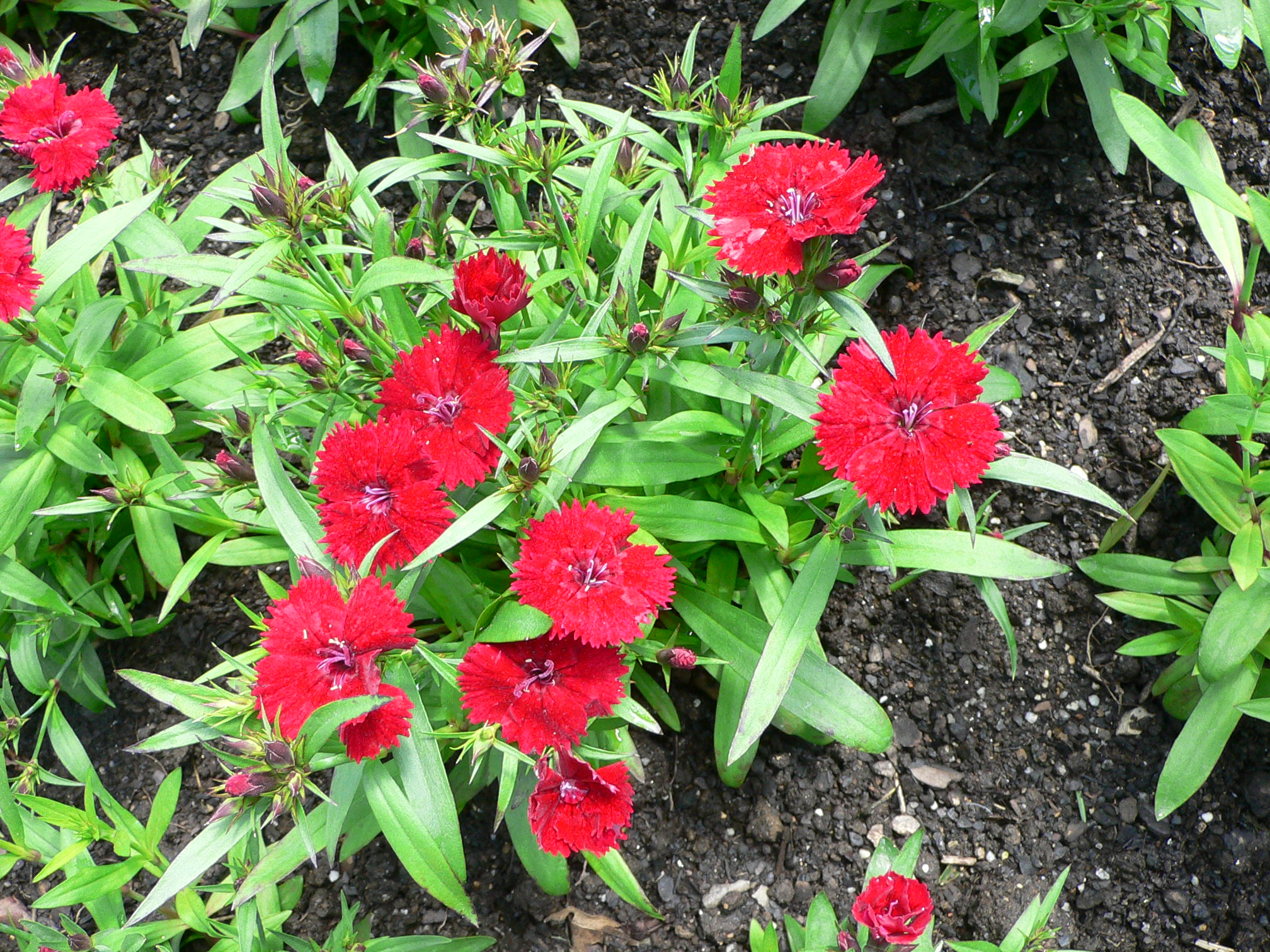
Red flowers

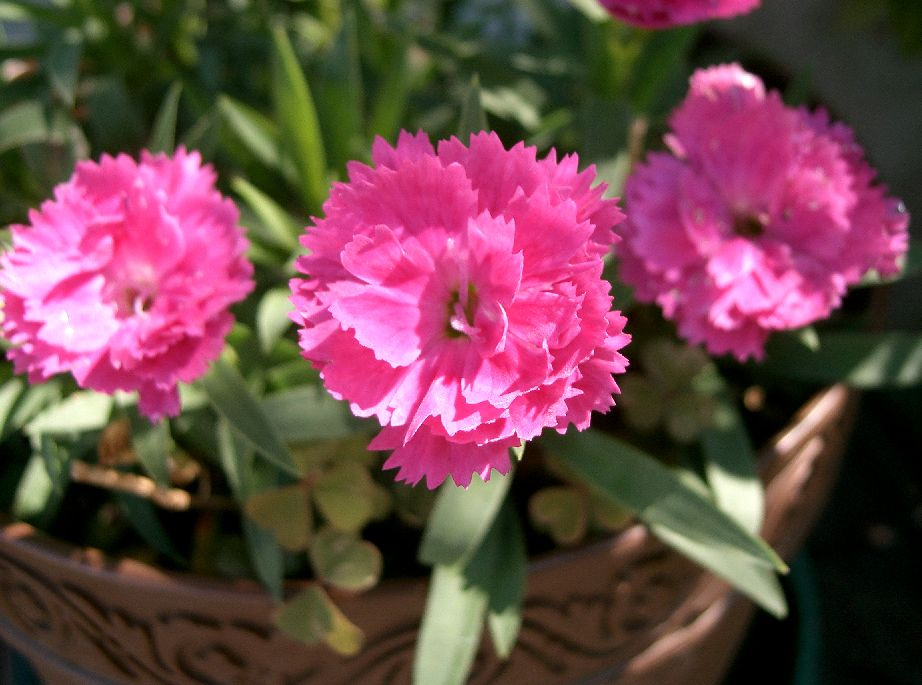
Dianthus chinensis var. senperflorens

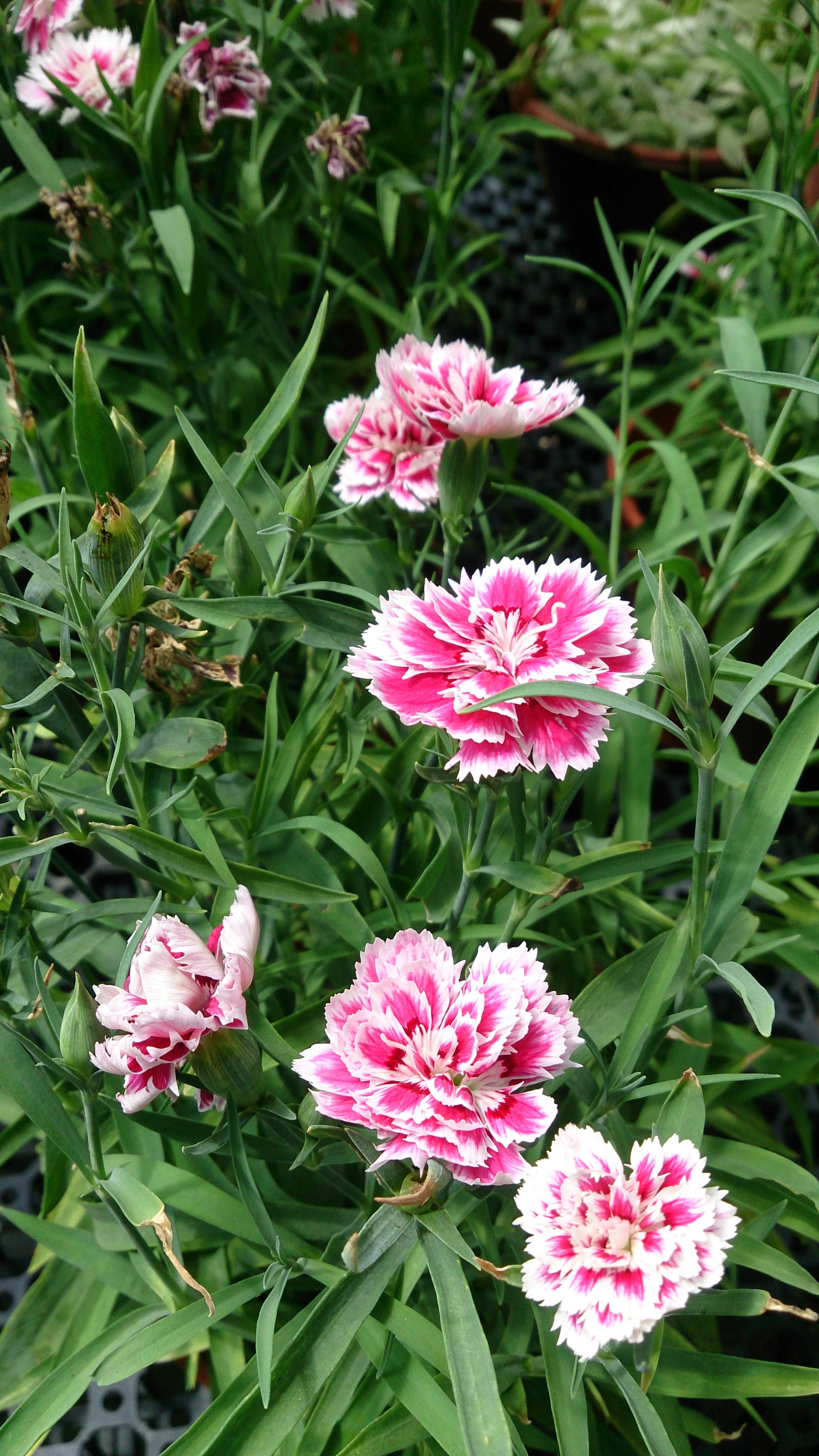
Pinkish white flowers

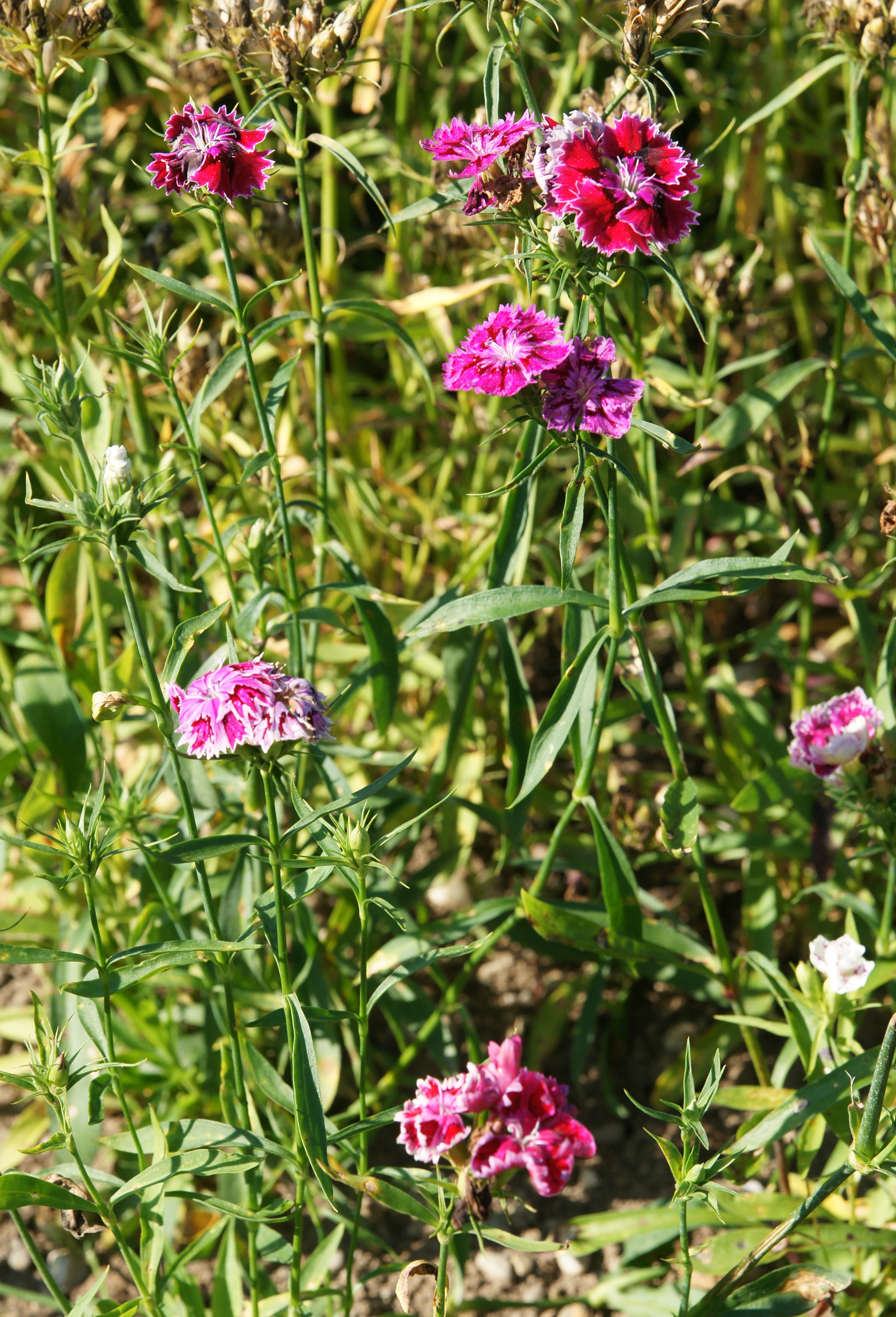
Imperials in a bush setting

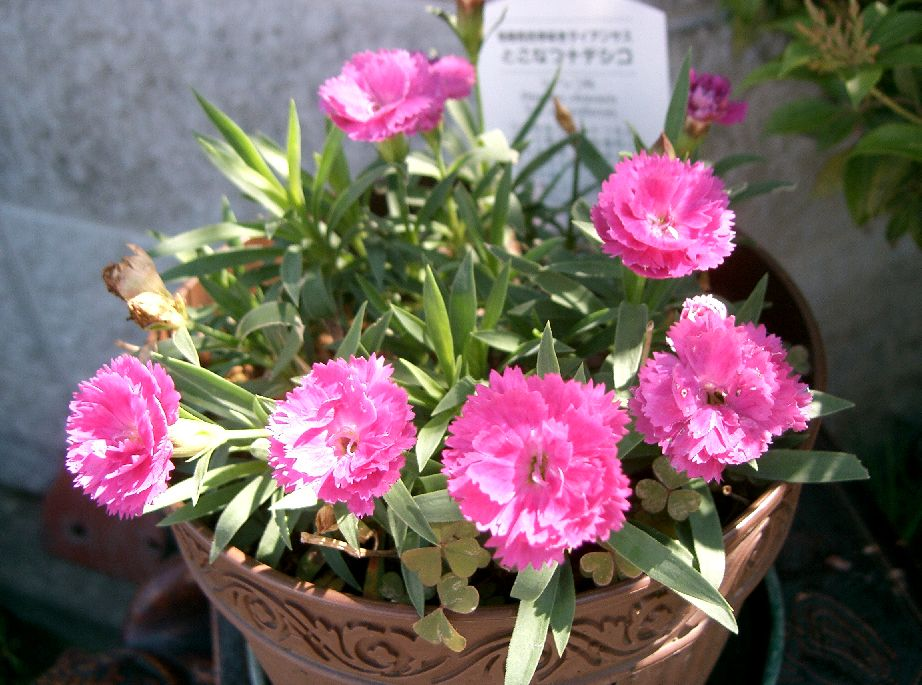
Dianthus chinensis var. senperflorens

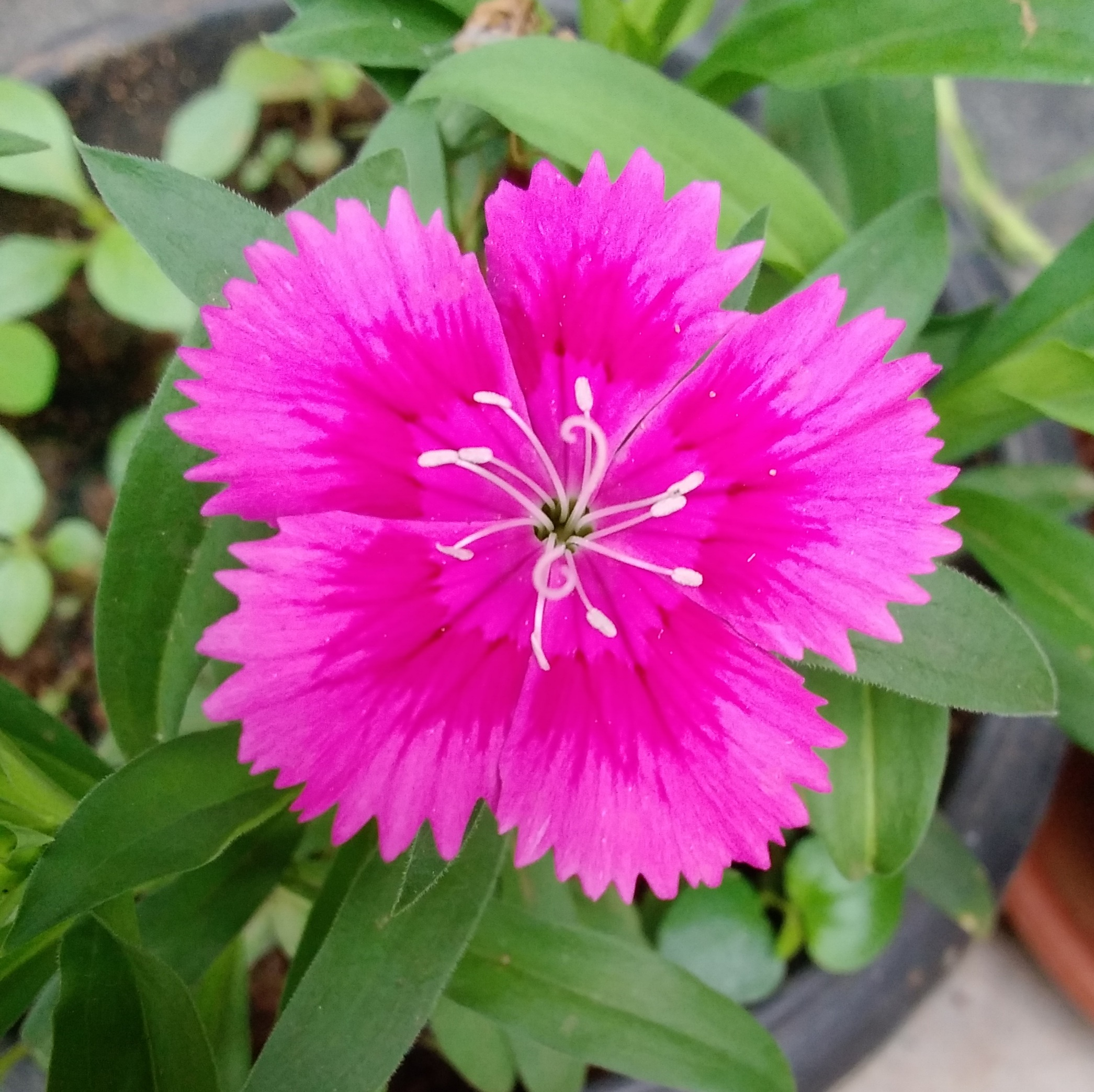
dark pink colored Dianthus chinensis

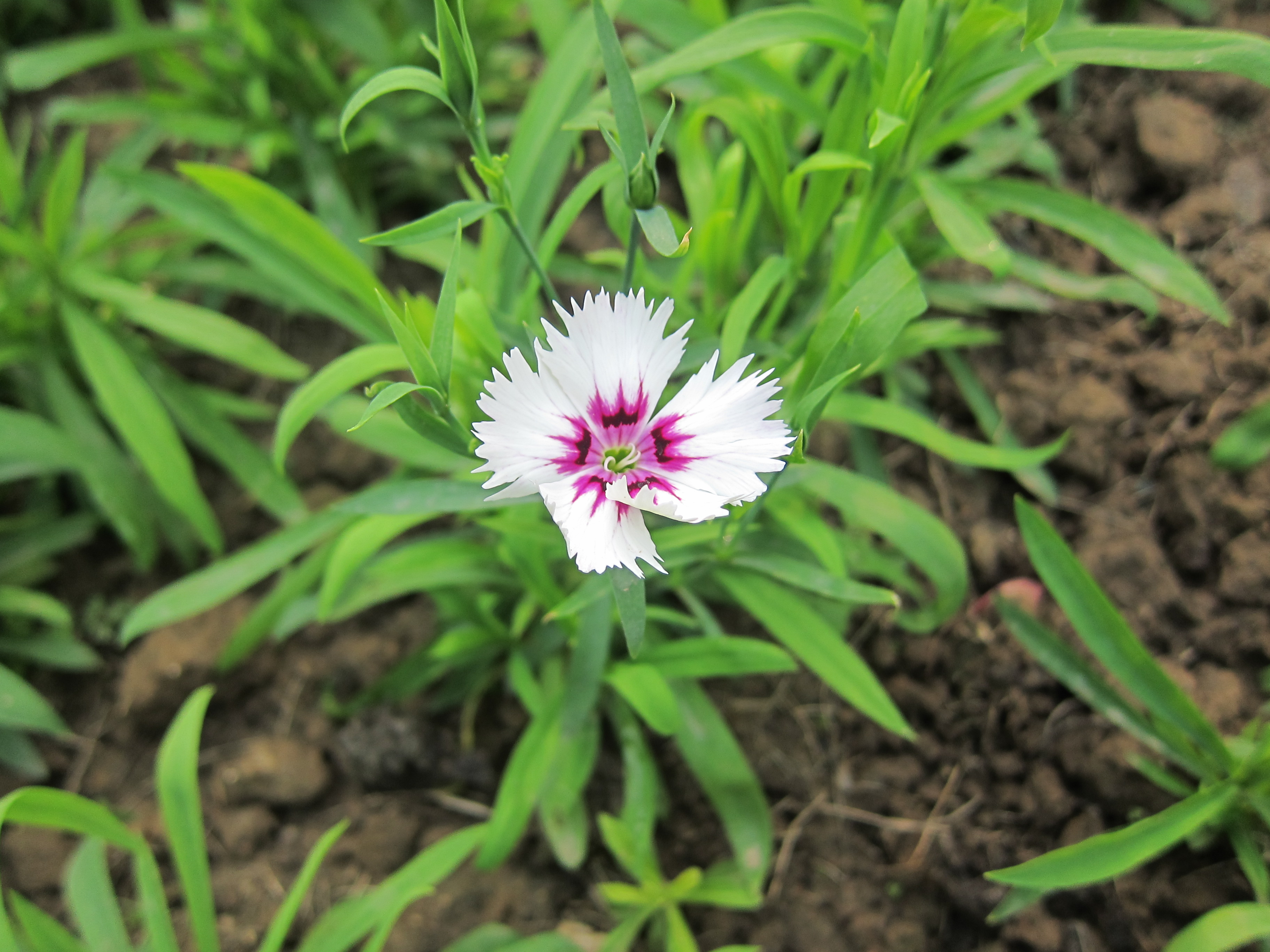
Guangxi Medicinal Botanical Garden in Nanning
