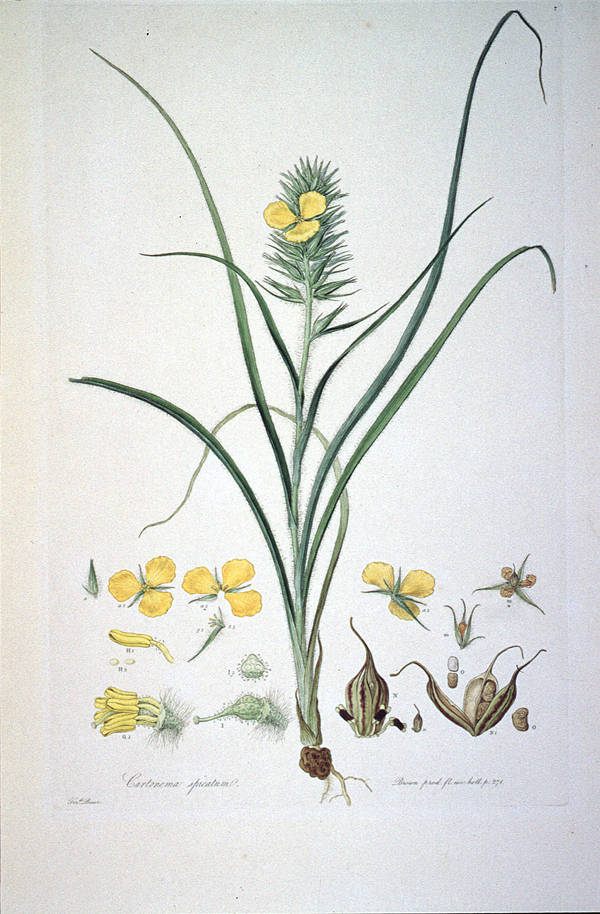
- Illustration of Cartonema spicatum from Ferdinand Bauer's 1808 work "Illustrationes Florae Novae Hollandiae"

Scientific classification
- Kingdom: Plantae
- Clade: Tracheophytes
- Clade: Angiosperms
- Clade: Monocots
- Clade: Commelinids
- Order: Commelinales
- Family: Commelinaceae
- Subfamily: Cartonematoideae
- Tribe: Cartonemateae
- Genus: Cartonema; R.Br.

Type species
- Cartonema spicatum R.Br.

Species
- Cartonema baileyi F.M.Bailey; Cartonema brachyantherum Benth.; Cartonema parviflorum Hassk.; Cartonema philydroides F.Muell.; Cartonema spicatum R.Br.; Cartonema tenue Caruel; Cartonema trigonospermum C.B.Clarke

= Cartonema =

Genus of flowering plants

Cartonema is a genus of perennial or annual monocotyledonous flowering plants in the dayflower family. It is restricted to Australia and nearby Trangan Island, one of Indonesia's Aru Islands. It is the earliest diverging member of its family and has a number of traits that are unique within it, such as non-succulent leaves and a lack of raphides (a particular form of calcium oxalate). Its distinctive features led to the genus to once be considered part of its own separate family, Cartonemataceae. However, analysis of DNA sequences, as well as many common anatomical characters, has supported its relationship with the Commelinaceae. It contains seven species.

== Description ==
Plants in the genus may be either annuals or perennials, and in the latter case they sometimes have tubers. The leaves are spirally arranged, lack a leaf stalk, and are covered in glandular hairs; the leaf blade is linear. Flowers are borne on an inflorescence that either occurs along the main shoot or at its terminus, in the form of either a spike or a raceme. As with all members of the family Commelinaceae, the ultimate inflorescence unit is a cincinnus, also called scorpioid cymes, which are monochasiums (i.e. cymes with a single branched main false axis) in which the lateral branches arise alternately on opposite sides of the false axis. However, in Cartonema the cincinnus is highly reduced such that each only bears one flower. The flowers are bisexual, radially symmetrical, and lack a stalk. The sepals are not fused and bear glandular hairs, while the petals are yellow to pink (in rare cases) and are also unfused. They bear six fertile stamens which have no hairs on their filaments and release pollen from a slit that develops from top to bottom, known as longitudinal dehiscence. The ovary is composed of three carpels with two or more ovules in each. The fruit is a capsule opening with three valves. The seeds are arranged in a single row within the capsule and show a small point-like scar where previously attached to the carpel (i.e. the hilum is punctiform). The diploid chromosome number is 24.

Cartonema is distinct from the rest of the dayflower family in a number of important features. They lack internal raphides, calcium oxalate crystals in a needle-like shape, which all other members of the family have. They lack glandular microhairs, which are small trichomes thought to be involved in the lubrication of freshly expanding leaves, which again all of the plants' siblings have. Finally, they have yellow flowers and glandular hairs on the leaves and stems; these characters are not unheard of in the rest of the family, but both are very rare.

== Species ==
Seven species are accepted.

- Cartonema baileyi F.M.Bailey – northwestern Queensland
- Cartonema brachyantherum Benth. – northeastern Queensland
- Cartonema parviflorum Hassk. – New Guinea and northern Australia
- Cartonema philydroides F.Muell. – Southwest Australia
- Cartonema spicatum R.Br. – northern Australia
- Cartonema tenue Caruel – northern Northern Territory and northern Queensland
- Cartonema trigonospermum C.B.Clarke – northern Northern Territory
