= Druse (botany) =

Crystals found in plants

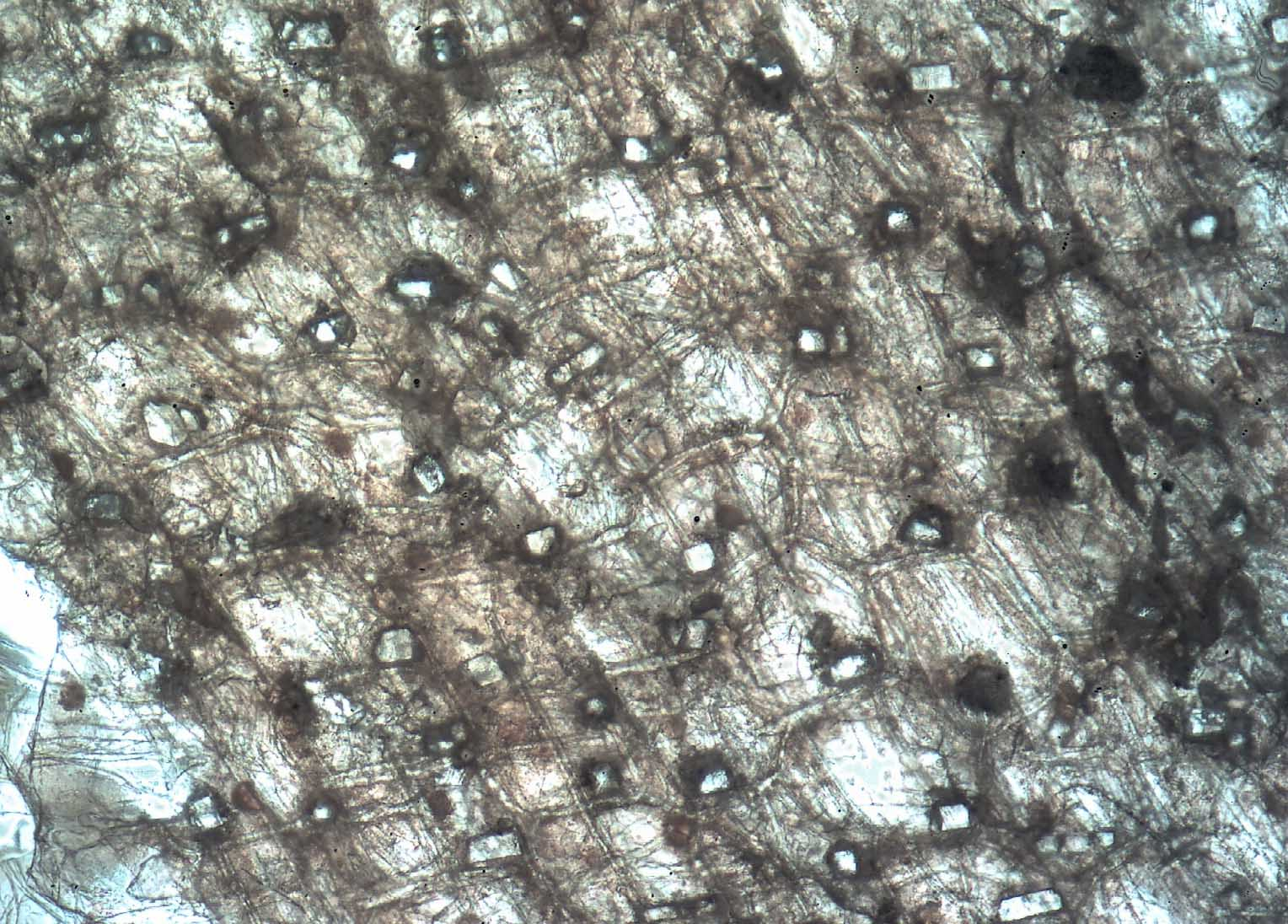
Druses in onion scales (100x magnification)

A druse is a group of crystals of calcium oxalate, silicates, or carbonates present in plants, and are thought to be a defense against herbivory due to their toxicity. Calcium oxalate (Ca(COO)_{2}, CaOx) crystals are found in algae, angiosperms and gymnosperms in more than 215 families. These plants accumulate oxalate in the range of 3–80% (w/w) of their dry weight through a biomineralization process in a variety of shapes. Araceae have numerous druses, multi-crystal druses and needle-shaped raphide crystals of CaOx present in the tissue. Druses are also found in leaves and bud scales of Prunus, Rosa, Allium, Vitis, Morus and Phaseolus.

== Formation ==
A number of biochemical pathways for calcium oxalate biomineralization in plants have been proposed. Among these is the cleavage of isocitrate, the hydrolysis of oxaloacetate, glycolate/glyoxylate oxidation, and/or oxidative cleavage of L-ascorbic acid. The cleavage of ascorbic acid appears to be the most studied pathway. The specific mechanism controlling this process is unclear. Still, it has been suggested that a number of factors influence crystal shapes and growth, such as proteins, polysaccharides, and lipids or macromolecular membrane structures. Druses may also have some purpose in calcium regulation.

== See also ==
- Idioblast
- Raphide
- Phytolith
- Plant defense against herbivory
