= Idioblast =

Type of plant cell

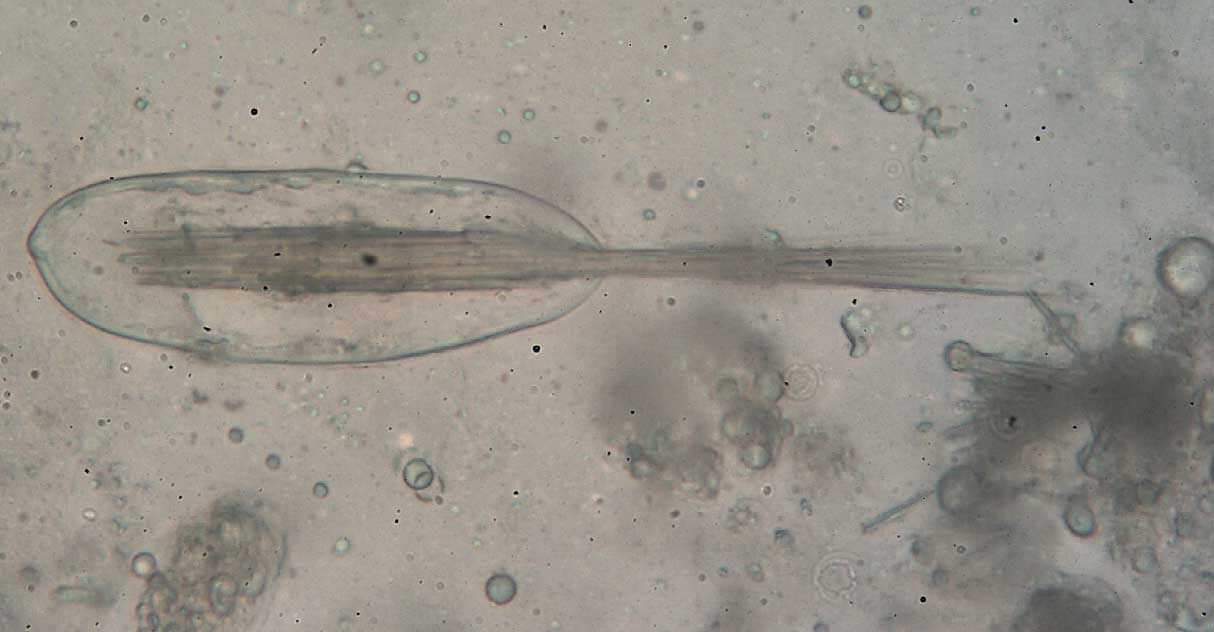
Calcium oxalate needles shot out from idioblast (600x magnification)

An idioblast is an isolated plant cell that differs from neighboring tissues. They have various functions such as storage of reserves, excretory materials, pigments, and minerals. They could contain oil, latex, gum, resin, tannin, or pigments etc. Some can contain mineral crystals such as acrid tasting and poisonous calcium oxalate, carbonate, or silica. Any of the tissue or tissue systems of plants can contain idioblasts. Idioblasts are divided into three main categories: excretory, tracheoid, and sclerenchymatous.

Idioblasts can contain biforine cells that form crystals. The chemicals are excreted by the plant and stored in liquid or crystalline form. In bundles they are known as druse and as crystals they can be of raphide [needle] form. When the end of an idioblast is broken the crystals or other substance is ejected by internal water pressure. Idioblasts of calcium oxalate may function as a deterrent to herbivores, as a means of sequestering or storing calcium, or as a means of stiffening tissue structure.

== Three types of idioblast ==
Excretory idioblasts store oils, lipids, tannins, mucilage, and minerals. They are currently under research for their storage of the important medicinal qualities of plants. Selective culturing of excretory idioblasts allows better harvesting of their stored products.

Tracheoid idioblasts strongly resemble tracheids, or water-conducting cells. Tracheoids are elongated idioblasts with helical or reticulate secondary walls. They are not connected to the plant's vascular system. Tracheoid idioblasts have also been known as lignified idioblasts, spiral cells, tracheoidal idioblasts, spirally thickened sclereids, and tracheoidioblasts.

Sclerenchymatous idioblasts are thickened structural cells that provide stability and rigidity to the plant. In multiples they are known as sclereids. A singular sclerenchymatous idioblast is less common than the grouped sclereids. Their development and differentiation is unknown.

== Crystals ==
There are a variety of crystal types and shapes that can be stored within an idioblast. Crystals form in plants when there is an excess of minerals available and play various roles in plant function. Druses are crystalline clusters that appear scale or box like and play structural roles in sclerenchymatous idioblasts. Styloids and raphides are both needle like crystal projections, with raphides being smaller. Both styloids and raphides can contain barbs and are important defense mechanisms. Prisms are multifaceted crystal formations that assist pollen function. Sand are fine, grainy crystals. The most common substance for crystal is calcium oxalate, a common product from calcium abundance in plants.

== Known roles of idioblasts in plants ==
Avocado isoblasts contain the lipid persin which is known for its antifungal capabilities. There is current research into the effects of persin in breast cancer treatment. Avocado isoblasts also contain oil, which is harvested and consumed as avocado oil.

Araceae produce calcium oxalate raphides for defense against herbivores. When damaged, sap from the plant and saliva from the animal will cause the idioblast to swell and hydraulically shoot the raphides out. Consumption of the raphides can cause oral pain, vomiting, hypersalivation, and swelling of the pharynx.

Rhododendron Vireya have small, thin leaves when compared to other subgenuses of Rhododendron, and inversely have much greater volumes of water storing idioblasts. The Vireya subgroup is believed to have developed specialized idioblasts to aid the water metrics within its small leaves to counter the lack of volume.

== Development ==
Idioblast cells are believed to be the precursors for guard cells, trichomes, gland cells, and subsidiary cells of stomata. The uneven division of idioblasts causes extreme differentiation in their daughter cells, with many daughter cells having different functions from their parent cell. How or why a singular idioblast forms among other cells is unknown.

== See also ==
- Plant defense against herbivory
- Phytolith
