= Tissue stress =

Tissue stress (tissue adaptive syndrome) is an unspecific adaptive reaction universal for all tissues of adult organism which forms in tissue as a response to various external influences. The latter are tissue cells’ damage, overload of their specialized functions or regulatory influences.

== Tissue stress mechanism ==
According to tissue adaptive syndrome (TAS) concept, this adaptive mechanism (see adaptation) comes into effect in damaged tissue (see Tissue (biology)) as a result of concurrence of two events. The first one is accumulation of TAS effectors in tissue (comutons, chalones, and contactins), which possess a unique feature of tissue specificity in their action on homologous tissue cells without species specificity. The second one is increase in sensitivity of damaged cells to these regulators, as it was demonstrated on the example of comuton. These effectors cause tissue-specific self-damage of homologous cells via disturbance of their ion homeostasis and energy-production processes. As a result, unspecific reaction to damage (CURD) is activated in the cells. This universal physiological reaction plays a role of TAS executive mechanism. Thus, the adaptive function of tissue stress is brought into action using such CURD properties as increase of cell unspecific resistance, as well as influence on the rate of cell metabolic processes. It is obvious that in the case of TAS these changes have to be tissue-specific, since they are initiated by way of cell self-damage under tissuespecific influence of TAS effectors.

As is well known the CURD consists of two phases. In the process of a slight damage of the cell, the phase of metabolism stimulation is forming in it. When the cell is slightly damaged, it begins to form the phase of metabolism stimulation. Strong damaging influences initiate the CURD phase of metabolism inhibition in the cell.

According to the TAS concept, the protective effect of the tissue stress is realized in the case of forming of CURD metabolism stimulation phase by TAS effectors as a result of acceleration of reparative processes in the damaged cell. In the process of forming of CURD phase of metabolism inhibition by the above effectors the protective influence of tissue stress develops a result of cell reactivity decrease in response to the external damaging influences.

== The place of the tissue stress in line of the unspecific adaptive reactions ==
The main feature of the tissue stress is its formation with participation of the tissuespecific effectors of intratissue intercellular interactions – comutons, chalones and contactins, which are produced by the cells of a tissue under a stressor's influence. This distinguishes the tissue stress from the general adaptive syndrome, which is realized via hormones – effectors of interorgan interactions (see Stress (biological)). Regional (local) stress forms with participation of not one but several tissues making up an organ or a body part. This is why it can be believed that regional stress-reaction is realized with the participation of effectors of intraorgan intertissue interactions. Finally, the cell stress is realized via intracellular mechanisms, without any participation of intercellular interactions. In the latter case the CURD formation and synthesis of heat shock proteins act as “self-defense” mechanism of the cell.

Another distinctive feature of tissue stress is the principle of formation of its executive mechanism, the CURD, via tissuespecific self-damage of homologous tissue cells. Despite the fact that TAS, just as the cell stress, is realized via CURD, the TAS has a variety of features which distinguish it from the cell stress, the key one being the tissue-selectivity of CURD initiation under TAS effectors influence. In addition, under cell stress the cell protection is realized with CURD participation only via “passive” mechanism. It consists in the formation of the protective phase of this physiological reaction. Meanwhile, under tissue stress, its protective function may be carried out both the “passive” and “active” CURD-induced mechanisms. Thus, the cell stress mechanism is just one of the two instruments with which TAS protects the cells of homologous tissue. The third difference between tissue and cell stresses lies in ability of the former not only to increase but also to decrease the unspecific resistance of the cells. Meanwhile, the cell stress concept considers only the first possibility.

At the present moment, two physiological functions of tissue stress, which are realized in the process of participation of its adaptive mechanism, can be considered. One of them is expressed in an increase of cell specialized functions stability in the conditions of prolonged functional load. Another tissue stress function is to regulate homologous tissue cell mass in various physiological conditions.

== Tissue stress function on homologous tissue cells specialized functions stability improvement ==
It is well known that only some part of tissue functional units participate in its cells specialized functions realization (Barcroft, 1937). Because of universality of this phenomenon it was named “the law of intermittent activity of functioning structures” (Kryshanovskii, 1973; Kryshanovskii, 1974). According to this law, functional units of actively functioning tissue (or cells) form two populations where one is in “intensive functioning” state and the other one – is in “resting” state. Thereat the “rest” is not a passive state since there active reparation of cellular structures occurs damaged in the course of specialized functions performing by cells. “Intermittent” pattern of tissue cells specialized functions realization is that the cells pass from one population to another when the tissue is in intensive functioning mode. In such a way the cells damaged in consequence of intensive functioning gain an offing to recover in “resting” population. Meanwhile, recovered cells pass from the “resting” population into “intensively functioning” one. It is safe to say that such organization of tissue functioning favors stability of its cells functions performance. Yet, the mechanisms which regulate cells passage from one population to another on intratissue level are unknown.

Considering the law of “intermittent activity of functioning structures” one can talk about two results of the TAS mechanism action on the cells of actively functioning tissue. In conditions where the TAS effector (effectors) forms CURD phase of metabolism stimulation one should expect an acceleration of reparative processes in the cells of “resting” population. Obviously that will promote accelerated recovery of such cells and their pass to intensively functioning cell population. In case if TAS mechanism forms the CURD phase of metabolism inhibition in intensively functioning cells population this will lead to cell signaling inhibition and promote cells “autonomy” from other external influences. Such autonomy may provoke an inhibition of cell's specialized functions in mentioned population in case if they are stimulated by external regulatory influences. An inhibition of cells specialized functions by the TAS mechanism may promote defense of intensively functioning cells from self-damage and also their pass into the “resting” state. Thus, the properties of tissue stress executive mechanism – CURD – allow it to raise tissue functions stability in conditions of continuous intensive activity in many ways.

== Tissue stress function on regulation of homologous tissue cell mass ==
According to the TAS concept, tissue stress possess the ability to regulate the cell mass of homologous tissue via executive mechanism described above – the CURD. As in the case of cells specialized functions regulation there are two ways of tissue-specific control of homologous tissue cell mass. These are cells unspecific resistance modulation and influencing the speed of physiological processes occurring in the cell.

Tissue stress mechanism able to control tissue cell mass influencing both its mitotic and apoptotic (see Apoptosis) activities tissue-specifically. In case if TAS effectors form CURD phase of metabolism stimulation one should expect acceleration of proliferative (see Proliferation) pool cells passage through mitotic cycle (MC). Herewith there will be also an acceleration of cells maturation and ageing. This will provoke an increase of both mitotic and apoptotic activity in tissue. On the contrary, formation of CURD phase of metabolism protective inhibition should result in opposite results – an inhibition of all mentioned processes and, as a result, to inhibition of both mitotic and apoptotic activities. One cannot exclude the possibility that tissue stress mechanism considered able to regulate apoptosis through inhibition of its energy-dependent stage. As concerns the modulation of cells unspecific resistance by tissue stress mechanism, this property of CURD allows to regulate cells entrance into MC as well as their entrance into apoptosis.

Regulation of tissue cell mass by the TAS mechanism can be carried out in two physiological regimes – ether by formation of “conservative” or “dynamic” phase of this adaptive reaction. TAS conservative phase is forming under the influence of “weak” unspecific external damaging or “load” influences on cells specialized functions. Here tissue stress provides intratissue adaptation by preservation of the existing cell population in the tissue. It is achieved by raise of cells unspecific resistance under the influence of tissue-specific self-damage of cells by TAS effectors. This prevents entrance of postmitotic cells both into MC and apoptosis. The TAS dynamic phase forms under “strong” external unspecific damaging or “loading” influences on cells specialized functions. According to TAS concept in dynamic phase of tissue stress a summation of damaging influence of stressor (stressors) with cells self-damage by TAS effectors occurs. This leads to stimulation of proliferation (see Proliferation) and to an increase of apoptotic activity (see Apoptosis) simultaneously. Thus, in above case adaptive function of tissue stress realizes by replacement of damaged, dying cells by descendants of cells more resistant to stressor(s) influence.

As is clear from the foregoing, according to the TAS concept tissue stress mechanism effect on homologous tissue cells is multifarious. It may protect them against the unspecific damaging influences as well as to increase stability of tissue specialized functions in the conditions of prolonged intensive functional activity. Simultaneously, the same mechanism performs intratissue control of cell mass of homologous tissue.

== See also ==
- Cellular stress response
