= Tylosis (botany) =

Process in tree decay

In woody plants, a tylosis (plural: tyloses) is a bladder-like distension of a parenchyma cell into the lumen of adjacent vessels. The term tylosis summarises the physiological process and the resulting occlusion in the xylem of woody plants as response to injury or as protection from decay in heartwood. It is a key process in wall one of the compartmentalization of decay in trees (CODIT) and other woody plants.

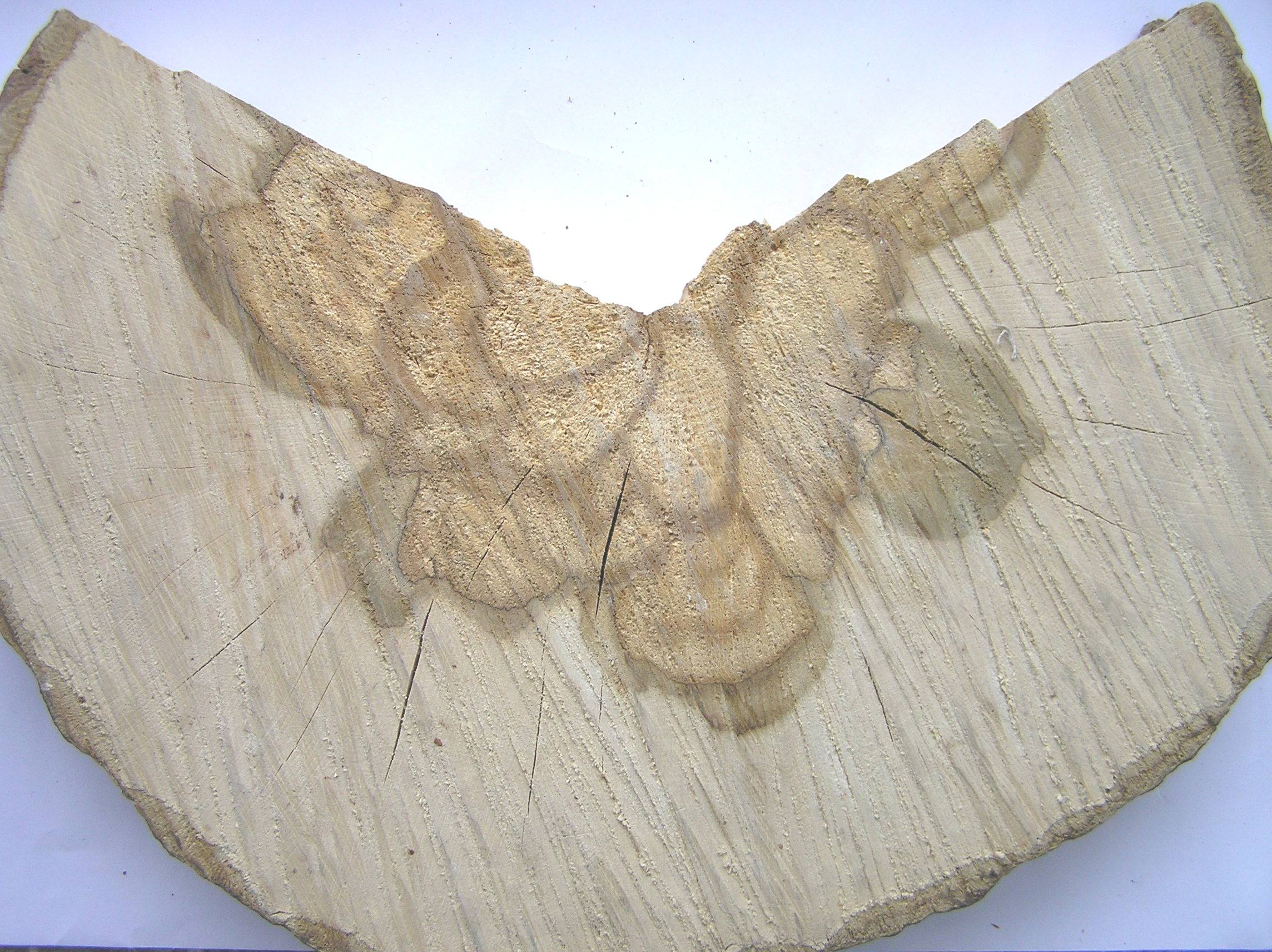
Section of Carpinus betulus wood showing the distinctive dark areas created as a result of tylosis in response to fungal infection

== Anatomy ==
Observed in section under a microscope, tyloses appear as balloon-like protrusions emanating from axial paratracheal parenchyma cells into xylem vessels through pits linking the two. In some types, there may be a distinct barrier between the tyloses emanating from the pits into the vessels, while they may be barely distinguishable in other cases.

== Tyloses ==
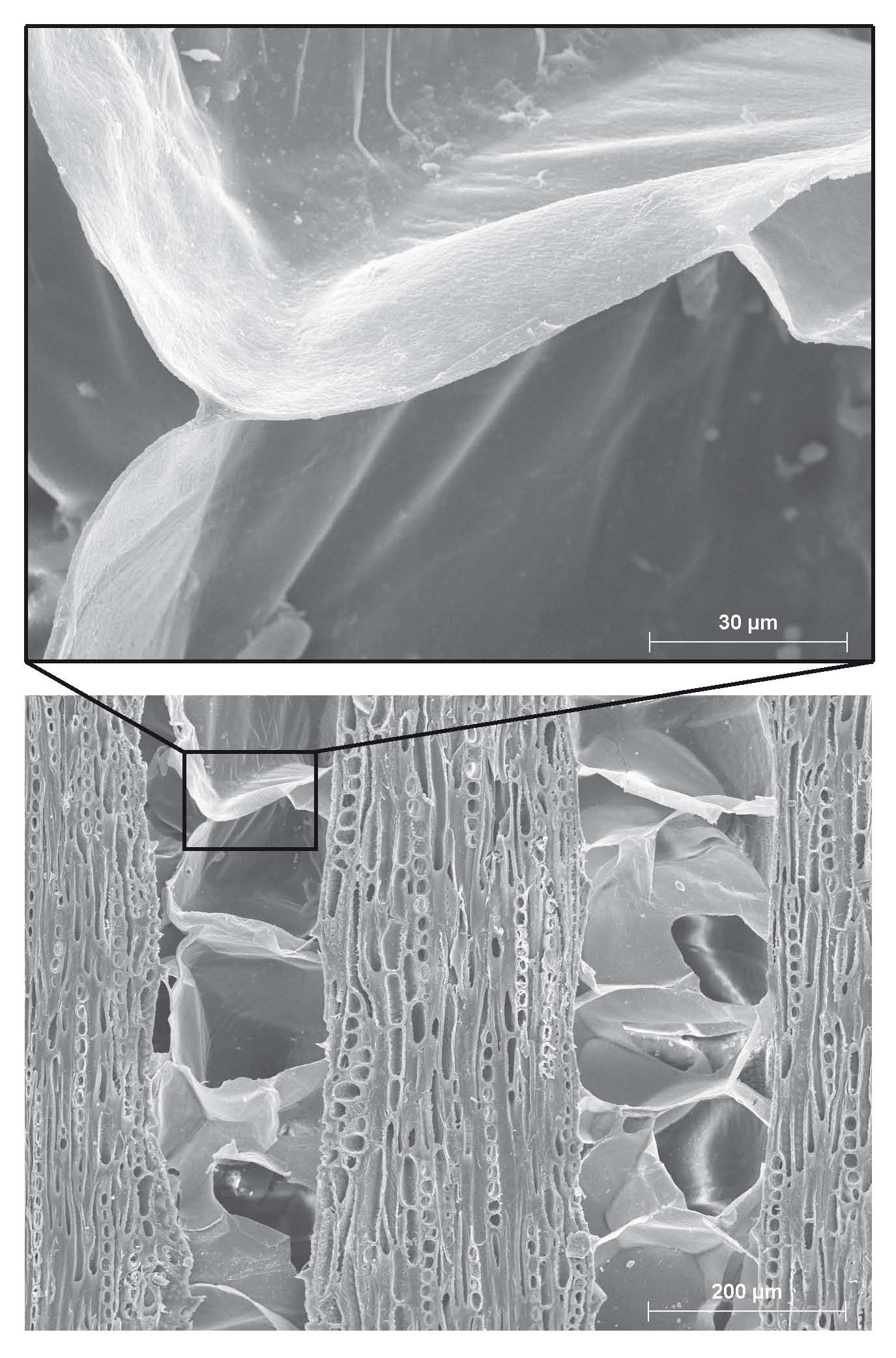
Vessels of Quercus petraea with tyloses

Tyloses are outgrowths on parenchyma cells of xylem vessels of secondary heartwood. When the plant is stressed by drought or infection, tyloses will grow from the sides of the cells and "dam" up the vascular tissue to prevent further damage to the plant.

Tyloses can aid in the process of making sapwood into heartwood in some hardwood trees, especially in trees with larger vessels. These blockages can be used in addition to gum plugs as soon as vessels become filled with air bubbles, and they help to form a stronger heartwood by slowing the progress of rot.

== Role in compartmentalization ==
Tylosis in the vessels of flowering plants counteracts the axial spread of fungal hyphae and other pathogens by slowing down their vertical spread with a physical barrier. A similar process occurs in gymnosperms, which blocks access to tracheids by closing the pits that join them to each other.

The blocked vessels also provide a defense against the radial spread of pathogens, limiting their horizontal spread through the plant stem. Protection is stronger at the boundaries where annual rings meet.

The effectiveness of both vertical and horizontal barriers is affected by the speed at which they are established by tyloses, being typically faster in healthier plants.

== Role in heartwood formation ==
As a tree grows, its cambium adds an annual increment (or ring) of new wood, and in many species of trees the older wood towards the centre of the tree becomes less important for physiological processes like water and nutrient transportation, and this is converted by the tree to heartwood. This heartwood has no active defenses against infection, but is protected from infection and decay by the blockage of the xylem vessels with tyloses and various substances such as gums, resins and waxes containing high concentrations of volatile organic compounds such as terpenes that are toxic to insect larvae and tree pathogens such as bacteria and fungi. These products are produced by the cambium and transported to the centre of the stem by cellular structures called medullary rays radiating from the center of the stem and then enter living axial paratracheal parenchyma cells. As the wood ages, the contents of the parenchyma cell burst into the dead vessel through the pit linking the two. The parenchyma cell then dies as its contents are disgorged into the empty space of the dry vessel and highly effective decay-inhibiting substances, notably tannin, are formed and absorbed by the adjacent vessel walls.
