= Resin canal =

Elongated, tube-shaped intercellular spaces surrounded

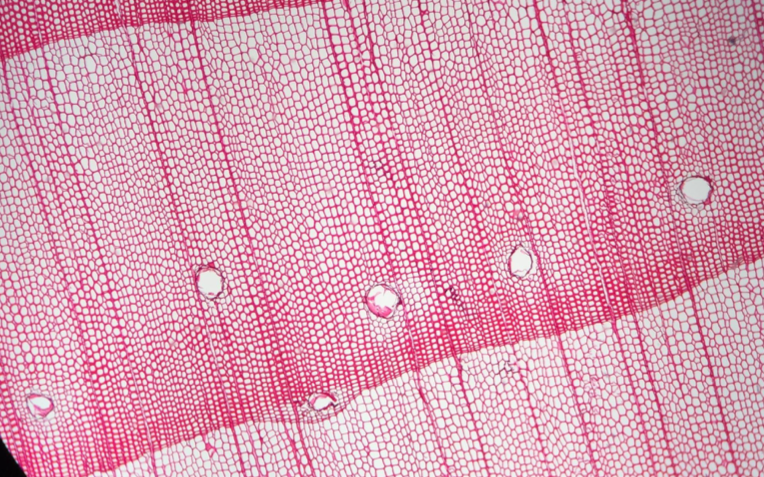
Resin canals seen as white dots in pine wood viewed under a microscope

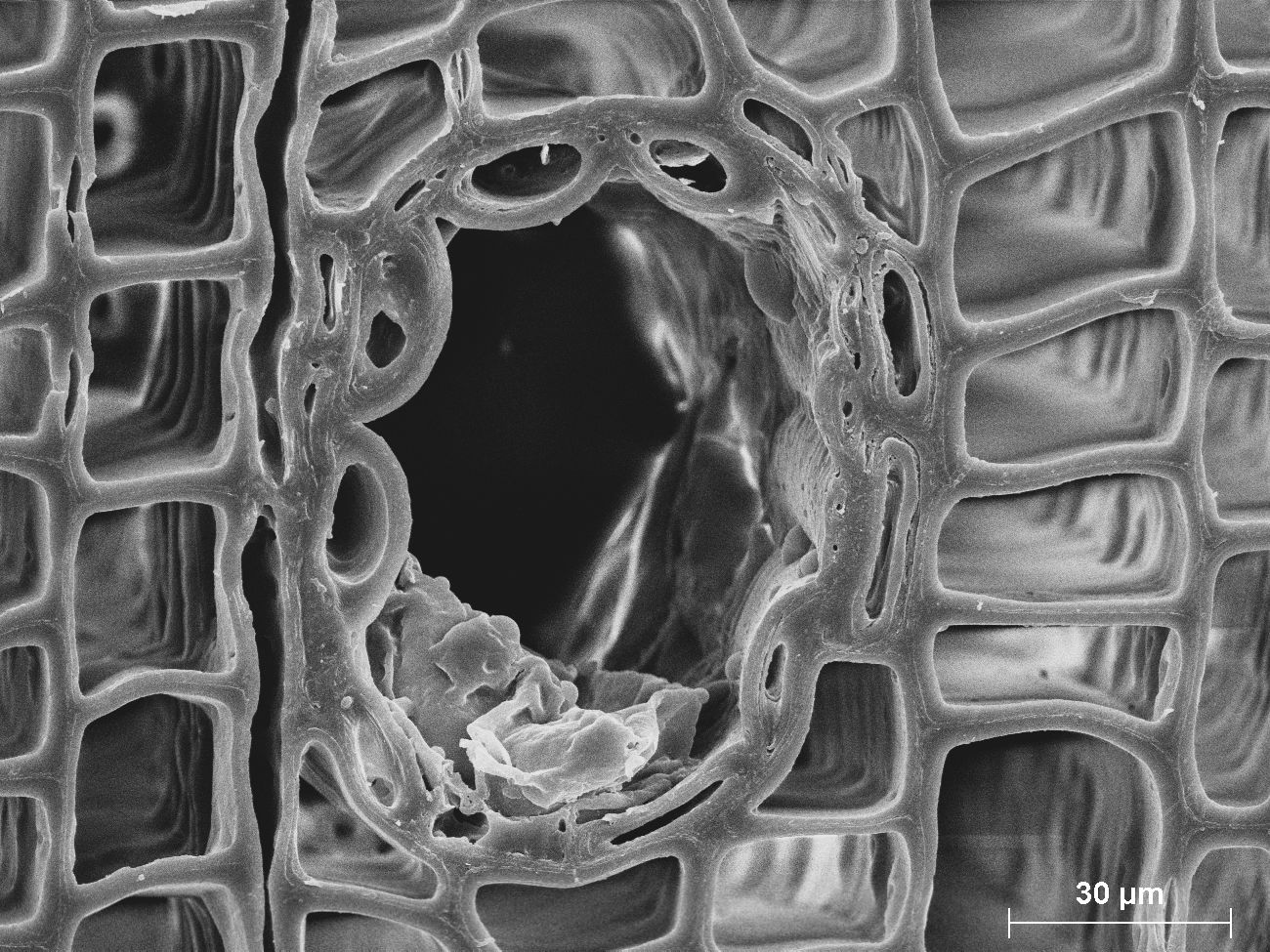
Axial resin canal (Picea abies)

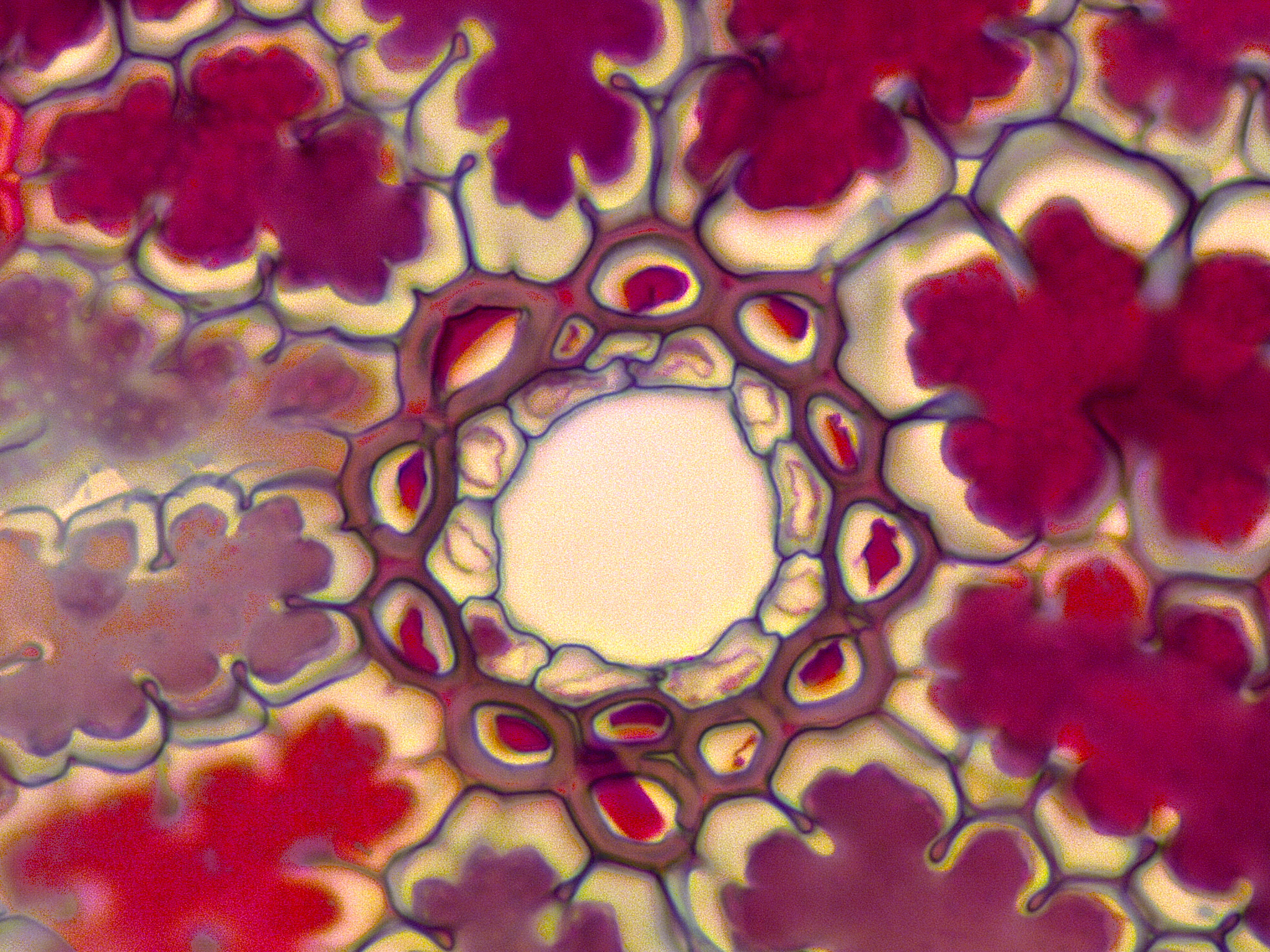
Pinus; leaf (3 needle type) Resin Canal

Resin canals or resin ducts are fusiform intercellular spaces surrounded by epithelial cells which secrete resin. Canals are lined with 6–8 thin-walled cells and surrounded by layers of parenchyma cells. This tissue spreads out to the sides like wings and merges with the canal.

A three dimensional lattice of canals runs both axially through the wood and radially within medullary rays. Axial canals (also called longitudinal canals) are usually found in late wood, or denser wood grown later in the season.

Resin is both antiseptic and aromatic and prevents the development of fungi and deters insects.

== Types ==
- Normal resin canals exist naturally in the wood of the genera Picea, Larix, Pinus and Pseudotsuga in the Softwoods, and also Shorea in the Hardwoods.
- Traumatic resin canals, often irregular in shape, may be formed in wounded trees. Wounding occurs by fire, pathogens or mechanical damage.

== Characteristics ==
Resin canal characteristics (such as number, size and density) in pine species can determine its resistance to pests. In one study, biologists were able to categorize 84% of lodgepole pine, and 92% of limber pines, as being either susceptible or resistant to bark beetles based only on their resin canals and growth rate over 20 years. In another study, scientists found ponderosa pine trees that survived drought and bark beetle attacks had resin ducts that were >10% larger in diameter, >25% denser (resin canals per mm^{2}), and composed >50% more area of per ring.
