= Secondary cell wall =

The secondary cell wall is a structure found in many plant cells, located between the primary cell wall and the plasma membrane. The cell starts producing the secondary cell wall after the primary cell wall is complete and the cell has stopped expanding. It is most prevalent in the Ground tissue found in vascular plants, with collenchyma having little to no lignin, and sclerenchyma having lignified secondary cell walls.

== Structure and function ==
Secondary cell walls provide additional protection to cells and rigidity and strength to the larger plant. These walls are constructed of layered sheaths of cellulose microfibrils, wherein the fibers are in parallel within each layer. The inclusion of lignin makes the secondary cell wall less flexible and less permeable to water than the primary cell wall. In addition to making the walls more resistant to degradation, the hydrophobic nature of lignin within these tissues is essential for containing water within the vascular tissues that carry it throughout the plant.

The secondary cell wall consists primarily of cellulose, along with other polysaccharides, lignin, and glycoprotein. It sometimes consists of three distinct layers - S_{1}, S_{2} and S_{3} - where the direction of the cellulose microfibrils differs between the layers. The direction of the microfibrils is called microfibril angle (MFA). In the secondary cell wall of fibres of trees a low microfibril angle is found in the S2-layer, while S1 and S3-layers show a higher MFA . However, the MFA can also change depending on the loads on the tissue. It has been shown that in reaction wood the MFA in S2-layer can vary. Tension wood has a low MFA, meaning that the microfibril is oriented parallel to the axis of the fibre. In compression wood the MFA is high and reaches up to 45°. These variations influence the mechanical properties of the cell wall.

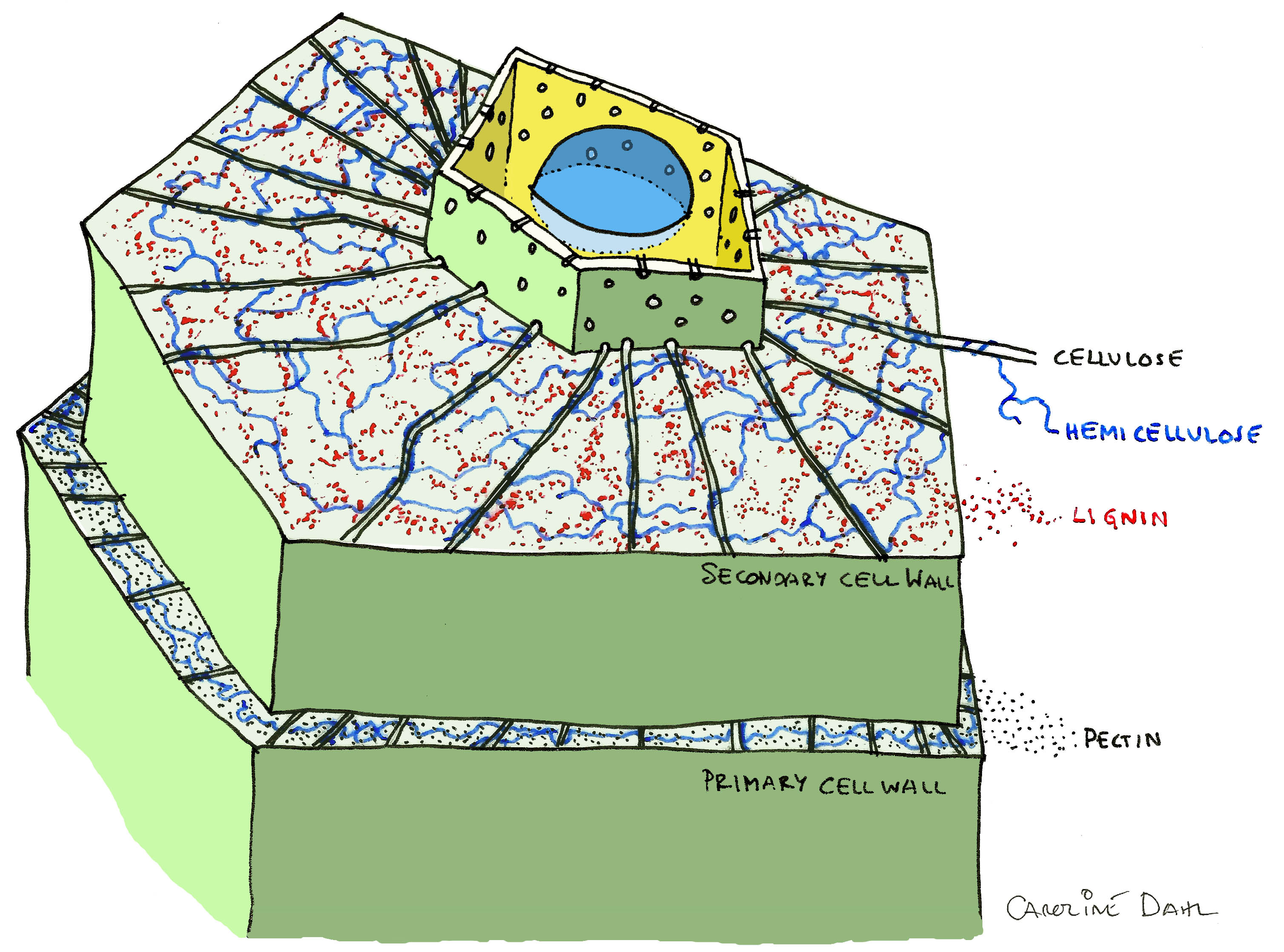
Plant cell overview, showing secondary cell wall.

The secondary cell wall has different ratios of constituents compared to the primary wall. An example of this is that secondary wall in wood contains polysaccharides called xylan, whereas the primary wall contains the polysaccharide xyloglucan. The cellulose fraction in secondary walls is also higher. Pectins may also be absent from the secondary wall, and unlike primary walls, no structural proteins or enzymes have been identified. Because of the low permeability through the secondary cell wall, cellular transport is carried out through openings in the wall called pits.

Wood consists mostly of secondary cell wall, and holds the plant up against gravity.

Some secondary cell walls store nutrients, such as those in the cotyledons and the endosperm. These contain little cellulose, and mostly other polysaccharides.

== Evolution ==
The first lignified secondary walls evolved 430 million years ago, creating the structure necessary for vascular plants. The genes used to form the constituents of secondary cell walls have also been found in Physcomitrella patens. This suggests that a duplication of these genes was the driver of secondary cell wall formation.

== Pathogen resistance ==
The secondary cell wall plays an active role in pathogen resistance. It has been shown to accumulate anti-microbial peptides that prevent bacteria and fungi from entering the cell. Lignin has also been shown to prevent the infection of cells. Plant cells will increase the production of lignin generating enzymes when stressed by some pathogens, further lignifying the secondary cell wall. Increased lignin content is particularly effective at resisting vascular pathogens that use the secondary xylem to spread.
