= Sclereid =

Plant tissue type

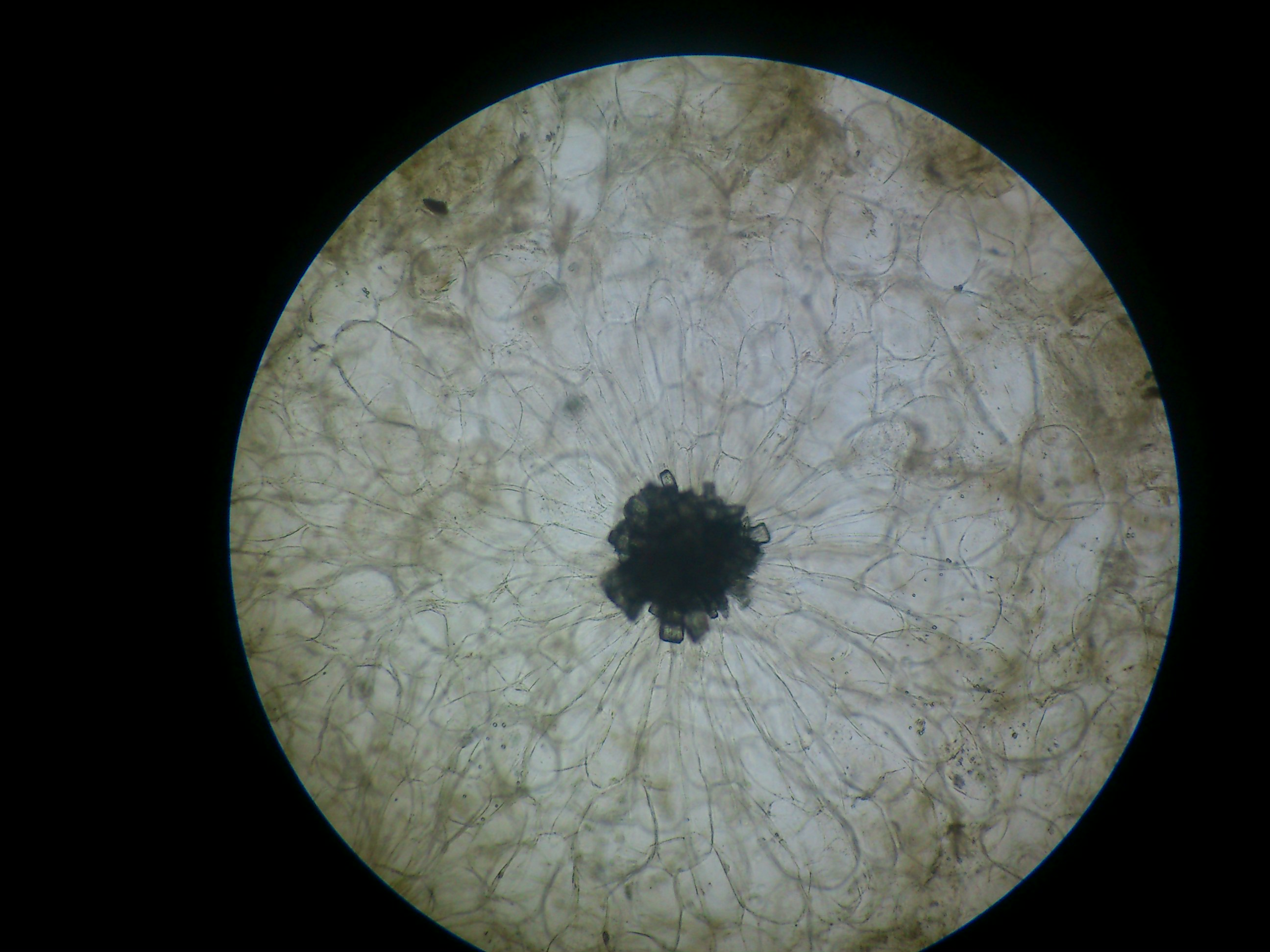
Fresh mount of a sclereid in a banana fruit

Sclereids are a reduced form of sclerenchyma cells with highly thickened, lignified cellular walls that form small bundles of durable layers of tissue in most plants. The presence of numerous sclereids form the cores of apples and produce the gritty texture of guavas.

Although sclereids are variable in shape, the cells are generally isodiametric, prosenchymatic, forked, or elaborately branched. They can be grouped into bundles, can form complete tubes located at the periphery, or can occur as single cells or small groups of cells within parenchyma tissues. An isolated sclereid cell is known as an idioblast. Sclereids are typically found in the epidermis, ground tissue, and vascular tissue.

The term "sclereid" was introduced by Alexander Tschirch in 1885.

== Origin ==
Sclereids are created through belated sclerosis of parenchyma cells or can arise from sclereid primordia that are individualized early in development. Sclerification typically involves thickening of the cell wall, increasing rigidity. In the phloem, when tissue ceases to function in conduction cells may begin sclerification. In vascular tissue, sclereids will develop from cambial and procambial cells.

== Stem sclereids ==
In the vascular region of the stem of Hoya carnosa, a column of sclereids can be found, and in the pith of stems of Hoya and Podocarpus groups of sclereids can be found. These are sclereids with thick cell walls and numerous pits, resembling adjacent parenchyma cells. This resemblance suggests that these sclereids are originally parenchyma cells, but are so sclerified that they are now sclereid cells rather than parenchyma cells. These sclereids are an example of brachysclereids, or stone cells.

== Leaf sclereids ==
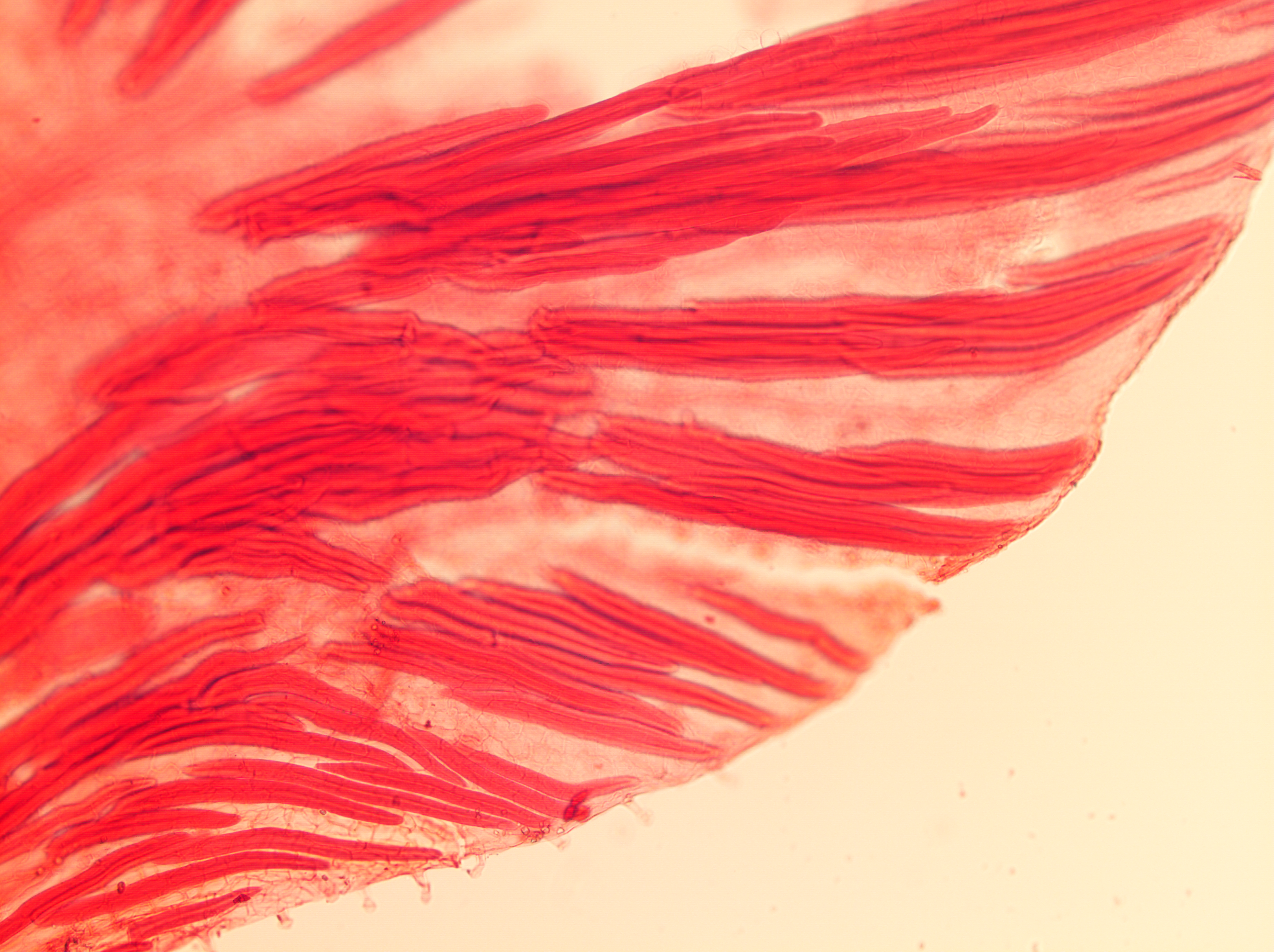
Long tapered sclereids supporting a leaf edge in Dionysia kossinskyi

Leaves contain a variety of types of sclereids. In the mesophyll, two distinct sclereid structures are found. Sclereids in a diffuse pattern are dispersed throughout the leaf tissue, and sclereids in a terminal pattern are concentrated about the tips of leaf veins. Sclereid formations in leaves include the branched sclereids of Trochodendron, the columnar sclereids of Hakea, and the hair-like trichosclereids that branch into air chambers within the leaves of the water lily and yellow pond lily. Sclereids can also form part of or the entire epidermis of foliar structures such as the clove scales of Allium sativum.

Especially interesting are the sclereids in olive leaves. They are typically 1 mm (0.039 in) in length and are thus named fiberlike sclereids. These sclereids permeate the mesophyll as a dense mat. During sclerification these fiberlike sclereid cells can increase by several hundred times their original size, compared to other parenchyma cells that only increase by two or three times.

== Fruit sclereids ==
Sclereids in fruits vary in form and use. In pears, sclereids form concentric clusters that grow about earlier formed sclereids. These pear sclereids, as well as sclereids within quince fruit, often form bordered pits when the cell wall increases in thickness during sclerification. In apples, layers of elongated sclereids form the endocarp that encloses the seeds.

== Seed sclereids ==
The hardening of seed coats during ripening often occurs through sclerification, when the secondary cell walls are thickened in the epidermis and below the epidermis. Leguminous seeds are examples of such sclerification. Larger sclereids form columns in the epidermis of pea, bean, and soybean seeds, and bone-shaped osteosclereids occur beneath the epidermis. In the seed coats of coconuts, sclereids possess numerous bordered pits. These larger macrosclereids found in seed coats are of protodermal origin.
