= XEG =

XEG may refer to:

- Xyloglucan-specific endo-beta-1,4-glucanase, an enzyme
- XEG-AM, a Guadalupe, Mexico, radio station
- XEG, IATA Code of Kingston, Ontario Railway Station
