= Xyloglucan 4-glucosyltransferase =

Class of enzymes

Identifiers
- EC no.: 2.4.1.168
- CAS no.: 80237-91-8

Databases
- IntEnz: IntEnz view
- BRENDA: BRENDA entry
- ExPASy: NiceZyme view
- KEGG: KEGG entry
- MetaCyc: metabolic pathway
- PRIAM: profile
- PDB structures: RCSB PDB PDBe PDBsum
Search
- PMC: articles
- PubMed: articles
- NCBI: proteins

In enzymology, a xyloglucan 4-glucosyltransferase (EC 2.4.1.168) is an enzyme that catalyzes the chemical reaction in which a beta-D-glucosyl residue is transferred from UDP-glucose to another glucose residue in xyloglucan, linked by a beta-1,4-D-glucosyl-D-glucose bond.

This enzyme belongs to the family of glycosyltransferases, specifically the hexosyltransferases. The systematic name of this enzyme class is UDP-glucose:xyloglucan 1,4-beta-D-glucosyltransferase. Other names in common use include uridine diphosphoglucose-xyloglucan 4beta-glucosyltransferase, xyloglucan 4beta-D-glucosyltransferase, and xyloglucan glucosyltransferase.
