= Medullary ray (botany) =

Cellular structures found in some woods

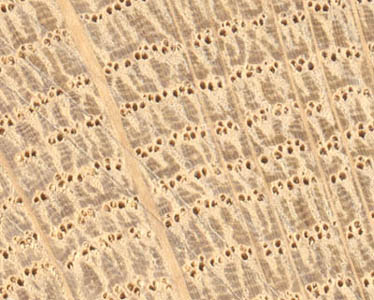
Transverse section of white oak, Quercus alba. A ray appears diagonally, from top left to bottom middle.

Medullary rays, also known as vascular rays or pith rays, are cellular structures found in some species of wood. They appear as radial planar structures, perpendicular to the growth rings, which are visible to the naked eye. In a transverse section (perpendicular to the vertical axis of a tree trunk, and so horizontal) they appear as radiating lines from the centre of the log. In an axial section (vertical and through the center, and so on a radius) they may appear as a variety of transverse markings, depending on how close the section is to the plane of the ray. In a tangential section (vertical and perpendicular to a radius) they may be hard to see at all.

They are formed by the activity of vascular cambium. During the process of the division of cambium, the cambium cuts out cells on both the outer and inner side. These cells are parenchymatous. Most of these cells transform into xylem and phloem. But certain cells don't transform into xylem and phloem and remain as such. Those cells cut out by the cambium towards the periphery are phloem parenchyma while those towards the pith are xylem parenchyma. Both of these cells together work as secondary medullary rays.

These medullary or pith rays are essential for the radial conduction of the water, minerals and other organic substances. They transport the substances from center to periphery.

In this context, the term refers to radial sheets or ribbons extending vertically through the tree across and perpendicular to the growth rings. Also called pith rays or wood rays, these formations of primarily parenchyma cells allow the radial transport of sap and are essential in the process of tylosis.

In quartersawn material, where the wood is cut into boards with the growth rings roughly perpendicular to the face of the board, the medullary rays often produce beautiful figure such as silver grain, medullary spots, pith flecks, etc.
