= Xyloglucan-specific exo-beta-1,4-glucanase =

Enzyme

Identifiers
- EC no.: 3.2.1.155

Databases
- IntEnz: IntEnz view
- BRENDA: BRENDA entry
- ExPASy: NiceZyme view
- KEGG: KEGG entry
- MetaCyc: metabolic pathway
- PRIAM: profile
- PDB structures: RCSB PDB PDBe PDBsum
Search
- PMC: articles
- PubMed: articles
- NCBI: proteins

In enzymology, a xyloglucan-specific exo-beta-1,4-glucanase (EC 3.2.1.155) is an enzyme that catalyzes the chemical reaction

xyloglucan + H_{2}O $\rightleftharpoons$ xyloglucan oligosaccharides (exohydrolysis of 1,4-beta-D-glucosidic linkages in xyloglucan)

Thus, the two substrates of this enzyme are xyloglucan and H_{2}O, and its products are xyloglucan oligosaccharides (exohydrolysis of 1,4-beta-D-glucosidic linkages in xyloglucan).

This enzyme belongs to the family of hydrolases, specifically those glycosidases that hydrolyse O- and S-glycosyl compounds. The systematic name of this enzyme class is [(1->6)-alpha-D-xylo]-(1->4)-beta-D-glucan exo-glucohydrolase. This enzyme is also called Cel74A.
