= Ground tissue =

Category of tissue in plants

Flax stem cross-section: 1. Pith; 2. Protoxylem; 3. Xylem; 4. Phloem; 5. Sclerenchyma (bast fibre); 6. Cortex; 7. Epidermis

The ground tissue of plants includes all tissues that are neither dermal nor vascular. The ground tissue is one of three main tissue systems: protective, ground, and vascular, each tissue system has a different role and functionality inside plant tissues. The protective system prevents dehydration and loss of water, the vascular system of transportation of water and molecules to maintain communication in various plant organs, the ground tissue is responsible for structural support as well as strength, metabolic activity, storage and photosynthesis. It can be divided into three types based on the nature of the cell walls. This tissue system is present between the dermal tissue and forms the main bulk of the plant body.

1. Parenchyma cells have thin primary walls and usually remain alive after they become mature. Parenchyma forms the "filler" tissue in the soft parts of plants, and is usually present in cortex, pericycle, pith, and medullary rays in primary stem and root.
2. Collenchyma cells have thin primary walls with some areas of secondary thickening. Collenchyma provides extra mechanical and structural support, particularly in regions of new growth.
3. Sclerenchyma cells have thick lignified secondary walls and often die when mature. Sclerenchyma provides the main structural support to the plant.
4. Aerenchyma cells are found in aquatic plants. They are also known to be parenchyma cells with large air cavities surrounded by irregular cells which form columns called trabeculae.
Cross section of a leaf showing various ground tissue types

== Parenchyma ==
Parenchyma is a versatile ground tissue that generally constitutes the "filler" tissue in soft parts of plants. It forms, among other things, the cortex (outer region) and pith (central region) of stems, the cortex of roots, the mesophyll of leaves, the pulp of fruits, and the endosperm of seeds. Parenchyma cells are often living cells and may remain meristematic, meaning that they are capable of cell division if stimulated. They have thin and flexible cellulose cell walls and are generally polyhedral when close-packed, but can be roughly spherical when isolated from their neighbors. Parenchyma cells are generally large. They have large central vacuoles, which allow the cells to store and regulate ions, waste products, and water. Tissue specialised for food storage is commonly formed of parenchyma cells.

Parenchyma cells have a variety of functions:

- In leaves, they form two layers of mesophyll cells immediately beneath the epidermis of the leaf, that are responsible for photosynthesis and the exchange of gases. These layers are called the palisade parenchyma and spongy mesophyll. Palisade parenchyma cells can be either cuboidal or elongated. Parenchyma cells in the mesophyll of leaves are specialised parenchyma cells called chlorenchyma cells (parenchyma cells with chloroplasts). Parenchyma cells are also found in other parts of the plant.
- Storage of starch, protein, fats, oils and water in roots, tubers (e.g. potatoes), seed endosperm (e.g. cereals) and cotyledons (e.g. pulses and peanuts)
- Secretion (e.g. the parenchyma cells lining the inside of resin ducts)
- Wound repair and the potential for renewed meristematic activity
- Other specialised functions such as aeration (aerenchyma) provides buoyancy and helps aquatic plants float.
- Chlorenchyma cells carry out photosynthesis and manufacture food.

The shape of parenchyma cells varies with their function. In the spongy mesophyll of a leaf, parenchyma cells range from near-spherical and loosely arranged with large intercellular spaces, to branched or stellate, mutually interconnected with their neighbours at the ends of their arms to form a three-dimensional network, like in the red kidney bean Phaseolus vulgaris and other mesophytes. These cells, along with the epidermal guard cells of the stoma, form a system of air spaces and chambers that regulate the exchange of gases. In some works, the cells of the leaf epidermis are regarded as specialised parenchymal cells, but the modern preference has long been to classify the epidermis as plant dermal tissue, and parenchyma as ground tissue.

Shapes of parenchyma:

- Polyhedral (found in pallisade tissue of the leaf)
- Spherical
- Stellate (found in stem of plants and have well-developed air spaces between them)
- Elongated (also found in pallisade tissue of leaf)
- Lobed (found in spongy and pallisade mesophyll tissue of some plants)

== Collenchyma ==
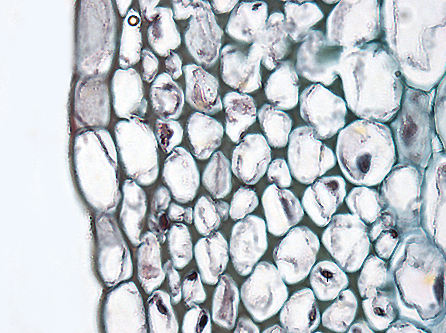
Cross section of collenchyma cells

plant primary cell wall structure

Collenchyma tissue is composed of elongated cells with irregularly thickened walls. They provide structural support, particularly in growing shoots and leaves (as seen, for example, the resilient strands in stalks of celery). Collenchyma cells are usually living, and have only a thick primary cell wall made up of cellulose and pectin. Cell wall thickness is strongly affected by mechanical stress upon the plant. The walls of collenchyma in shaken plants (to mimic the effects of wind etc.), may be 40–100% thicker than those not shaken.

There are four main types of collenchyma:

- Angular collenchyma (thickened at intercellular contact points)
- Tangential collenchyma (cells arranged into ordered rows and thickened at the tangential face of the cell wall)
- Annular collenchyma (uniformly thickened cell walls)
- Lacunar collenchyma (collenchyma with intercellular spaces)

Collenchyma cells are most often found adjacent to outer growing tissues such as the vascular cambium and are known for increasing structural support and integrity.

The first use of "collenchyma" (/kəˈlɛŋkɪmə, kɒ-/) was by Link (1837) who used it to describe the sticky substance on Bletia (Orchidaceae) pollen. Complaining about Link's excessive nomenclature, Schleiden (1839) stated mockingly that the term "collenchyma" could have more easily been used to describe elongated sub-epidermal cells with unevenly thickened cell walls.

== Sclerenchyma ==
Sclerenchyma is the tissue which makes the plant hard and stiff. Sclerenchyma is the supporting tissue and contributes to the mechanical behaviour of plants. Two types of sclerenchyma cells exist: cellular fibers and sclereids. Their cell walls consist of cellulose, hemicellulose, and lignin. Sclerenchyma cells are the principal supporting cells in plant tissues that have ceased elongation. In fruit peduncles (stalk), sclereids often develop from cortical parenchyma and form rings or bands together with sclerenchyma fibres. Experiments in apple fruit have shown that fibres maintain stiffness and tensile strength of the peduncle, while sclereids are especially effective in building resistance to bending and in damping oscillations caused by wind. In this way, sclereids help peduncles to support the growing mass of developing fruits while holding enough flexibility to avoid mechanical failure and preventing them from breaking due to loads caused by the fruit weight and winds. Sclerenchyma fibers are of great economic importance, since they constitute the source material for many fabrics (e.g. flax, hemp, jute, and ramie).

Unlike the collenchyma, mature sclerenchyma is composed of dead cells with extremely thick cell walls (secondary walls) that make up to 90% of the whole cell volume. The term sclerenchyma is derived from the Greek σκληρός (sklērós), meaning "hard." It is the hard, thick walls that make sclerenchyma cells important strengthening and supporting elements in plant parts that have ceased elongation. The difference between sclereids is not always clear: transitions do exist, sometimes even within the same plant.

=== Fibers ===
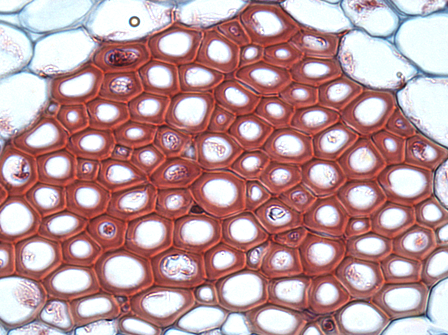
Cross section of sclerenchyma fibers

Sclerenchyma fibers are divided into two main groups with slight differences in their chemical structure and mechanical features.

Soft fibers or bast are usually found in dicots. They are generally long, slender, so-called prosenchymatous cells, usually occurring in strands or bundles. Such bundles or the totality of a stem's bundles are colloquially called fibers. Their high load-bearing capacity and the ease with which they can be processed has since antiquity made them the source material for a number of things, like ropes, fabrics and mattresses. The fibers of flax (Linum usitatissimum) have been known in Europe and Egypt for more than 3,000 years, those of hemp (Cannabis sativa) in China for just as long. These fibers, and those of jute (Corchorus capsularis) and ramie (Boehmeria nivea, a nettle), are extremely soft and elastic since they are made primarily of cellulose, and are especially well suited for the processing to textiles. Their principal cell wall material is cellulose.

Hard fibers are mostly found in monocots. Typical examples are the fiber of many grasses, Agave sisalana (sisal), Yucca or Phormium tenax, Musa textilis and others. Their cell walls contain, besides cellulose, a high proportion of lignin. The load-bearing capacity of Phormium tenax is as high as 20–25 kg/mm², the same as that of good steel wire (25 kg/mm²), but the fibre tears as soon as too great a strain is placed upon it, while the wire distorts and does not tear before a strain of 80 kg/mm². The thickening of a cell wall has been studied in Linum. Starting at the centre of the fiber, the thickening layers of the secondary wall are deposited one after the other. Growth at both tips of the cell leads to simultaneous elongation. During development the layers of secondary material seem like tubes, of which the outer one is always longer and older than the next. After completion of growth, the missing parts are supplemented, so that the wall is evenly thickened up to the tips of the fibers.

Fibers usually originate from meristematic tissues. Cambium and procambium are their main centers of production. They are usually associated with the xylem and phloem of the vascular bundles. The fibers of the xylem are always lignified, while those of the phloem are cellulosic. Reliable evidence for the fibre cells' evolutionary origin from tracheids exists. During evolution the strength of the tracheid cell walls was enhanced, the ability to conduct water was lost and the size of the pits was reduced. Fibers that do not belong to the xylem are bast (outside the ring of cambium) and such fibers that are arranged in characteristic patterns at different sites of the shoot. The term "sclerenchyma" (originally Sclerenchyma) was introduced by Mettenius in 1865.

=== Sclereids ===
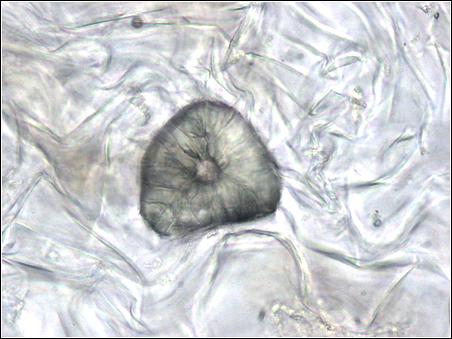
Fresh mount of a sclereid

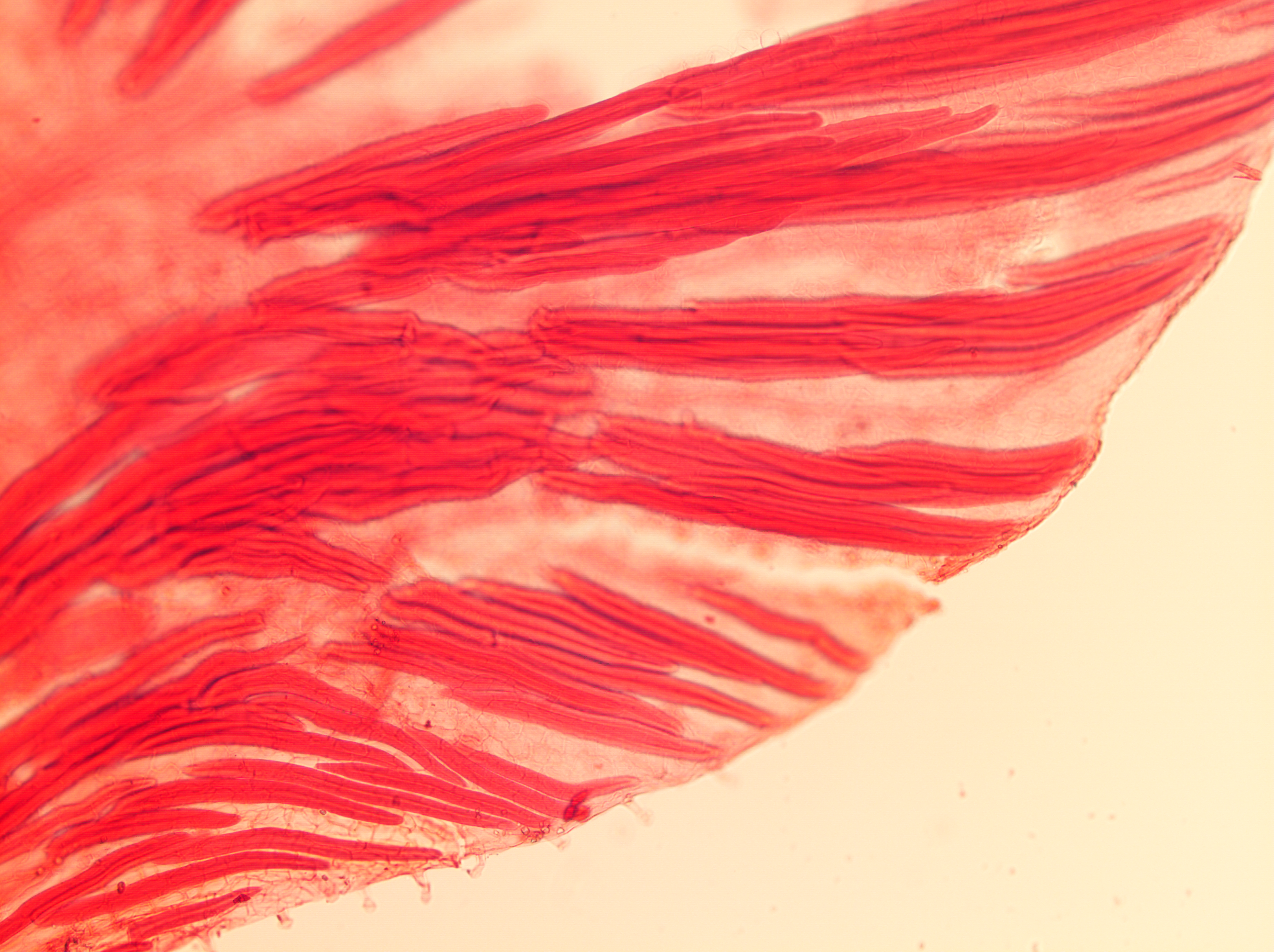
Long, tapered sclereids supporting a leaf edge in Dionysia kossinskyi

Sclereids are the reduced form of sclerenchyma cells with highly thickened, lignified walls.

They are small bundles of sclerenchyma tissue in plants that form durable layers, such as the cores of apples and the gritty texture of pears (Pyrus communis). Sclereids are variable in shape. The cells can be isodiametric, prosenchymatic, forked or elaborately branched. They can be grouped into bundles, can form complete tubes located at the periphery or can occur as single cells or small groups of cells within parenchyma tissues. But compared with most fibres, sclereids are relatively short. Characteristic examples are brachysclereids or the stone cells (called stone cells because of their hardness) of pears and quinces (Cydonia oblonga) and those of the shoot of the wax plant (Hoya carnosa). The cell walls fill nearly all the cell's volume. A layering of the walls and the existence of branched pits is clearly visible. Branched pits such as these are called ramiform pits. The shell of many seeds like those of nuts as well as the stones of drupes like cherries and plums are made up from sclereids.

These structures are used to protect other cells.

== Economic and industrial importance ==
=== In the automotive industry ===
Due to their environmentally friendliness, outstanding engineering abilities, and easy to process nature, sclerenchyma fibers have found broadly expanding applications in composites and engineering materials. Natural Fiber Reinforced Polymer Composites (NFRPCs) have gained popularity, they answered the necessity of the automotive industry to seek innovative solutions using sustainable materials for light weighting and eco friendly. In the automotive industry, NFRPC are used in many vehicle parts. Studies on flax fiber blend with vinyl ester resin composites show the vehicle's hood that weigh about 30% less than steel, which improves lightweight design, and associated with better fuel efficiency and lower CO2 release over the vehicels life cycle, maintaining sustainability. other similar composites: plastics merged with flax, sisal, hemp fibers, and other plants fibers, are also found in dashboards, door panels, headliners, and under floor parts.
