= Root pressure =

Transverse osmotic pressure within the cells of a root system

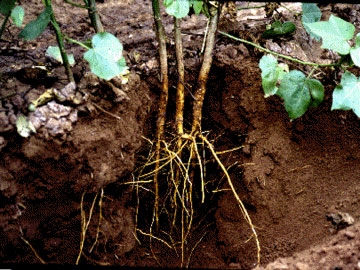
Primary and secondary roots in a cotton plant

Root pressure is the transverse osmotic pressure within the cells of a root system that causes sap to rise through a plant stem to the leaves.

Root pressure occurs in the xylem of some vascular plants when the soil moisture level is high either at night or when transpiration is low during the daytime. When transpiration is high, xylem sap is usually under tension, rather than under pressure, due to transpirational pull. At night in some plants, root pressure causes guttation or exudation of drops of xylem sap from the tips or edges of leaves. Root pressure is studied by removing the shoot of a plant near the soil level. Xylem sap will exude from the cut stem for hours or days due to root pressure. If a pressure gauge is attached to the cut stem, the root pressure can be measured.

Root pressure is caused by active distribution of mineral nutrient ions into the root xylem. Without transpiration to carry the ions up the stem, they accumulate in the root xylem and lower the water potential. Water then diffuses from the soil into the root xylem due to osmosis. Root pressure is caused by this accumulation of water in the xylem pushing on the rigid cells. Root pressure provides a force, which pushes water up the stem, but it is not enough to account for the movement of water to leaves at the top of the tallest trees. The maximum root pressure measured in some plants can raise water only to 6.87 meters, and the tallest trees are over 100 meters tall.

== Role of endodermis ==
The endodermis in the root is important in the development of root pressure. The endodermis is a single layer of cells between the cortex and the pericycle. These cells allow water movement until it reaches the Casparian strip, made of suberin, a waterproof substance. The Casparian strip prevents mineral nutrient ions from moving passively through the endodermal cell walls. Water and ions move in these cell walls via the apoplast pathway. Ions outside the endodermis must be actively transported across an endodermal cell membrane to enter or exit the endodermis. Once inside the endodermis, the ions are in the symplast pathway. They cannot diffuse back out again but can move from cell to cell via plasmodesmata or be actively transported into the xylem. Once in the xylem vessels or tracheids, ions are again in the apoplast pathway. Xylem vessels and tracheids transport water up the plant but lack cell membranes. The Casparian strip substitutes for their lack of cell membranes and prevents accumulated ions from diffusing passively in apoplast pathway out of the endodermis. The ions accumulating interior to the endodermis in the xylem create a water potential gradient and by osmosis, water diffuses from the moist soil, across the cortex, through the endodermis and into the xylem.

Root pressure can transport water and dissolved mineral nutrients from roots through the xylem to the tops of relatively short plants when transpiration is low or zero. The maximum root pressure measured is about 0.6 megapascals but some species never generate any root pressure. The main contributor to the movement of water and mineral nutrients upward in vascular plants is considered to be the transpirational pull. However, sunflower plants grown in 100% relative humidity grew normally and accumulated the same amount of mineral nutrients as plants in normal humidity, which had a transpiration rate 10 to 15 times the plants in 100% humidity. Thus, transpiration may not be as important in upward mineral nutrient transport in relatively short plants as often assumed.

Xylem vessels sometimes empty over winter. Root pressure may be important in refilling the xylem vessels. However, in some species vessels refill without root pressure.

Root pressure is often high in some deciduous trees before they leaf out. Transpiration is minimal without leaves, and organic solutes are being mobilized so decrease the xylem water potential. Sugar maple accumulates high concentrations of sugars in its xylem early in the spring, which is the source of maple sugar. Some trees "bleed" xylem sap profusely when their stems are pruned in late winter or early spring, e.g. maple and elm. Such bleeding is similar to root pressure only sugars, rather than ions, may lower the xylem water potential. In the unique case of maple trees, sap bleeding is caused by changes in stem pressure and not root pressure.

It is very likely that all grasses produce root pressure. In bamboos, root pressure is correlated with maximum height of a clone.
