= Xyloglucan-specific endo-beta-1,4-glucanase =

Identifiers
- EC no.: 3.2.1.151

Databases
- IntEnz: IntEnz view
- BRENDA: BRENDA entry
- ExPASy: NiceZyme view
- KEGG: KEGG entry
- MetaCyc: metabolic pathway
- PRIAM: profile
- PDB structures: RCSB PDB PDBe PDBsum
Search
- PMC: articles
- PubMed: articles
- NCBI: proteins

In enzymology, a xyloglucan-specific endo-beta-1,4-glucanase (EC 3.2.1.151) is an enzyme that catalyzes the chemical reaction

xyloglucan + H_{2}O $\rightleftharpoons$ xyloglucan oligosaccharides

Thus, the two substrates of this enzyme are xyloglucan and H_{2}O, whereas its product is xyloglucan oligosaccharides.

This enzyme belongs to the family of hydrolases, specifically those glycosidases that hydrolyse O- and S-glycosyl compounds. The systematic name of this enzyme class is [(1->6)-alpha-D-xylo]-(1->4)-beta-D-glucan glucanohydrolase. Other names in common use include XEG, xyloglucan endo-beta-1,4-glucanase, xyloglucanase, xyloglucanendohydrolase, XH, and 1,4-beta-D-glucan glucanohydrolase.

Family 12 was first identified in plant pathogens by discovery in Phytophthora spp.

== Structural studies ==
As of late 2007, 15 structures have been solved for this class of enzymes, with PDB accession codes 2CN2, 2CN3, 2E0P, 2E4T, 2EEX, 2EJ1, 2EO7, 2EQD, 2JEM, 2JEN, 2JEP, 2JEQ, 2UWA, 2UWB, and 2UWC.
