= Xylem =

Water transport tissue in vascular plants

Xylem (blue) transports water and minerals from the roots upwards.

Xylem is one of the two types of transport tissue in vascular plants, the other being phloem; both of these are part of the vascular bundle. The basic function of the xylem is to transport water upward from the roots to parts of the plants such as stems and leaves, but it also transports nutrients.

== Etymology ==
The word xylem is derived from the Ancient Greek word ξύλον (xúlon), meaning "wood"; the best-known xylem tissue is wood, though it is found throughout a plant. The terms xylem and phloem were introduced by Swiss botanist Carl Nägeli in 1858.

== Structure ==
Diagrammatic structure of xylem cells

The most distinctive xylem cells are the long tracheary elements that transport water. Tracheids and vessel elements are distinguished by their shape; vessel elements are shorter, and are connected together into long tubes that are called vessels.

Wood also contains two other type of cells: parenchyma and fibers.

Xylem can be found:

- in vascular bundles, present in non-woody plants and non-woody parts of woody plants
- in secondary xylem, laid down by a meristem called the vascular cambium in woody plants
- as part of a stelar arrangement not divided into bundles, as in many ferns.

In transitional stages of plants with secondary growth, the first two categories are not mutually exclusive, although usually a vascular bundle will contain primary xylem only.

The branching pattern exhibited by xylem follows Murray's law.

== Primary and secondary xylem ==
Primary xylem is formed during primary growth from procambium. It includes protoxylem and metaxylem. Metaxylem develops after the protoxylem but before secondary xylem. Metaxylem has wider vessels and tracheids than protoxylem.

Secondary xylem is formed during secondary growth from vascular cambium. Although secondary xylem is also found in members of the gymnosperm groups Gnetophyta and Ginkgophyta and to a lesser extent in members of the Cycadophyta, the two main groups in which secondary xylem can be found are:

1. conifers (Coniferae): there are approximately 600 known species of conifers. All species have secondary xylem, which is relatively uniform in structure throughout this group. Many conifers become tall trees: the secondary xylem of such trees is used and marketed as softwood.
2. angiosperms (Angiospermae): there are approximately 250,000 known species of angiosperms. Within this group secondary xylem is rare in the monocots. Many non-monocot angiosperms become trees, and the secondary xylem of these is used and marketed as hardwood.

== Main function – upwards water transport ==
The xylem, vessels and tracheids of the roots, stems and leaves are interconnected to form a continuous system of water-conducting channels reaching all parts of the plants. The system transports water and soluble mineral nutrients from the roots throughout the plant. It is also used to replace water lost during transpiration and photosynthesis. Xylem sap consists mainly of water and inorganic ions, although it can also contain a number of organic chemicals as well. The transport is passive, not powered by energy spent by the tracheary elements themselves, which are dead by maturity and no longer have living contents. Transporting sap upwards becomes more difficult as the height of a plant increases and upwards transport of water by xylem is considered to limit the maximum height of trees. Three phenomena cause xylem sap to flow:

- Pressure flow hypothesis: Sugars produced in the leaves and other green tissues are kept in the phloem system, creating a solute pressure differential versus the xylem system carrying a far lower load of solutes—water and minerals. The phloem pressure can rise to several MPa, far higher than atmospheric pressure. Selective interconnection between these systems allows this high solute concentration in the phloem to draw xylem fluid upwards by negative pressure.
- Transpirational pull: Similarly, the evaporation of water from the surfaces of mesophyll cells to the atmosphere also creates a negative pressure at the top of a plant. This causes millions of minute menisci to form in the mesophyll cell wall. The resulting surface tension causes a negative pressure or tension in the xylem that pulls the water from the roots and soil.
- Root pressure: If the water potential of the root cells is more negative than that of the soil, usually due to high concentrations of solute, water can move by osmosis into the root from the soil. This causes a positive pressure that forces sap up the xylem towards the leaves. In some circumstances, the sap will be forced from the leaf through a hydathode in a phenomenon known as guttation. Root pressure is highest in the morning before the opening of stomata and allow transpiration to begin. Different plant species can have different root pressures even in a similar environment; examples include up to 145 kPa in Vitis riparia but around zero in Celastrus orbiculatus.

The primary force that creates the capillary action movement of water upwards in plants is the adhesion between the water and the surface of the xylem conduits. Capillary action provides the force that establishes an equilibrium configuration, balancing gravity. When transpiration removes water at the top, the flow is needed to return to the equilibrium.

Transpirational pull results from the evaporation of water from the surfaces of cells in the leaves. This evaporation causes the surface of the water to recess into the pores of the cell wall. By capillary action, the water forms concave menisci inside the pores. The high surface tension of water pulls the concavity outwards, generating enough force to lift water as high as a hundred meters from ground level to a tree's highest branches.

Transpirational pull requires that the vessels transporting the water be very small in diameter; otherwise, cavitation would break the water column. And as water evaporates from leaves, more is drawn up through the plant to replace it. When the water pressure within the xylem reaches extreme levels due to low water input from the roots (if, for example, the soil is dry), then the gases come out of solution and form a bubble – an embolism forms, which will spread quickly to other adjacent cells, unless bordered pits are present (these have a plug-like structure called a torus, that seals off the opening between adjacent cells and stops the embolism from spreading). Even after an embolism has occurred, plants are able to refill the xylem and restore the functionality.

=== Cohesion-tension theory ===
The cohesion-tension theory is a theory of intermolecular attraction that explains the process of water flow upwards (against the force of gravity) through the xylem of plants. It was proposed in 1894 by John Joly and Henry Horatio Dixon. Despite numerous objections, this is the most widely accepted theory for the transport of water through a plant's vascular system based on the classical research of Dixon-Joly (1894), Eugen Askenasy (1845–1903) (1895), and Dixon (1914,1924).

Water is a polar molecule. When two water molecules approach one another, the slightly negatively charged oxygen atom of one forms a hydrogen bond with a slightly positively charged hydrogen atom in the other. This attractive force, along with other intermolecular forces, is one of the principal factors responsible for the occurrence of surface tension in liquid water. It also allows plants to draw water from the root through the xylem to the leaf.

Water is constantly lost through transpiration from the leaf. When one water molecule is lost another is pulled along by the processes of cohesion and tension. Transpiration pull, utilizing capillary action and the inherent surface tension of water, is the primary mechanism of water movement in plants. However, it is not the only mechanism involved. Any use of water in leaves forces water to move into them.

Transpiration in leaves creates tension (differential pressure) in the cell walls of mesophyll cells. Because of this tension, water is being pulled up from the roots into the leaves, helped by cohesion (the pull between individual water molecules, due to hydrogen bonds) and adhesion (the stickiness between water molecules and the hydrophilic cell walls of plants). This mechanism of water flow works because of water potential (water flows from high to low potential), and the rules of simple diffusion.

Over the past century, there has been a great deal of research regarding the mechanism of xylem sap transport; today, most plant scientists continue to agree that the cohesion-tension theory best explains this process, but multiforce theories that hypothesize several alternative mechanisms have been suggested, including longitudinal cellular and xylem osmotic pressure gradients, axial potential gradients in the vessels, and gel- and gas-bubble-supported interfacial gradients.

=== Measurement of pressure ===
A diagram showing the setup of a pressure bomb

Until recently, the differential pressure (suction) of transpirational pull could only be measured indirectly, by applying external pressure with a pressure bomb to counteract it. When the technology to perform direct measurements with a pressure probe was developed, there was initially some doubt about whether the classic theory was correct, because some workers were unable to demonstrate negative pressures. More recent measurements do tend to validate the classic theory, for the most part. Xylem transport is driven by a combination of transpirational pull from above and root pressure from below, which makes the interpretation of measurements more complicated.

== Evolution ==
Xylem appeared early in the history of terrestrial plant life. Fossil plants with anatomically preserved xylem are known from the Silurian (more than 400 million years ago), and trace fossils resembling individual xylem cells may be found in earlier Ordovician rocks. The earliest true and recognizable xylem consists of tracheids with a helical-annular reinforcing layer added to the cell wall. This is the only type of xylem found in the earliest vascular plants, and this type of cell continues to be found in the protoxylem (first-formed xylem) of all living groups of vascular plants. Several groups of plants later developed pitted tracheid cells independently through convergent evolution. In living plants, pitted tracheids do not appear in development until the maturation of the metaxylem (following the protoxylem).

In most plants, pitted tracheids function as the primary transport cells. The other type of vascular element, found in angiosperms, is the vessel element. Vessel elements are joined end to end to form vessels in which water flows unimpeded, as in a pipe. The presence of xylem vessels (also called trachea) is considered to be one of the key innovations that led to the success of the angiosperms. However, the occurrence of vessel elements is not restricted to angiosperms, and they are absent in some archaic or "basal" lineages of the angiosperms: (e.g., Amborellaceae, Tetracentraceae, Trochodendraceae, and Winteraceae), and their secondary xylem is described by Arthur Cronquist as "primitively vesselless". Cronquist considered the vessels of Gnetum to be convergent with those of angiosperms. Whether the absence of vessels in basal angiosperms is a primitive condition is contested, the alternative hypothesis states that vessel elements originated in a precursor to the angiosperms and were subsequently lost.

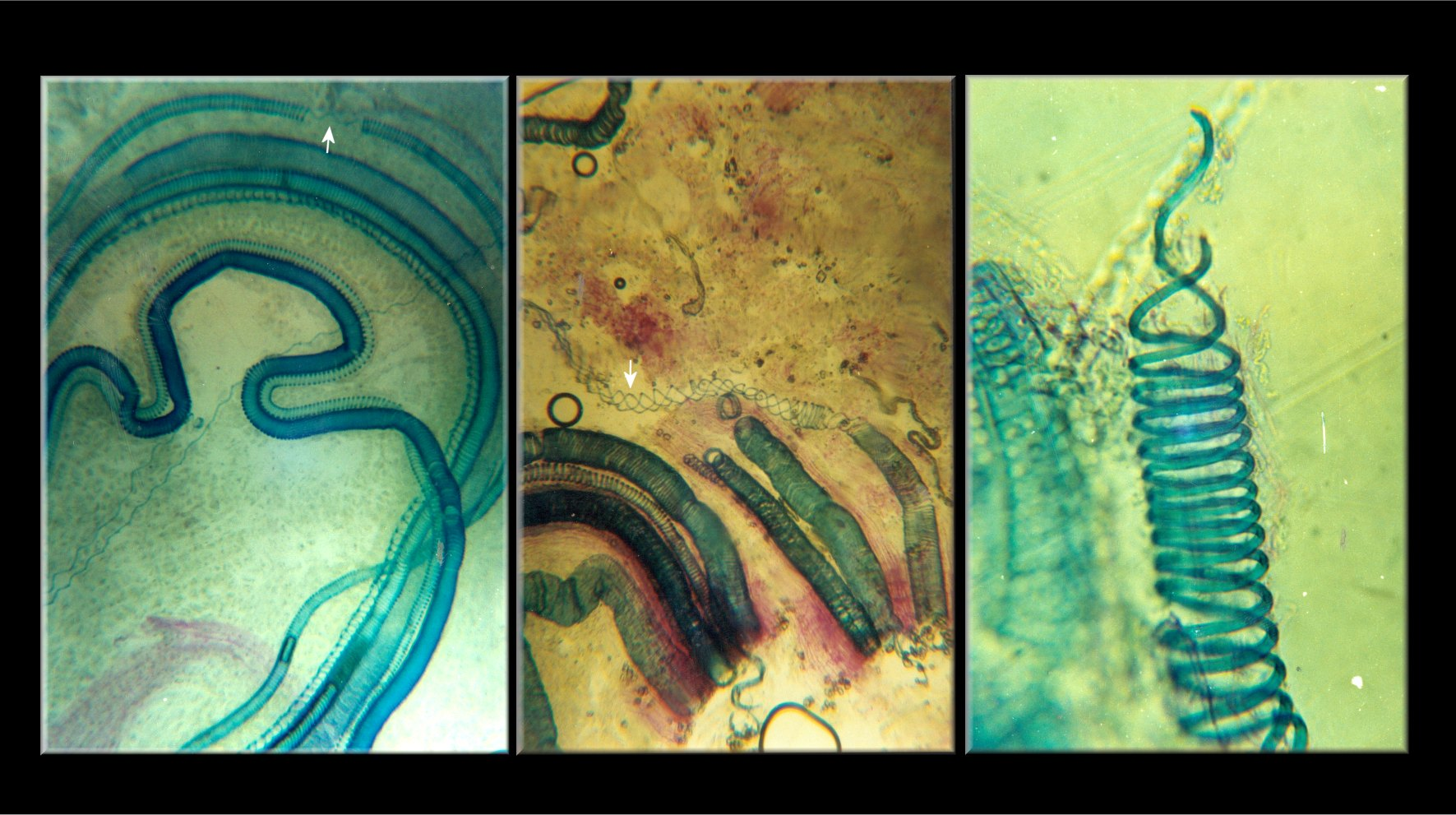
Photos showing xylem elements in the shoot of a fig tree (Ficus alba): crushed in hydrochloric acid, between slides and cover slips

To photosynthesize, plants must absorb CO_{2} from the atmosphere. However, this comes at a price: while stomata are open to allow CO_{2} to enter, water can evaporate. Water is lost much faster than CO_{2} is absorbed, so plants need to replace it, and have developed systems to transport water from the moist soil to the site of photosynthesis. Early plants sucked water between the walls of their cells, then evolved the ability to control water loss (and CO_{2} acquisition) through the use of stomata. Specialized water transport tissues soon evolved in the form of hydroids, tracheids, then secondary xylem, followed by an endodermis and ultimately vessels.

The high CO_{2} levels of Silurian-Devonian times, when plants were first colonizing land, meant that the need for water was relatively low. As CO_{2} was withdrawn from the atmosphere by plants, more water was lost in its capture, and more elegant transport mechanisms evolved. As water transport mechanisms, and waterproof cuticles, evolved, plants could survive without being continually covered by a film of water. This transition from poikilohydry to homoiohydry opened up new potential for colonization. Plants then needed a robust internal structure that held long narrow channels for transporting water from the soil to all the different parts of the above-soil plant, especially to the parts where photosynthesis occurred.

During the Silurian, CO_{2} was readily available, so little water needed expending to acquire it. By the end of the Carboniferous, when CO_{2} levels had lowered to something approaching today's, around 17 times more water was lost per unit of CO_{2} uptake. However, even in these "easy" early days, water was at a premium, and had to be transported to parts of the plant from the wet soil to avoid desiccation. This early water transport took advantage of the cohesion-tension mechanism inherent in water. Water has a tendency to diffuse to areas that are drier, and this process is accelerated when water can be wicked along a fabric with small spaces. In small passages, such as that between the plant cell walls (or in tracheids), a column of water behaves like rubber – when molecules evaporate from one end, they pull the molecules behind them along the channels. Therefore, transpiration alone provided the driving force for water transport in early plants. However, without dedicated transport vessels, the cohesion-tension mechanism cannot transport water more than about 2 cm, severely limiting the size of the earliest plants. This process demands a steady supply of water from one end, to maintain the chains; to avoid exhausting it, plants developed a waterproof cuticle. Early cuticle may not have had pores but did not cover the entire plant surface, so that gas exchange could continue. However, dehydration at times was inevitable; early plants cope with this by having a lot of water stored between their cell walls, and when it comes to it sticking out the tough times by putting life "on hold" until more water is supplied.

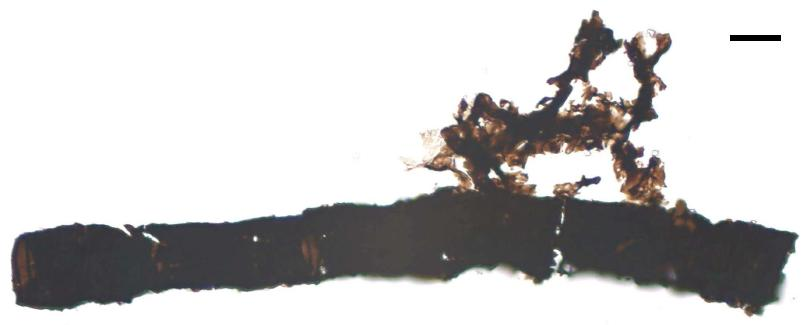
A banded tube from the late Silurian/early Devonian. The bands are difficult to see on this specimen, as an opaque carbonaceous coating conceals much of the tube. Bands are just visible in places on the left half of the image – click on the image for a larger view. Scale bar: 20 μm

To be free from the constraints of small size and constant moisture that the parenchymatic transport system inflicted, plants needed a more efficient water transport system. During the early Silurian, they developed specialized cells, which were lignified (or bore similar chemical compounds) to avoid implosion; this process coincided with cell death, allowing their innards to be emptied and water to be passed through them. These wider, dead, empty cells were a million times more conductive than the inter-cell method, giving the potential for transport over longer distances, and higher CO_{2} diffusion rates.

The earliest macrofossils to bear water-transport tubes are Silurian plants placed in the genus Cooksonia. The early Devonian pretracheophytes Aglaophyton and Horneophyton have structures very similar to the hydroids of modern mosses. Plants continued to innovate new ways of reducing the resistance to flow within their cells, thereby increasing the efficiency of their water transport. Bands on the walls of tubes, in fact apparent from the early Silurian onwards, are an early improvisation to aid the easy flow of water. Banded tubes, as well as tubes with pits in their walls, were lignified and, when they form single celled conduits, are considered to be tracheids. These, the "next generation" of transport cell design, have a more rigid structure than hydroids, allowing them to cope with higher levels of water pressure. Tracheids may have a single evolutionary origin, possibly within the hornworts, uniting all tracheophytes (but they may have evolved more than once).

Water transport requires regulation, and dynamic control is provided by stomata. By adjusting the amount of gas exchange, they can restrict the amount of water lost through transpiration. This is an important role where water supply is not constant, and indeed stomata appear to have evolved before tracheids, being present in the non-vascular hornworts.

An endodermis probably evolved during the Silu-Devonian, but the first fossil evidence for such a structure is Carboniferous. This structure in the roots covers the water transport tissue and regulates ion exchange (and prevents unwanted pathogens etc. from entering the water transport system). The endodermis can also provide an upwards pressure, forcing water out of the roots when transpiration is not enough of a driver.

Once plants had evolved this level of controlled water transport, they were truly homoiohydric, able to extract water from their environment through root-like organs rather than relying on a film of surface moisture, enabling them to grow to much greater size. As a result of their independence from their surroundings, they lost their ability to survive desiccation – a costly trait to retain.

During the Devonian, maximum xylem diameter increased with time, with the minimum diameter remaining pretty constant. By the middle Devonian, the tracheid diameter of some plant lineages (Zosterophyllophytes) had plateaued. Wider tracheids allow water to be transported faster, but the overall transport rate depends also on the overall cross-sectional area of the xylem bundle itself. The increase in vascular bundle thickness further seems to correlate with the width of plant axes, and plant height; it is also closely related to the appearance of leaves and increased stomatal density, both of which would increase the demand for water.

While wider tracheids with robust walls make it possible to achieve higher water transport tensions, this increases the likelihood of cavitation. Cavitation occurs when a bubble of air forms within a vessel, breaking the bonds between chains of water molecules and preventing them from pulling more water up with their cohesive tension. A tracheid, once cavitated, cannot have its embolism removed and return to service (except in a few advanced angiosperms which have developed a mechanism of doing so). Therefore, it is well worth plants' while to avoid cavitation occurring. For this reason, pits in tracheid walls have very small diameters, to prevent air entering and allowing bubbles to nucleate. Freeze-thaw cycles are a major cause of cavitation. Damage to a tracheid's wall almost inevitably leads to air leaking in and cavitation, hence the importance of many tracheids working in parallel.

Once cavitation has occurred, plants have a range of mechanisms to contain the damage. Small pits link adjacent conduits to allow fluid to flow between them, but not air – although these pits, which prevent the spread of embolism, are also a major cause of them. These pitted surfaces further reduce the flow of water through the xylem by as much as 30%. The diversification of xylem strand shapes with tracheid network topologies increasingly resistant to the spread of embolism likely facilitated increases in plant size and the colonization of drier habitats during the Devonian radiation. Conifers, by the Jurassic, developed bordered pits had valve-like structures to isolate cavitated elements. These torus-margo structures have an impermeable disc (torus) suspended by a permeable membrane (margo) between two adjacent pores. When a tracheid on one side depressurizes, the disc is sucked into the pore on that side, and blocks further flow. Other plants simply tolerate cavitation. For instance, oaks grow a ring of wide vessels at the start of each spring, none of which survive the winter frosts. Maples use root pressure each spring to force sap upwards from the roots, squeezing out any air bubbles.

Growing to height also employed another trait of tracheids – the support offered by their lignified walls. Defunct tracheids were retained to form a strong, woody stem, produced in most instances by a secondary xylem. However, in early plants, tracheids were too mechanically vulnerable, and retained a central position, with a layer of tough sclerenchyma on the outer rim of the stems. Even when tracheids do take a structural role, they are supported by sclerenchymatic tissue.

Tracheids end with walls, which impose a great deal of resistance on flow; vessel members have perforated end walls, and are arranged in series to operate as if they were one continuous vessel. The function of end walls, which were the default state in the Devonian, was probably to avoid embolisms. An embolism is where an air bubble is created in a tracheid. This may happen as a result of freezing, or by gases dissolving out of solution. Once an embolism is formed, it usually cannot be removed (but see later); the affected cell cannot pull water up, and is rendered useless.

End walls excluded, the tracheids of prevascular plants were able to operate under the same hydraulic conductivity as those of the first vascular plant, Cooksonia.

The size of tracheids is limited as they comprise a single cell; this limits their length, which in turn limits their maximum useful diameter to 80 μm. Conductivity grows with the fourth power of diameter, so increased diameter has huge rewards; vessel elements, consisting of a number of cells, joined at their ends, overcame this limit and allowed larger tubes to form, reaching diameters of up to 500 μm, and lengths of up to 10 m.

Vessels first evolved during the dry, low CO_{2} periods of the late Permian, in the horsetails, ferns and Selaginellales independently, and later appeared in the mid Cretaceous in angiosperms and gnetophytes. Vessels allow the same cross-sectional area of wood to transport around 100 times more water than tracheids. This allowed plants to fill more of their stems with structural fibers, and also opened a new niche to vines, which could transport water without being as thick as the tree they grew on. Despite these advantages, tracheid-based wood is a lot lighter, thus cheaper to make, as vessels need to be much more reinforced to avoid cavitation.

== Development ==
Patterns of xylem development: xylem in brown; arrows show direction of development from protoxylem to metaxylem.

Xylem development can be described by four terms: centrarch, exarch, endarch and mesarch. As it develops in young plants, its nature changes from protoxylem to metaxylem (i.e. from first xylem to after xylem). The patterns in which protoxylem and metaxylem are arranged are essential in studying plant morphology.

=== Protoxylem and metaxylem ===
As a young vascular plant grows, one or more strands of primary xylem form in its stems and roots. The first xylem to develop is called 'protoxylem'. In appearance, protoxylem is usually distinguished by narrower vessels formed of smaller cells. Some of these cells have walls that contain thickenings in the form of rings or helices. Functionally, protoxylem can extend: the cells can grow in size and develop while a stem or root is elongating. Later, 'metaxylem' develops in the strands of xylem. Metaxylem vessels and cells are usually larger; the cells have thickenings typically either in the form of ladderlike transverse bars (scalariform) or continuous sheets except for holes or pits (pitted). Functionally, metaxylem completes its development after elongation ceases when the cells no longer need to grow in size.

=== Patterns of protoxylem and metaxylem ===
There are four primary patterns to the arrangement of protoxylem and metaxylem in stems and roots.

- Centrarch refers to the case in which the primary xylem forms a single cylinder in the center of the stem and develops from the center outwards. The protoxylem is thus found in the central core, and the metaxylem is in a cylinder around it. This pattern was common in early land plants, such as "rhyniophytes", but is not present in any living plants.

The other three terms are used where there is more than one strand of primary xylem.

- Exarch is used when there is more than one strand of primary xylem in a stem or root, and the xylem develops from the outside inwards towards the center, i.e., centripetally. The metaxylem is thus closest to the center of the stem or root, and the protoxylem is closest to the periphery. The roots of vascular plants are generally considered to have exarch development.
- Endarch is used when there is more than one strand of primary xylem in a stem or root, and the xylem develops from the inside outwards towards the periphery, i.e., centrifugally. The protoxylem is thus closest to the center of the stem or root, and the metaxylem is closest to the periphery. The stems of seed plants typically have endarch development.
- Mesarch is used when there is more than one strand of primary xylem in a stem or root, and the xylem develops from the middle of a strand in both directions. The metaxylem is thus on both the peripheral and central sides of the strand, with the protoxylem between the metaxylem (possibly surrounded by it). The leaves and stems of many ferns have mesarch development.

== History ==
In his book De plantis libri XVI (On Plants, in 16 books) (1583), the Italian physician and botanist Andrea Cesalpino proposed that plants draw water from soil not by magnetism (ut magnes ferrum trahit, as magnetic iron attracts) nor by suction (vacuum), but by absorption, as occurs in the case of linen, sponges, or powders. The Italian biologist Marcello Malpighi was the first person to describe and illustrate xylem vessels, which he did in his book Anatome plantarum ... (1675). (Note: Malpighi first described xylem vessels and named tracheid cells. From p. 8 of (Malpighi, 1675): " ... haec tubulosa sunt & subrotunda, identidem tamen angustantur, & perpetuo patent, nullumque, ut observare potui, effundunt humorem: Argentea lamina L, in spiram contorta, componuntur, ut facile laceratione, (velut in bombycinis tracheis expertus sum,) in hanc oblongam & continuatam fasciam resolvantur. Lamina haec, si ulterius microscopio lustretur, particulis squamatim componitur; quod etiam in tracheis insectorum deprehenditur. Spiralibus hisce vasculis, seu ut verius loquar, tracheis, ligneae fibrae M adstant, quae secundum longitudinem productae, ad majorem firmitudinem & robur, transversalium utriculorum ordines N superequitant, ita ut fiat veluti storea." ( ... these [vessels] are tubular and somewhat round, yet often become narrow, and they are always open, and none, as [far as] I could perceive, exude a liquid: they are composed of silvery sheets L, twisted into a helix, although they can easily be unbound, by tearing, into this somewhat long and connected strip (just as I have done in silkworm treacheas). This sheet, if it be examined further with a microscope, is composed of scale-like particles; which likewise is observed in the tracheas of insects. On these helical vessels, or as I will more rightly say, "tracheas", there stand woody filaments M, which being extended in length straddle – for greater strength and hardness – lines of transverse cells N, so that it is constructed like a mat.)) Although Malpighi believed that xylem contained only air, the British physician and botanist Nehemiah Grew, who was Malpighi's contemporary, believed that sap ascended both through the bark and through the xylem. However, according to Grew, capillary action in the xylem would raise the sap by only a few inches; to raise the sap to the top of a tree, Grew proposed that the parenchymal cells become turgid and thereby not only squeeze the sap in the tracheids but force some sap from the parenchyma into the tracheids. (Note: Grew recognized the limits of capillary action (from p. 126): " ... small Glass-Pipes [i.e., capillary tubes] immersed in Water, will give it [i.e., the water] an ascent for some inches; yet there is a certain period, according to the bore of the Pipe, beyond which it will not rise." Grew proposed the following mechanism for the ascent of sap in plants (from p. 126): "But the Bladders [i.e., parenchymal cells] DP, which surround it [i.e., the column of tracheids], being swelled up and turgid with Sap, do hereby press upon it; and so not only a little contract its bore, but also transfuse or strain some Portion of their Sap thereinto: by both which means, the Sap will be forced to rise higher therein.") In 1727, English clergyman and botanist Stephen Hales showed that transpiration by a plant's leaves causes water to move through its xylem. (Note: Hales explained that although capillary action might help raise water within the xylem, transpiration caused water to actually move through the xylem. From (Hales, 1727), p. 100: "And by the same [capillary] principle it is, that we see in the preceding Experiments plants imbibe moisture so vigorously up their fine capillary vessels; which moisture, as it is carried off in perspiration [i.e., transpiration], (by the action of warmth), thereby gives the sap vessels liberty to be almost continually attracting fresh supplies, which they could not do, if they were fully saturate with moisture: For without perspiration the sap must necessarily stagnate, not withstanding the sap vessels are so curiously adapted by their exceeding fineness, to raise the sap to great heights, in reciprocal proportion to their very minute diameters.") By 1891, the Polish-German botanist Eduard Strasburger had shown that the transport of water in plants did not require the xylem cells to be alive.

== See also ==
- Soil plant atmosphere continuum
- Suction
- Tylosis
- Vascular tissue
- Xylem sap
