= Xyloglucan:xyloglucosyl transferase =

Class of enzymes

xyloglucan:xyloglucosyl transferase

Identifiers
- EC no.: 2.4.1.207

Databases
- IntEnz: IntEnz view
- BRENDA: BRENDA entry
- ExPASy: NiceZyme view
- KEGG: KEGG entry
- MetaCyc: metabolic pathway
- PRIAM: profile
- PDB structures: RCSB PDB PDBe PDBsum
- Gene Ontology: AmiGO / QuickGO
Search
- PMC: articles
- PubMed: articles
- NCBI: proteins

In enzymology, a xyloglucan:xyloglucosyl transferase (EC 2.4.1.207) is an enzyme that catalyzes the chemical reaction in which a beta-(1,4) bond in the backbone of a xyloglucan in broken; the xyloglucanyl segment is then transferred to the O_{4} of the non-reducing terminal glucose residue of either xyloglucan or an oligosaccharide thereof.

This enzyme belongs to the family of glycosyltransferases, specifically the hexosyltransferases. The systematic name of this enzyme class is xyloglucan:xyloglucan xyloglucanotransferase. Other names in common use include endo-xyloglucan transferase, and xyloglucan endotransglycosylase.

== Structural studies ==
As of late 2007, two structures have been solved for this class of enzymes, with PDB accession codes 1UMZ and 1UN1.
