= Vessel element =

Component of Xylem

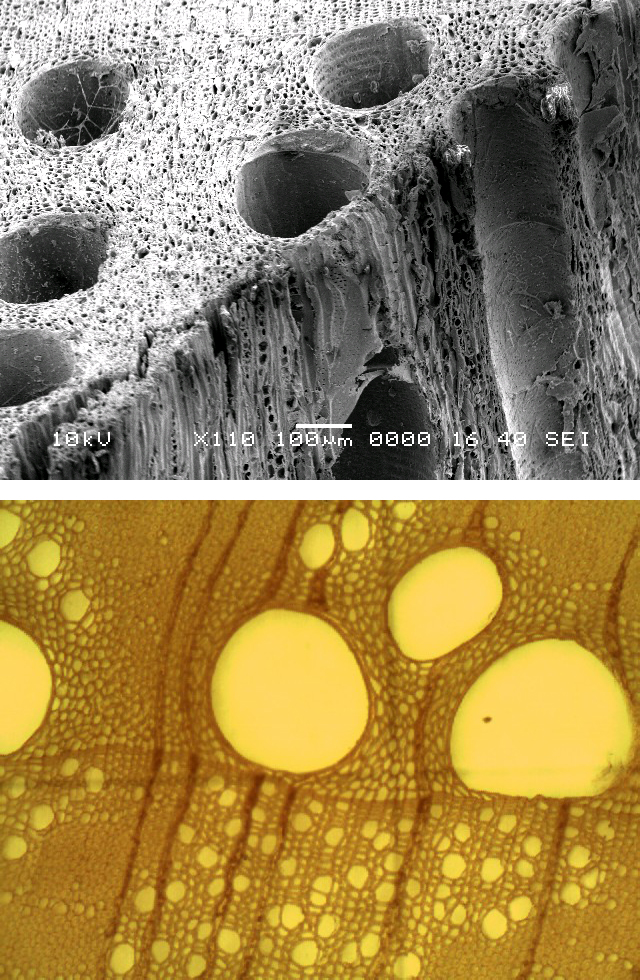
SEM image (top) and Transmission Light Microscope image (bottom) of vessel elements in Oak

A vessel element or vessel member (also called a xylem vessel) is one of the cell types found in xylem, the water conducting tissue of plants. Vessel elements are found in most angiosperms (flowering plants) and in some gymnosperms such as cycads and Ephedra, but absent in conifers. Vessel elements are the main feature distinguishing the "hardwood" of angiosperms from the "softwood" of conifers.

== Anatomy ==
Xylem is the tissue in vascular plants that conducts water (and substances dissolved in it) upwards from the roots to the shoots. Two kinds of cell are involved in xylem transport: tracheids and vessel elements. Vessel elements are the building blocks of vessels, the conducting pathways that constitute the major part of the water transporting system in flowering plants. Vessels form an efficient system for transporting water (including necessary minerals) from the root to the leaves and other parts of the plant.

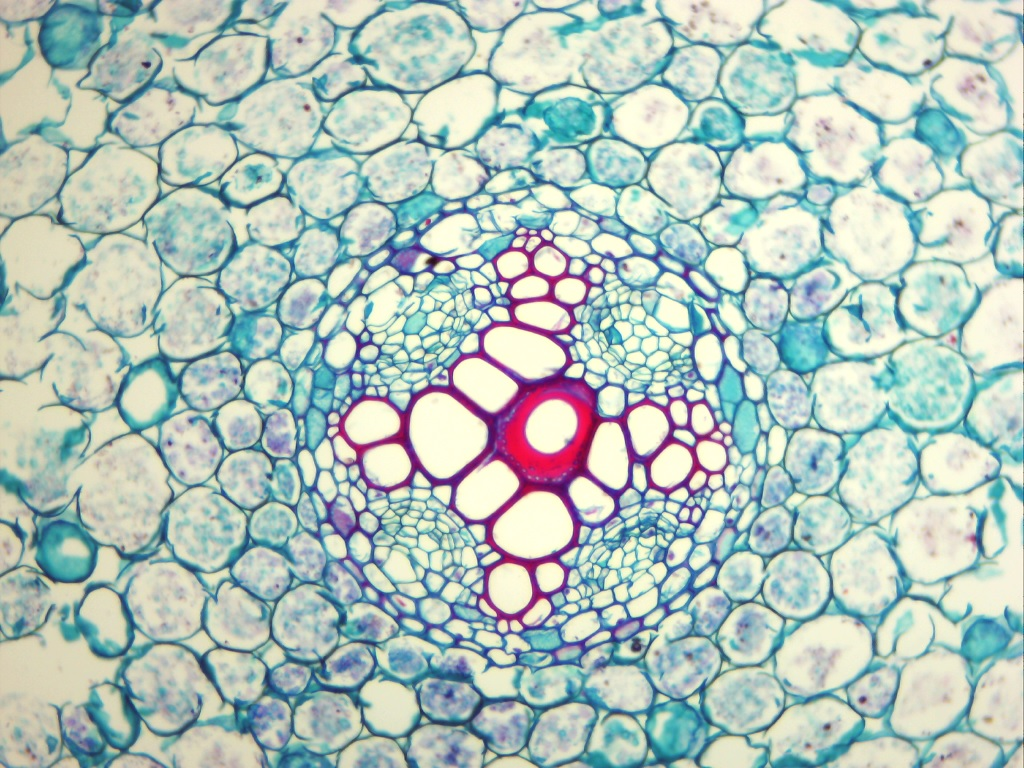
Stained Xylem Vessel in Red/Orange (x400 magnification)

In secondary xylem – the xylem that is produced as a stem thickens rather than when it first appears – a vessel element originates from the vascular cambium. A long cell, oriented along the axis of the stem, called a "fusiform initial", divides along its length forming new vessel elements. The cell wall of a vessel element becomes strongly "lignified", i.e. it develops reinforcing material made of lignin. The side walls of a vessel element have pits: more or less circular regions in contact with neighbouring cells. Tracheids also have pits, but only vessel elements have openings at both ends that connect individual vessel elements to form a continuous tubular vessel. These end openings are called perforations or perforation plates. They have a variety of shapes: the most common are the simple perforation (a simple opening) and the scalariform perforation (several elongated openings in a ladder-like design). Other types include the foraminate perforation plate (several round openings) and the reticulate perforation plate (a net-like pattern, with many openings).

At maturity, the protoplast – the living material of the cell – dies and disappears, but the lignified cell walls persist. A vessel element is then a dead cell, but one that still has a function, and is still being protected by surrounding living cells.

== Evolutionary significance ==
The presence of vessels in xylem has been considered to be one of the key innovations that led to the success of the flowering plants. It was once thought that vessel elements were an evolutionary innovation of flowering plants, but their absence from some basal angiosperms and their presence in some members of the Gnetales suggest that this hypothesis must be re-examined; vessel elements in Gnetales may not be homologous with those of angiosperms, or vessel elements that originated in a precursor to the angiosperms may have been subsequently lost in some basal lineages (e.g., Amborellaceae, Trochodendraceae, and Winteraceae), described by Arthur Cronquist as "primitively vesselless". Cronquist considered the vessels of Gnetum to be convergent with those of angiosperms.

Vessel-like cells have also been found in the xylem of Equisetum (horsetails), Selaginella (spike-mosses), Pteridium aquilinum (bracken fern), Marsilea and Regnellidium (aquatic ferns), and the enigmatic fossil group Gigantopteridales. In these cases, it is generally agreed that the vessels evolved independently. It is possible that vessels may have appeared more than once among the angiosperms as well.

== See also ==
- Tracheid

== Further references ==
- Niklas, Karl J. (1997) The Evolutionary Biology of Plants. Chicago and London: The University of Chicago Press. ISBN 0-226-58082-2.
- Schweingruber, F. H. (1990) Anatomie europäischer Hölzer - Anatomy of European woods. Eidgenössische Forschungsanstalt für Wald, Schnee und Landscaft, Birmensdorf (Hrsg.) Haupt, Bern und Stuttgart.
- Timonen, Tuuli (2002). Introduction to Microscopic Wood Identification. Finnish Museum of Natural History, University of Helsinki.
- Wilson, K.; White, D. J. B. (1986). The Anatomy of Wood: Its Diversity and Variability. London: Stobart & Son Ltd. ISBN 0-85442-033-9.
