= Tracheid =

Component of Xylem

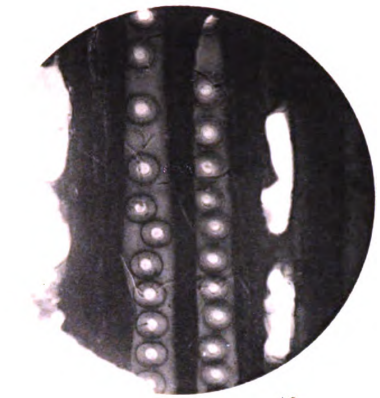
In radial section, two tracheids of a coniferous wood species are shown. A series of bordered pits are also appearing in each tracheid.

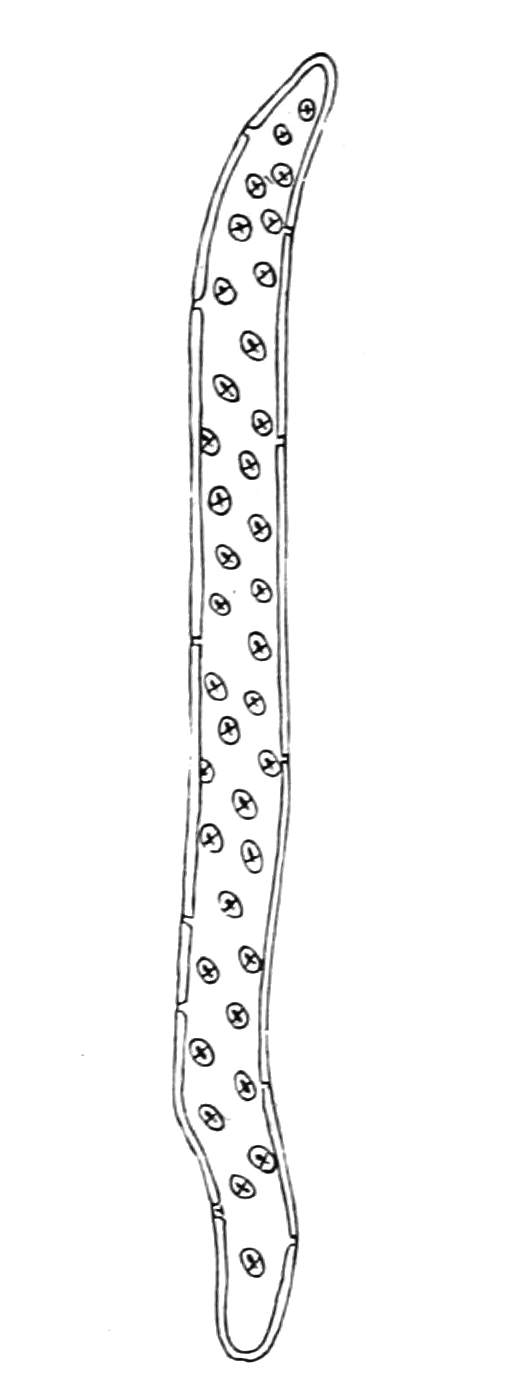
A tracheid of oak shows pits along the walls. It has no perforation plates. Angiosperms have both tracheids and vessel elements.

A tracheid is a long and tapered lignified cell in the xylem of vascular plants. It is a type of conductive cell called a tracheary element. Angiosperms also use another type of conductive cell, called vessel elements, to transport water through the xylem. The main functions of tracheid cells are to transport water and inorganic salts, and to provide structural support for trees. There are often pits on the cell walls of tracheids, which allows for water flow between cells. Tracheids are dead at functional maturity and do not have a protoplast. The wood (softwood) of gymnosperms such as pines and other conifers is mainly composed of tracheids. Tracheids are also the main conductive cells in the primary xylem of ferns.

The tracheid was first named by the German botanist Carl Gustav Sanio in 1863, from the German Tracheide.

== Evolution ==
Tracheids were the main conductive cells found in early vascular plants.

In the first 140–150 million years of vascular plant evolution, tracheids were the only type of conductive cells found in fossils of plant xylem tissues. Ancestral tracheids did not contribute significantly to structural support, as can be seen in extant ferns.

The fossil record shows three different types of tracheid cells found in early plants, which were classified as S-type, G-type and P-type. The first two of them were lignified and had pores to facilitate the transportation of water between cells. The P-type tracheid cells had pits similar to extant plant tracheids. Later, more complex pits appeared, such as bordered pits on many tracheids, which allowed plants to transport water between cells while reducing the risk of cavitation and embolisms in the xylem.

As tracheids evolved along with secondary xylem tissues, specialized inter-tracheid pits appeared. Tracheid length and diameter also increased, with tracheid diameter increasing to an average length of 80 μm by the end of the Devonian period.

Tracheids then evolved into the vessel elements and structural fibers that make up angiosperm wood.
