= Guttation =

Exudations of xylem sap

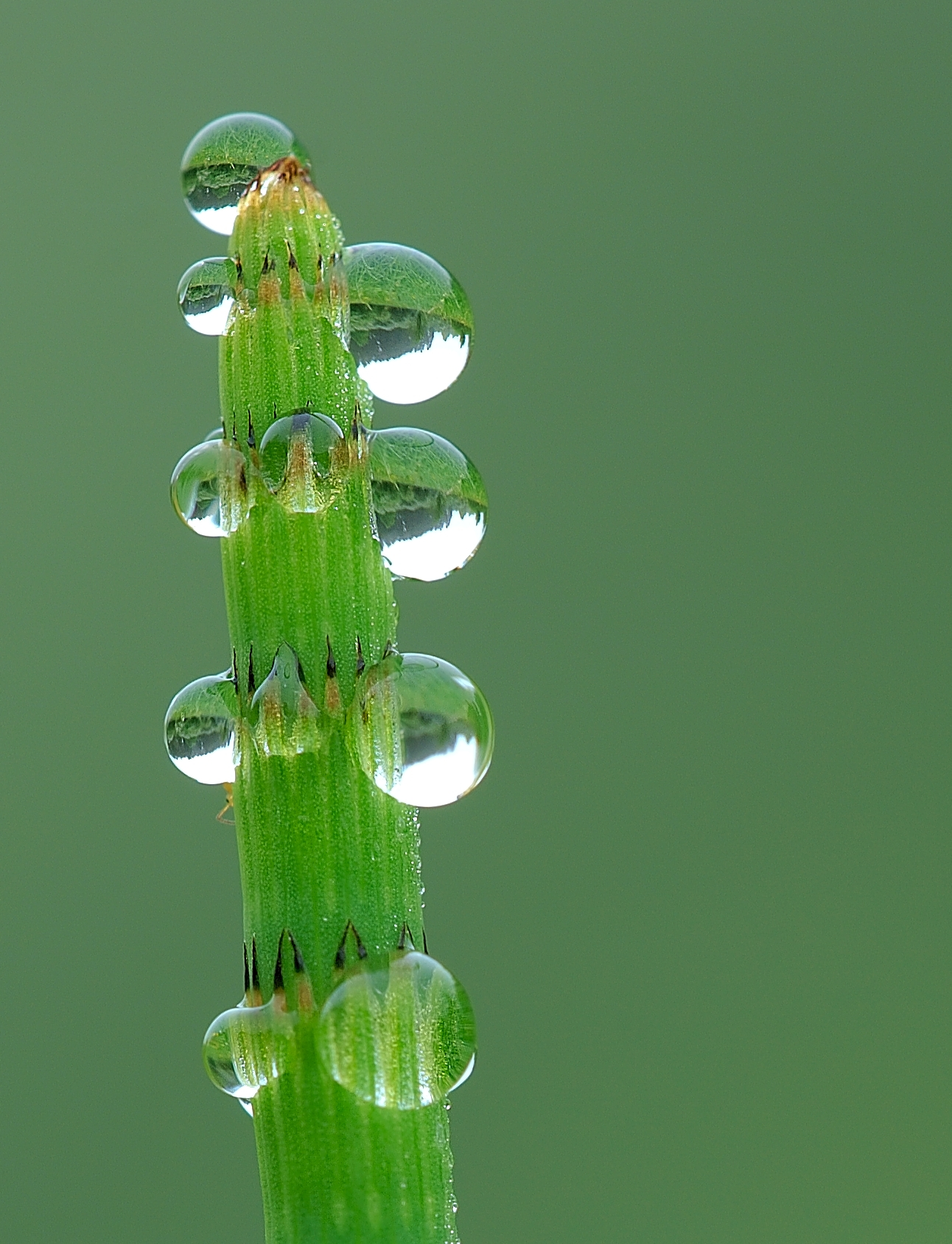
Guttation on Equisetum sp.

Guttation /ɡəteɪʃən/ is the exudation of drops of internal liquid out of the tips or edges of leaves of some vascular plants, and also a number of fungi. Ancient Latin gutta means "a drop of fluid", whence modern botany formed the word guttation to designate that a plant exudes drops of fluid onto the outer surface of the plant, when the source of the fluid is inside the plant. Guttation happens in a variety of plant species.

== Process ==
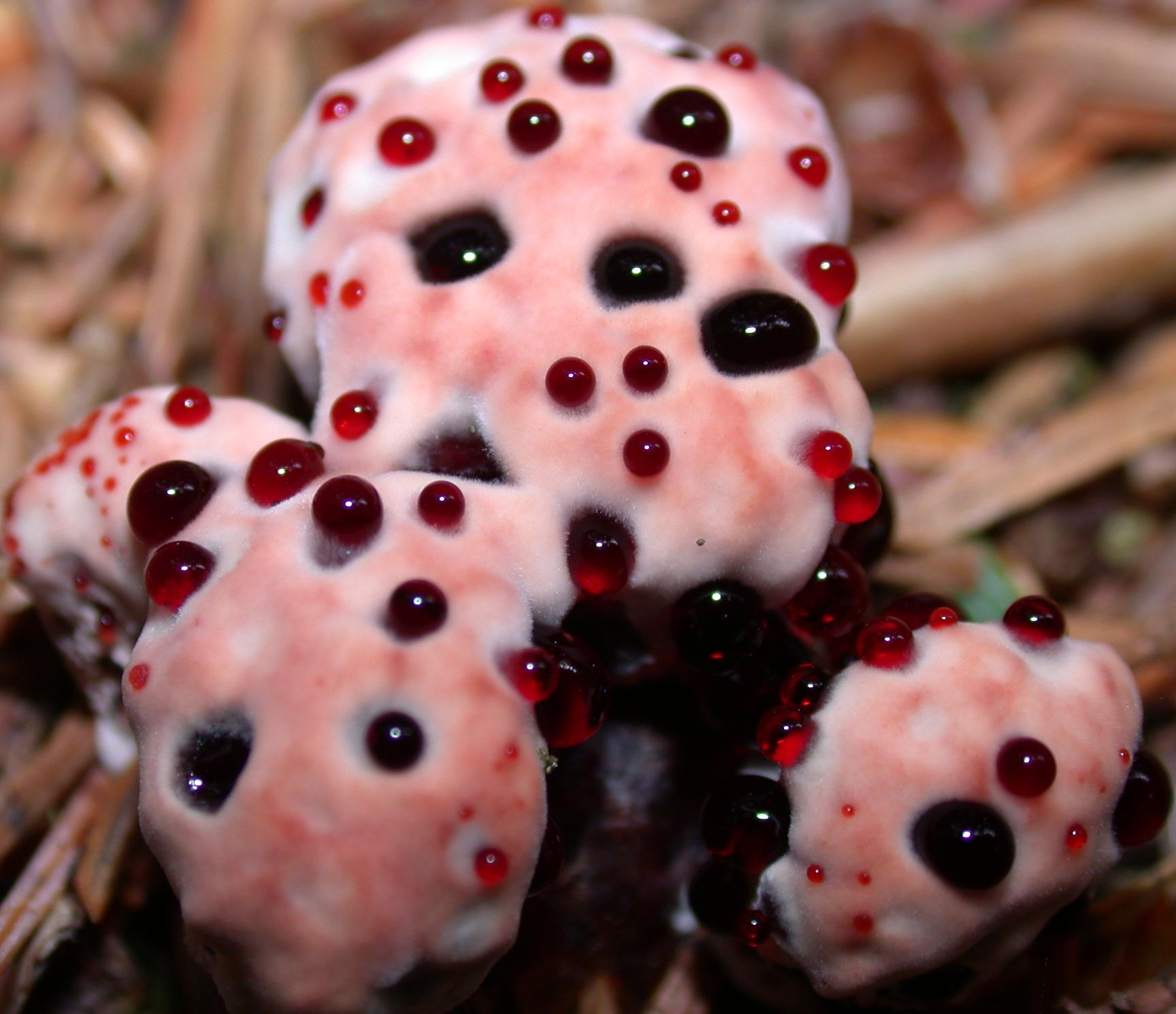
Crimson guttation droplets on the tooth fungus, Hydnellum peckii

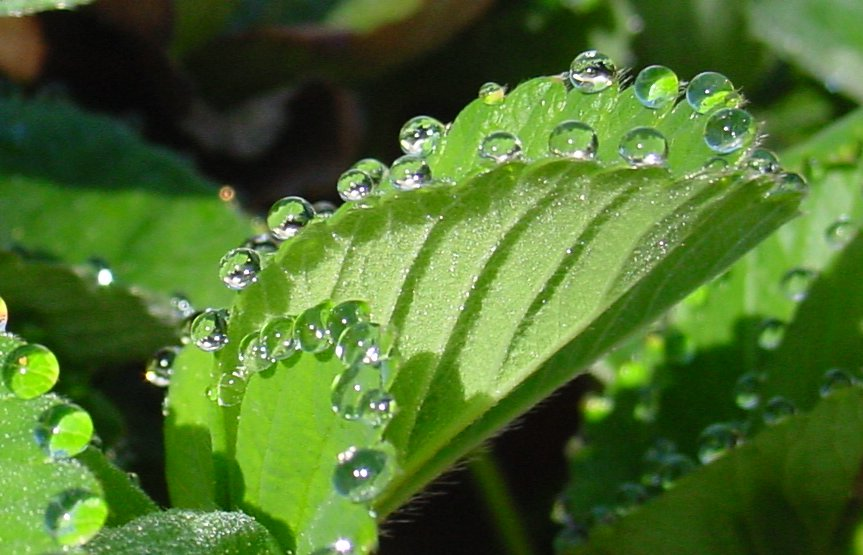
Guttation on a strawberry leaf

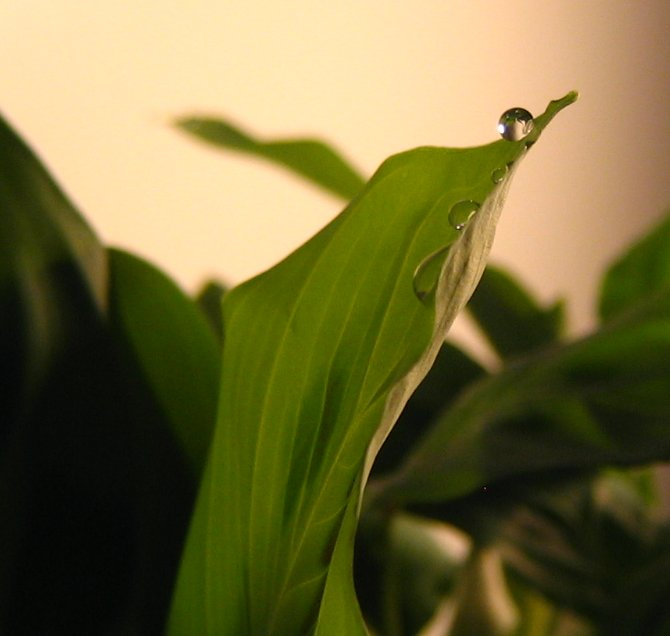
Guttation on a prayer plant

At night, transpiration usually does not occur, because most plants have their stomata closed. When there is a high soil moisture level, water will enter plant roots, because the water potential of the roots is lower than in the soil solution. The water will accumulate in the plant, creating a slight root pressure. The root pressure forces some water to exude through special leaf tip or edge structures called hydathodes or water glands. Root pressure provides the impetus for this flow, rather than transpirational pull. Guttation is most noticeable when transpiration is suppressed and the relative humidity is high, such as during the night.

Guttation formation in fungi is important for visual identification, but the process causing it is unknown. However, due to its association with stages of rapid growth in the life cycle of fungi, it has been hypothesized that during rapid growth periods excess water produced by accelerated respiration is exuded.

== Chemical content ==
Guttation fluid may contain a variety of organic and inorganic compounds, mainly sugars, and potassium. On drying, a white crust remains on the leaf surface.

Girolami et al. (2009) found that guttation drops from corn plants germinated from neonicotinoid-coated seeds could contain amounts of insecticide consistently higher than 10 mg/L, and up to 200 mg/L for the neonicotinoid imidacloprid. Concentrations this high are near those of active ingredients applied in field sprays for pest control and sometimes even higher. It was found that when bees consume guttation drops collected from plants grown from neonicotinoid-coated seeds, they die within a few minutes.

=== Nitrogen levels ===
If high levels of nitrogen appear in the fluid, it is a sign of fertilizer burn.

== Nutrition ==
Guttation droplets are consumed by numerous insects of different orders, and is an important and highly reliable source of essential carbohydrates and proteins. Unlike nectar, guttation droplets are present in an ecosystem during the entire growing season.

== See also ==
- Homeostasis
- Osmosis
- Soil plant atmosphere continuum
