= Softwood =

Wood from gymnosperm trees such as conifers

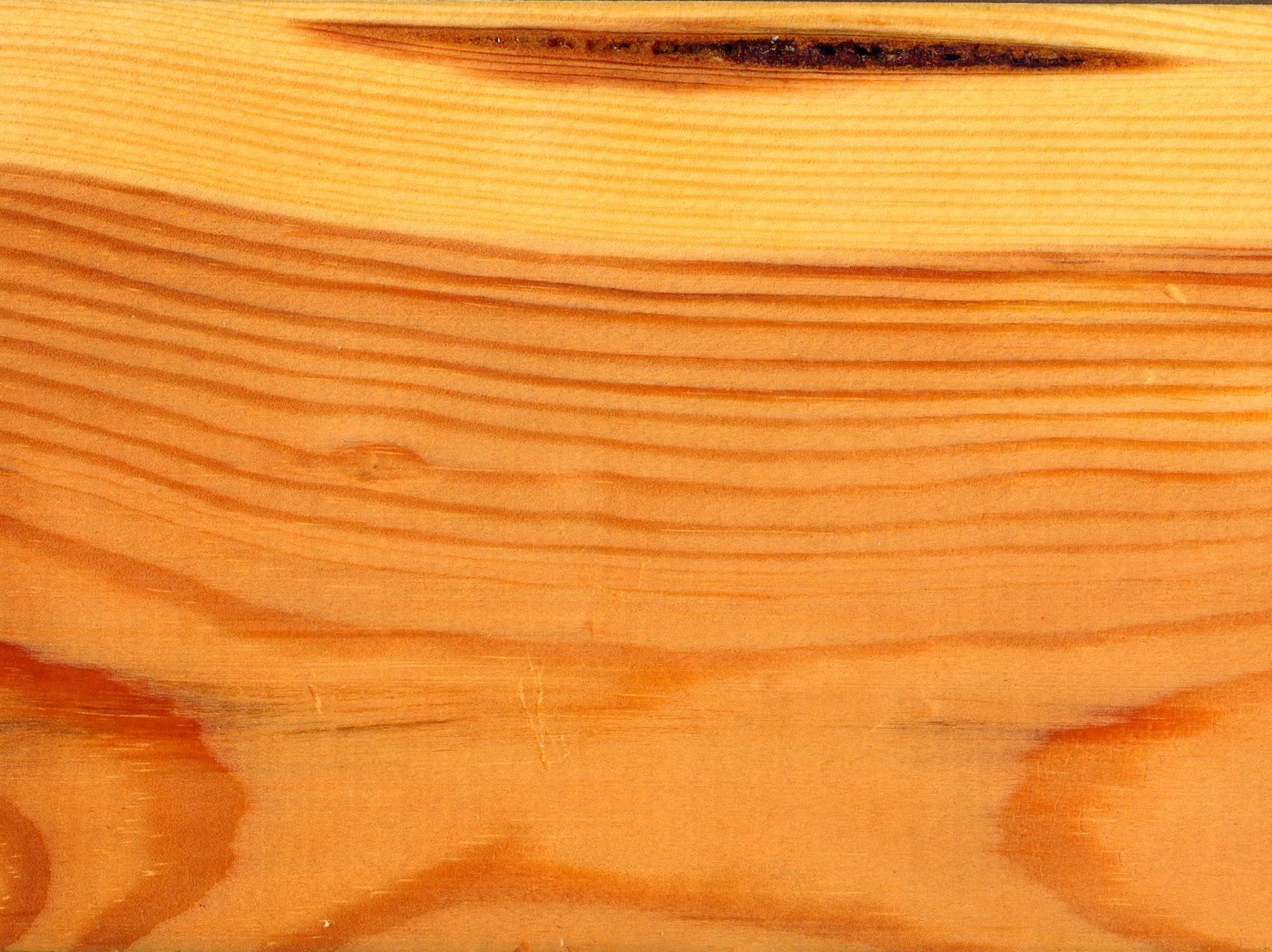
Scots pine, a typical and well-known softwood

Softwood is wood from gymnosperm trees such as conifers. The term is opposed to hardwood, which is the wood from angiosperm trees. The main difference between hardwoods and softwoods is that softwoods completely lack vessels (pores). The main softwood species (pines, spruces, larches, false tsugas) also have resin canals (or ducts) in their wood.

== Characteristics ==
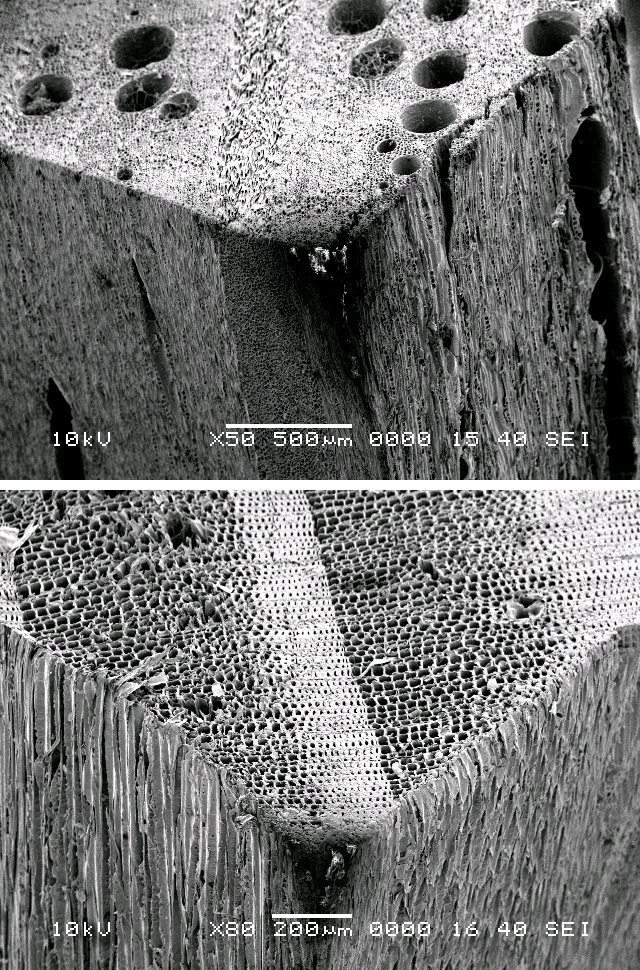
SEM images showing the presence of pores in hardwoods (oak, top) and absence in softwoods (pine, bottom)

Softwood is wood from gymnosperm trees such as pines and spruces. Softwoods are not necessarily softer than hardwoods. The hardest hardwoods are much harder than any softwood, but in both groups there is enormous variation with the range of wood hardness of the two groups overlapping. For example, balsa wood, which is a hardwood, is softer than most softwoods, whereas the longleaf pine, Douglas fir, and yew softwoods are much harder than several hardwoods.

Several specific natural, macroscopic and microscopic features of wood are used in the identification process of a softwood species.

Softwoods are generally most used by the construction industry and are also used to produce paper pulp, and card products. In many of these applications, there is a constant need for density and thickness monitoring and gamma-ray sensors have shown good performance in this case.

Certain species of softwood are more resistant to insect attack from woodworm, as certain insects prefer damp hardwood.

== Examples of softwood trees and uses ==
- Douglas fir - joinery, doors and heavy construction
- Eastern white pine - furniture
- European spruce - used throughout construction, panelling and cladding
- Larch - cladding and boats
- Lodgepole pine - roofing, flooring and in making chipboard and particle board
- Monterey pine
- Parana pine - stair treads and joinery (critically endangered)
- Scots pine - construction industry, mostly for interior work
- Sitka spruce
- Southern yellow pine - joinery, flooring and decking
- Western hemlock - doors, joinery and furniture
- Western red cedar (or red cedar) - furniture, decking, cladding, and roof shingles
- Yew- to make long bows and tool handles.

== Applications ==
Softwood is the source of about 70% of the world's annual production of lumber, with traditional centers of production being mainly the US and Canada, Russia, China, Germany, and Scandinavia. Softwood is typically used in construction as structural carcassing timber, as well as finishing timber.

== See also ==
- List of woods
- United States – Canada softwood lumber dispute
- Hardwood
- Janka hardness test
- Brinell scale
