= Pit (botany) =

Feature of plant cell walls

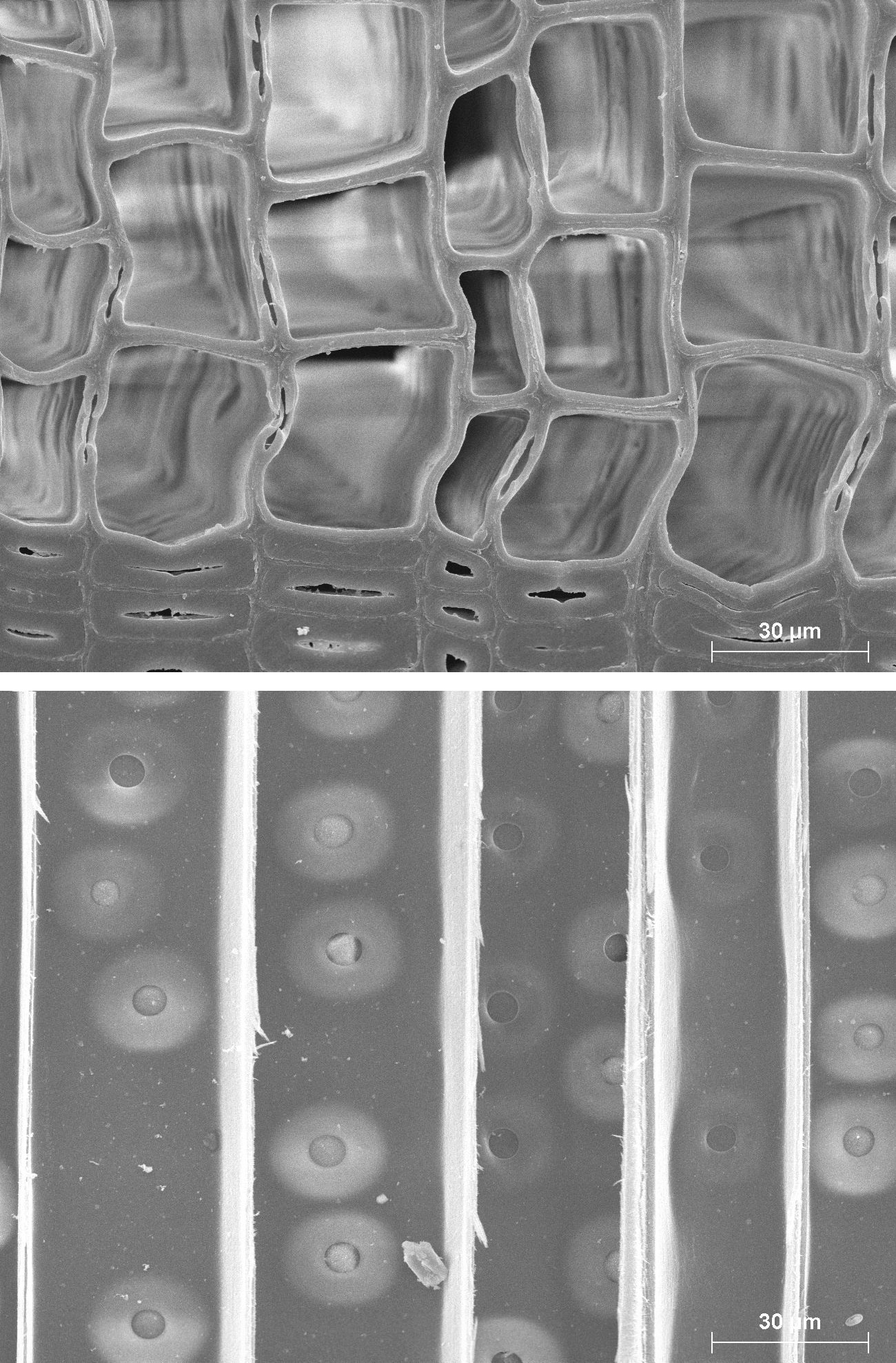
Bordered pits in the wood of Picea abies. The top section is a cross-sectional view with bordered pits shown between adjacent cells, and the bottom section is a radial view with numerous bordered pits shown.

Pits in botany are relatively thinner portions of the cell wall that adjacent cells can communicate or exchange fluid through. Pits are characteristic of cell walls with secondary layers. Generally each pit has a complementary pit opposite of it in the neighboring cell. These complementary pits are called "pit pairs".

Pits are composed of three parts: the pit chamber, the pit aperture, and the pit membrane. The pit chamber is the hollow area where the secondary layers of the cell wall are absent. The pit aperture is the opening at either end of the pit chamber. The pit membrane is the primary cell wall and middle lamella, or the membrane between adjacent cell walls, at the middle of the pit chamber.

The primary cell wall at the pit membrane may also have depressions similar to the pit depressions of the secondary layers. These depressions are primary pit-fields, or primary pits. In the primary pit, the primordial pit provides an interruption in the primary cell wall that the plasmodesmata can cross. The primordial pit is the only aperture in the otherwise continuous primary cell wall.

Pit pairs are a characteristic feature of xylem, as sap flows through the pits of xylem cells.

== Types of pits ==
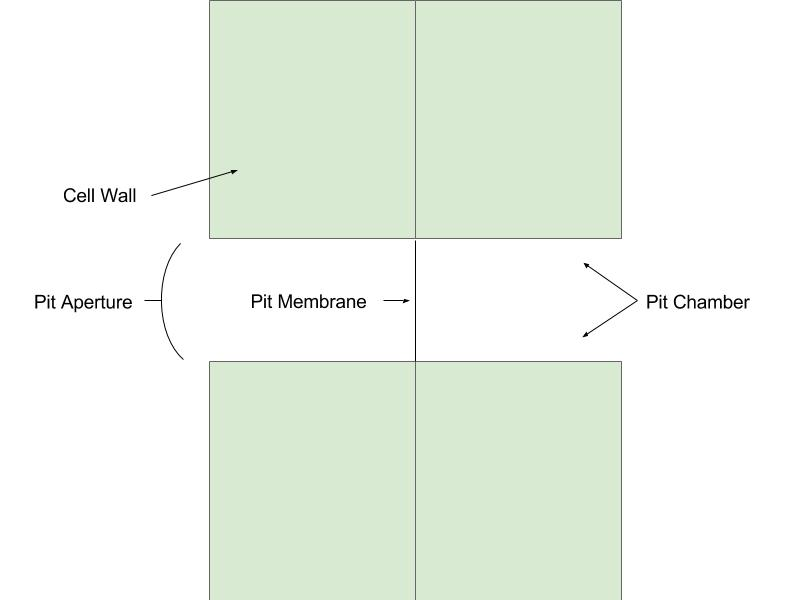
A simplified diagram of a simple pit pair

Though pits are usually simple and complementary, a few more pit variations can be formed:

- Simple pits: A pit pair in which the diameter of the pit chamber and the diameter of the pit aperture are equal.
- Bordered pits: A pit pair in which the pit chamber is over-arched by the cell wall, creating a larger pit chamber and smaller pit aperture.
- Half bordered pits: A pit pair in which a bordered pit has a complementary simple pit. Such a pit pair is called half bordered pit pair.
- Blind pits: A pit pair in which a simple pit has no complementary pit.
- Compound pits: A pit pair in which one cell wall has a large pit and the adjacent cell wall has numerous small pits.

== Plasmodesmata ==
Plasmodesmata are thin sections of the endoplasmic reticulum that traverse pits and connect adjacent cells. These sections provide an avenue of transport through the pits and facilitate communication. Plasmodesmata are not restricted to pits however, as plasmodesmata often cross a cell wall of constant width and occasionally the cell wall is even wider in areas where plasmodesmata traverse it.

== Torus and margo ==
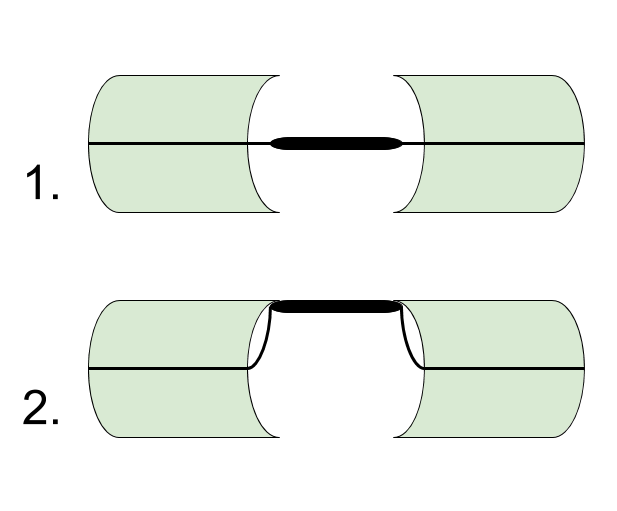
A simplified diagram of a bordered pit-pair with a torus and margo. The top shows an unobstructed pit and the bottom shows an aspirated pit, with the margo flexing under stress.

The torus and margo are characteristic features of bordered pit-pairs in gymnosperms, such as Coniferales, Ginkgo, and Gnetales. In other vascular plants, the torus is rare. The pit membrane is separated into two parts: a thick impermeable torus at the center of the pit membrane, and the permeable margo surrounding it. The torus regulates the functions of the bordered pit, and the margo is a cell wall-derived porous membrane that supports the torus. The margo is composed of bundles of microfibrils that radiate from the torus.

The margo is flexible and can move towards either side of the pit while under stress. This allows the thick, impermeable torus to block the pit aperture. When the torus is displaced so that it blocks the pit aperture, the pit is said to be aspirated.
