= Xyloglucan =

Structural polysaccharide in the primary cell walls of land plants

Xyloglucan is a hemicellulose that occurs in the primary cell wall of all vascular plants; however, all enzymes responsible for xyloglucan metabolism are found in Charophyceae algae. In many dicotyledonous plants, it is the most abundant hemicellulose in the primary cell wall. Xyloglucan binds to the surface of cellulose microfibrils and may link them together. It is the substrate of xyloglucan endotransglycosylase, which cuts and ligates xyloglucans, as a means of integrating new xyloglucans into the cell wall. It is also thought to be the substrate of alpha-expansin, which promotes cell wall enlargement.

== Chemistry ==
Xyloglucan has a backbone of β1→4-linked glucose residues, most of which are substituted with 1-6 linked xylose sidechains. The xylose residues are often capped with a galactose residue sometimes followed by a fucose residue. The specific structure of xyloglucan differs between plant families.

== Biosynthesis ==
Xyloglucan is synthesized in Golgi trans cisternae and in the trans Golgi network (TGN) and is transported to the cell membrane by vesicles, where it is expelled and adsorbs on nascent cellulosic microfibrils.

== Metabolism in the human gut ==
The human genome doesn't contain the genes coding for xyloglucan degradation even though xyloglucans are an important component of most human diets. Recent studies have shown that a discrete genetic locus confers xyloglucan metabolism in selected human gut Bacteroidota. This findings reveals that the metabolism of even highly abundant components of dietary fiber maybe mediated by niche species. The metabolism of xyloglucans is the result of the concerted action of several enzymes and membrane transporters. However, given the high diversity of composition of xyloglucans from different plant sources, there is a keystone enzyme, an endo-xyloglucanase called BoGH5A, that has the ability to cleave a range of xyloglucans to generate short xyloglucans ready for uptake. A detailed analysis of the structure and function of the enzyme has revealed the presence of a domain called the BACON domain whose primary function in BoGH5A may be to distance the catalytic module from the cell surface and confer additional mobility to the catalytic domain to attack the polysaccharide. A broad active-site cleft engendering binding plasticity is the key feature allowing BoGH5A which allows it to accommodate a wide range of natural XyGs.

The prevalence of XyGs in the human diet suggests that the mechanism by which bacteria degrade these complex polysaccharides is highly important to human energy acquisition. Moreover, the rarity of XyG metabolism highlights the significance of Bacteroides ovatus and other proficient XyG-degrading Bacteroidota as key members of the human gut microbial consortium.
