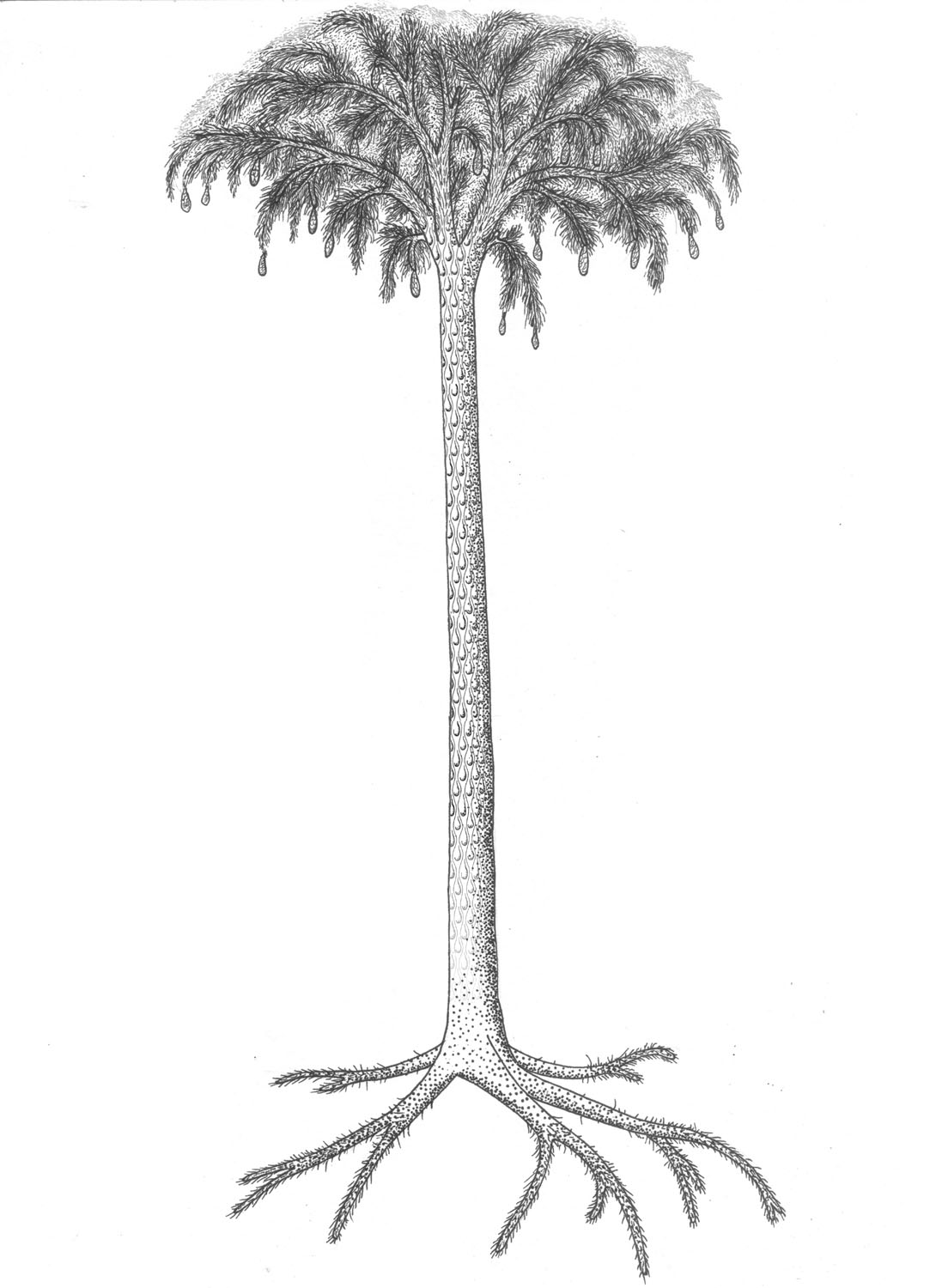
- Life reconstruction

Scientific classification
- Kingdom: Plantae
- Clade: Tracheophytes
- Clade: Lycophytes
- Class: Lycopodiopsida
- Order: †Lepidodendrales
- Family: †Lepidodendraceae
- Genus: †Lepidodendron; Sternberg, 1820

Species
- L. aculeatum Sternberg 1820; L. batovii Chachlov 1948; L. obovatum Sternberg 1820; L. whitehillianum Anderson & Anderson 1986

Synonyms
- Dimicheleodendron B.A.Thomas & C.J.Cleal

= Lepidodendron =

Lepidodendron Temporal range: Early Carboniferous–Late Permian

Extinct genus of vascular plants

Lepidodendron, from Ancient Greek λεπίς (lepís), meaning "scale", and δένδρον (déndron), meaning "tree", is an extinct genus of primitive lycopodian vascular plants belonging to the order Lepidodendrales (also called "arborescent lycophytes"). Like other Lepidodendrales, species of Lepidodendron grew as large-tree-like plants in wetland coal forest environments. They sometimes reached heights of 50 metres (160 feet), and the trunks were often over 1 m (3 ft 3 in) in diameter. They are often known as "scale trees", due to their bark having been covered in diamond-shaped leaf-bases, from which the needle-like leaves grew during earlier stages of growth. They thrived during the Carboniferous Period (358.9 to 298.9 million years ago), and persisted until the end of the Permian around 252 million years ago (though Permian remains may be better assigned to other lepiodendralean genera). Sometimes erroneously called "giant club mosses", Lepidodendron was actually more closely related to modern quillworts than to modern club mosses. In the form classification system used in paleobotany, Lepidodendron is both used for the whole plant as well as specifically the stems and leaves.

== Description and biology ==
=== Overview ===
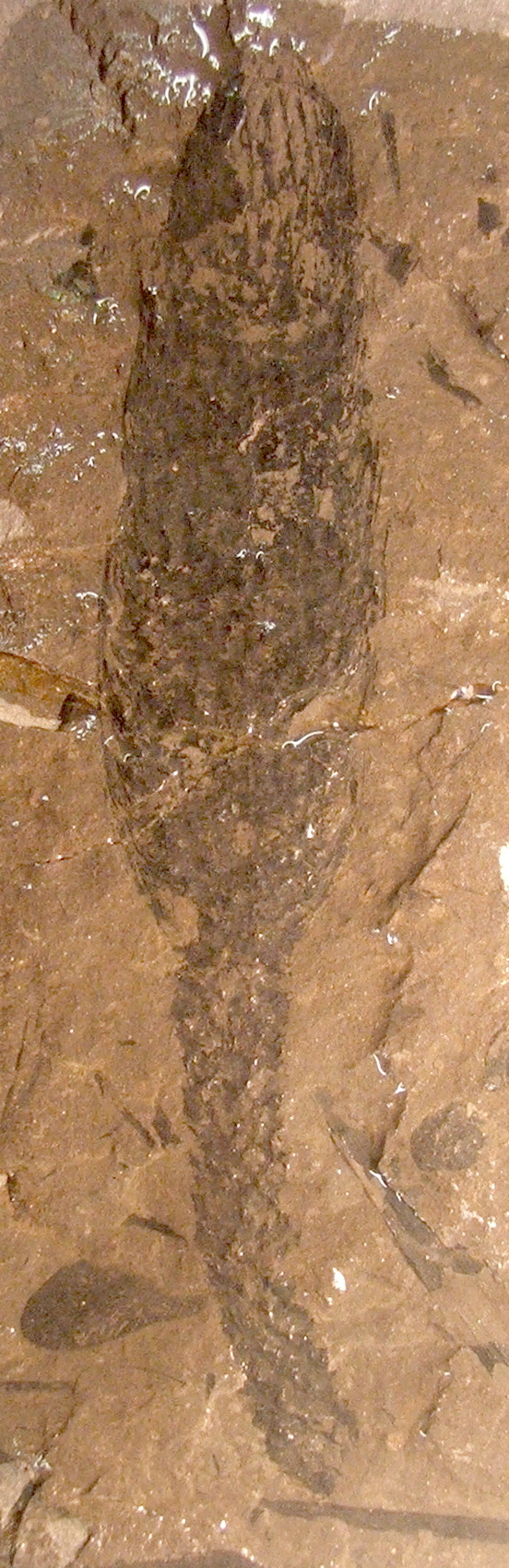
Lepidostrobus, the strobilus of Lepidodendron lycophytes

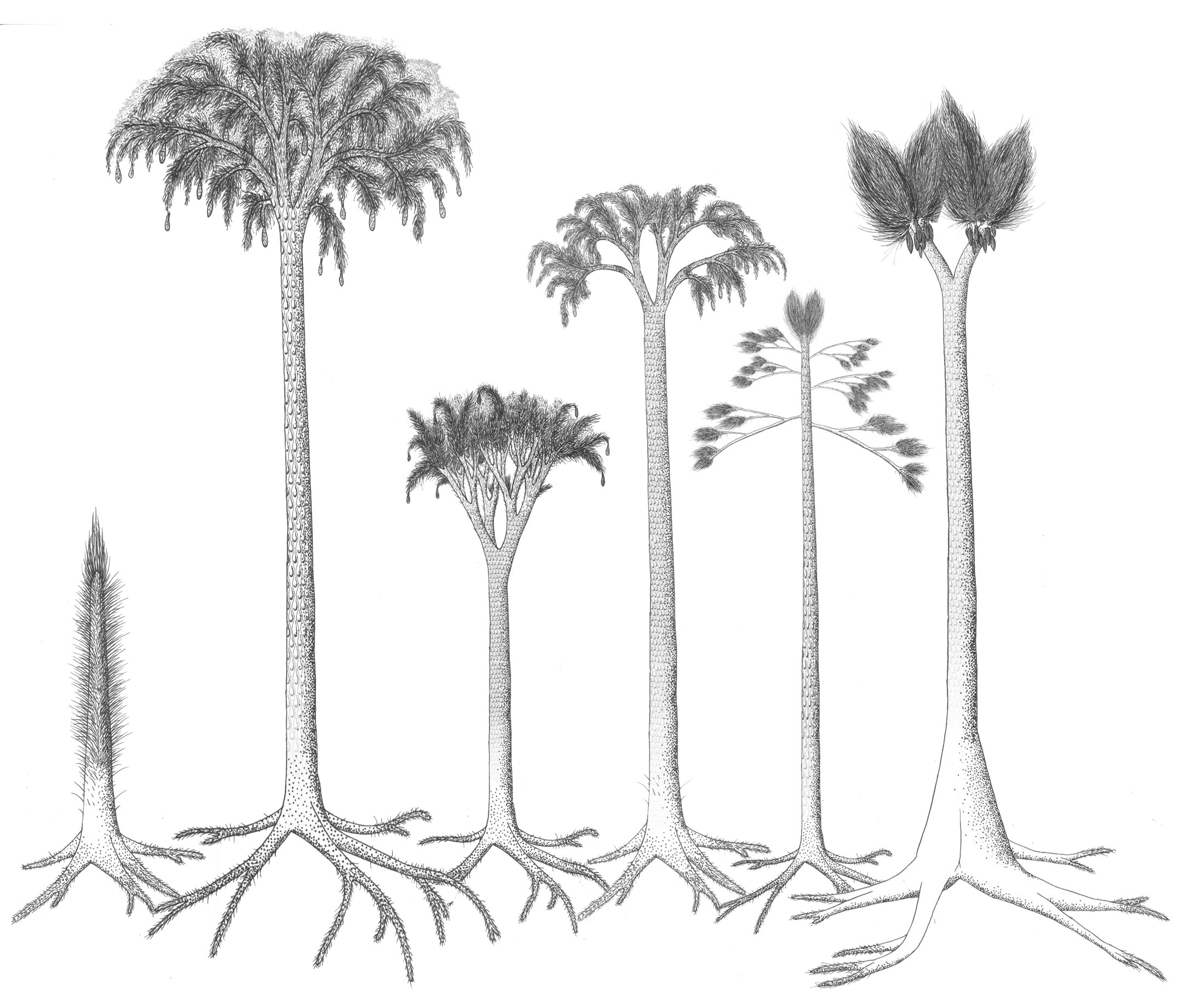
Reconstruction of Lepidodendron (second from left) compared to a juvenile scale tree (far left) and other Lepidodendrales, which from left to right include Lepidophloios, Synchysidendron, Diaphorodendron and Sigillaria.

Lepidodendron species were comparable in size to modern trees. The plants had tapering trunks as wide as 2 m (6.6 ft) at their base that rose to about 40 m (130 ft) and even 50 m (160 ft), arising from an underground system of horizontally spreading branches that were covered with many rootlets. Though the height of the lycopsids make the plants similar to modern trees, the constant dichotomy of branches created a habit that contrasts with that of modern trees. At the ends of branches were oval-shaped strobili called Lepidostrobus that had a similar shape to modern cones of a spruce or fir.

=== Stem ===
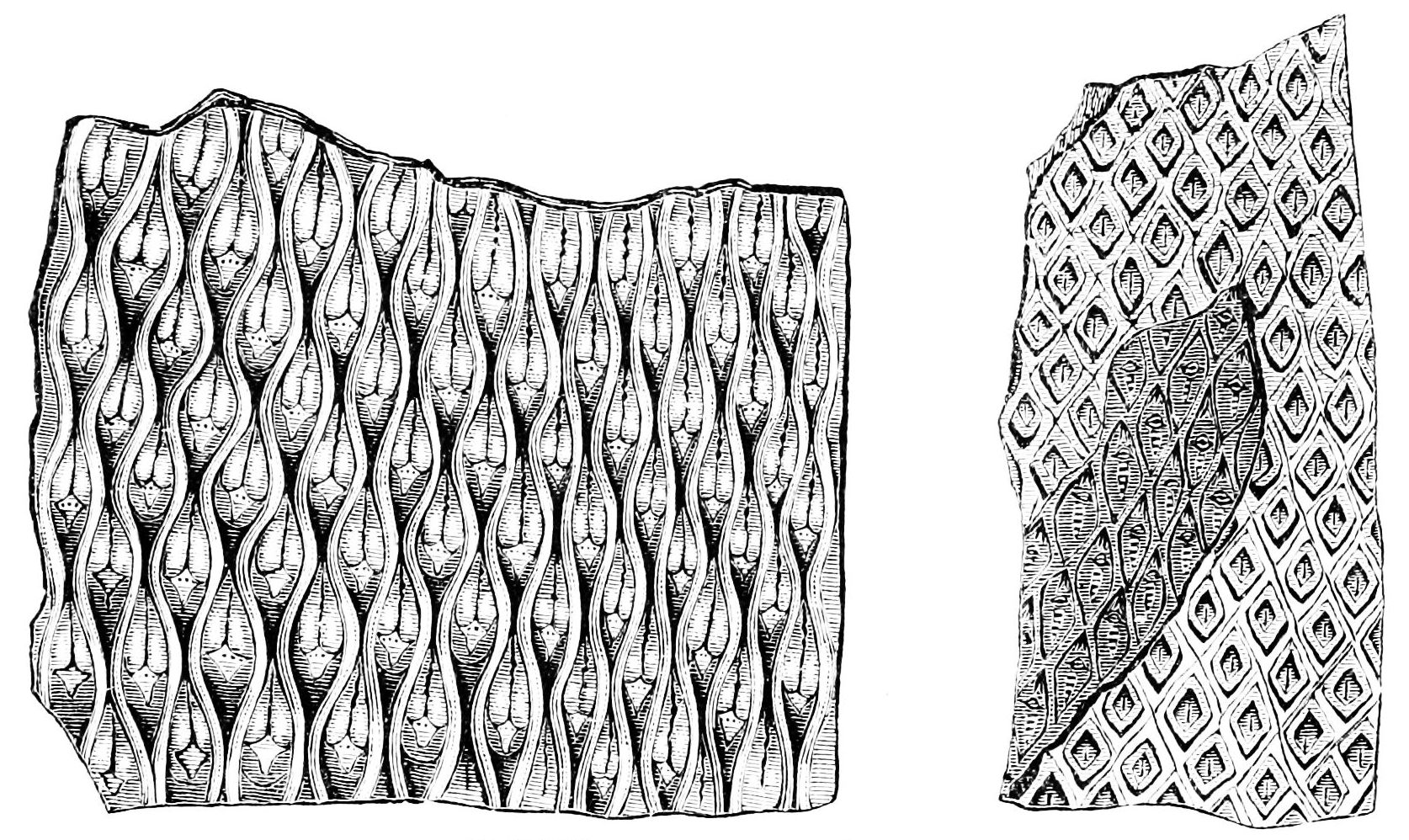
Leaf scars shown on a Lepidodendron. The "diamond shape" or scale impressions are common indicators of the leaf scars from Lepidodendron lycophytes.

The stem of the lycopsids had a unifacial vascular cambium, contrasting with the bifacial vascular cambium of modern trees. Though the bifacial cambium of modern trees produces both secondary phloem and xylem, the unifacial cambium of Lepidodendron lycopsid produced only secondary xylem. As the lycopods aged, the wood produced by the unifacial cambium decreased towards the top of the plant such that terminal twigs resembled young Lepidodendron stems. Compared to modern trees, the stems and branches of the lycopsids contained little wood with the majority of mature stems consisting of a massive cortical meristem. The nearly-uniform growth of this cortical tissue indicates no difference in growth during changing seasons, and the absence of dormant buds further indicates the lack of seasonality in Lepidodendron species. The outermost cortex of oldest stems developed into the bark-like lycopodiopsid periderm. The bark of the lycopsid was somewhat similar to that of Picea species, as leaf scars formed peg-like projections that stretched and tore as the bark stretched. To resist the bending force of wind, Lepidodendron depended on their outer bark rather than their vascular tissues, as compared to modern trees that rely mostly on their central mass of wood.

=== Leaves ===
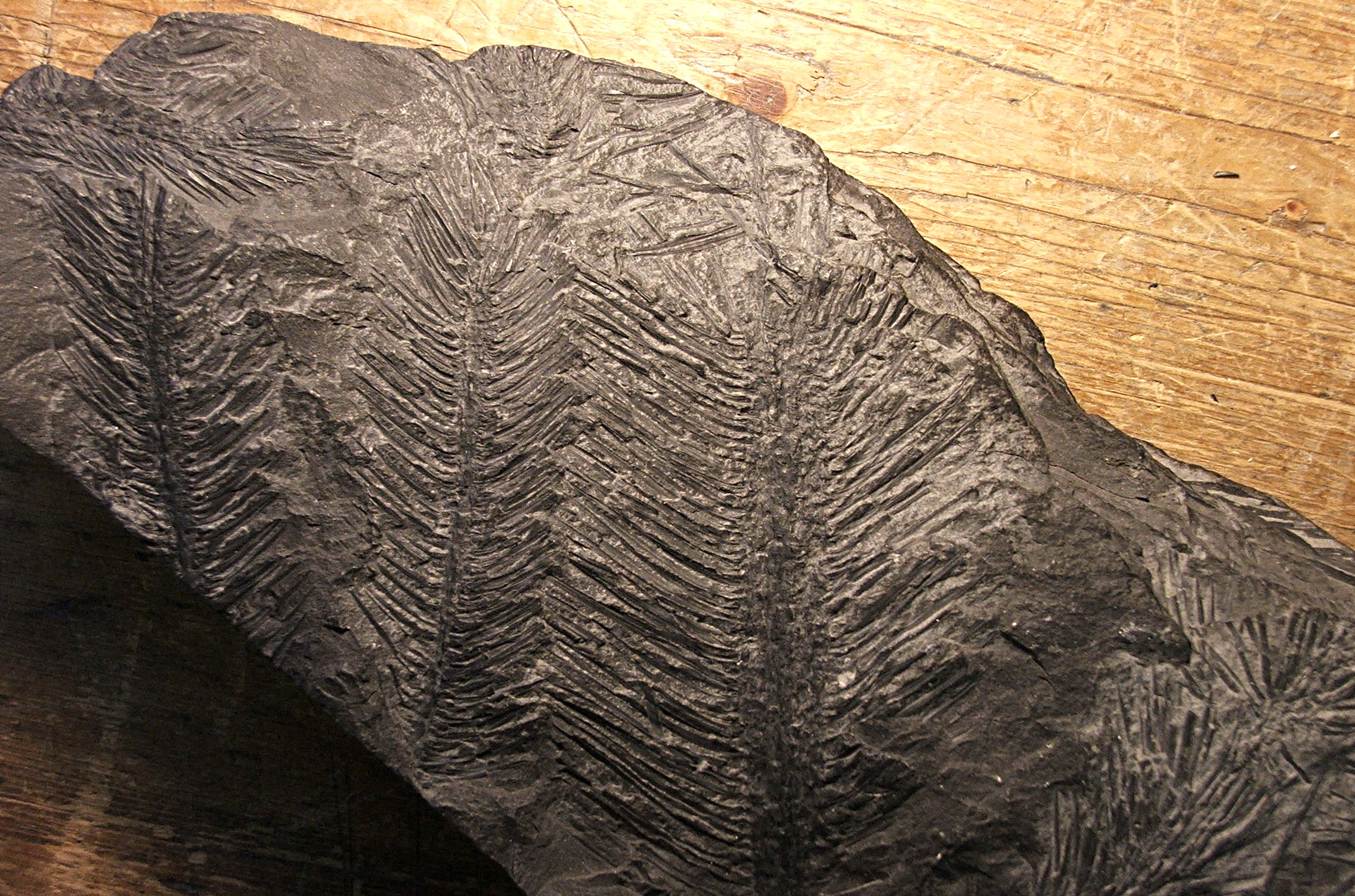
Leaf of Lepidodendron

The leaves of the lycopsid were needle-like and were densely spiraled about young shoots, each possessing only a single vein. The leaves were similar to those of a fir in some species and similar to those of Pinus roxburghii in others, though in general the leaves of Lepidodendron species are indistinguishable from those of Sigillaria species. The decurrent leaves formed a cylindrical shell around branches. The leaves were only present on thin and young branches, indicating that, though the lycopsid were evergreen, they did not retain their needles for as long as modern conifers. The leaf-cushions were fusiform and elongated, growing at most to a length of 8 cm (3 in) and a width of 2 cm (3/4 in). The middle of leaf-cushions were smooth, where leaf scars were created when an abscission layer cut a leaf from its base. Each leaf scar was composed of a central circular or triangular scar and two lateral scars that were smaller and oval-shaped. This central scar marks where the main vascular bundle of the leaf connected to the vascular system of the stem. This xylem bundle was composed only of primary trachea. The two outer scars mark the forked branches of a strand of vascular tissue that passed from the cortex of the stem into the leaf. This forked strand is sometimes referred to as the "parichnos". Surrounding this strand were parenchyma cells and occasionally thick-walled elements. Surrounding both conducting tissues was a broad sheath of transfusion tracheids. Below the leaf scar the leaf-cushion tapered to a basal position. In this tapering area, circular impressions with fine pits were present. These impressions were continuous with the parichnos scars near the top of the tapering portion. This is because the impressions are formed by aerenchyma tissue that developed in closely with the parichnos. Above the leaf scar was a deep triangular impression known as the "ligular pit" for its similarities to the ligule of Isoetes. In some leaf-cushions a second depression was present above the ligular pit. Though its purpose is unclear, it has been suggested that the depression may mark the position of a sporangium. As the branch of a Lepidodendron lycopsid grew the leaf-cushion only grew to a certain extent, past which the leaf-cushion stretched. This stretching widened the groove that separated the leaf-cushions, creating a broad, flat channel.

=== Underground structures ===
The underground structures of Lepidodendron and similar lycopsid species known from the fossil record including Sigillaria are assigned to the form taxon, Stigmaria. The rootlets were dichotomously branched from the rhizomes similar to Isoetes. These rhizomorphic axes were shoot-like, and dichotomous branching of the rootlets structured the stigmarian systems. Rootlet scars can be seen from Stigmaria fossils where the root hairs used to be attached. Hyphae are occasionally present in the tissues of Lepidodendron lycopsids, indicating the presence of mycorrhizal associations.

=== Decay ===
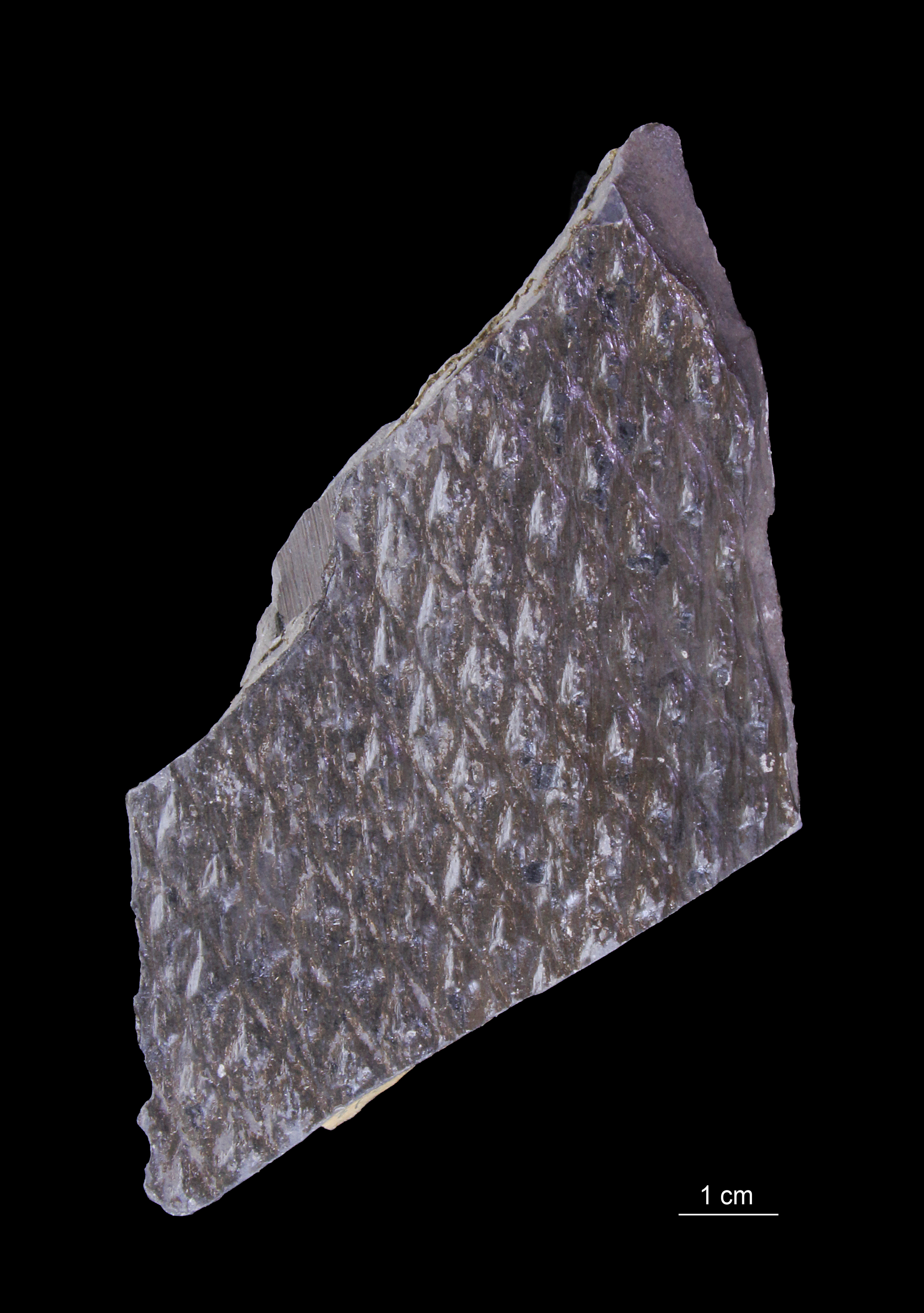
Lepidodendron sp. bark from the Estonian Museum of Natural History.

Different fossil genera have been described to name the various levels of decay in Lepidodendron bark fossils. The name Bergeria describes stems that have lost their epidermises, Aspidiaria is used when cushions have been removed by deep decay, and Knorria is used when the leaf cushions and the majority of cortical tissues has decayed, with a shallow "fluted" surface remaining. However, it has been suggested that these are more likely growth forms than preserved bark types, as entire fossilized trunks have been discovered with dissimilar forms; if decay is assumed to be constant throughout the trunk, then different forms indicate growth rather than levels of decay. It is likely that the trunk of Lepidodendron lycopsids were subject to the growth forms Knorria, Aspidiaria, and Bergeria progressing up the trunk, respectively.

== Growth and reproduction ==
External image
- Painting of lepidodendralean trees at various stages of growth by Annette Townsend

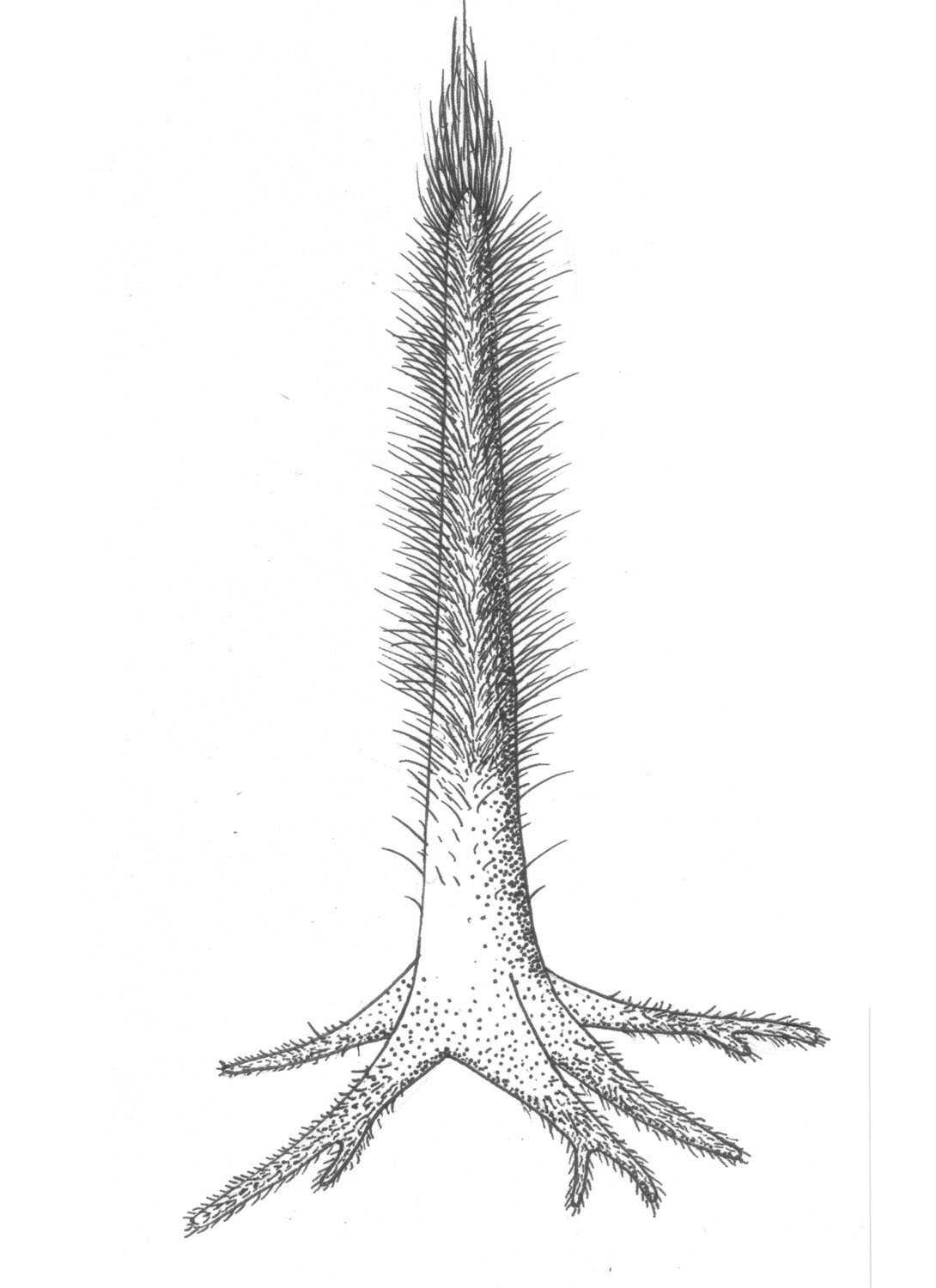
Reconstruction of a juvenile Lepidodendron, showing the unbranched trunk with leaves

During the early stages of growth, Lepidodendron grew as single, unbranched trunk, with leaves growing out of the scale leaf bases (cushions). Towards the end of the lycopod growth, the leaves on the lower part of the trunk were shed, and in Lepidodendron, the upper part of the trunk dichotomously branched into a crown. The rate of growth of arborescent lycophytes is disputed, some authors contended that they had a rapid life cycle, growing to their maximum size and dying in only 10 to 15 years, while other authors argue that these growth rates were overestimated. Rather than reproduce with seeds, Lepidodendron lycopsids reproduced with spores. The spores were stored in sporangia situated on fertile stems that grew on or near the main trunk. The fertile stems grew together in cone-like structures that clustered at the tips of branches.

== Distribution ==
The lack of growth rings and dormant buds indicates no seasonal growth patterns, and modern plants with similar characteristics tend to grow in tropical conditions. However, Lepidodendron species were distributed throughout subtropical regions. The lycopsid inhabited an extensive area compared to tropical flora of the same time period, with lycopods growing as far north as Spitsbergen and as far south as South America, in a latitudinal range of 120°.

== Extinction ==
In Euramerica, Lepidodendron became extinct at the end of the Carboniferous, as part of a broader pattern of ecological change, including the increasing dominance of seed plants in lowland wetland forests, and increasingly arid-adapted vegetation across western Pangea. However, in the Cathaysia region comprising what is now China, wet tropical environmental conditions continued to prevail, with Lepidodendron (in its broad sense) only becoming extinct around the end of the Permian, around 252 million years ago, as a result of the extreme environmental disturbance caused by the Permian-Triassic extinction event, though by end of the Permian arborescent lycophytes were marginal and rare elements of Cathaysian ecosystems.

== Gallery ==
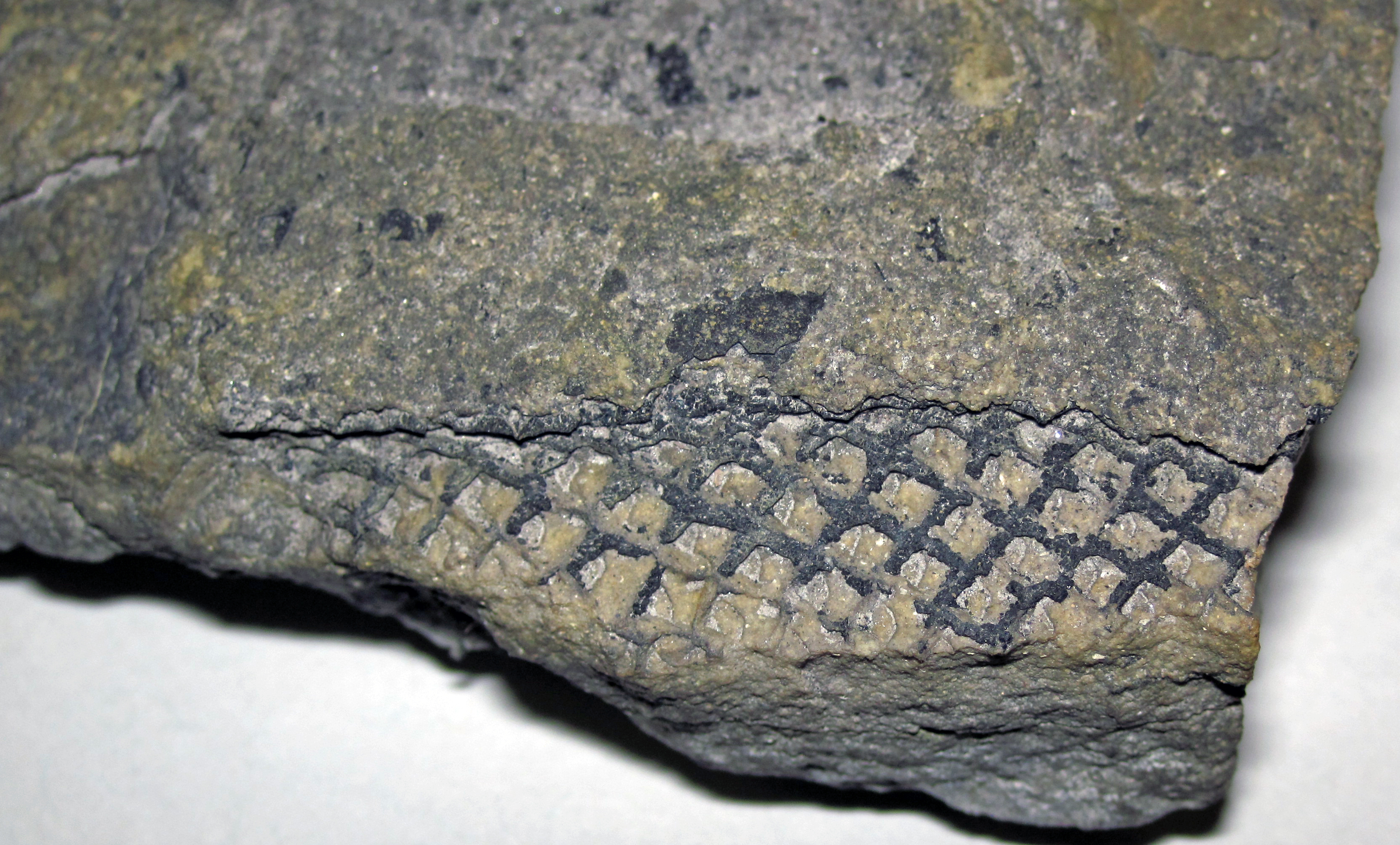
Lepidodendron sp. bark from the Pottsville Group, Lower Pennsylvanian

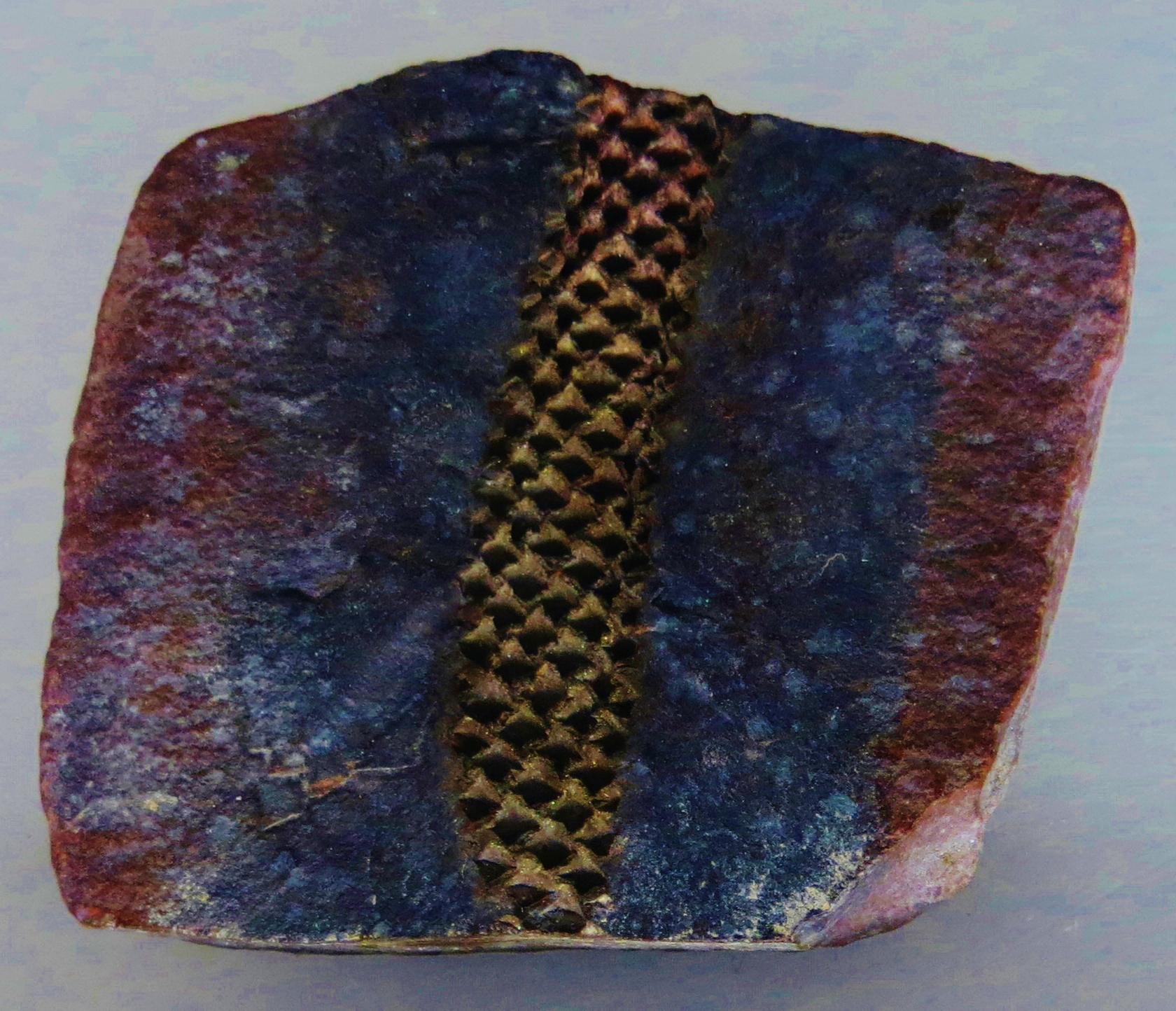
Lepidodendron elegans

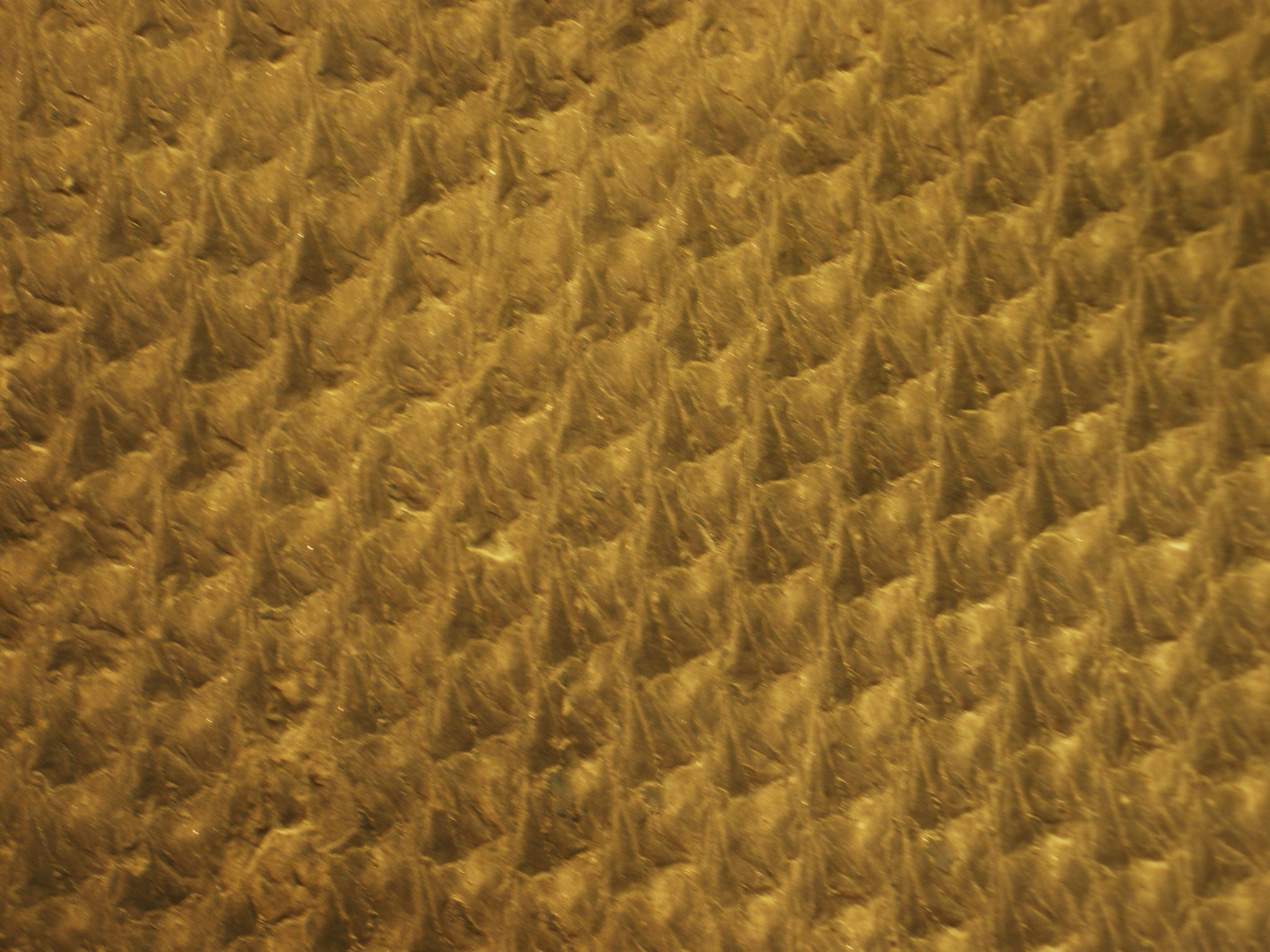
Lepidodendron aculeatum

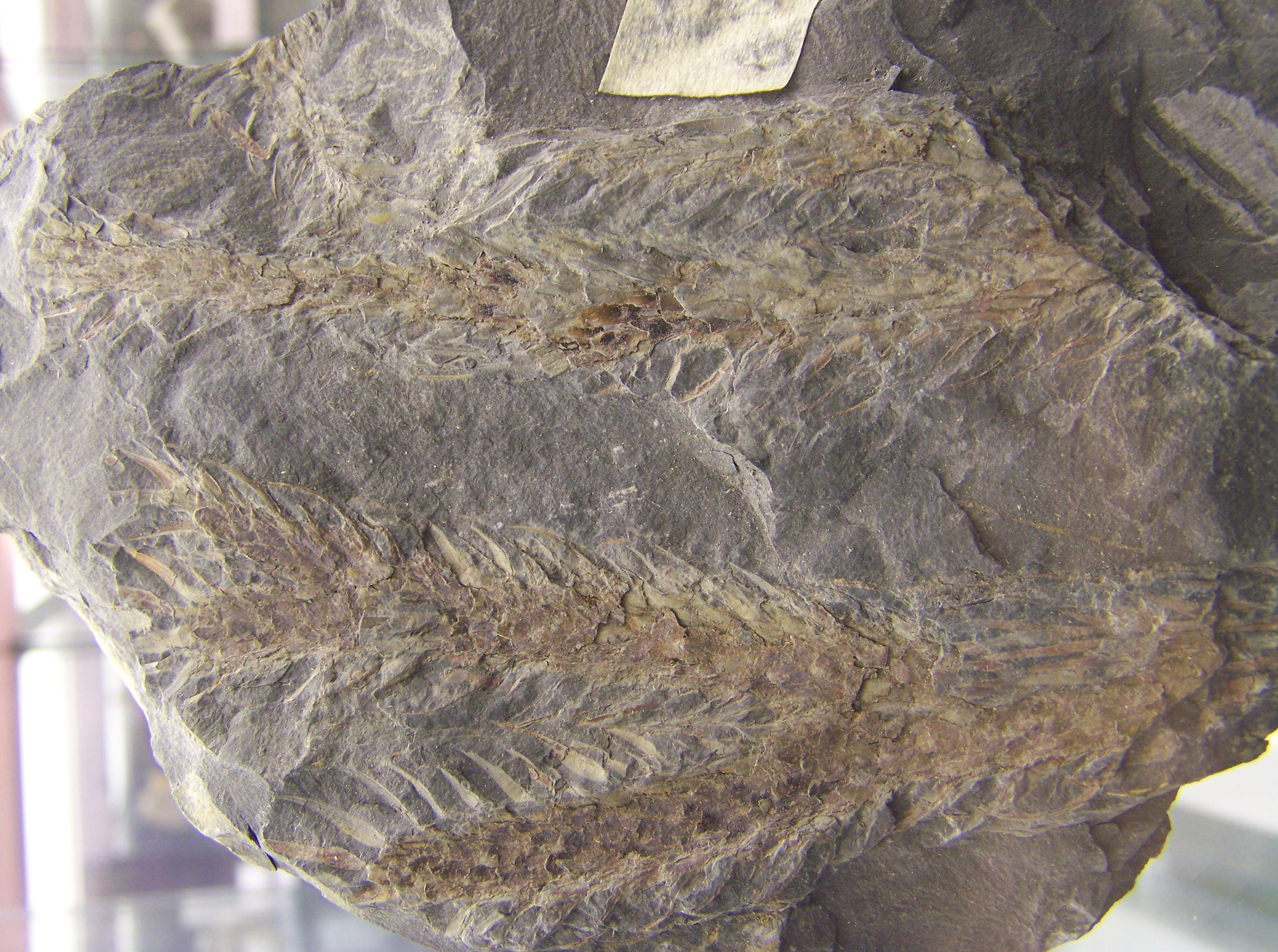
Lepidodendron lycopodioides

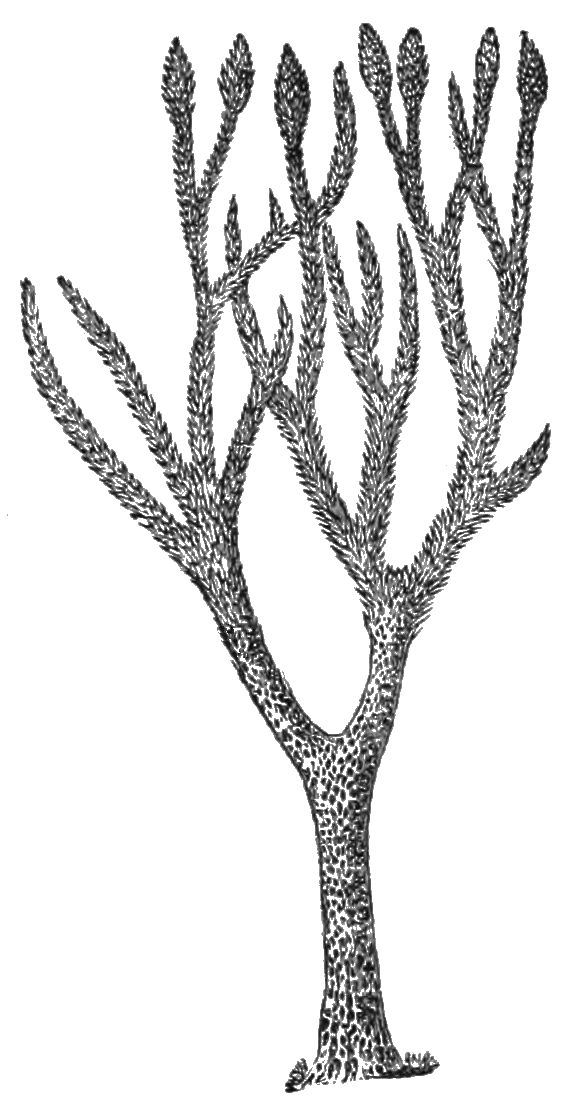
Restoration of Lepidodendron with leafy branches

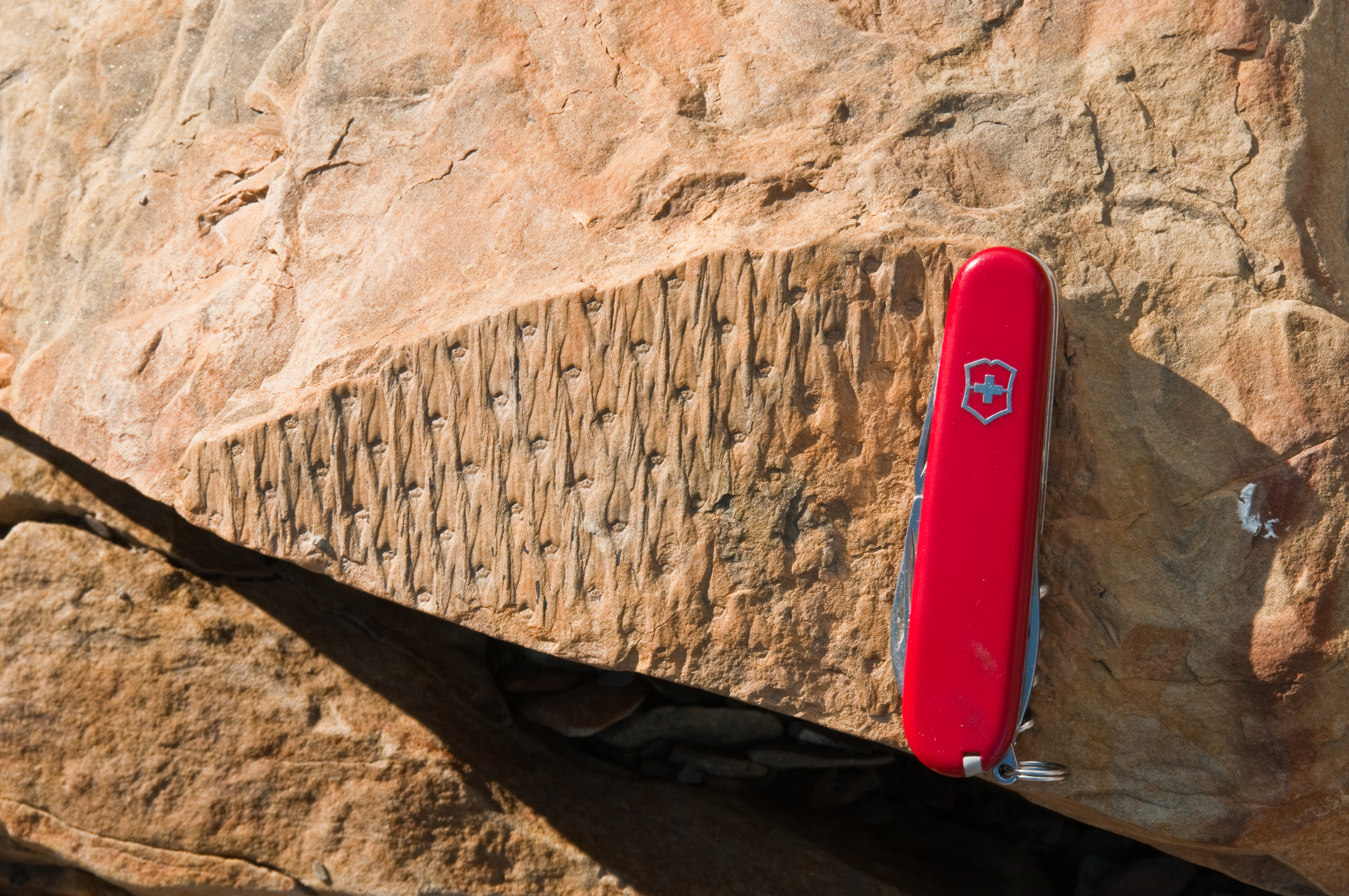
Lepidodendron bark from Joggins, Nova Scotia, Canada

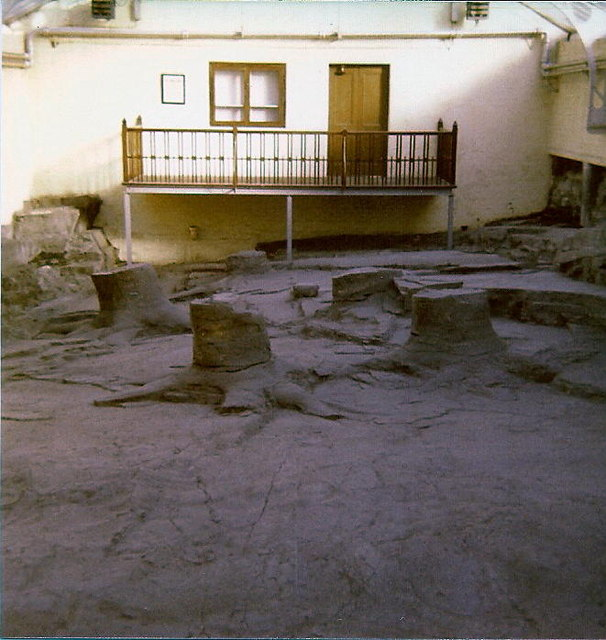
Lepidodendron fossil stumps from Fossil Grove, Glasgow, Scotland

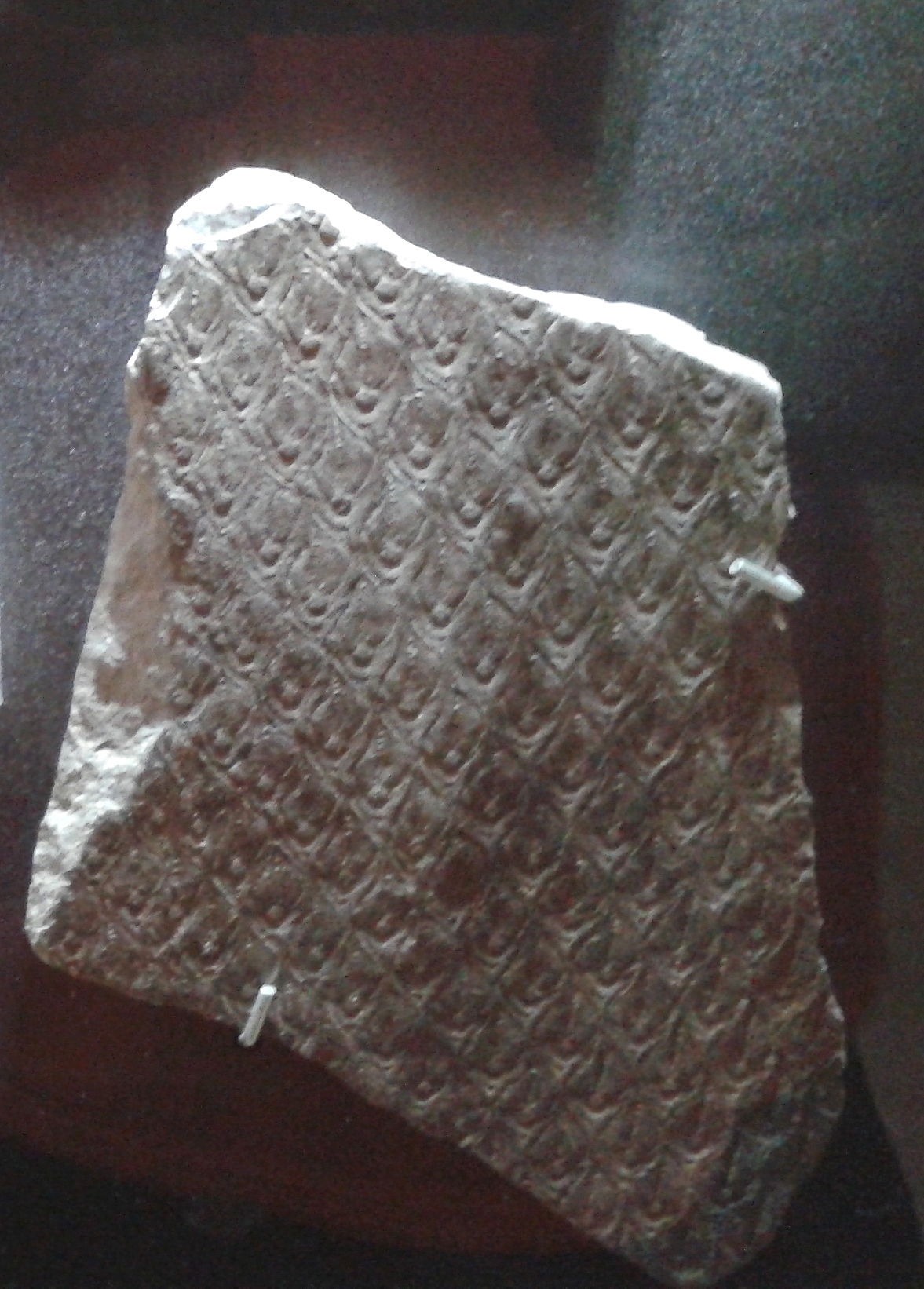
Lepidodendron sp. stem impression displayed at a collection held in the National Museum of Brazil

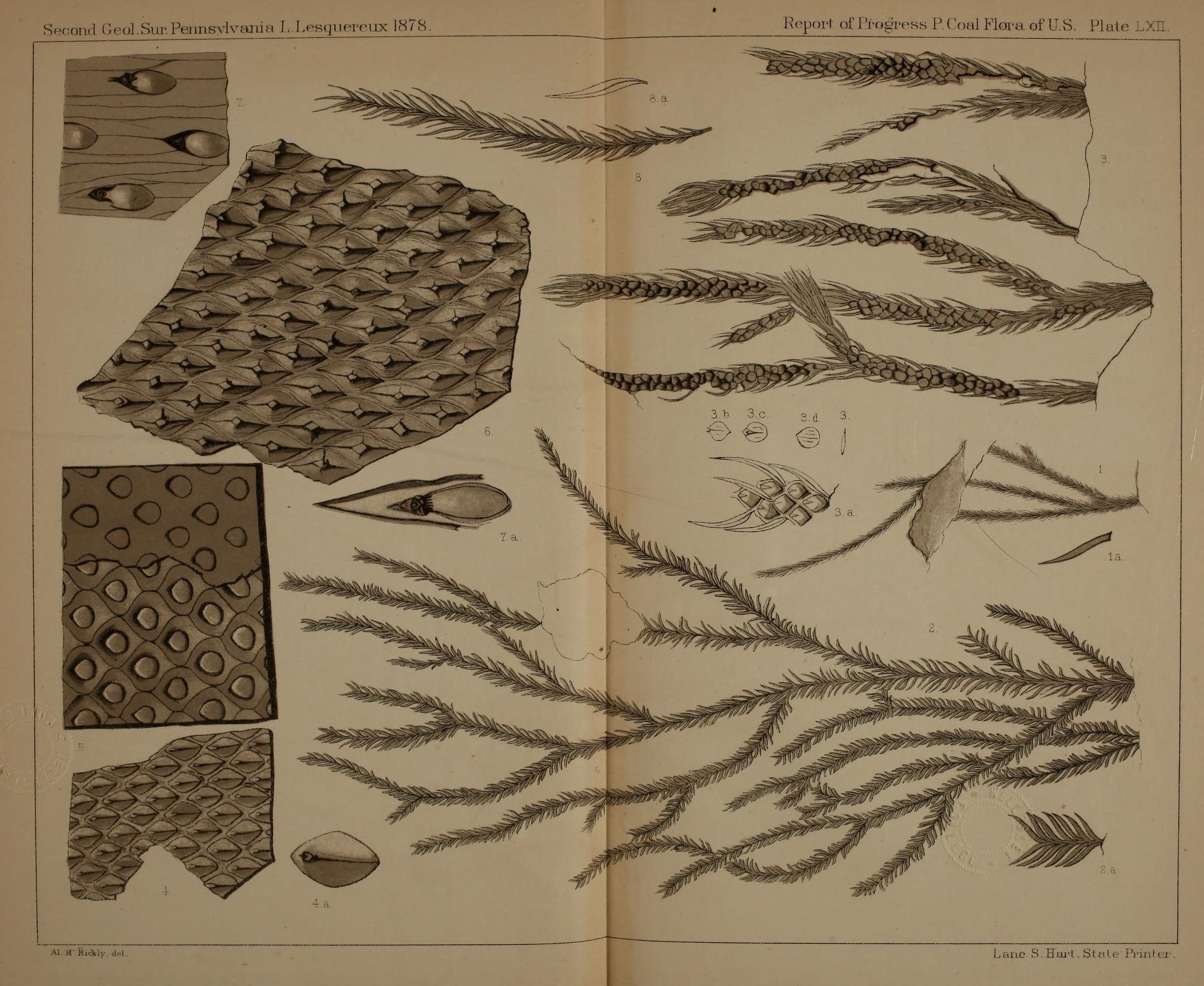
Various Lepidodendron diagrams from the Geological Survey of Pennsylvania

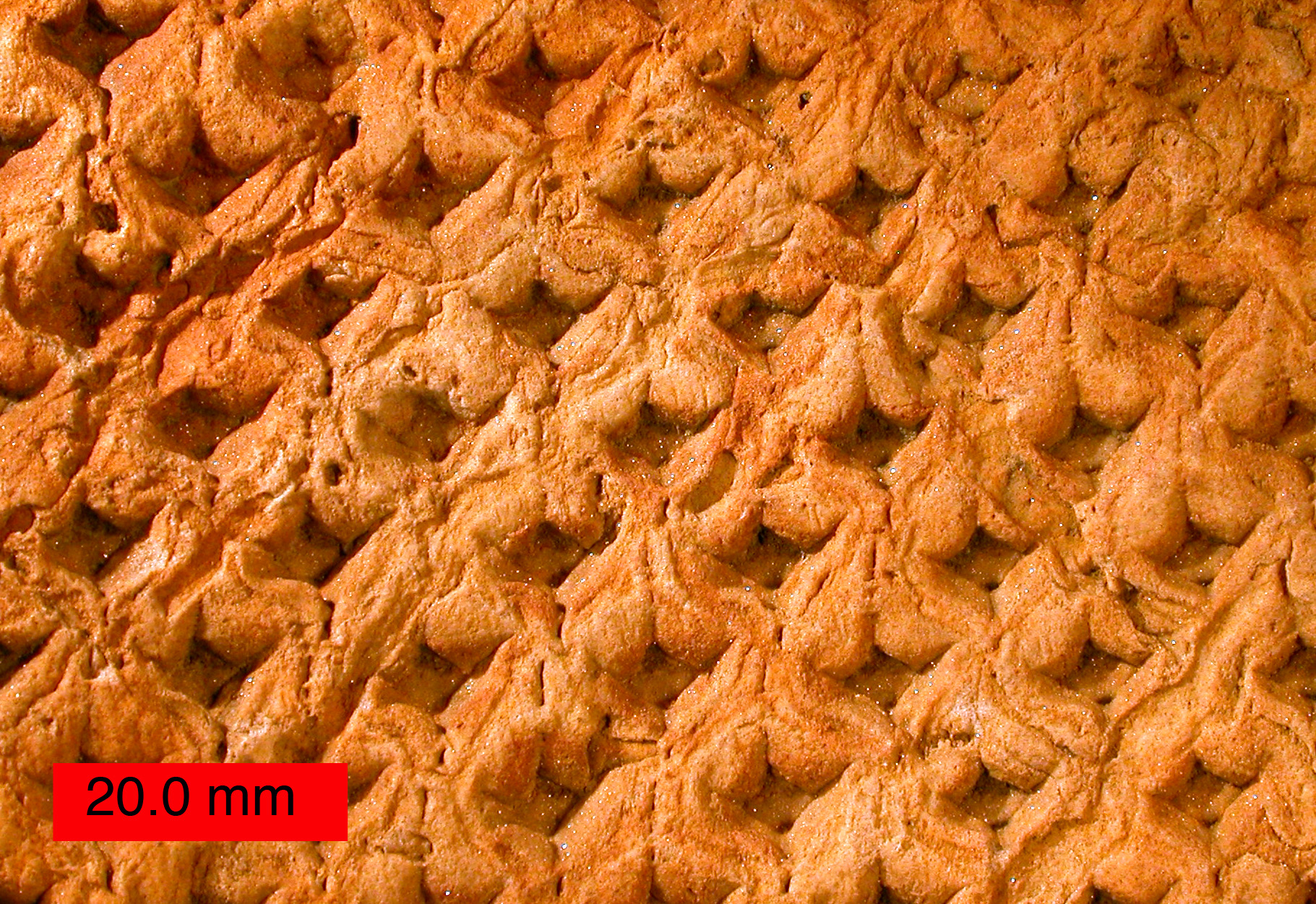
External mold of Lepidodendron from the Upper Carboniferous of Ohio.

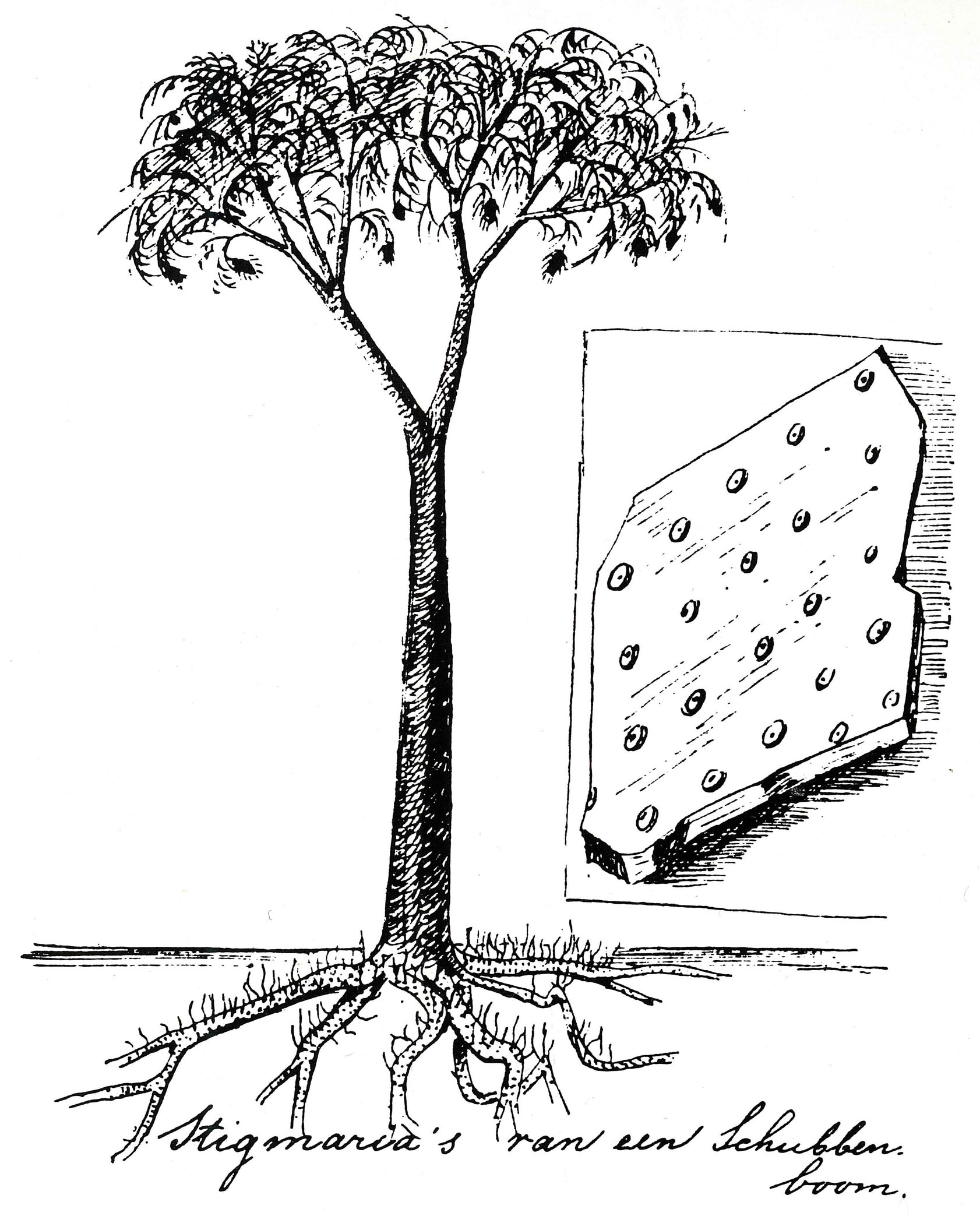
1911 reconstruction of a mature Lepidodendron, showing dichotomous branching at the top of the trunk

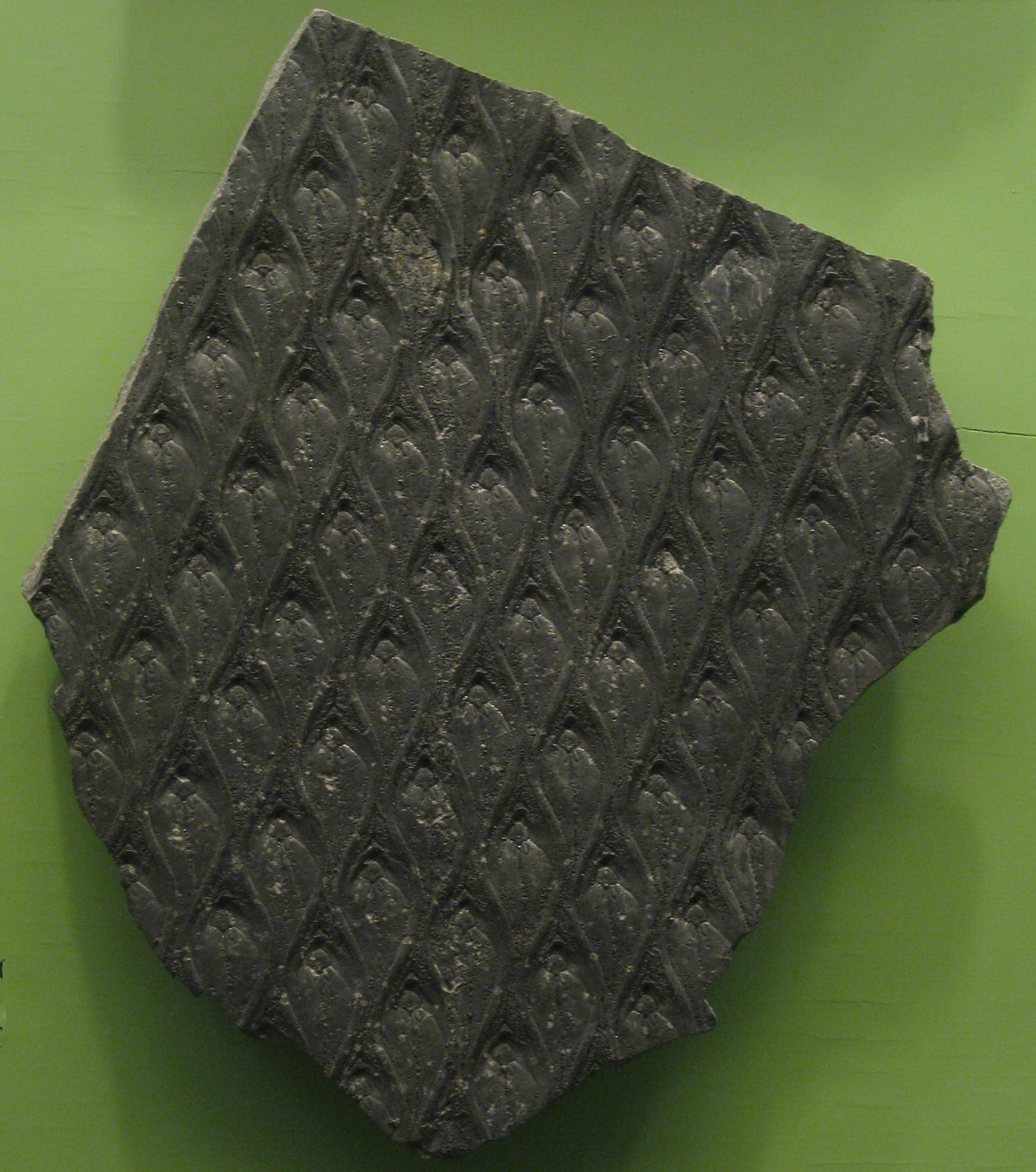
Trunk fragment, showing leaf base scars

Lepidodendron trunk

== See also ==
- Archaeopteris
- Carboniferous
- Evolutionary history of plants
- Fossil Grove
- Glossopteris
- Lepidodendrales
- Lycophytes
- Lycopsid
- Stigmaria
- Sigillaria
