= Dendrochronology =

Method of dating based on the analysis of patterns of tree rings

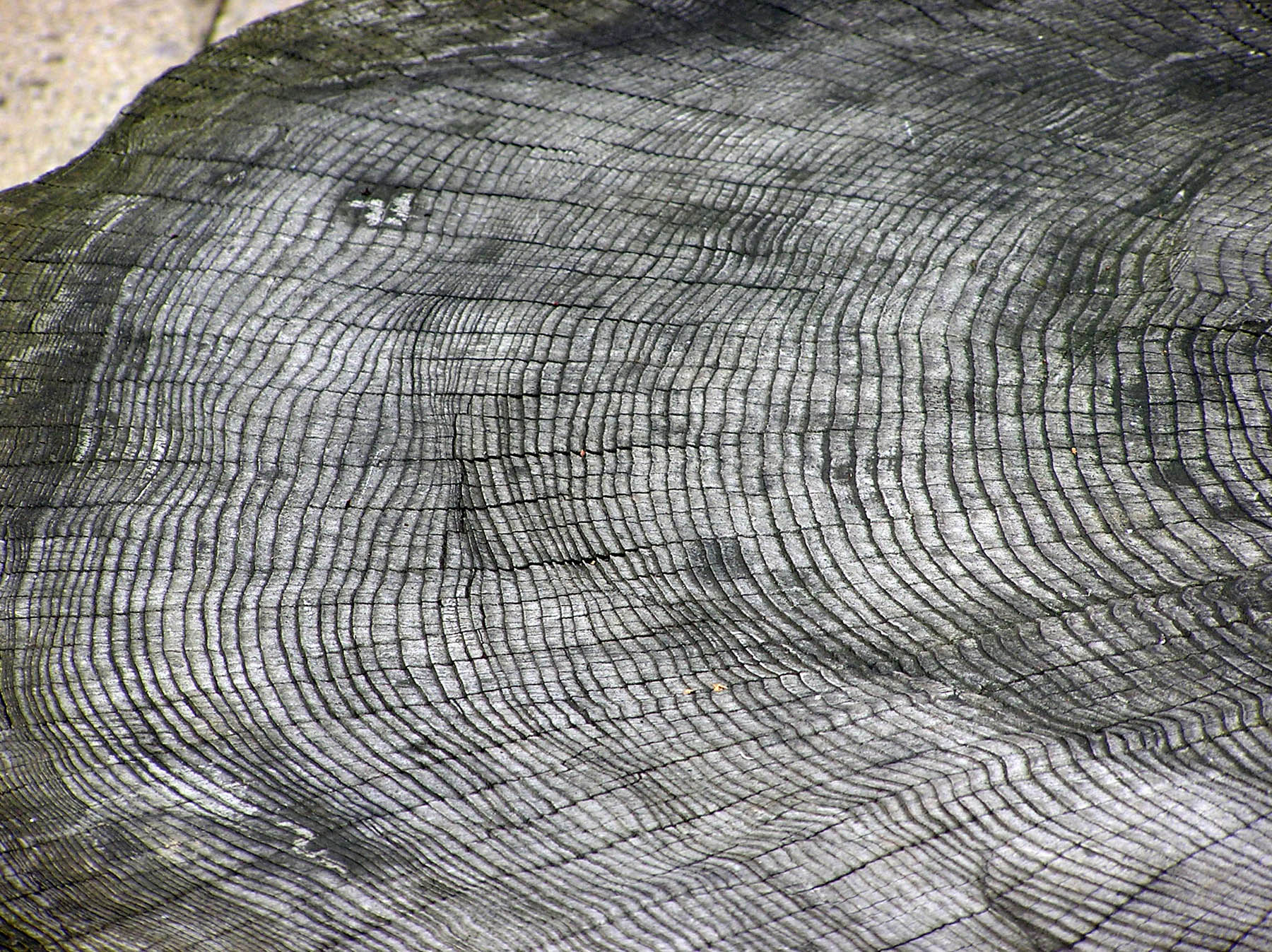
The growth rings of a tree at Bristol Zoo, England. Each ring represents one year; the outside rings, near the bark, are the youngest

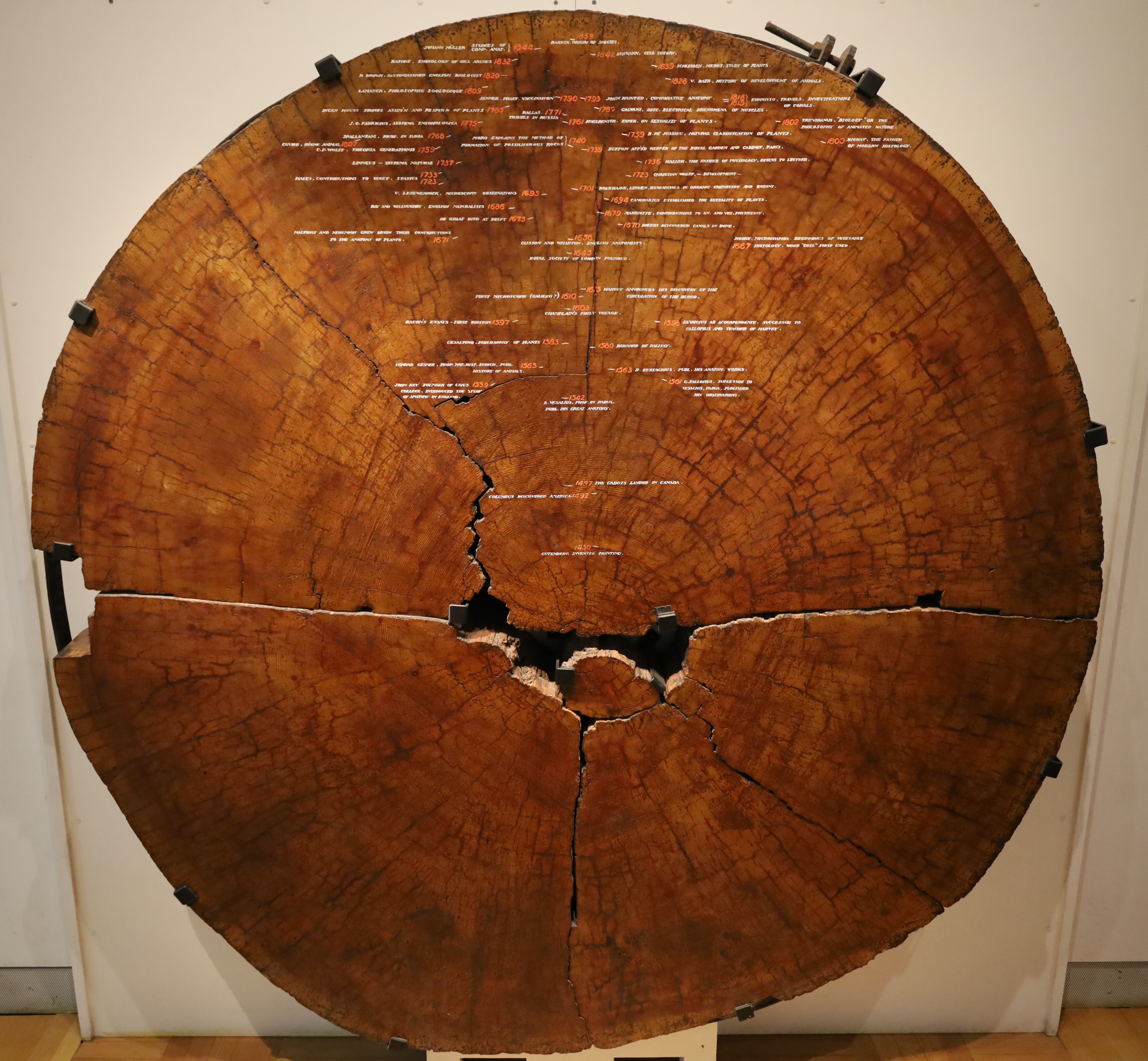
A "tree cookie" cross-section of a Coast Douglas-fir tree displayed in the Royal Ontario Museum. The tree was over 500 years old when it was cut down in British Columbia in the 1890s. The markings indicating historical events were added in the 1920s.

Dendrochronology (or tree-ring dating) is the scientific method of dating tree rings (also called growth rings) to the exact year they were formed in a tree. As well as dating them, this can give data for dendroclimatology, the study of climate and atmospheric conditions during different periods in history from the wood of old trees. Dendrochronology derives from the Ancient Greek dendron (δένδρον), meaning "tree", khronos (χρόνος), meaning "time", and -logia (-λογία), "the study of".

Dendrochronology is useful for determining the precise age of samples, especially those that are too recent for radiocarbon dating, which always produces a range rather than an exact date. However, for a precise date of the death of the tree a full sample to the edge is needed, which most trimmed timber will not provide. It also gives data on the timing of events and rates of change in the environment (most prominently climate) and also in wood found in archaeology or works of art and architecture, such as old panel paintings. It is also used as a check in radiocarbon dating to calibrate radiocarbon ages.

New growth in trees occurs in a layer of cells near the bark. A tree's growth rate changes in a predictable pattern throughout the year in response to seasonal climate changes, resulting in visible growth rings. Each ring marks a complete cycle of seasons, or one year, in the tree's life. As of 2020, securely dated tree-ring data for the Northern Hemisphere is available going back 13,910 BP (years before 1950). A new method is based on measuring variations in oxygen isotopes in each ring, and this 'isotope dendrochronology' can yield results on samples which are not suitable for traditional dendrochronology due to too few or too similar rings. Some regions have "floating sequences", with gaps which mean that earlier periods can only be approximately dated. As of 2024, only three areas have continuous sequences going back to prehistoric times: the foothills of the Northern Alps, the southwestern United States, and the British Isles. Miyake events, which are major spikes in cosmic rays at known dates, are visible in trees rings and can fix the dating of a floating sequence.

== History ==
The Greek botanist Theophrastus (c. 371 – c. 287 BC) first mentioned that the wood of trees has rings. In his 1651 Trattato della Pittura (Treatise on Painting), Leonardo da Vinci (1452–1519) was the first person to mention that trees form rings annually and that their thickness is determined by the conditions under which they grew. In 1737, French investigators Henri-Louis Duhamel du Monceau and Georges-Louis Leclerc de Buffon examined the effect of growing conditions on the shape of tree rings. They found that in 1709, a severe winter produced a distinctly dark tree ring, which served as a reference for subsequent European naturalists. In the U.S., Alexander Catlin Twining (1801–1884) suggested in 1833 that patterns among tree rings could be used to synchronize the dendrochronology of various trees and thereby to reconstruct past climates across entire regions. The English polymath Charles Babbage proposed using dendrochronology to date the remains of trees in peat bogs or even in geological strata (1835, 1838).

During the later half of the nineteenth century, the scientific study of tree rings and the application of dendrochronology began. In 1859, the German-American Jacob Kuechler (1823–1893) used crossdating to examine oaks (Quercus stellata) in order to study the record of climate in western Texas. In 1866, the German botanist, entomologist, and forester Julius Theodor Christian Ratzeburg (1801–1871) observed the effects on tree rings of defoliation caused by insect infestations. By 1882, this observation was already appearing in forestry textbooks. In the 1870s, the Dutch astronomer Jacobus Kapteyn (1851–1922) was using crossdating to reconstruct the climates of the Netherlands and Germany. In 1881, the Swiss-Austrian forester Arthur von Seckendorff-Gudent (1845–1886) was using crossdating. From 1869 to 1901, Robert Hartig (1839–1901), a German professor of forest pathology, wrote a series of papers on the anatomy and ecology of tree rings. One of the earlies attempts to date an archaeological site in the United States was by Manesseh Cutler in 1888. He estimated the date of the Marietta Earthworks by having trees growing on it cut down and counting the number of rings. In 1892, the Russian physicist Fedor Nikiforovich Shvedov (1841–1905) wrote that he had used patterns found in tree rings to predict droughts in 1882 and 1891.

During the first half of the twentieth century, the astronomer A. E. Douglass founded the Laboratory of Tree-Ring Research at the University of Arizona. Douglass sought to better understand cycles of sunspot activity and reasoned that changes in solar activity would affect climate patterns on earth, which would subsequently be recorded by tree-ring growth patterns (i.e., sunspots → climate → tree rings).

== Methods ==
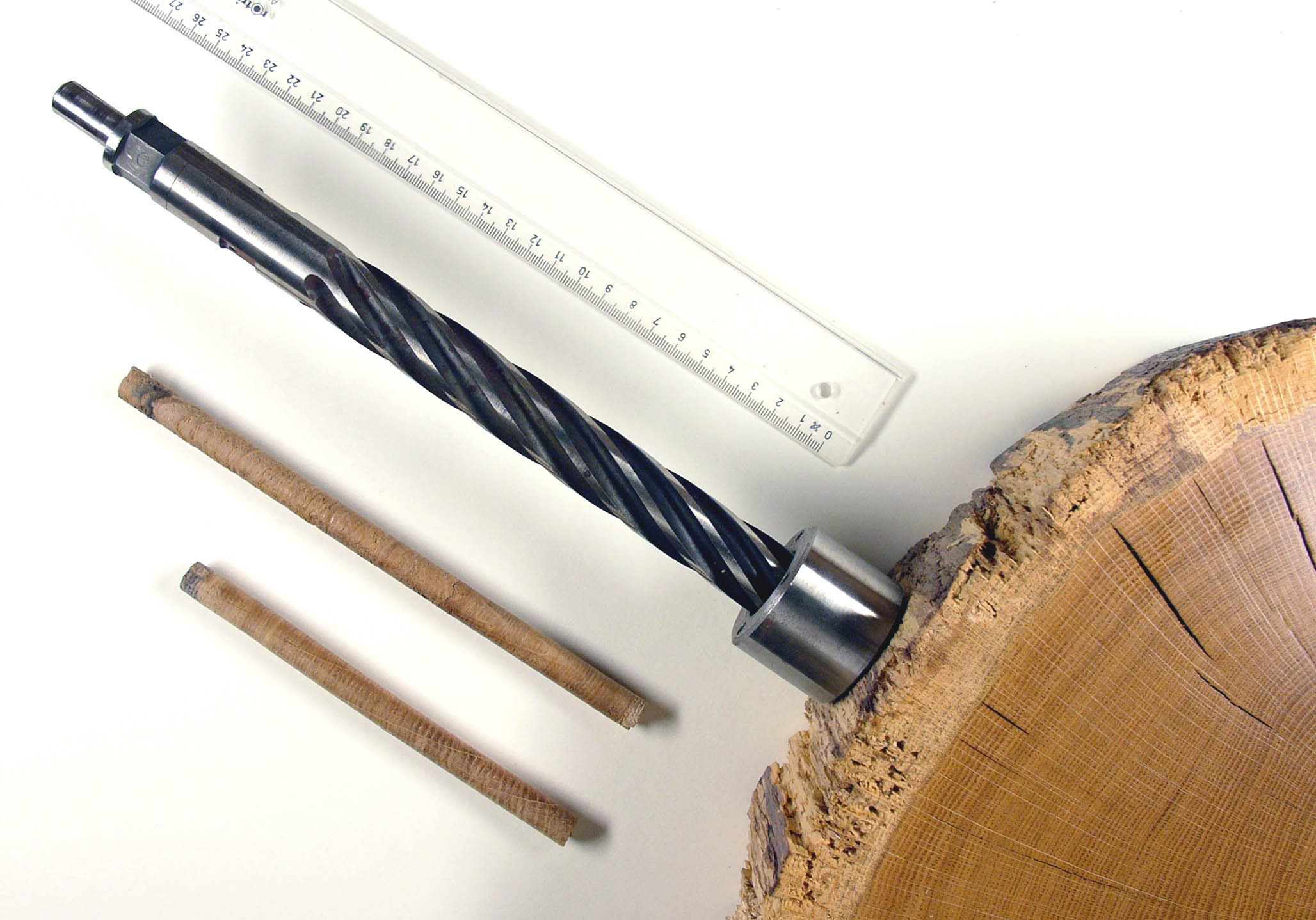
Drill for dendrochronology sampling and growth ring counting

=== Growth rings ===
Diagram of secondary growth in a tree showing idealised vertical and horizontal sections. A new layer of wood is added in each growing season, thickening the stem, existing branches and roots, to form a growth ring.

Horizontal cross sections cut through the trunk of a tree can reveal growth rings, also referred to as tree rings or annual rings. Growth rings result from new growth in the vascular cambium, a layer of cells near the bark that botanists classify as a lateral meristem; this growth in diameter is known as secondary growth. Visible rings result from the change in growth speed through the seasons of the year; thus, critical for the title method, one ring generally marks the passage of one year in the life of the tree. Removal of the bark of the tree in a particular area may cause deformation of the rings as the plant overgrows the scar.

The rings are more visible in trees which have grown in temperate zones, where the seasons differ more markedly. The inner portion of a growth ring forms early in the growing season, when growth is comparatively rapid (hence the wood is less dense) and is known as "early wood" (or "spring wood", or "late-spring wood"); the outer portion is the "late wood" (sometimes termed "summer wood", often being produced in the summer, though sometimes in the autumn) and is denser.

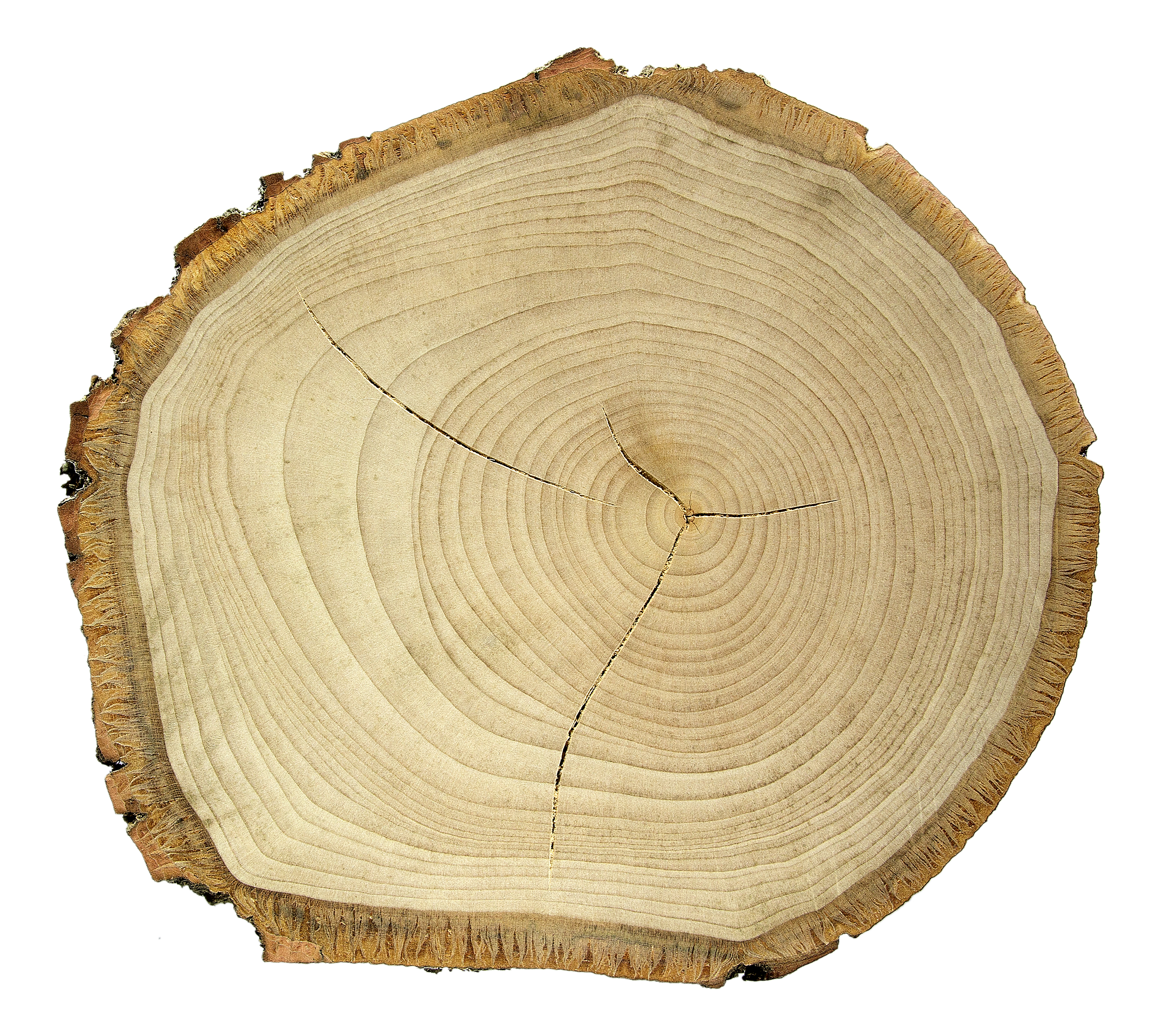
Silver lime cross section showing annual rings.

Many trees in temperate zones produce one growth-ring each year, with the newest adjacent to the bark. Hence, for the entire period of a tree's life, a year-by-year record or ring pattern builds up that reflects the age of the tree and the climatic conditions in which the tree grew. Adequate moisture and a long growing season result in a wide ring, while a drought year may result in a very narrow one.

Direct reading of tree ring chronologies is a complex science, for several reasons. First, contrary to the single-ring-per-year paradigm, alternating poor and favorable conditions, such as mid-summer droughts, can result in several rings forming in a given year. In addition, particular tree species may present "missing rings", and this influences the selection of trees for study of long time-spans. For instance, missing rings are rare in oak and elm trees.

A vector graphic image labeling the rings of a tree. Includes alburnum, medulla, duramen, bast, and rhytidome.

Critical to the science, trees from the same region tend to develop the same patterns of ring widths for a given period of chronological study. Researchers can compare and match these patterns ring-for-ring with patterns from trees which have grown at the same time in the same geographical zone (and therefore under similar climatic conditions). When one can match these tree-ring patterns across successive trees in the same locale, in overlapping fashion, chronologies can be built up—both for entire geographical regions and for sub-regions. Moreover, wood from ancient structures with known chronologies can be matched to the tree-ring data (a technique called 'cross-dating'), and the age of the wood can thereby be determined precisely. Dendrochronologists originally carried out cross-dating by visual inspection; more recently, they have harnessed computers to do the task, applying statistical techniques to assess the matching. To eliminate individual variations in tree-ring growth, dendrochronologists take the smoothed average of the tree-ring widths of multiple tree-samples to build up a 'ring history', a process termed replication. A tree-ring history whose beginning- and end-dates are not known is called a 'floating chronology'. It can be anchored by cross-matching a section against another chronology (tree-ring history) whose dates are known.

A fully anchored and cross-matched chronology for oak and pine in central Europe extends back 12,460 years, and an oak chronology goes back 7,506 years in Bohemia, 7,429 years in Ireland and 6,939 years in England. Comparison of radiocarbon and dendrochronological ages supports the consistency of these two independent dendrochronological sequences. Another fully anchored chronology that extends back 8,500 years exists for the bristlecone pine in the Southwest US (White Mountains of California).

=== Dendrochronological equation ===
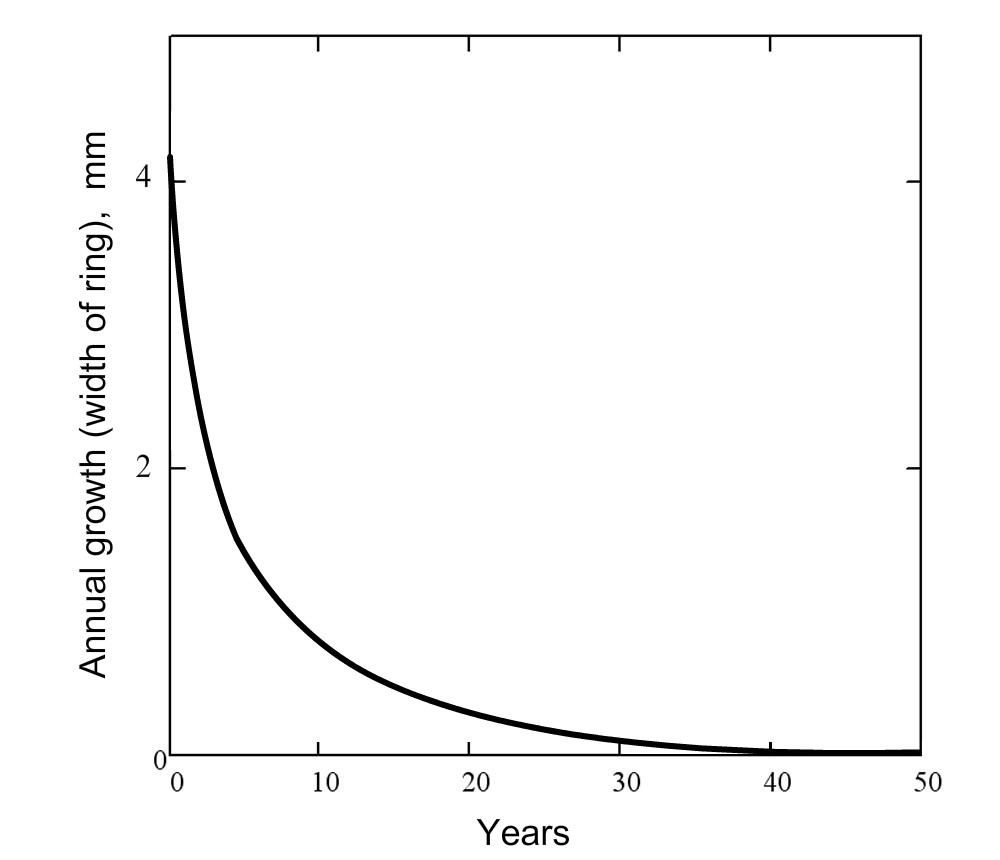
A typical form of the function of the wood ring width in accordance with the dendrochronological equation

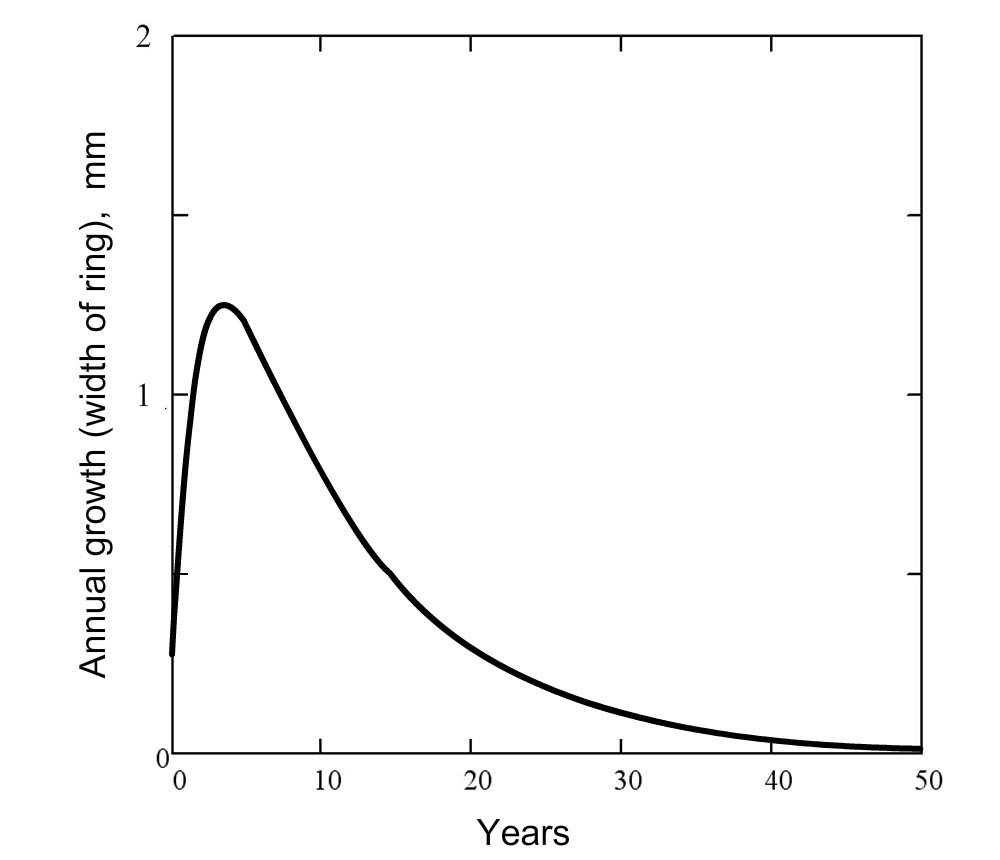
A typical form of the function of the wood ring (in accordance with the dendrochronological equation) with an increase in the width of wood ring at initial stage

The dendrochronological equation defines the law of growth of tree rings. The equation was proposed by Russian biophysicist Alexandr N. Tetearing in his work "Theory of populations" in the form:

$$\Delta L(t) = \frac{1}{k_v\, \rho^{\frac{1}{3}}} \, \frac{d\left(M^{\frac{1}{3}}(t)\right)}{dt},$$

where ΔL is width of annual ring, t is time (in years), ρ is density of wood, k_{v} is some coefficient, M(t) is function of mass growth of the tree.

Ignoring the natural sinusoidal oscillations in tree mass, the formula for the changes in the annual ring width is:

$$\Delta L(t) = -\frac{ c_1 e^{-a_1 t}+ c_2 e^{-a_2 t} }{3 k_v \rho^{\frac{1}{3}} \left(c_4+ c_1 e^{-a_1 t}+ c_2 e^{-a_2 t}\right)^{\frac{2}{3}}}$$

where c_{1}, c_{2}, and c_{4} are some coefficients, a_{1} and a_{2} are positive constants.

The formula is useful for correct approximation of samples data before data normalization procedure. The typical forms of the function ΔL(t) of annual growth of wood ring are shown in the figures.

=== Sampling and dating ===
Dendrochronology allows specimens of once-living material to be accurately dated to a specific year. Dates are often represented as estimated calendar years B.P., for before present, where "present" refers to 1 January 1950.

Timber core samples are sampled (often using an increment borer) and used to measure the width of annual growth rings; by taking samples from different sites within a particular region, researchers can build a comprehensive historical sequence. The techniques of dendrochronology are more consistent in areas where trees grew in marginal conditions such as aridity or semi-aridity where the ring growth is more sensitive to the environment, rather than in humid areas where tree-ring growth is more uniform (complacent). In addition, some genera of trees are more suitable than others for this type of analysis. For instance, the bristlecone pine is exceptionally long-lived and slow growing, and has been used extensively for chronologies; still-living and dead specimens of this species provide tree-ring patterns going back thousands of years, in some regions more than 10,000 years. Currently, the maximum span for fully anchored chronology is a little over 11,000 years B.P.

IntCal20 is the 2020 "Radiocarbon Age Calibration Curve", which provides a calibrated carbon 14 dated sequence going back 55,000 years. The most recent part, going back 13,900 years, is based on tree rings.

=== Reference sequences ===
European chronologies derived from wooden structures initially found it difficult to bridge the gap in the fourteenth century when there was a building hiatus, which coincided with the Black Death. However, there do exist unbroken chronologies dating back to prehistoric times, for example the Danish chronology dating back to 352 BC.

Given a sample of wood, the variation of the tree-ring growths not only provides a match by year, but can also match location because climate varies from place to place. This makes it possible to determine the source of ships as well as smaller artifacts made from wood, but which were transported long distances, such as panels for paintings and ship timbers.

=== Miyake events ===
Miyake events, such as the ones in 774–775 and 993–994, can provide fixed reference points in an unknown time sequence as they are due to cosmic radiation. As they appear as spikes in carbon 14 in tree rings for that year all round the world, they can be used to date historical events to the year. For example, wooden houses in the Viking site at L'Anse aux Meadows in Newfoundland were dated by finding the layer with the 993 spike, which showed that the wood is from a tree felled in 1021. Researchers at the University of Bern have provided exact dating of a floating sequence in a Neolithic settlement in northern Greece by tying it to a spike in cosmogenic radiocarbon in 5259 BC.

=== Frost rings ===
Frost ring is a term used to designate a layer of deformed, collapsed tracheids and traumatic parenchyma cells in tree ring analysis. They are formed when air temperature falls below freezing during a period of cambial activity. They can be used in dendrochronology to indicate years that are colder than usual.

== Applications ==
=== Radiocarbon dating calibration ===
Dates from dendrochronology can be used as a calibration and check of radiocarbon dating. This can be done by checking radiocarbon dates against long master sequences, with Californian bristle-cone pines in Arizona being used to develop this method of calibration as the longevity of the trees (up to c.4900 years) in addition to the use of dead samples meant a long, unbroken tree ring sequence could be developed (dating back to c. 6700 BC). Additional studies of European oak trees, such as the master sequence in Germany that dates back to c. 8500 BC, can also be used to back up and further calibrate radiocarbon dates.

=== Climatology ===
Dendroclimatology is the science of determining past climates from trees primarily from the properties of the annual tree rings. Other properties of the annual rings, such as maximum latewood density (MXD) have been shown to be better proxies than simple ring width. Using tree rings, scientists have estimated many local climates for hundreds to thousands of years previous.

=== Art history ===
Dendrochronology has become important to art historians in the dating of panel paintings. However, unlike analysis of samples from buildings, which are typically sent to a laboratory, wooden supports for paintings usually have to be measured in a museum conservation department, which places limitations on the techniques that can be used.

In addition to dating, dendrochronology can also provide information as to the source of the panel. Many Early Netherlandish paintings have turned out to be painted on panels of "Baltic oak" shipped from the Vistula region via ports of the Hanseatic League. Oak panels were used in a number of northern countries such as England, France and Germany. Wooden supports other than oak were rarely used by Netherlandish painters.

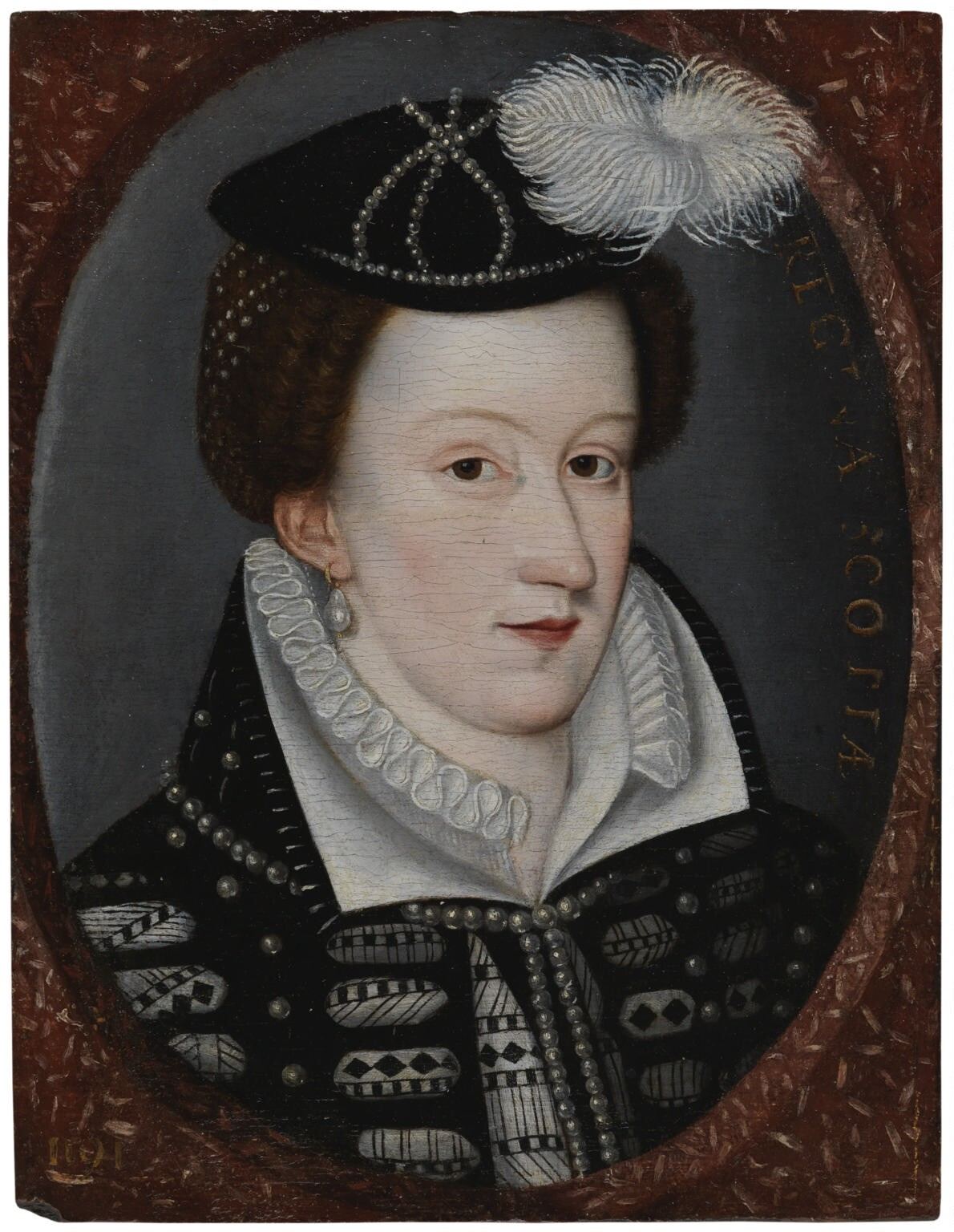
A portrait of Mary, Queen of Scots, determined to date from the sixteenth century by dendrochronology

Since panels of seasoned wood were used, an uncertain number of years has to be allowed for seasoning when estimating dates. Panels were trimmed of the outer rings, and often each panel only uses a small part of the radius of the trunk. Consequently, dating studies usually result in a terminus post quem (earliest possible) date, and a tentative date for the arrival of a seasoned raw panel using assumptions as to these factors. As a result of establishing numerous sequences, it was possible to date 85–90% of the 250 paintings from the fourteenth to seventeenth century analysed between 1971 and 1982; by now a much greater number have been analysed.

A portrait of Mary, Queen of Scots in the National Portrait Gallery, London was believed to be an eighteenth-century copy. However, dendrochronology revealed that the wood dated from the second half of the sixteenth century. It is now regarded as an original sixteenth-century painting by an unknown artist.

On the other hand, dendrochronology was applied to four paintings depicting the same subject, that of Christ expelling the money-lenders from the Temple. The results showed that the age of the wood was too late for any of them to have been painted by Hieronymus Bosch.

While dendrochronology has become an important tool for dating oak panels, it is not effective in dating the poplar panels often used by Italian painters because of the erratic growth rings in poplar.

The sixteenth century saw a gradual replacement of wooden panels by canvas as the support for paintings, which means the technique is less often applicable to later paintings. In addition, many panel paintings were transferred onto canvas or other supports during the nineteenth and twentieth centuries.

=== Archaeology ===
The dating of buildings with wooden structures and components is also done by dendrochronology; dendroarchaeology is the term for the application of dendrochronology in archaeology. While archaeologists can date wood and when it was felled, it may be difficult to definitively determine the age of a building or structure in which the wood was used; the wood could have been reused from an older structure, may have been felled and left for many years before use, or could have been used to replace a damaged piece of wood. The dating of building via dendrochronology thus requires knowledge of the history of building technology. Many prehistoric forms of buildings used "posts" that were whole young tree trunks; where the bottom of the post has survived in the ground these can be especially useful for dating.

Examples:

- The Post Track and Sweet Track, ancient timber trackways in the Somerset levels, England, have been dated to 3838 BC and 3807 BC.
- Navan Fort where in Prehistoric Ireland a large structure was built with more than two hundred posts. The central oak post was felled in 95 BC.
- The Fairbanks House in Dedham, Massachusetts. While the house had long been claimed to have been built c. 1640 (and being the oldest wood-framed house in North America), core samples of wood taken from a summer beam confirmed the wood was from an oak tree felled in 1637–8, as wood was not seasoned before use in building at that time in New England. An additional sample from another beam yielded a date of 1641, thus confirming the house had been constructed starting in 1638 and finished sometime after 1641 .
- The burial chamber of Gorm the Old, who died c. 958, was constructed from wood of timbers felled in 958.
- Veliky Novgorod, where, between the tenth and the fifteenth century, numerous consecutive layers of wooden log pavement have been placed over the accumulating dirt.
- The Neolithic well with linings made of oak wood, found near Ostrov, Czech Republic, have been dated to 5,482-5,243 BC.

== Measurement platforms, software, and data formats ==
There are many different file formats used to store tree ring width data. Effort for standardisation was made with the development of TRiDaS. Further development led to the database software Tellervo, which is based on the new standard format whilst being able to import lots of different data formats. The desktop application can be attached to measurement devices and works with the database server that is installed separately.

== Continuous sequence ==
Bard et al. write in 2023: "The oldest tree-ring series are known as floating since, while their constituent rings can be counted to create a relative internal chronology, they cannot be dendro-matched with the main Holocene absolute chronology. However, 14C analyses performed at high resolution on overlapped absolute and floating tree-rings series enable one to link them almost absolutely and hence to extend the calibration on annual tree rings until ≈13 900 cal yr BP."

Some of the longest tree-ring timelines, especially those extending earlier than about 4000 BC, are joined by comparing how similar the ring patterns look instead of by directly overlapping pieces of wood from different trees. In those sections only a few samples match, so the connection is less certain.

== Related chronologies ==
Herbchronology is the analysis of annual growth rings (or simply annual rings) in the secondary root xylem of perennial herbaceous plants. Similar seasonal patterns also occur in ice cores and in varves (layers of sediment deposition in a lake, river, or sea bed). The deposition pattern in the core will vary for a frozen-over lake versus an ice-free lake, and with the fineness of the sediment. Sclerochronology is the study of algae deposits.

Some columnar cacti also exhibit similar seasonal patterns in the isotopes of carbon and oxygen in their spines (acanthochronology). These are used for dating in a manner similar to dendrochronology, and such techniques are used in combination with dendrochronology, to plug gaps and to extend the range of the seasonal data available to archaeologists and paleoclimatologists.

A similar technique is used to estimate the age of fish stocks through the analysis of growth rings in the otolith bones.

== See also ==
- Dendrology
- International Tree-Ring Data Bank
- Post excavation
- Timeline of dendrochronology timestamp events
