= International Tree-Ring Data Bank =

The International Tree-Ring Data Bank (ITRDB) is a data repository for tree ring measurements that has been maintained since 1990 by the United States' National Oceanic and Atmospheric Administration Paleoclimatology Program and World Data Center for Paleoclimatology. The ITRDB was initially established by Hal Fritts through the Laboratory of Tree-Ring Research at the University of Arizona, with a grant from the US National Science Foundation, following the First International Workshop on Dendrochronology in 1974. The ITRDB accepts all tree ring data with sufficient metadata to be uploaded, but its founding focus was on tree ring measurements intended for climatic studies.

Specific information is required for uploading data to the database, such as the raw tree ring measurements, an indication of the type of measurement (full ring widths, earlywood, latewood), and the location. However, the types of data and the rules for accuracy and precision of the primary data, tree-ring width measurements, are decided by the dendrochronologists who are contributing the data, rather than by NOAA or any other governing organization.

== See also ==
- Dendrochronology
