= Herbchronology =

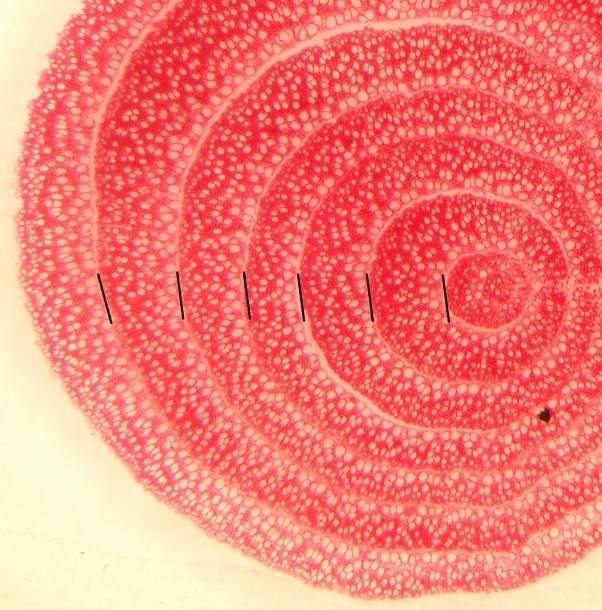
Root cross section (30 μm) of Penstemon venustus. Lignified tissue is stained reddish using Phloroglucinol/HCL. Black markers denote annual ring borders. Individual collected at the Wallowa Mts., Oregon, USA (2003)

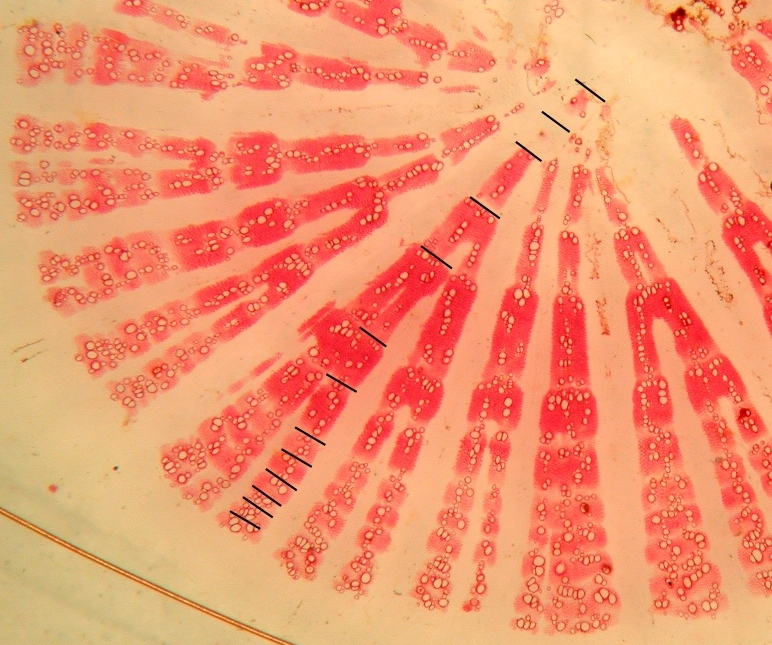
Root cross section (30 μm) of Cirsium spinosissimum. Lignified tissue is stained reddish using Phloroglucinol/HCL. Black markers denote annual ring borders. Individual collected in the Churfirsten Mountain range, Switzerland (2002)

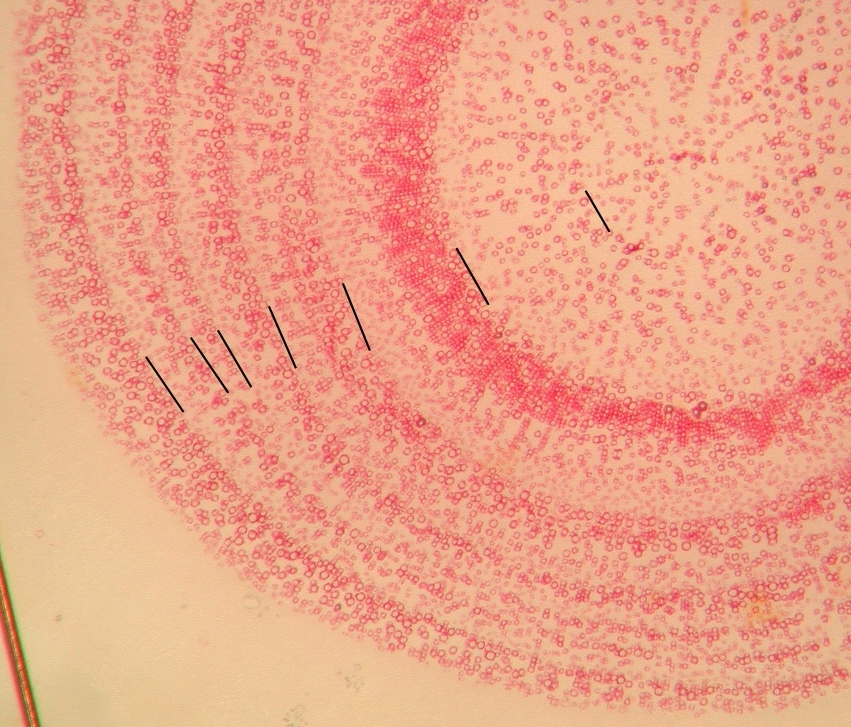
Root cross section (30 μm) of Silene vulgaris. Lignified tissue is stained reddish using Phloroglucinol/HCL. Black markers denote annual ring borders. Individual collected at Davos, Switzerland (2003)

Herbchronology is the analysis of annual growth rings (or simply annual rings) in the secondary root xylem of perennial herbaceous plants. While leaves and stems of perennial herbs die down at the end of the growing season the root often persists for many years or even the entire life. Perennial herb species belonging to the dicotyledon group (also known as perennial forbs) are characterized by secondary growth, which shows as a new growth ring added each year to persistent roots. About two thirds of all perennial dicotyledonous herb species with a persistent root that grow in the strongly seasonal zone of the northern hemisphere show at least fairly clear annual growth rings.

Counting of annual growth rings can be used to determine the age of a perennial herb similarly as it is done in trees using dendrochronology. This way it was found that some perennial herbs live up to 50 years and more.

== History ==
The term herb-chronology is referring to dendrochronology because of the similarity of the structures investigated. The term was introduced in the late 1990s, however, the existence of annual rings in perennial herbs was already observed in earlier times by several researchers.

== Annual growth rings ==
Like trees and woody plants, perennial herbs have a growth zone called vascular cambium between the root bark and the root xylem. The vascular cambium ring is active during growing season and produces a new layer of xylem tissue or growth ring every year. This addition of a new lateral layer each year is called secondary growth and is exactly the same as in woody plants. Each individual growth ring consists of earlywood tissue that is formed at the beginning of the growing season and latewood tissue formed in summer and fall. Earlywood tissue is characterized by wide vessels or denser arrangement of vessels, whereas latewood tissue shows narrower vessels and/or lower vessel density.

Annual growth rings in herbs are usually only visible by means of a microscope and a specific staining method. Ring-like patterns visible in root cross-sections by the naked eye may be "false rings".

The width of an annual growth ring depends on conditions during its formation: in a favorable year, a ring is wider, and in a less favorable year it is narrower.

== Applications ==
Herbchronology is used in many fields of ecological and biological research, for instance in community ecology, population biology, plant ecology and invasion biology.

Herbchronology is used as a tool to estimate plant age. This may be relevant information to determine :

- … the longevity of a perennial herbaceous plant species; this is valuable information for flora books and an important aspect of life history strategy of a species.
- … the population age structure; this is valuable for questions into population dynamics or the spreading patterns of invasive species.

Herbchronology allows to assess long-term annual growth rates of a perennial herbaceous plant without having to monitor it. This may be relevant information to assess …

- … the impact of fluctuations in specific climatic conditions on growth.
- … the impact of changes in site conditions such as competition.
- … lifetime growth patterns.
