= Cambium =

Layer of plant tissue with cells for growth

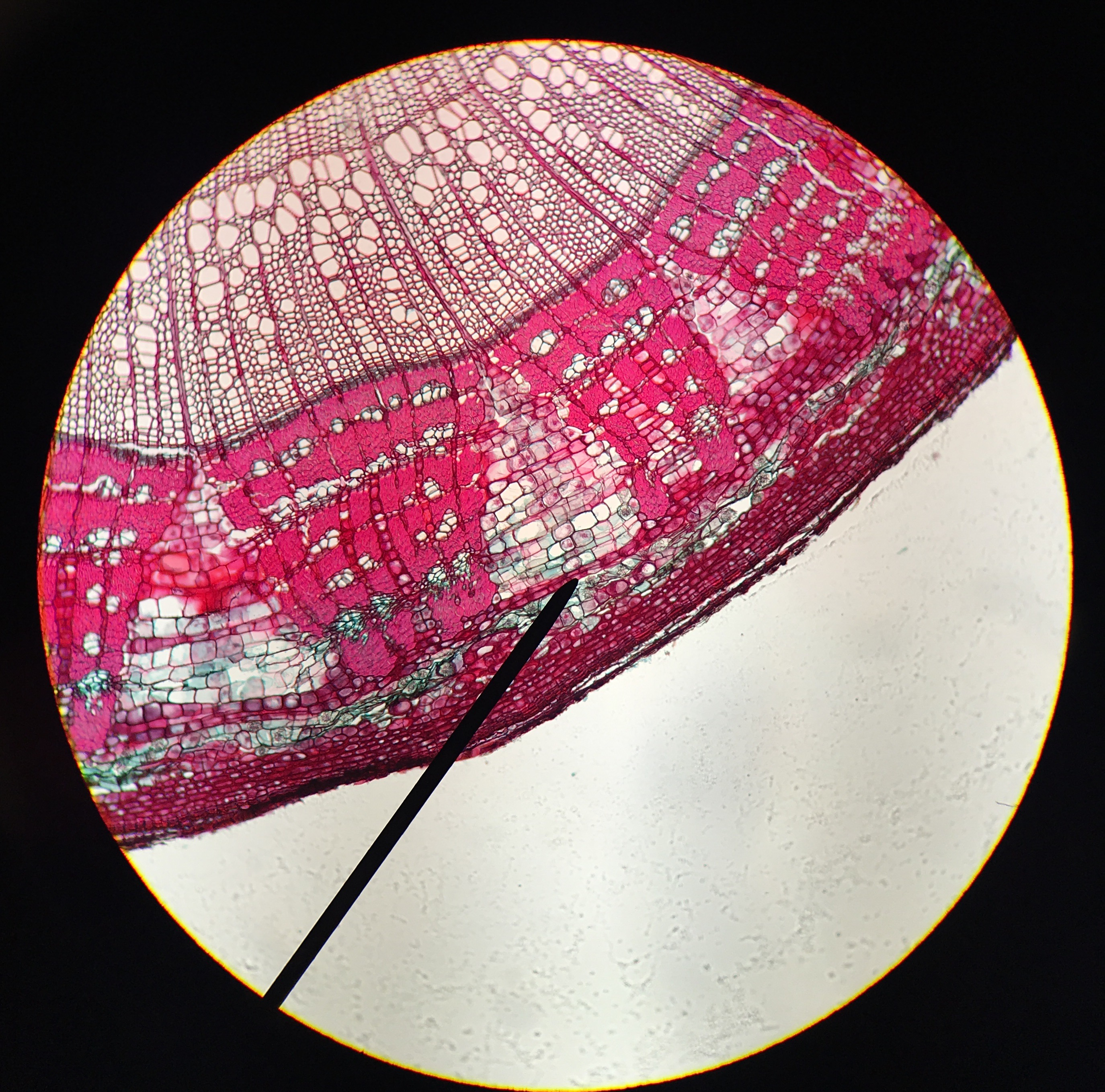
Cork cambium viewed under a microscope

A cambium (pl.: cambiums or cambia), in plants, is a tissue layer that provides partially undifferentiated cells for plant growth. It is found in the area between xylem and phloem. A cambium can also be defined as a cellular plant tissue from which phloem, xylem, or cork grows by division, resulting (in woody plants) in secondary thickening. It forms parallel rows of cells, which result in secondary tissues.

There are several distinct kinds of cambium found in plant stems and roots:

- Cork cambium, a tissue found in many vascular plants as part of the periderm.
- Unifacial cambium, which ultimately produces cells to the interior of its cylinder.
- Vascular cambium, a lateral meristem in the vascular tissue of plants.
- Note: Although Procambium is a secondary meristematic tissue, in most cases it behaves like a secondary meristematic tissue or its characteristics can be observed, that is, in this case it can be said that it is a type of primary meristematic tissue.

== Uses ==
The cambium of many species of woody plants are edible; however, due to its vital role in the homeostasis and growth of woody plants, this may result in death of the plant if enough cambium is removed at once. The cambium can generally be eaten raw or cooked, and can be ground to flour for use in baking.
