= Laboratory of Tree-Ring Research =

Dendrochronology laboratory in Arizona

- Established: 1937
- Field of research: Tree rings
- Directors: Kevin Anchukaitis; Bryan Black
- Location: 1215 E Lowell St., Tucson, Arizona, 85721-0045, United States; 32.2292032°N 110.9523167°W
- Affiliations: University of Arizona
- Website: ltrr.arizona.edu

The Laboratory of Tree-Ring Research was established in 1937 by A.E. Douglass, founder of the modern science of dendrochronology. The laboratory is a research unit in the College of Science at the University of Arizona in Tucson. Since its founding, visiting scholars and faculty at the lab have done notable work in the areas of climate change, fire history, ecology, archeology and hydrology.
