= Unifacial cambium =

The unifacial cambium (pl. cambia or cambiums) produces cells to the interior of its cylinder. These cells differentiate into xylem tissue. Unlike the more common bifacial cambium found in later woody plants, the unifacial cambium does not produce phloem to its exterior. Also in contrast to the bifacial cambium, the unifacial cambium is unable to expand its circumference with anticlinal cell division. Cell elongation provides a limited amount of expansion.

== Unifacial cambium plant morphology and life cycles ==
The unifacial cambium allowed plants to grow as tall as 50 meters. Lacking secondary phloem, unifacial cambium plants developed alternative strategies to long range nutrient transport. For example, the stems of lycophyte trees were covered in photosynthesizing leaf bases.

Due to the limited capacity for circumference growth, unifacial cambium plants had very little wood compared to modern woody plants. Xylem tissue in unifacial cambium plants was particularly structurally efficient. Additional structural support was provided in lycophytes by a special periderm tissue in the outer cortex.

Lycophyte trees exhibit determinate growth. These trees appear to have lived for most of their life cycle as a 'stump', establishing root networks underground, before shooting up rapidly, releasing spores, and dying shortly thereafter.
