= The Wedding (1972 film) =

Wesele (The Wedding)
- Marek Perepeczko in the film
- Directed by: Andrzej Wajda
- Written by: Stanisław Wyspiański; Andrzej Kijowski(screenplay)
- Produced by: Film Polski, Zespoly Realizatorow Filmowych
- Starring: Daniel Olbrychski; Ewa Ziętek; Andrzej Łapicki; Wojciech Pszoniak; Marek Walczewski; Franciszek Pieczka; Marek Perepeczko
- Cinematography: Witold Sobociński
- Music by: Czesław Niemen
- Release date: 1972
- Running time: 1 hr. 46 min
- Language: Polish

Wesele (The Wedding) is a 1972 Polish film directed by Andrzej Wajda. It was adapted from the 1901 play by the same name by Stanisław Wyspiański.

The plot is set at the wedding of a member of Kraków intelligentsia (the Bridegroom, played by Daniel Olbrychski), and his peasant Bride (played by Ewa Ziętek). Their class-blurring union follows a fashionable trend among friends of the playwright from the modernist Young Poland movement. The play by Wyspiański was based on a real-life event: the wedding of Lucjan Rydel at the St. Mary's Basilica in Kraków and his wedding reception in the village of Bronowice. It was inspired in part also by the modernist painting of Jacek Malczewski and Maksymilian Gierymski. Wajda also directed Wesele for the theatre.

== Plot ==
A poet marries a peasant girl in Kraków. Their wedding reception follows. The celebration of the new marriage moves on from the city to the villager's house. In the rooms adjoining that of the wedding party, guests continually burst into arguments, make love, or simply rest from their merriment, dancing and feasting. Interspersed with the real guests are the well-known figures of Polish history and culture, who represent the guilty consciences of the characters. The two groups gradually begin a series of dialogues. The Poet (played by Andrzej Łapicki) is visited successively by the Black Knight, a symbol of the nation's past military glory; the Journalist (played by Wojciech Pszoniak), then by the court jester and conservative political sage Stańczyk; and the Ghost of Wernyhora (Marek Walczewski), a paradigm of leadership for Poland. Wernyhora presents the Host with a golden horn symbolizing the national mission, and calls the Polish people to a revolt. One of the farm hands is dispatched to sound the horn at each corner of Poland, but he loses the horn soon after.

Wajda's hallucinatory direction adds a layer of complexity to a text already rippling marvelously with tonal shifts. Tragic, farcical, satiric, sacred, sarcastic, noble, challenging, and studded with arresting verse, The Wedding stands as a towering landmark in the history of Polish cinema.

== Cast ==
- Daniel Olbrychski, groom (Lucjan Rydel)
- Ewa Ziętek, bride
- Andrzej Łapicki, poet (Kazimierz Przerwa-Tetmajer)
- Wojciech Pszoniak - journalist (Rudolf Starzewski) and jester Stańczyk
- Franciszek Pieczka – Czepiec, gmina scribe (real person: Błażej Czepiec)
- Marek Walczewski, host (Włodzimierz Tetmajer)
- Izabella Olszewska, hostess
- Maja Komorowska – Rachel
- Marek Perepeczko – Jasiek
- Gabriela Kownacka – Zosia
- Olgierd Łukaszewicz - ghost (Ludwik de Laveaux (painter))
- Bożena Dykiel – Kasia
- Janusz Bukowski – Kasper
- Artur Młodnicki – ghost of Wernyhora
- Wirgiliusz Gryń - vampire in the image of Jakub Szela
- Leszek Piskorz – Staszek
- Czesław Wołłejko – Hetman (Franciszek Ksawery Branicki)
- Mieczysław Voit – Jew, father of Rachel
- Hanna Skarżanka – Klimina
- Małgorzata Lorentowicz – Councilwoman (Antonina Domańska)
- Andrzej Szczepkowski – Nos ("nose", journalist Witold Noskowski)
- Emilia Krakowska – Marysia
- Mieczysław Stoor – Wojtek
- Barbara Wrzesińska – Maryna
- Henryk Borowski – Grandfather
- Kazimierz Opaliński - Father
- Maria Konwicka – Haneczka
- Anna Góralska – Isia
- Mieczysław Czechowicz - Priest
- Wiktor Grotowicz – Ghost accompanying Hetman
- Czesław Niemen – Chochoł (fictional character) (literally straw wrap) (voice)

and

- Kamionka (folk band from Łysa Góra)
- Koronka (folk band from Bobowa)
- Opocznianka (folk band Opoczno)

== Awards ==
- Silver Seashell Award at the San Sebastián International Film Festival.
