= Winter injury =

Umbrella term for damaged trees and plants

Winter injury is an umbrella term to describe injuries to trees and plants caused by winter conditions, including freezing temperatures, snow and ice, and road salt. Winter injury can damage trees and plants through snow or cold conditions that ruin the plant. Winter injuries may prematurely damage the trees and plants, which may have to be replanted or taken care of. Winter injuries can ruin plants and trees, causing them to decay. Winter injury is also the most common cause of frost crack.

== See also ==
- Frost crack
- Sun scald
