= Antonina Domańska =

Polish author (1853–1917)

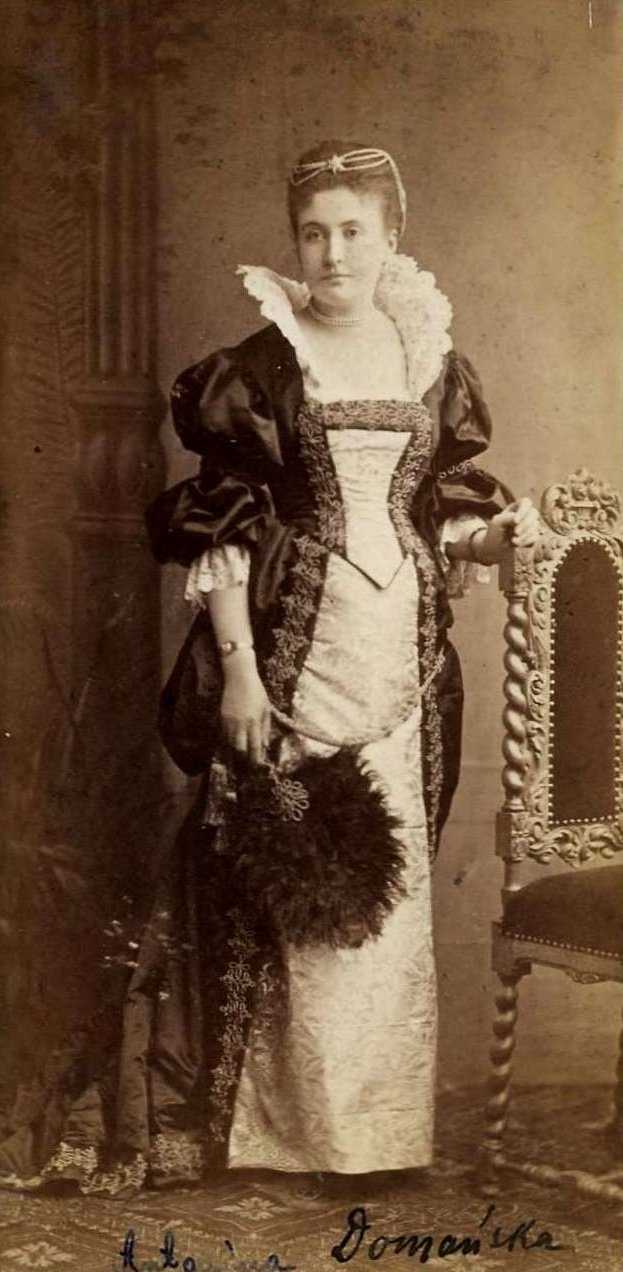
- Born: Antonina Kremer; September 1853; Kamianets-Podilskyi, Russian Empire (now Ukraine)
- Died: 24 January 1917 (aged 63); Kraków
- Known for: Author of children’s books; philanthropic work in Kraków
- Works: Historia żółtej ciżemki (The Story of the Yellow Boot); Paziowie króla Zygmunta (King Zygmunt's Pages)
- Spouse: Stanisław Domański

Antonina Domańska (1853–1917) was a Polish writer of historical novels and short stories for children. Her works recreated the customs, characters and history of the First Polish Republic.

== Early life ==
Domańska was born in September 1853 in Kamianets-Podilskyi when that town belonged to the Russian Empire. It is now part of Ukraine. Her grandfather had Czech and German roots and settled with his German wife and family in Kraków in Poland, amassing a fortune and sending his three sons to universities overseas. Her father, Aleksander Kremer, studied medicine at the Jagiellonian University in Kraków and later in several European cities, and then became a school doctor and a private medical practitioner in Kamianets-Podilskyi. He married Modesta Płońska (1815 – 1889), and they had two daughters: Maria and Antonina. After the January Uprising against the Russian Empire, which the family had actively supported, they were forced to leave Kamianets-Podilskyi, returning to Kraków in 1865, where her father was to become a city councillor, serving for 35 years.

Domańska was the niece of art historian Józef Kremer and the aunt of poet and playwright Lucjan Rydel. She studied in a private boarding school. After graduating in 1874, she married Stanisław Domański, a doctor, later a neurologist and professor at the Jagiellonian University. They had five children, two of whom died early. Initially, they lived in the Domański family house until, in 1896, they settled in a large house in the town of Rudawa, about 20 km from Kraków, in a street that is today named after her.

== Literary career ==
Persuaded to start writing by Rydel, Domańska began her literary career with short stories based on observations of her own children. She made her debut in the pages of Wieczory Rodzinne in 1890 with the story Moje dzieci (My children) under the pseudonym of A.DO.. By the second decade of the 20th century she had gained great popularity as an author of novels and historical short stories for children. She is most famous for her Historia zielonyj ciżemki (Story of the Yellow Boot), which was focused around the main altar carved for the Kraków parish church. The book was until recently required reading for schoolchildren and in 1961 was filmed by Sylwester Chęciński. Another popular novel, Paziowie król Zygmunta (King Sigismund's Pages), was turned into a television series for children.

Opinions about her during her life were not uniform. She was known for her talkativeness, bluntness of speech and uncouth language, while also being recognised for her cheerful disposition, beauty, and sharp intelligence. Her character was featured in the 1972 film The Wedding, which was based on a 1902 play by Stanisław Wyspiański that was inspired by the wedding of Lucjan Rydel. Apart from her writing and social life in Kraków's intellectual circles, she devoted time to charitable and social activities in the city's care institutions.

== Awards and recognition ==
=== Awards ===
- 1913: St. Wojciech Printing and Publishing House Award for a historical novel for children for the novel Krysia bezimienia.
- 1914: Bolesław Prus Award for a historical novel for children.

=== Recognition ===
In 2014–2015, one hundred of the benches in Planty Park in Kraków had a name plate added to them of an author who either came from or in some cases was closely connected with Kraków. This was one of the activities associated with the Kraków UNESCO City of Literature celebrations of 2014. Domańska was one of those recognised.

On the centenary of her death, in 2017, the Kraków Library created the Żółta Ciżemka (Yellow Boots) Literary Award for the best book for children and young people. The award is for authors throughout Poland and is funded by the City of Krakow.

== Death ==
Domańska died of tuberculosis on 24 January 1917 in Kraków. The funeral took place two days later. She was buried in the Rakowicki Cemetery in Kraków in the Domański family tomb.

== Books ==
Domańska's books were:

- W Wola Tenczyńskiej, (In Wola Tenczyńskiej), 1899
- Hanusia Wierzynkówna, 1909
- Historia żółtej ciżemki (The Story of the Yellow Boot), 1913; required reading for grades 4 and 5 of primary school.
- Paziowie króla Zygmunta (King Zygmunt's Pages), 1910; the basis for a 1989 feature film for children directed by Grzegorz Warchoł
- Przy kominku (By the Fireplace), 1911; a collection of fairy tales
- Trzaska and Zbroja, 1913
- Krysia Bezimienna (Krysia the Nameless), 1913
- Królewska zadola (The Royal Estate), 1916
- Złota przędza (Golden Yarn), 1918; short stories
- Kuglarz Matki Boskiej (The Juggler of the Virgin Mary), 1920
