= Cork cambium =

Part of a plant

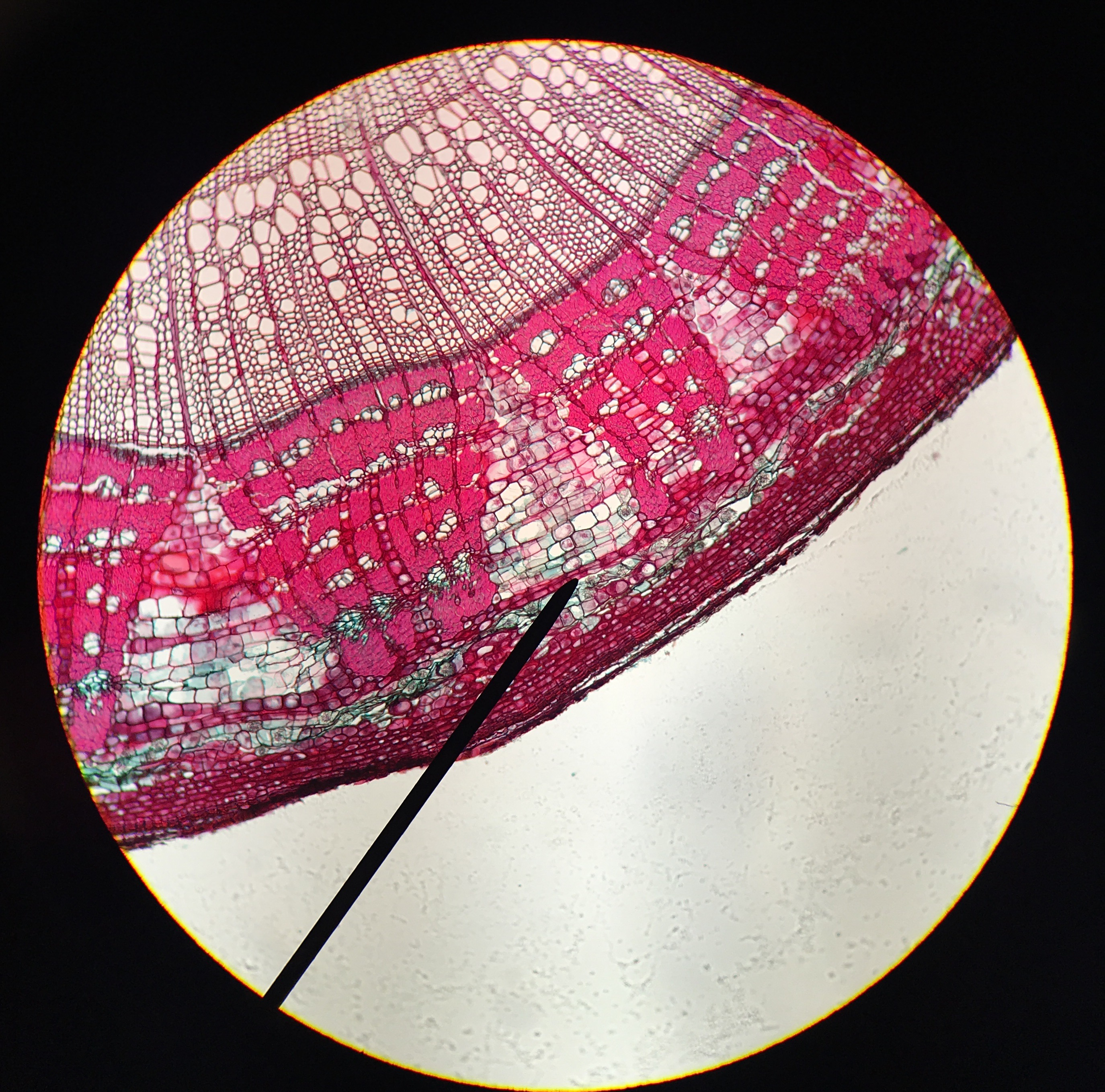
Cork cambium of woody stem (Tilia). It is different from the main vascular cambium, which is the ring between the wood (xylem) on the inside (top) and the red bast (phloem) outside it.

Cork cambium (pl.: cambia or cambiums) is a tissue found in many vascular plants as a part of the periderm. It is one of the many layers of bark. It exists between the cork and the phelloderm. The cork cambium is a lateral meristem and is responsible for secondary growth that replaces the epidermis in roots and stems. It is found in woody and many herbaceous dicots, gymnosperms and some monocots (monocots usually lack secondary growth). It is one of the plant's meristems – the series of tissues consisting of embryonic disk (incompletely differentiated) cells from which the plant grows. The function of cork cambium is to produce the cork, a tough protective material.

Synonyms for cork cambium are bark cambium, peri-cambium and phellogen. Phellogen is defined as the meristematic cell layer responsible for the development of the periderm. Cells that grow inwards from there are termed phelloderm, and cells that develop outwards are termed phellem or cork (note similarity with vascular cambium). The periderm thus consists of three different layers:

- phelloderm – inside of cork cambium; composed of living parenchyma cells.
- phellogen (cork cambium) – meristem that gives rise to periderm.
- phellem (cork) – dead at maturity; air-filled, quite variable between different species, and is also highly dependent on age and growth conditions as can be observed from the different surfaces of bark, which may be smooth, fissured, tesselated, scaly, or flaking off.

== Economic importance ==
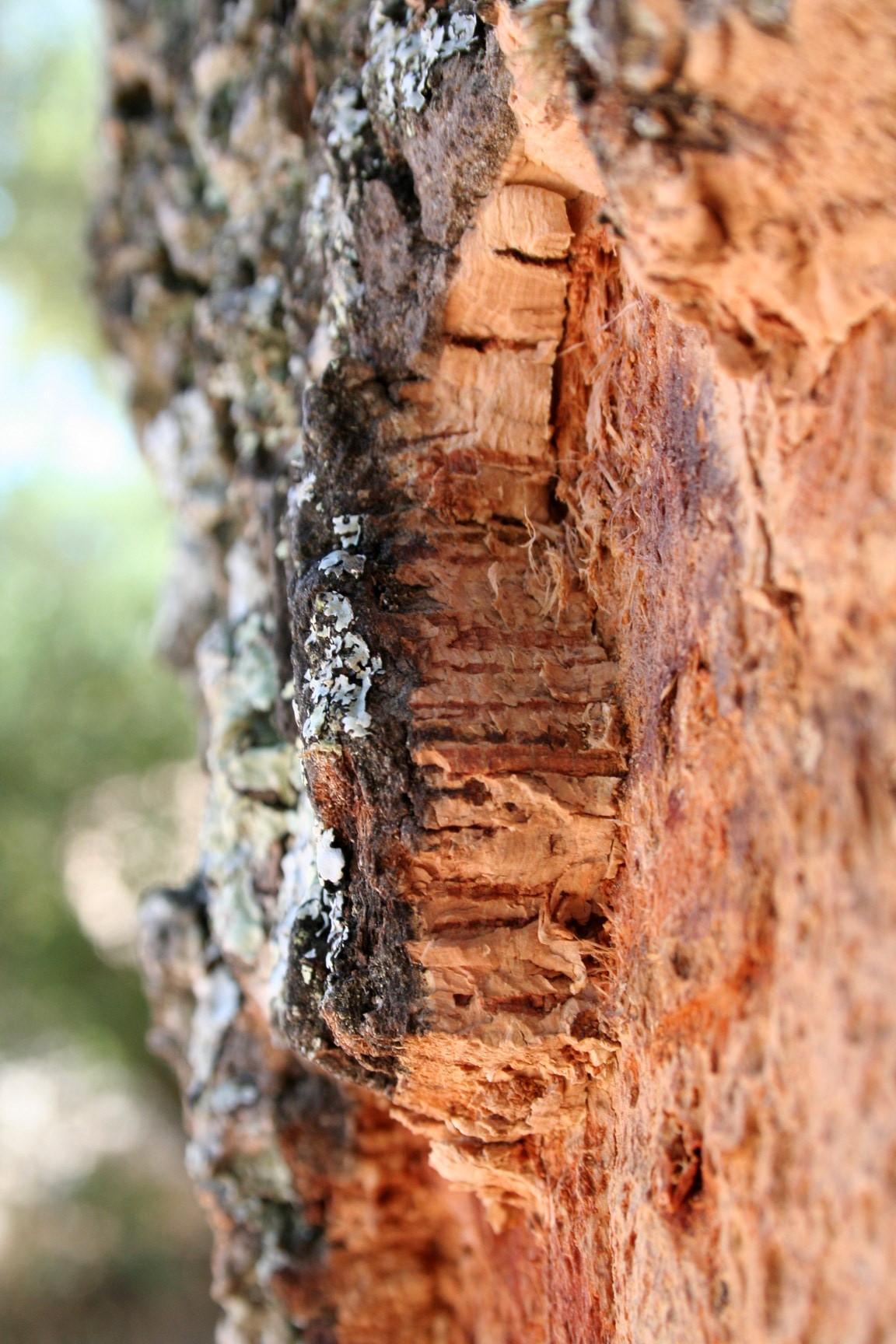
Quercus suber (cork oak) bark, Portugal

Commercial cork is derived from the bark of the cork oak (Quercus suber). Cork has many uses including wine bottle stoppers, bulletin boards, coasters, hot pads to protect tables from hot pans, insulation, sealing for lids, flooring, gaskets for engines, fishing bobbers, handles for fishing rods and tennis rackets, etc. It is also a high strength-to-weight/cost ablative material for aerodynamic prototypes in wind tunnels, as well as satellite launch vehicle payload fairings, reentry surfaces, and compression joints in thrust-vectored solid rocket motor nozzles.

Many types of bark are used as mulch.

== See also ==
- Complementary cells
- Frost crack
- Sun scald (flora)
