= Lenticel =

Tissue that allows gas exchange in plant organs

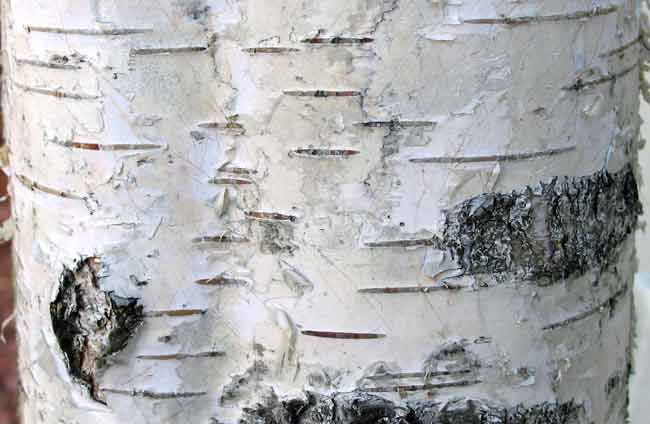
The dark horizontal lines on silver birch bark are the lenticels.

A lenticel is a porous tissue consisting of cells with large intercellular spaces in the periderm of the secondarily thickened organs and the bark of woody stems and roots of gymnosperms and dicotyledonous flowering plants. It functions as a pore, providing a pathway for the direct exchange of gases between the internal tissues and atmosphere through the bark, which is otherwise impermeable to gases. The name lenticel, pronounced with an [s], derives from its lenticular (lens-like) shape. The shape of lenticels is one of the characteristics used for tree identification.

== Evolution ==
Before there was much evidence for the existence and functionality of lenticels, the fossil record has shown the first primary mechanism of aeration in early vascular plants to be the stomata.

However, in woody plants, while the respiratory function of stomata is retained in the living epidermis of leaves and green stems, that function is lost where the epidermis of trunks and branches is displaced by vascular and cork cambial activity and by secondary growth. In such parts the entire epidermis may be shed as it is replaced by a suberized periderm or bark in which the respiratory functions of the stomata may be replaced by lenticels, at least until the bark becomes too thick.

The extinct arboreal plants of the genera Lepidodendron and Sigillaria were the first to have distinct aeration structures that rendered these modifications. "Parichnoi" (singular: parichnos) are canal-like structures that, in association with foliar traces of the stem, connected the stem's outer and middle cortex to the mesophyll of the leaf. Parichnoi were thought to eventually give rise to lenticels as they helped solve the issue of long-range oxygen transport in these woody plants during the Carboniferous period. They also acquired secondary connections as they evolved to become transversely elongated to efficiently aerate the maximum number of vertical rays as well as the central core tissue of the stem. The evolutionary significance of parichnoi was their functionality in the absence of cauline stomata, where they can also be affected and destroyed by pressure similar to what can damage to stomatal tissue. Evidently, in both conifers and Lepidodendroids, the parichnoi, as the primary lenticular structure, appear as paired structures on either side of leaf scars. The development and increase in the number of these primitive lenticels were key to providing a system that was open for aeration and gas exchange in these plants.

== Structure and development ==
In plant bodies that produce secondary growth, lenticels promote gas exchange of oxygen, carbon dioxide, and water vapor. Lenticel formation usually begins beneath stomatal complexes during primary growth preceding the development of the first periderm. The formation of lenticels seems to be directly related to the growth and strength of the shoot and on the hydrous of the tissue, which refers to the internal moisture. As stems and roots mature lenticel development continues in the new periderm (for example, periderm that forms at the bottom of cracks in the bark).

Lenticels are found as raised circular, oval, or elongated areas on stems and roots. In woody plants, lenticels commonly appear as rough, cork-like structures on young branches. Underneath them, porous tissue creates a number of large intercellular spaces between cells. This tissue fills the lenticel and arises from cell division in the phellogen or substomatal ground tissue. Discoloration of lenticels may also occur, such as in mangoes, that may be due to the amount of lignin in cell walls.

In oxygen deprived conditions, making respiration a daily challenge, different species may possess specialized structures where lenticels can be found. For example, in a common mangrove species, lenticels appear on pneumatophores (specialized roots), where the parenchyma cells that connect to the aerenchyma structure increase in size and go through cell division. In contrast, lenticels in grapes are located on the pedicels and act as a function of temperature. If they are blocked, hypoxia and successive ethanol accumulation may result and lead to cell death.

== Fruits ==
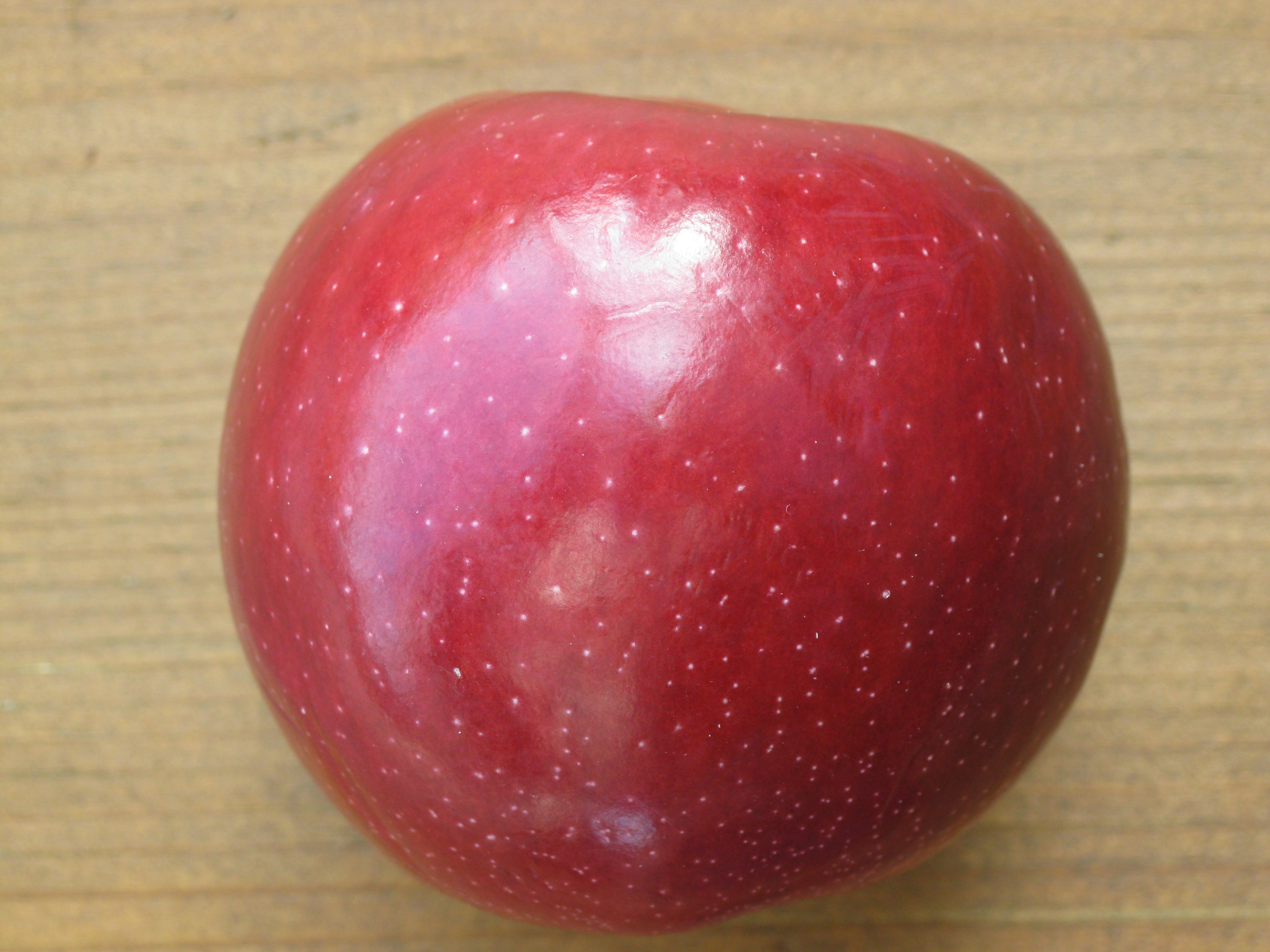
Visible lenticels on an Empire apple.

Lenticels are also present on many fruits, quite noticeably on many apples and pears. On European pears, they can serve as an indicator of when to pick the fruit, as light lenticels on the immature fruit darken and become brown and shallow from the formation of cork cells. Certain bacterial and fungal infections can penetrate fruits through their lenticels, with susceptibility sometimes increasing with its age.

While the term lenticel is usually associated with the breakage of periderm tissue that is associated with gas exchange, it also refers to the lightly colored spots found on apples (a type of pomaceous fruit). "Lenticel" seems to be the most appropriate term to describe both structures mentioned in light of their similar function in gas exchange. Pome lenticels can be derived from no longer functioning stomata, epidermal breaks from the removal of trichomes, and other epidermal breaks that usually occur in the early development of young pomaceous fruits. The closing of pomaceous lenticels can arise when the cuticle over the stomata opening or the substomatal layer seals. Closing can also begin if the substomatal cells become suberized, like cork. The number of lenticels usually varies between the species of apples, where the range may be from 450 to 800 or from 1500 to 2500 in Winesap and Spitzenburg apples, respectively. This wide range may be due to the water availability during the early stages of development of each apple type.

"Lenticel breakdown" is a global skin disorder of apples in which lenticels develop dark 1–8 mm diameter pits shortly after processing and packing. It is most common on the Gala variety, particularly a sport called the Royal Gala, and also in the Fuji, Granny Smith, Golden Delicious, and Red Delicious varieties. It is more common in arid regions, and is thought to be related to relative humidity and temperature. The effect can be mitigated by spraying the fruit with lipophilic coatings prior to harvest.

== Tubers ==
Lenticels are also present on potato tubers.

== Gallery ==
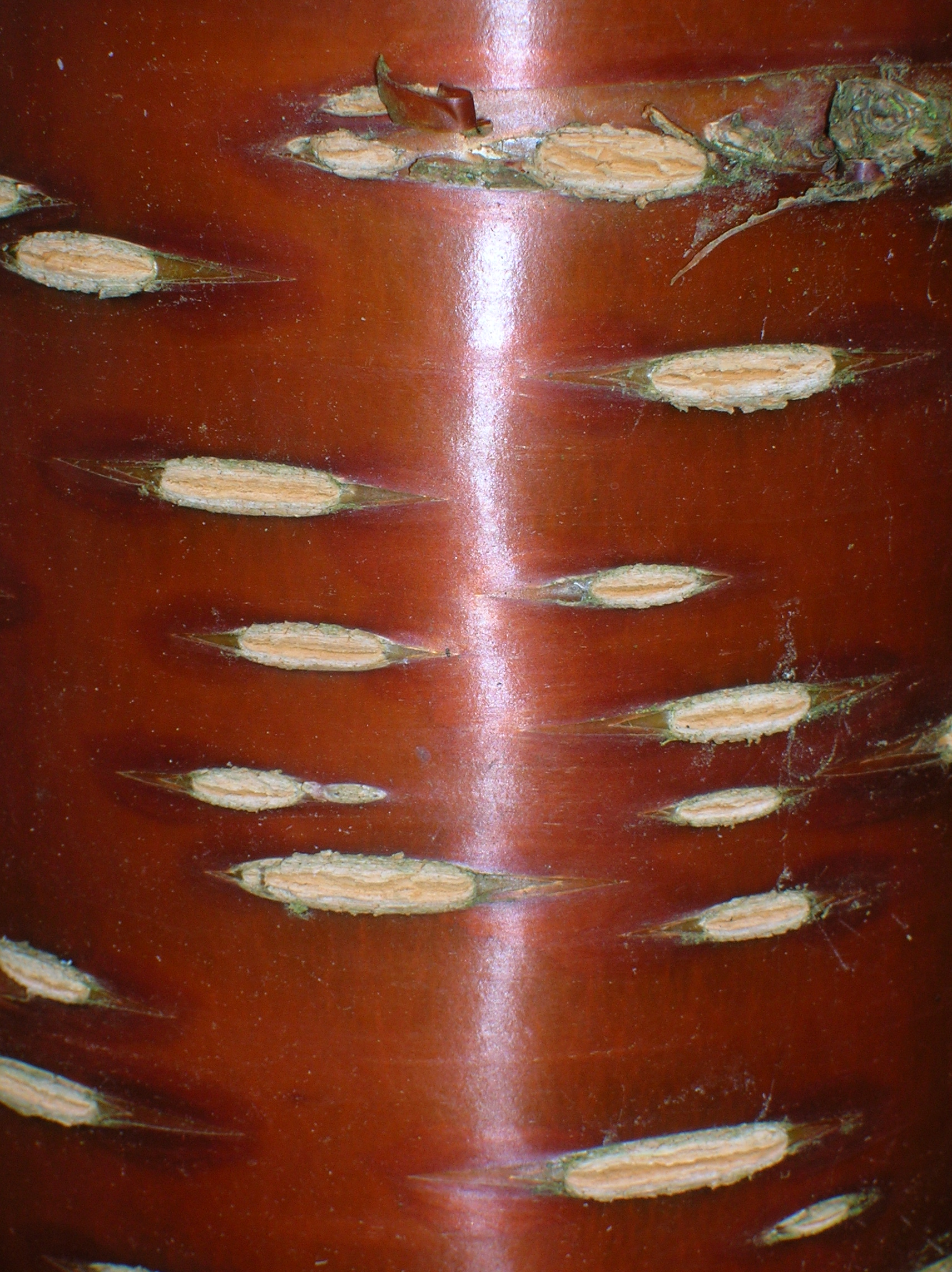
Lenticels on Prunus serrula

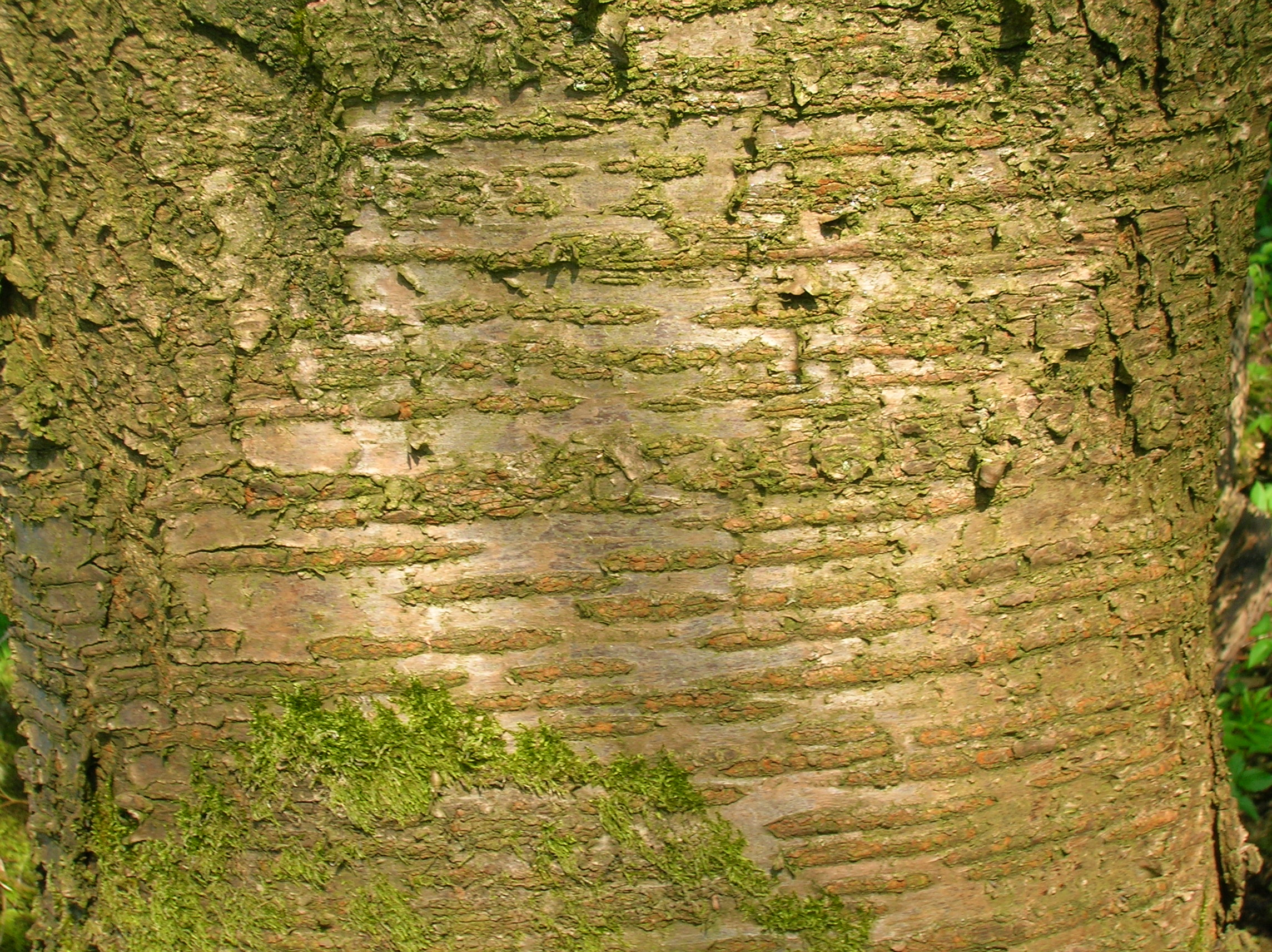
Lenticels on wild cherry or gean

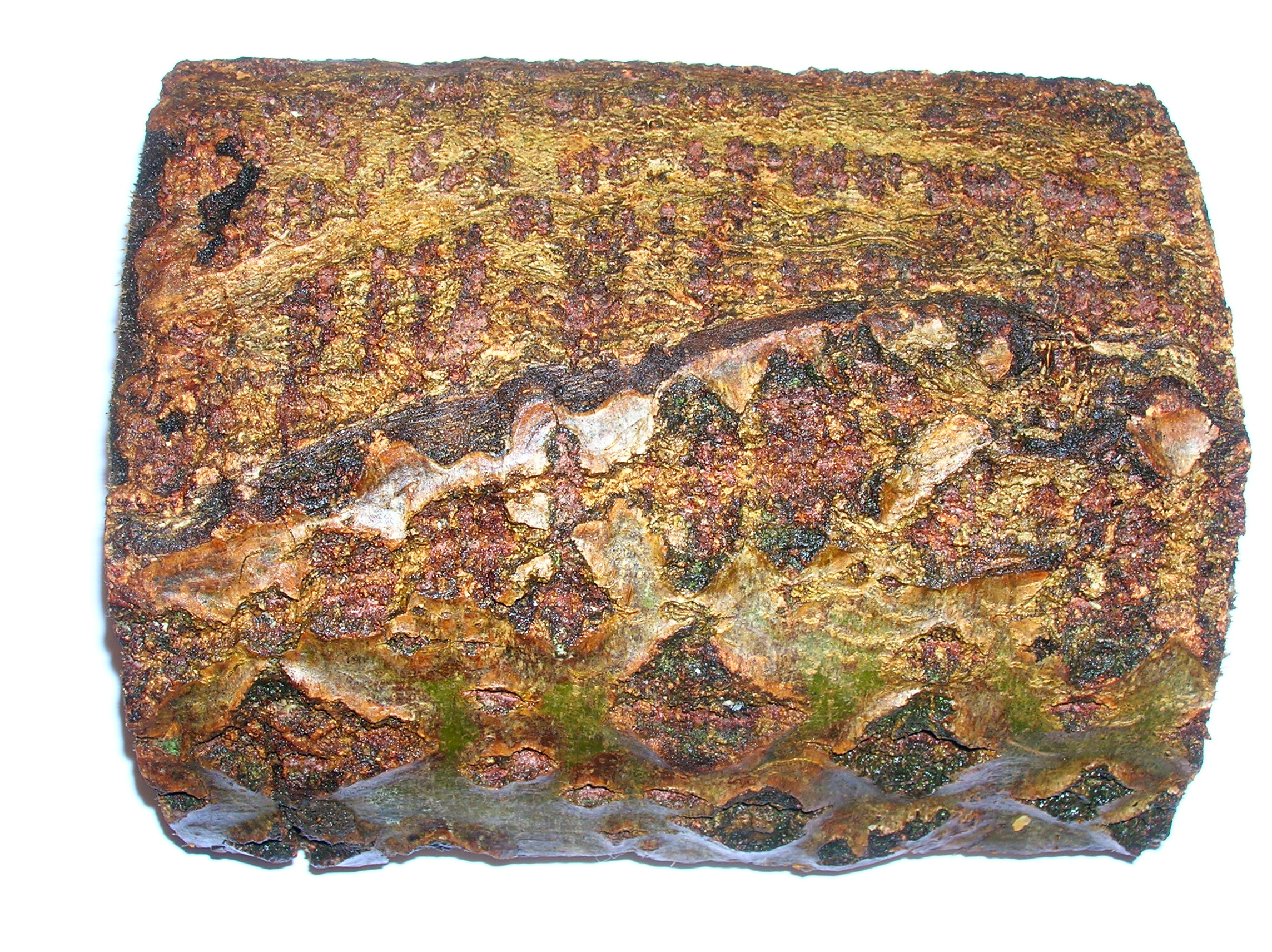
Alder bark (Alnus glutinosa) with characteristic lenticels and abnormal lenticels on callused areas

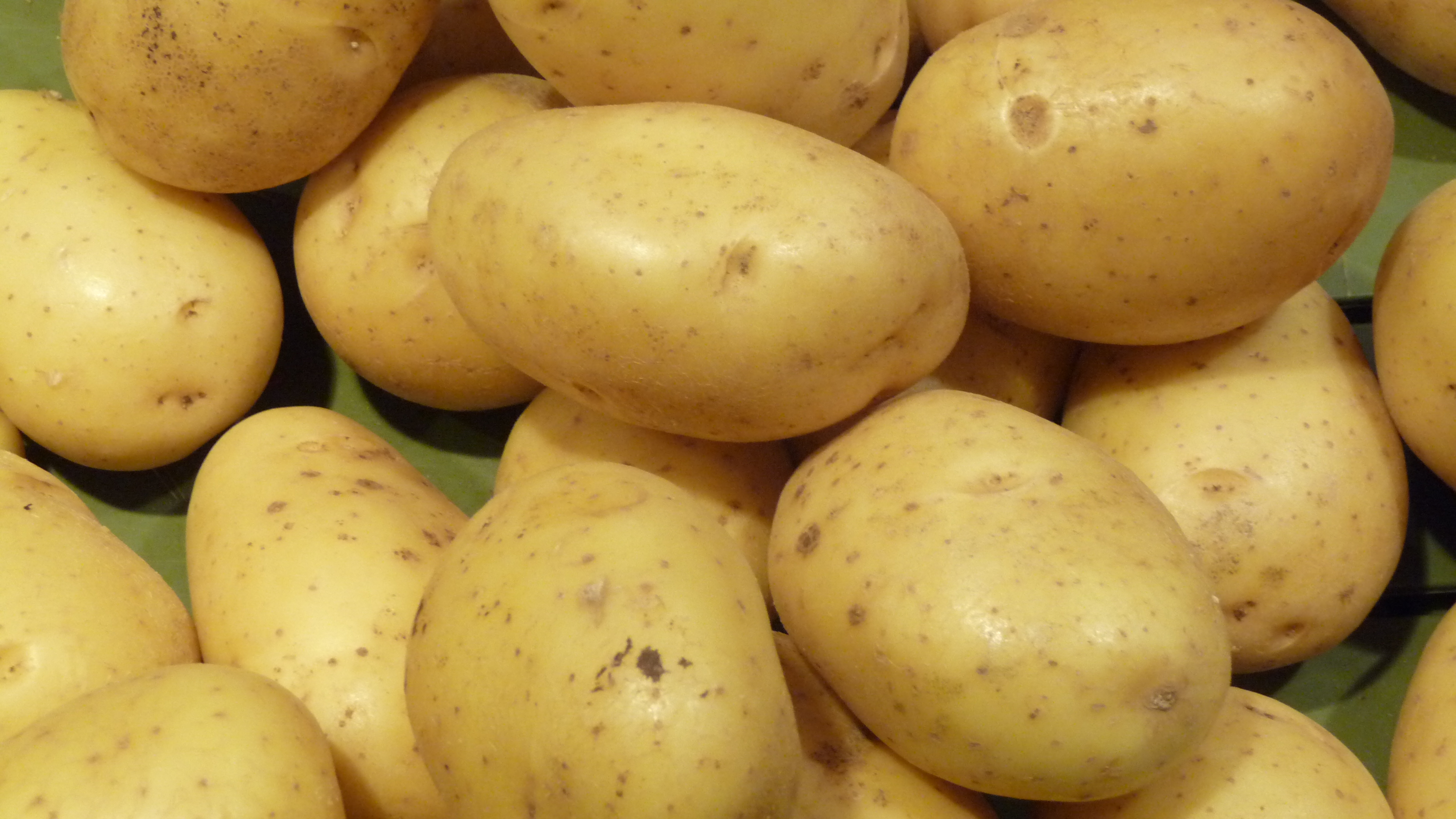
Lenticels on potatoes of the Monalisa variety

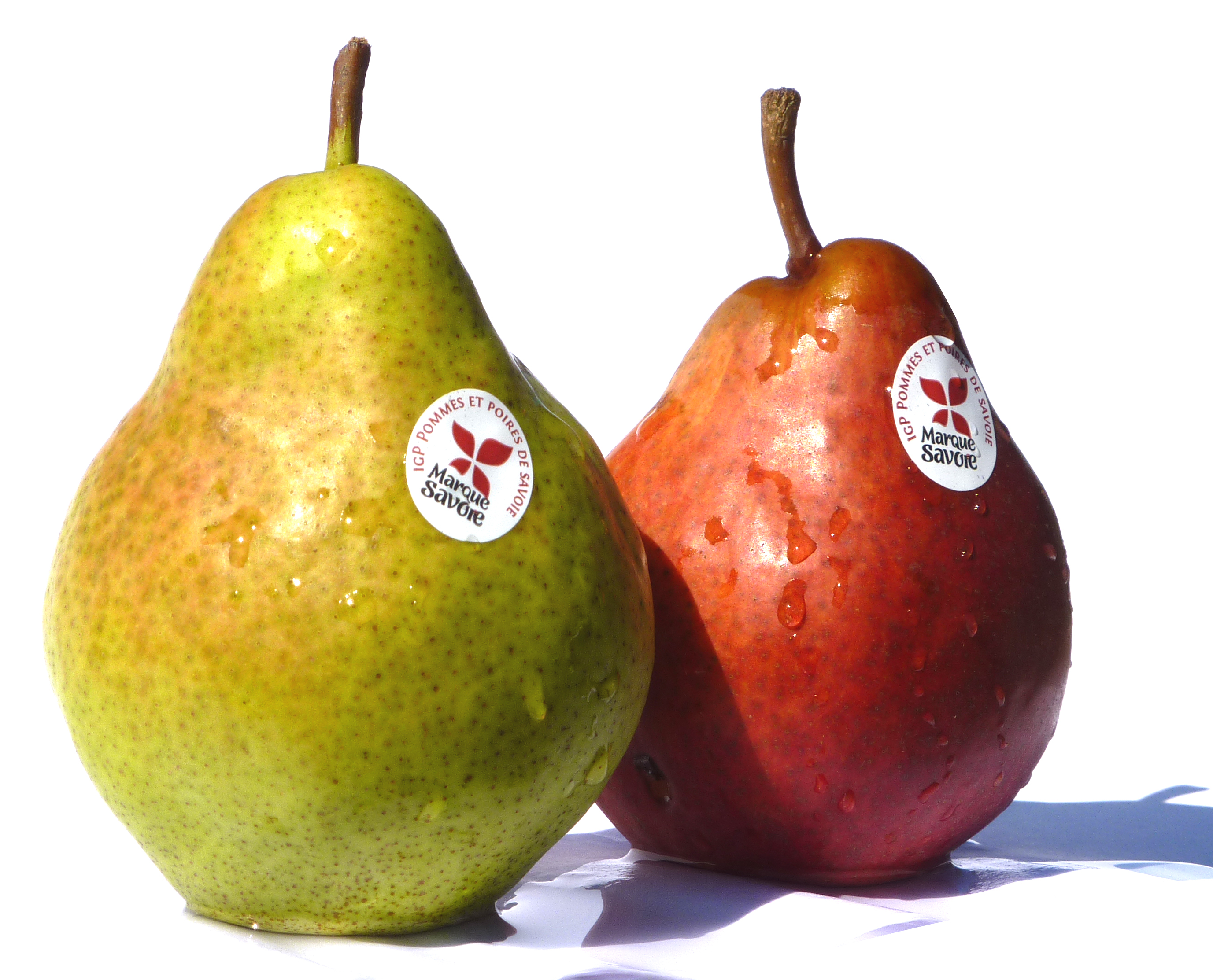
Lenticels on Williams pear varieties

== See also ==
- Complementary cells
