= The Wedding (1901 play) =

Polish drama by Stanisław Wyspiański

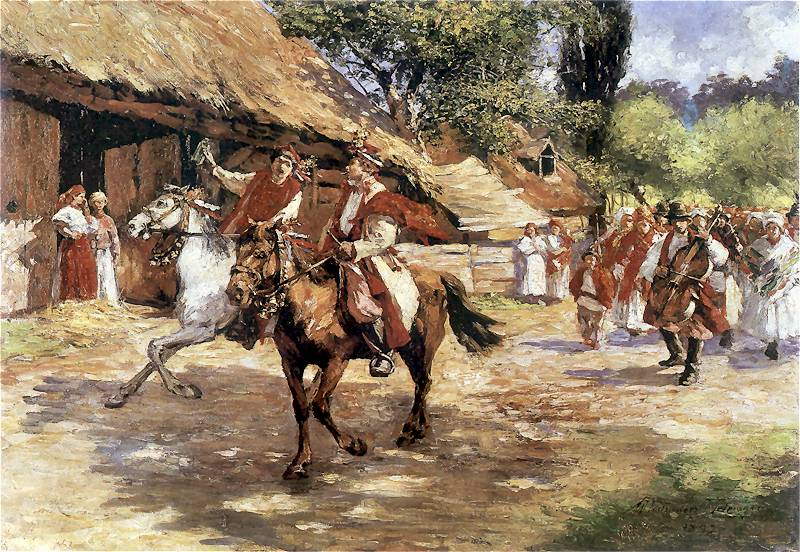
Wesele by Włodzimierz Tetmajer

The Wedding (Polish: Wesele) is a leading Polish drama written in 1901 by the modernist Young Poland playwright, painter, and poet Stanisław Wyspiański. The play limns the vicissitudes of Polish aspirations for national self-determination in the aftermath of two disastrous uprisings against one of Poland's three partitioning powers, the Russian Empire, which began in November 1830 and January 1863.

The play's action takes place at the wedding of a member of the Kraków intelligentsia (the Bridegroom) and his peasant Bride. Their crossclass union follows a then fashionable trend of chłopomania ("peasant-mania") among some Polish intelligentsia, who were often scions of the historic Polish szlachta (nobility).

Wyspiański's play was inspired by a real-life event: the wedding of the poet and playwright Lucjan Rydel at St. Mary's Basilica in Kraków, followed by their wedding reception at the village of Bronowice, now a district of Kraków.

== Plot ==
A poet marries a peasant girl. A wedding reception follows at the bride's village house. In adjoining rooms, guests get into arguments, make love, or rest from their merriment, dancing, and feasting.

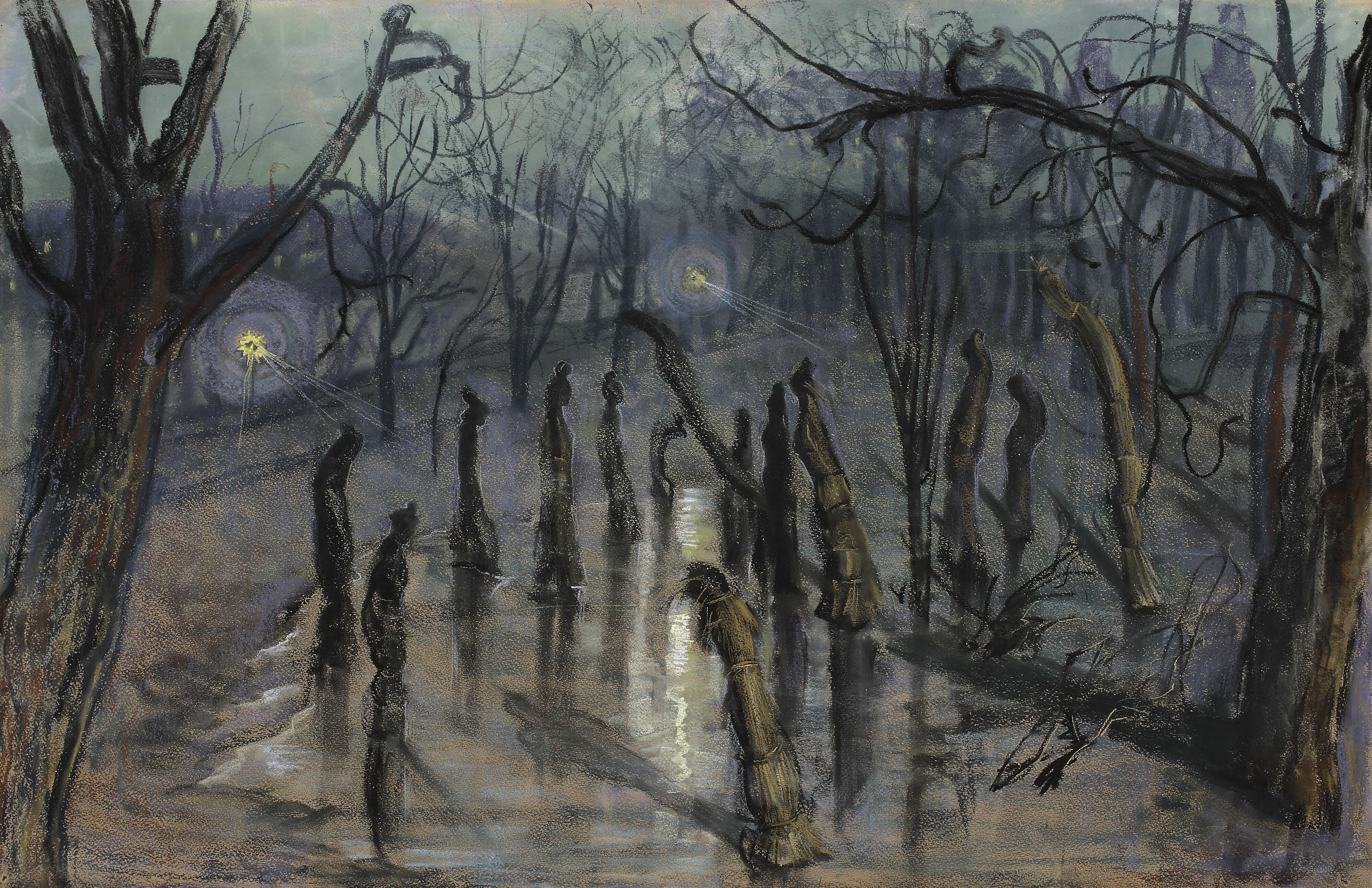
Straw-wraps, by Stanisław Wyspiański

Among the live guests are ghosts of personae from Polish history and culture, representing the guilty consciences of the living. The two groups engage in dialogues. The wedding guests are hypnotized by a rosebush straw-wrap (Chochoł) from the garden which comes to life and joins the party. (Offending a chochoł, according to folk beliefs, could provoke the thing to play tricks). The "Poet" is visited successively by the "Black Knight" (a symbol of the nation's past military glory); the "Journalist"; the court jester Stańczyk, a conservative political sage; and the "Ghost of Wernyhora" (a paradigm of leadership for Poland).

Wernyhora presents the Host with a golden horn symbolizing the national mission, and calls on the Polish people to revolt. A farm hand is dispatched to sound the horn at each corner of Poland, but he soon loses the horn. Thus the wedding guests, symbolizing the nation, waste their chance at national freedom. They keep on dancing a "chocholi taniec" (a "straw-wrap's dance") "the way it's played for them" (a Polish folk saying), failing in their mission.

== Legacy ==
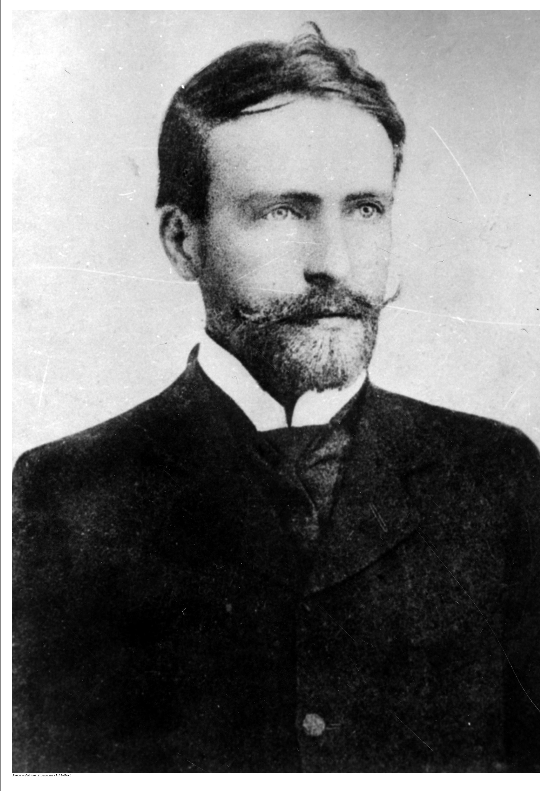
Stanisław Wyspiański

The Wedding, a leading Polish drama written at the turn of the 20th century, and staged many times, has been very influential in Polish culture. In 1972 it was made into a film of the same title by the award-winning Polish film director, Andrzej Wajda.

The Wedding is considered the last great classic of Polish drama. Rochelle Heller Stone writes that it "alone [has] earned [Wyspiański] the title of fourth bard" - the fourth most important figure in Polish poetry, after Adam Mickiewicz, Juliusz Słowacki, and Zygmunt Krasiński.

The 2004 film The Wedding, by Wojciech Smarzowski, also relates to The Wedding.

== See also ==
- Young Poland
- Theatre of Poland
