= Ewa Ziętek =

Polish actress (born 1953)

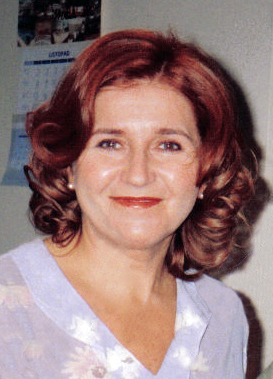
- Born: 8 March 1953 (age 73); Stalinogród, Polish People's Republic
- Years active: 1971 - present

Ewa Ziętek (born 8 March 1953) is a Polish actress. She has made over 50 appearances in film and television.

== Filmography ==
- Trzeba zabić tę miłość (1972) as nurse
- The Wedding (1972) as bride
- What Will You Do When You Catch Me? (1978) as Danusia

Source.
