= Complementary cells =

Complementary cells are a mass of cells in plants, formed from the cork cambium at the position of the lenticels. It is a group of loosely arranged cells that aid in gaseous exchange through cork.
