= Exploding tree =

Natural phenomenon that occurs in trees

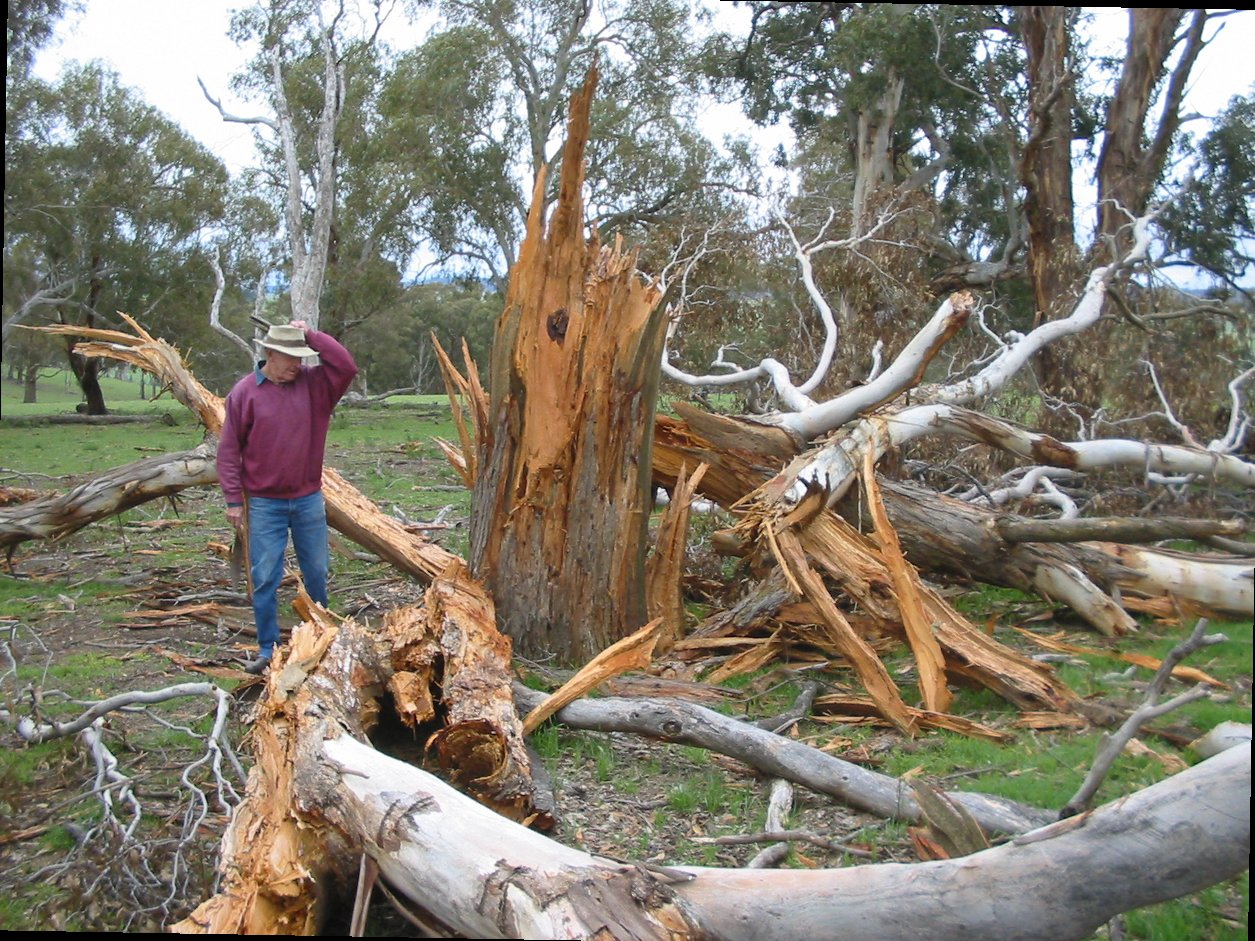
A tree trunk that exploded after being hit by lightning

A tree may explode when stresses in its trunk increase due to extreme cold, heat, or lightning, causing it to split suddenly.

== Causes ==
=== Cold ===
Cold weather will cause some trees to shatter by freezing the sap, because it contains water, which expands as it freezes, putting pressure on the bark until it snaps creating a sound like a gunshot. The sound is produced as the tree bark splits, with the wood contracting as the sap expands. John Claudius Loudon described this effect of cold on trees in his Encyclopaedia of Gardening, in the entry for frosts, as follows:^{1}

The history of frosts furnishes very extraordinary facts. The trees are often scorched and burnt up, as with the most excessive heat, in consequence of the separation of water from the air, which is therefore very drying. In the great frost in 1683, the trunks of oak, ash, walnut, and other trees, were miserably split and cleft, so that they might be seen through, and the cracks often attended with dreadful noises like the explosion of fire-arms. In the frost of 1837–8 large bushes of heath had their stems split by the frost into shreds, and the wood of the evergreen oak and that of the sweet bay was cracked and split in a similar manner.

— John Claudius Loudon, Encyclopaedia of Gardening

Henry Ward Beecher records anecdotal evidence of the wood from which instrument cases and carrying boxes were splitting in temperatures of −70 °F (−57 °C) in Captain Bach's travels near the Great Slave Lake. Linda Runyon, author of books on wilderness living, recounts her experience of the effect of cold on maple trees as follows:

I was relaxing in front of a fire in the crispness of early morning when Crack! A sound like an explosion came from behind me in the woods. I scanned the trees and saw that a maple tree had "exploded". The explosion caused a big crack in the tree about three feet high. When a winter wind stirs the frozen trees, they sometimes appear to burst vertically. When it was 40 degrees below zero at night, I lay awake and listened to the trees explode. That's a true wilderness thermometer!

— Linda Runyon, The Essential Wild Food Survival Guide

Wally and Shirley Loudon reported the effect of the freeze of December 1968 upon their orchard in Carlton, Washington as follows:

We saw 47 below on our porch, and we didn't look again. I would hear these bangs and I blamed it on the house expanding or contracting, or whatever, from the cold, but it was the trees exploding. It was the bark bursting, and you could hear it. That's how wild it was.

— Shirley Loudon, "Freezes are becoming a distant memory", Good Fruit Grower

To the Sioux of The Dakotas and the Cree, the first new moon of the new year is known, in various dialects, as the "Moon of the Cold-Exploding Trees".

Tree sap is a supercooled liquid in cold temperatures. John Hunter observed, in his Treatise on the Blood, that tree sap within a tree freezes some 17 degrees Fahrenheit below its nominal freezing point.

In the Ainu language, the phenomenon of tree trunks bursting as a result of the water inside freezing is called nipusfum (ニプシフム).

=== Lightning ===
Trees can explode when struck by lightning. The strong electric current is carried mostly by the water-conducting sapwood below the bark, heating it up and boiling the water. The pressure of the steam can make the trunk burst. This happens especially with trees whose trunks are already dying or rotting. The more usual result of lightning striking a tree, however, is a lightning scar, running down the bark, or simply root damage, whose only visible sign above ground is branches that were fed by the root dying back.

=== Fire ===
Exploding trees also occur during forest fires and are a risk to smokejumpers.

Eucalyptus trees are known to explode during bush fires due to vaporised eucalyptus oils producing an explosive mixture with air.

Explosive behaviour of Eucalyptus trunks has been observed in both laboratory tests and in wildfires in Australia.

Aspen trees have also been observed to explode in wildfires.

Steam pressure build up in tree trunks is theoretically unlikely to lead to an explosion in a rapidly moving fire front, although trees exploding after the initial front has passed or exploding through other mechanisms is entirely possible.

== April Fools' Day hoax ==
Exploding trees were the subject of a 2005 April Fools' Day hoax in the United States, covered by National Public Radio, stating that maple trees in New England had been exploding due to a failure to collect their sap, causing pressure to build from the inside. The root pressure in a maple tree is approximately 0.1 MPa, one standard atmosphere, which is insufficient to cause a tree to explode.

== See also ==
- Frost crack
- Sandbox tree (Hura crepitans), also known as the "dynamite tree"

== Footnotes ==
- ^1 Similar text can be found in the entry for Frost in Charles Hutton's 1795 Mathematical and Philosophical Dictionary
