= Wernyhora =

Legendary Cossack bandurist

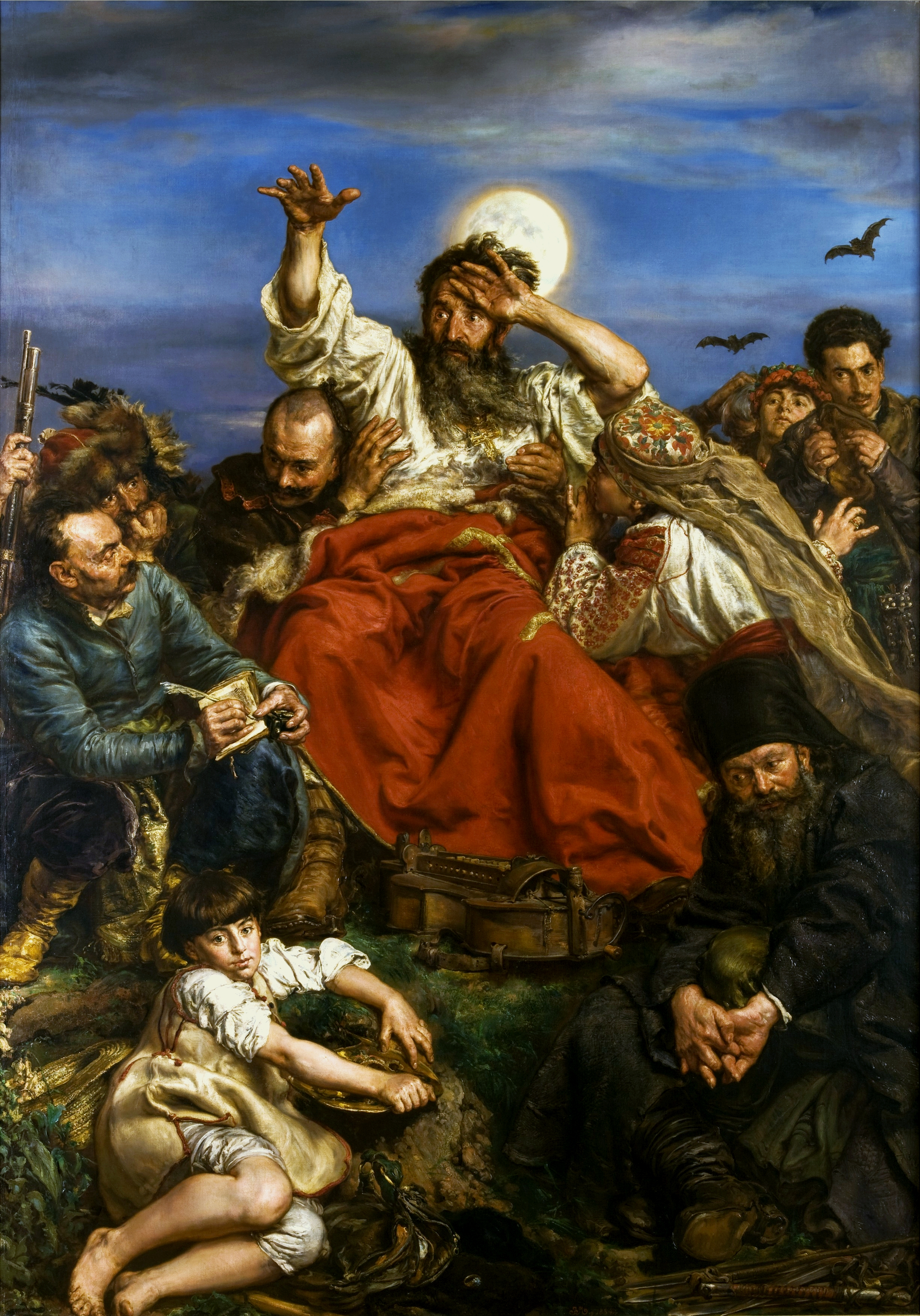
Wernyhora; a painting by Jan Matejko

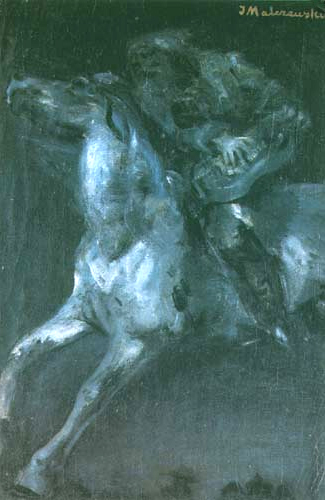
Wernyhora; a painting by Jacek Malczewski

Wernyhora is a legendary 18th century Cossack bard (bandurist) who prophesied the fall of Poland and its subsequent rebirth and flourishing, "from Black to White sea".

He has been a subject of several folklore tales and poems (particularly in the 19th century romanticism in Poland). He often comes up in reference to the Ukrainian peasant uprising Koliivshchyna. Most notably he has been a character in works of Seweryn Goszczyński (Vernyhora), Michał Czajkowski (Wernyhora wieszcz ukraiński: powieść historyczna z roku 1768 (1838)), Juliusz Słowacki (Salomea's Silver Dream) and Stanisław Wyspiański (The Wedding), as well as a subject of a paintings by Jan Matejko and Jacek Malczewski.
