= Tree wrap =

Wrap to protect trees from weather conditions

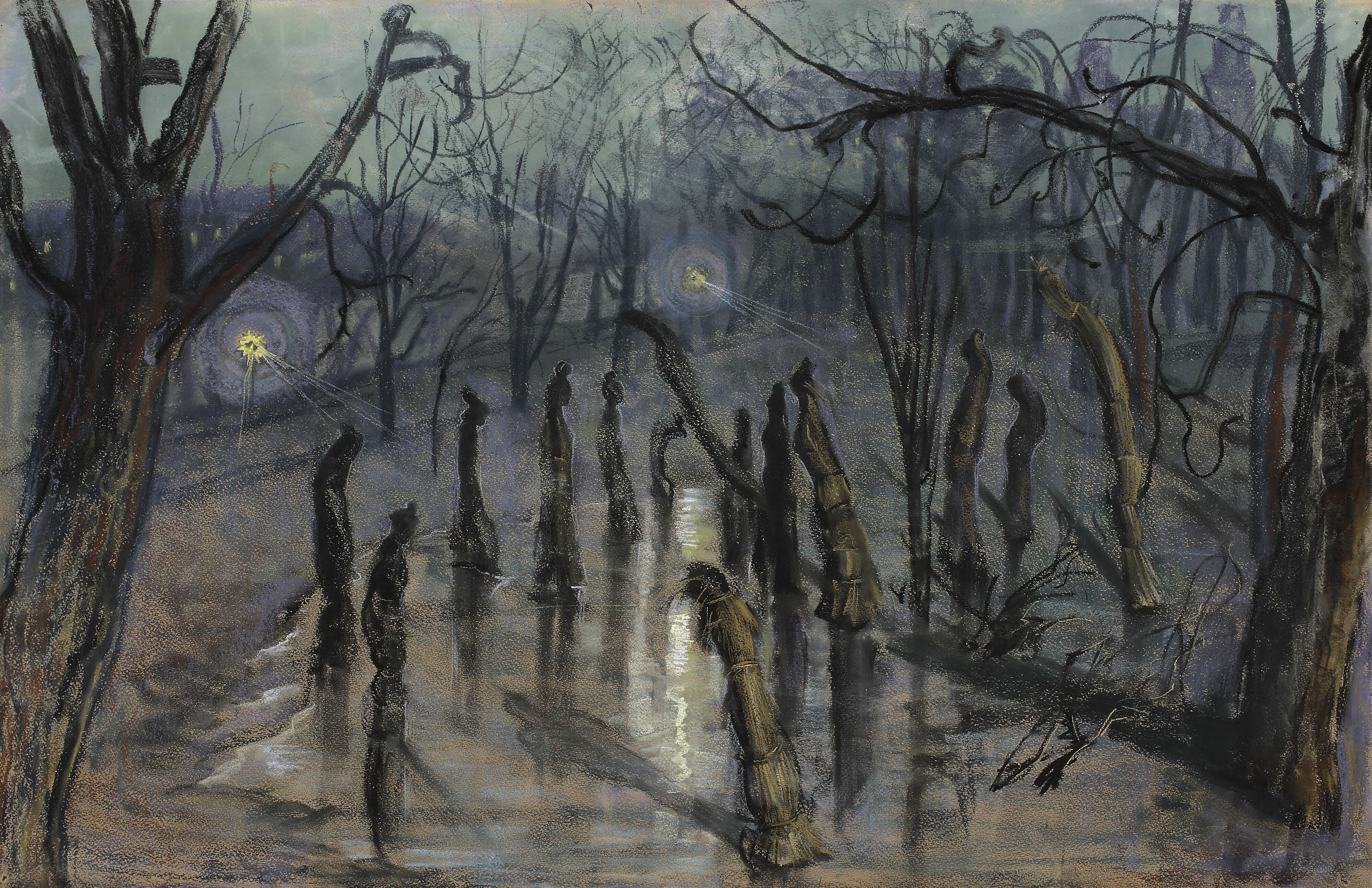
Chochoły (Straw-Wraps), by Stanisław Wyspiański

A tree wrap or tree wrapping is a wrap for garden tree saplings, roses, and other delicate plants to protect them from frost damage (e.g. frost cracks or complete death). In the past it was made of straw (straw wrap). Now there are commercial tree wrap materials, such as crepe paper or burlap tapes. Tree wrapping is also used to protect saplings from sunscald and drying of the bark. A disadvantage of tape wrapping is dampness under the wrapping during rainy seasons.

== Usage ==
The color and material of the tree wrap has been found to change its efficacy. Tree wrap that protects against intense temperatures helps prevent sunburn and sunscald: “Sunburn is considered a high-temperature injury, [and] winter sunscald is a low-temperature injury.” Insulating materials like fabric can help retain heat while light-colored fabric like white fiber wrap can reflect sunlight and protect against rapid temperature increases. White fabric or fiber wraps have been found effective for preventing high and low-temperature injuries to bark. A light-colored material that sheds water is ideal.

Tree wrap should only be applied for the first one to three years after the tree is planted. Trees should be wrapped at the end of autumn and the wrap should be removed in early spring, it should only be used seasonally for best results.

Young saplings and thin-barked trees like “linden, maple, ginkgo, crabapple, and redbud will benefit from tree wrap.” Trees with thicker bark, like bur oak, do not need to be wrapped.

== Yarn ==
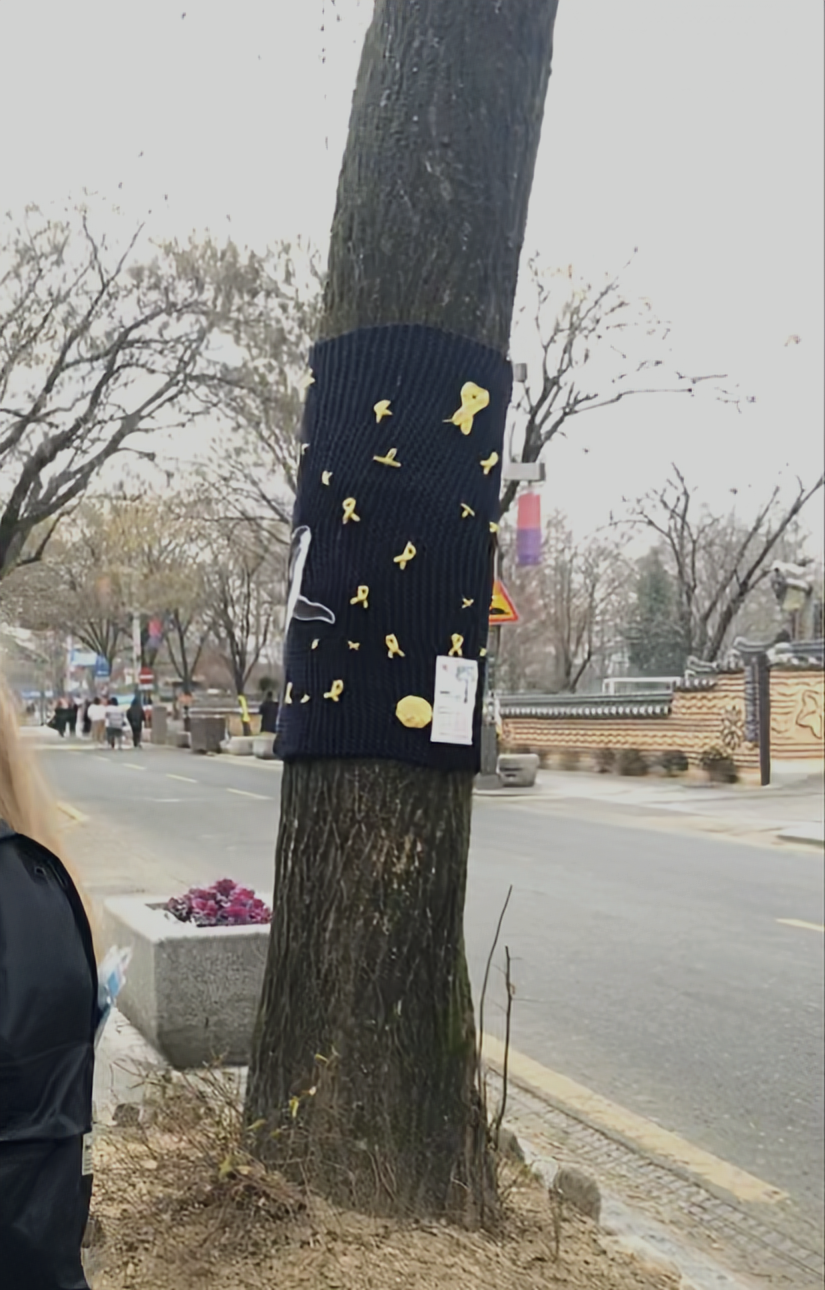
Yarn tree wrap in South Korea

Yarn is used for tree wrap in instances of yarnbombing. For example, in South Korea, community members in Incheon knit tree wrap to provide thermal insulation for trees during the winter and add color to the landscape. However, yarn that does not repel water could trap moisture and damage the tree.
