= Sun scald =

Effects of ultraviolet radiation on plants

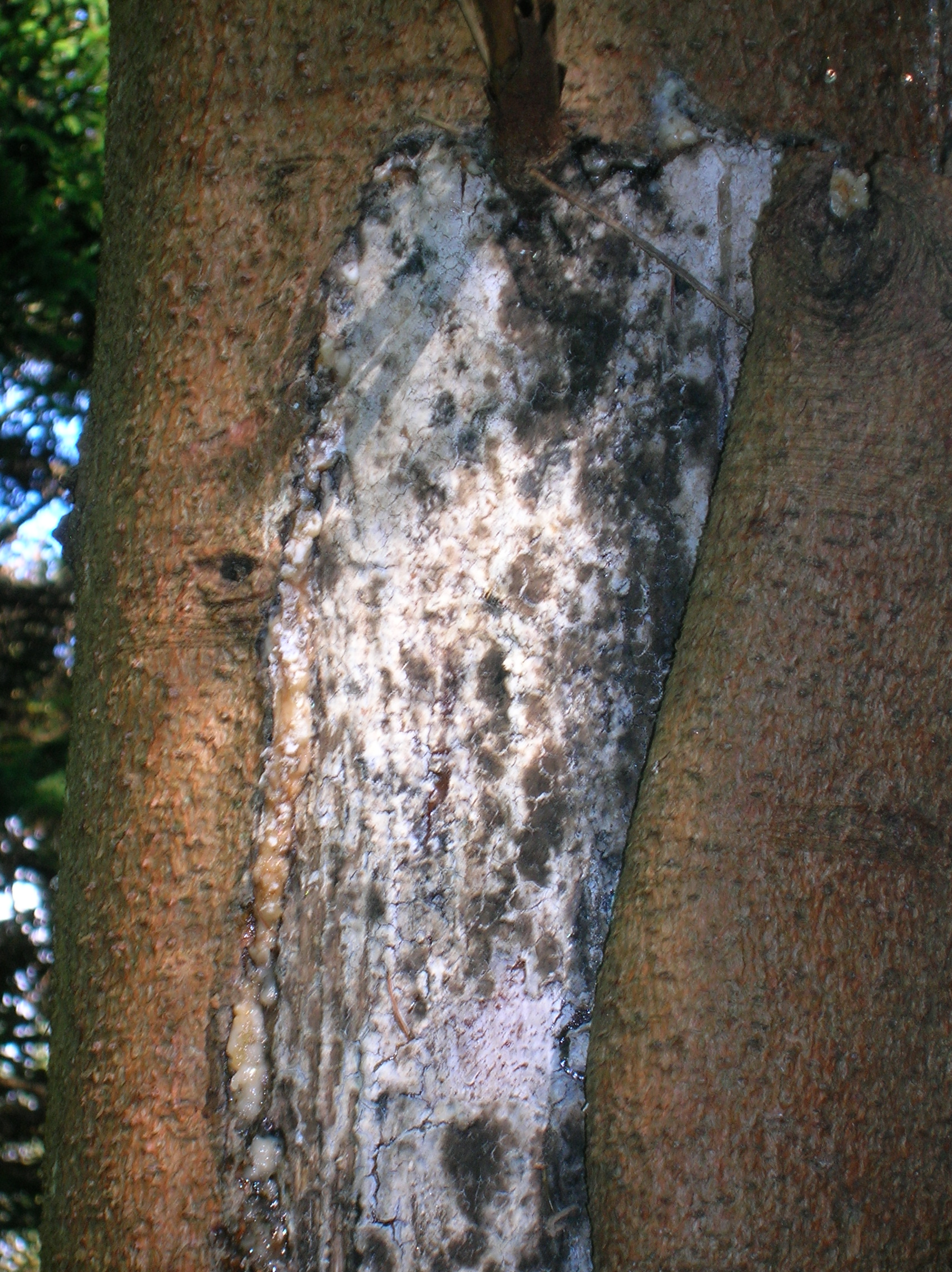
Sun scald on Sitka spruce

Sun scald is the freezing of bark following high temperatures in the winter season, resulting in permanent visible damage to bark. Fruits may also be damaged. In the northern hemisphere, it is also called southwest injury.

== Causes ==
The reason the sun can cause so much damage to trees is because of dormancy. When a tree is dormant in the winter it can be reactivated by warm weather. In the northern woods trees are exposed to the most sunlight and heat on the southwest facing side, so this side is heated during warm sunny winter days (in the afternoon, that's why westwards) to the point that it can be awoken from dormancy. The temperature required to wake up a tree depends on plant species and length of day, but it is typically just above freezing. Once active, the cells on the southwest side of the plant are unable to return to dormancy by nightfall, at which time the temperature returns to levels capable of killing active cells. Fluctuating winter temperatures can also cause frost cracks, which result from the expanding and contracting of the tree trunk.

== Trees ==
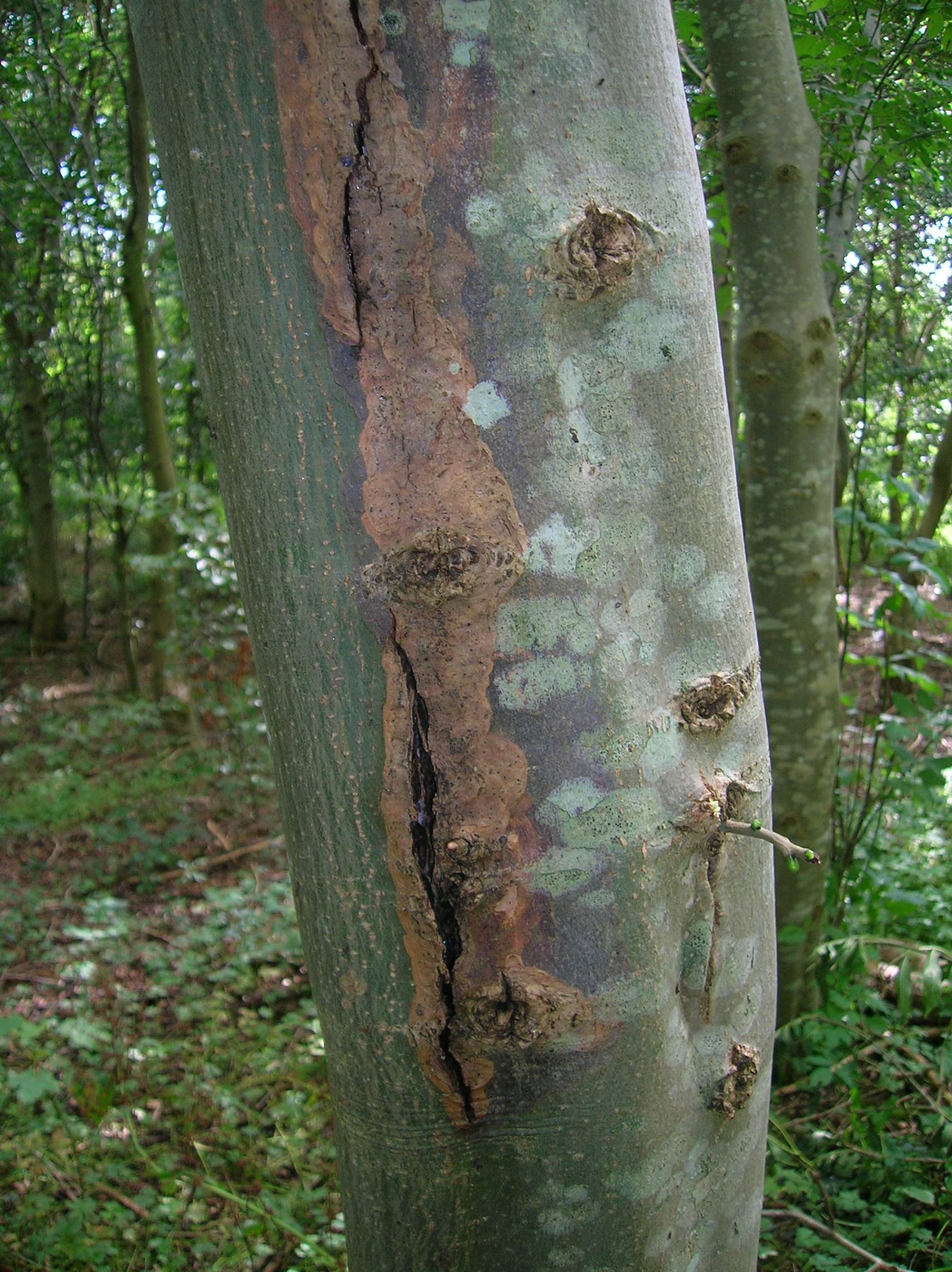
Sun scald on ash bark

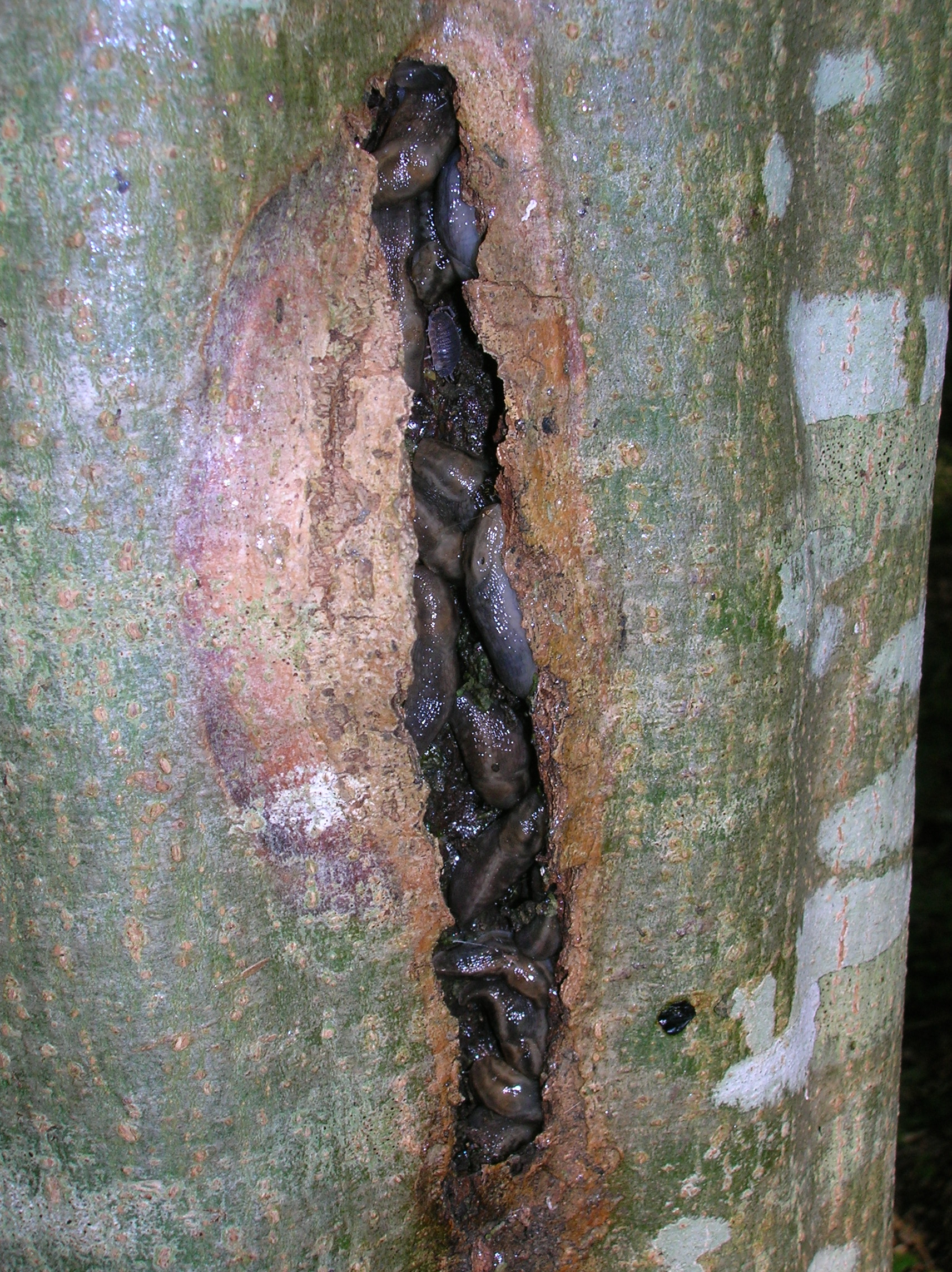
Slugs sheltering in a sun scald fissure

When sun scald appears on trees it is most frequently a result of reflected light off the snow during winter months. The damage in this case will appear as sunken or dead bark on the trunk of the tree, then later in the tree's life the bark might fall away revealing dead tissue in the tree's cambium layer. This damage will typically be found on the south west facing side of the tree's trunk. It can be found on other sides of the tree if there is light reflection from other sources, like man made structures or reflective rock faces. After a tree is afflicted by sun scald it becomes much more vulnerable to decay organisms. The plant will create walls around the affected area, but sometimes it is not enough to block the infections. The leaves of the tree are also affected by sun scald, particularly on a bright sunny day following a period of warm cloudy humidity. The damage to the leaves will start as bronzing of the epidermis between the veins of the leaf, and if the sunny conditions persist the tissue of the leaf will die.

== Fruits ==
Sun scald on fruit appears when a fruit is exposed to direct sunlight after cold storage for an extended period of time, typically after harvest. The damage can often lead to the death of the fruit via consumption by insects, animals, bacteria, or fungi. This is the case if the defenses of the fruit are too heavily inflicted, which may occur when the outer skin is damaged to the point that the cell walls/membranes are either gone or weak enough for the plant's enemies to penetrate. Sun scald often presents as more of an internal damage, with the affected tissue gaining a leathery or wrinkled appearance and a pale discoloration. The terms "sun scald" and "sunburn" are frequently used interchangeably, however fruit sunburn is generally distinguished by only occurring pre-harvest and leaving yellow, bronze, or brown discoloration of the skin. Fruits damaged to either extent are usually considered unmarketable due to diminished appearance, taste, and texture, but those of the latter are sometimes sold at a lower grade or utilized as an (often puréed) ingredient. Sun damage cannot be reversed, but the fruit may still be able to fend off attacks and partially recover if properly treated and protected from further damage.

== Treatments ==
The treatment of sun scalding is fundamentally simple: reduce the intensity of the sun, or block the sun completely.

=== Wrapping ===
The most common method used to prevent sun scalding on the trunks of trees is to wrap the tree up to the first branch with white paper overlapping approximately thirty three percent each time around the tree. The white paper is effective in reflecting the heat of the sun off the tree. The paper should be applied after the tree has gone dormant for the winter and taken off before it becomes active again. If the paper is left on too long it can interfere with the growth of the tree and harbor insects that may damage the tree.

=== Painting ===
Painting the tree white has the same effect as wrapping, although it is a permanent change to the color of the tree. This discoloration can be aesthetically displeasing, so this method is mostly used in orchards and rarely in landscaping.

=== Shading ===
The amount of light a tree receives on its southwest side is correlated with the amount of sun scald the tree endures. Reducing the amount of light the tree is exposed to by planting a shrub or bush strategically to shade the southwest side can be less effective than wrapping or painting, but can have better aesthetic qualities for landscaping.

=== Fruits ===
For fruit the most important part of avoiding sun scald is to be aware of where the fruit has been during its growth. If the fruit grew in the shade then exposing it to the sun will be likely to yield damage to the produce. Because of the importance of keeping shaded fruits out of the sun, leaves of fruit plants should be monitored for wilting and disease. If the leaves that shade a fruit die, the fruit will be exposed and in danger of sun scald. Another measure that can be taken to avoid damage is covering the fruits with straw or screen to block the sun.

== See also ==
- Frost crack
