= Frost crack =

Form of tree bark damage

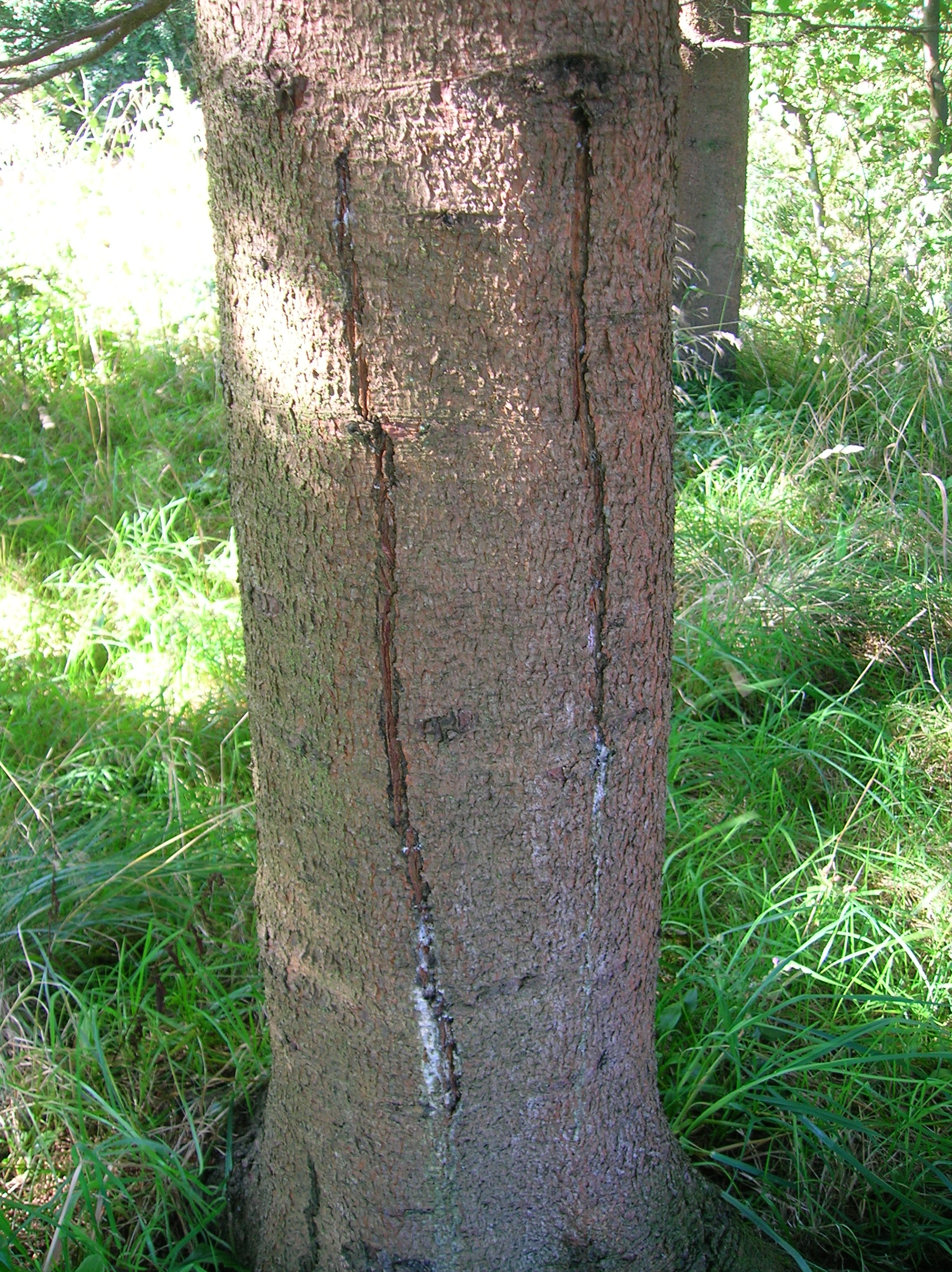
Frost crack on Sitka spruce bark

Frost crack or Southwest canker is a form of tree bark damage sometimes found on thin-barked trees, visible as vertical fractures on the southerly facing surfaces of tree trunks. Frost crack is distinct from sun scald and sun crack and physically differs from normal rough-bark characteristics as seen in mature oaks, pines, poplars and other tree species.

== Normal bark formation ==
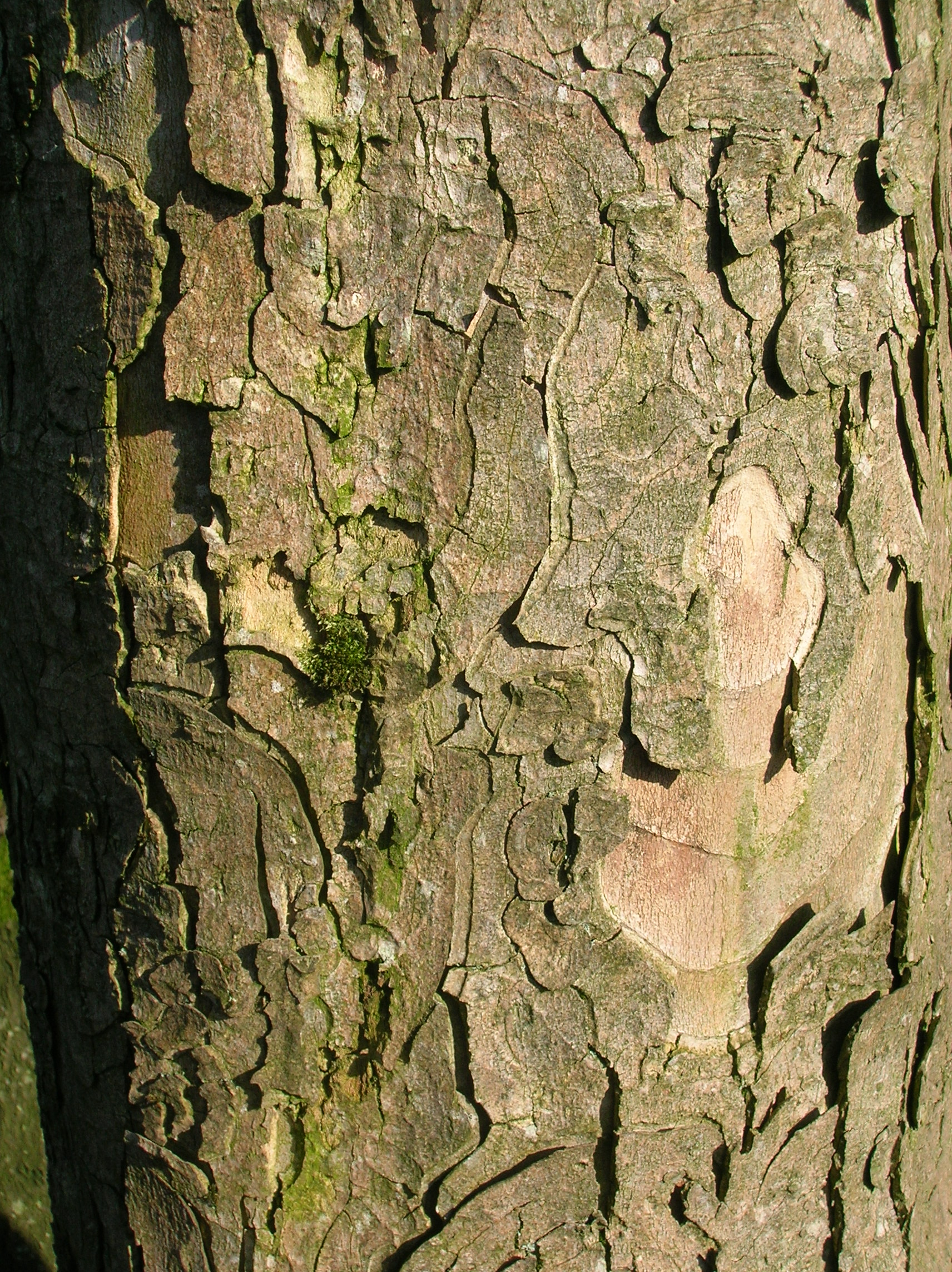
Sycamore bark with normal sloughing plates

The sloughing or peeling of the bark is a normal process, especially in the spring when the tree begins to grow. The outer layers of the bark are dead tissue and therefore they cannot grow, the outer bark splitting in order for the tree to grow in circumference, increasing its diameter. The inner bark cambium and phloem tissues are living, and form a new protective layer of cells as the outer bark pulls apart.

Normal furrowed bark has a layer of bark over the wood below, however bark may peel or fall off the tree in sheets (river birch), plates (sycamore and pine), strips (cedar) or blocks (dogwood).

== Causes ==
Frost cracks are frequently the result of some sort of weakness in the bark which occurred to the tree earlier. In late winter and early spring, water in the phloem, known as the inner bark and in the xylem, known as the wood, expands and contracts under often significantly fluctuating temperatures. Wood that is in some way damaged does not contract to the same degree as healthy wood. Rapid expansion and contraction of water within the wood and bark, particularly under rapidly falling night temperatures, can result in a frost crack, often accompanied by a loud explosive report.

Research suggests that the main cause is actually 'frost-shrinkage' due to the freezing-out of cell wall moisture into lumens of wood cells. Other causes are the expansion of freezing water in cell lumens, and additionally the formation of ice lenses within wood. As stated, previous defects such as healed wounds, branch stubs, etc. in tree trunks function as stress raisers and trigger the frost cracking.

In winter when the sun sets or the sky clouds over, the temperature of the tree drops very quickly and as the bark cools more quickly and the wood contracts more slowly, the bark rips open in a long crack, sometimes with an audible report likened to a rifle crack. Cold, clear, sunny days are the most likely to result in frost cracking, particularly as the heat energy from the low Sun on a winter day can be higher than any other time of year.

Trees that are growing in poorly drained sites are more subject to frost cracking than are those growing in drier, better drained soils. Trees suddenly left exposed by felling are highly susceptible.

=== Frost crack examples ===
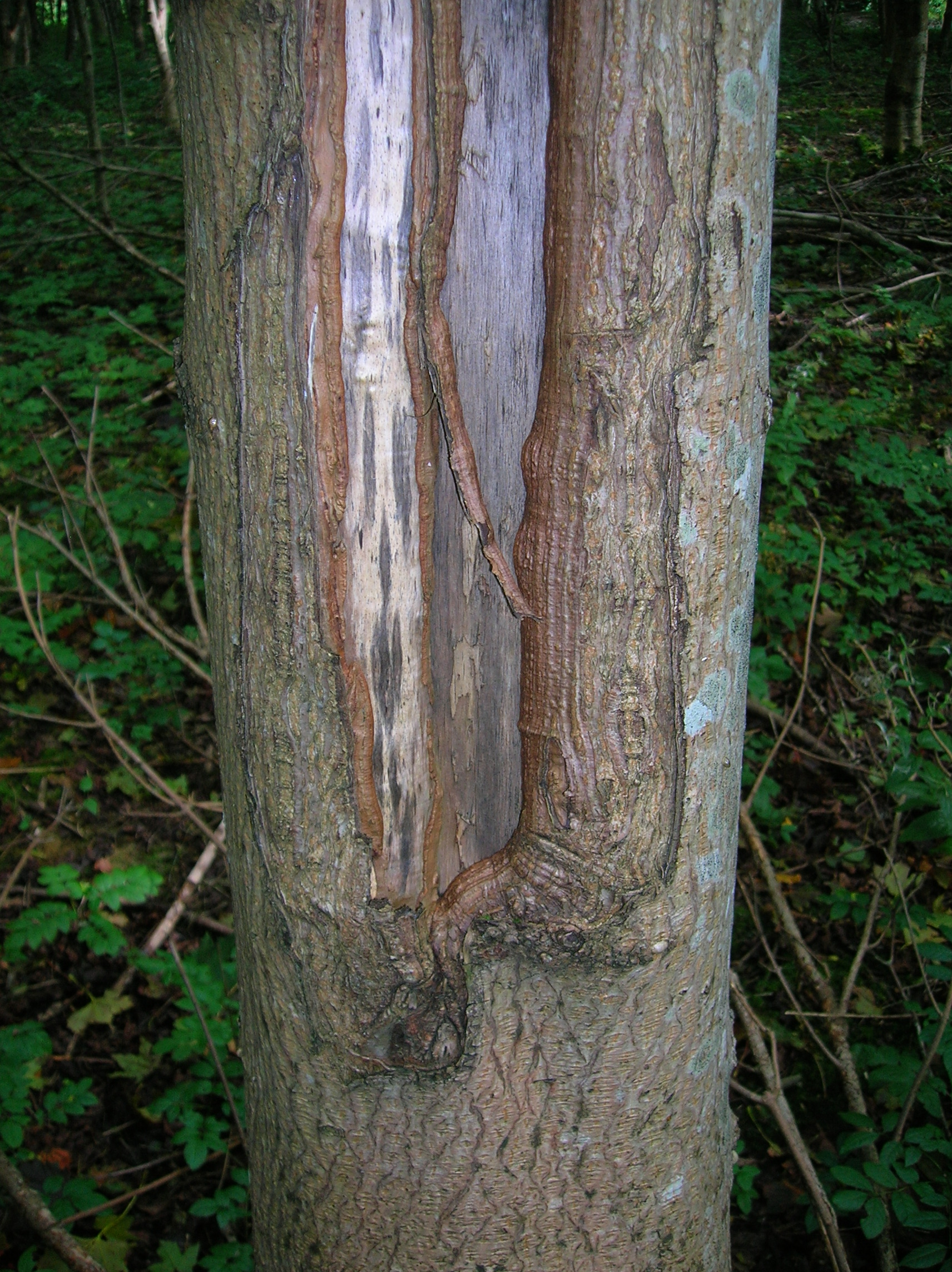
Initiation point of a frost crack on ash

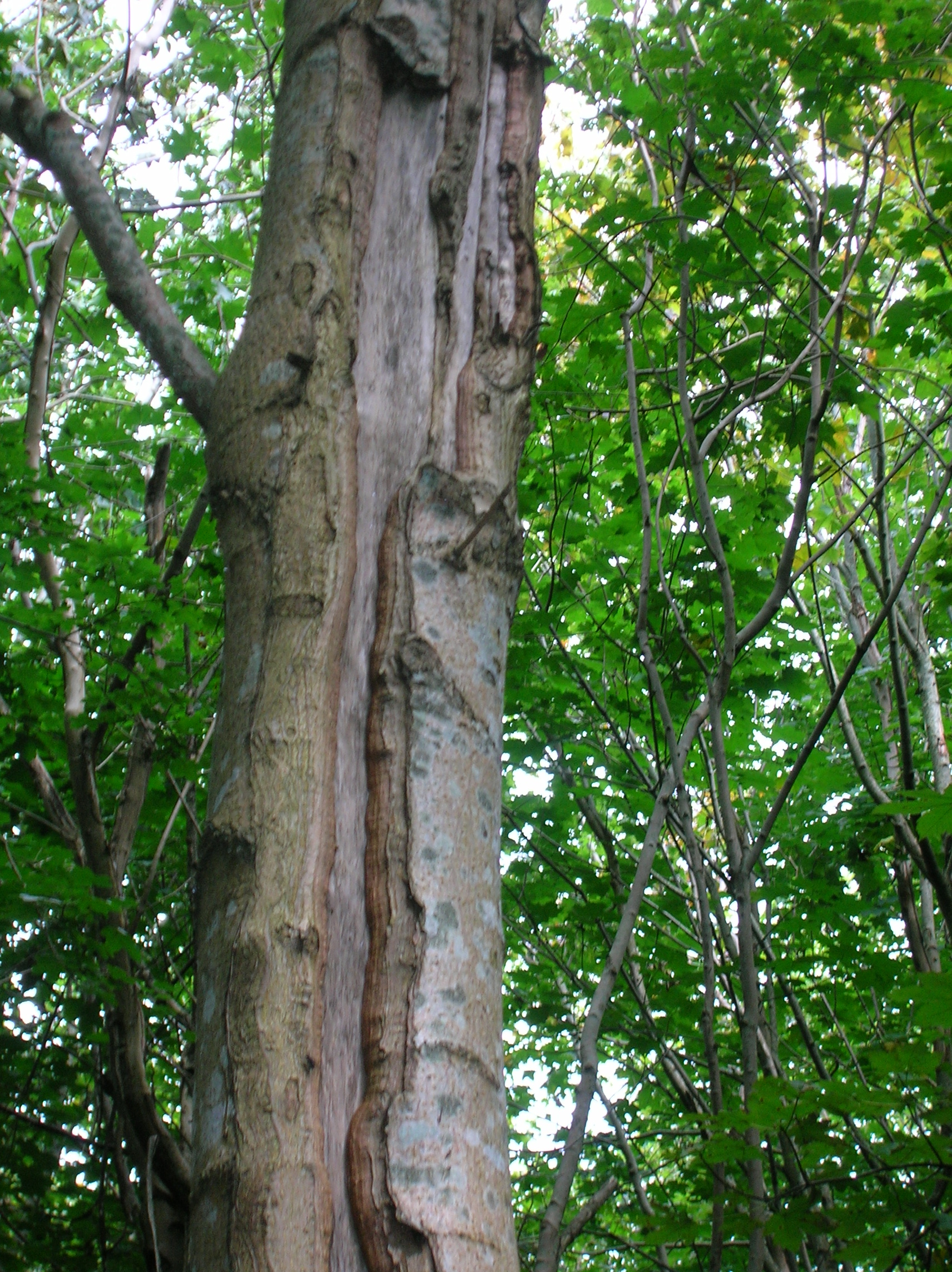
Termination of a frost crack

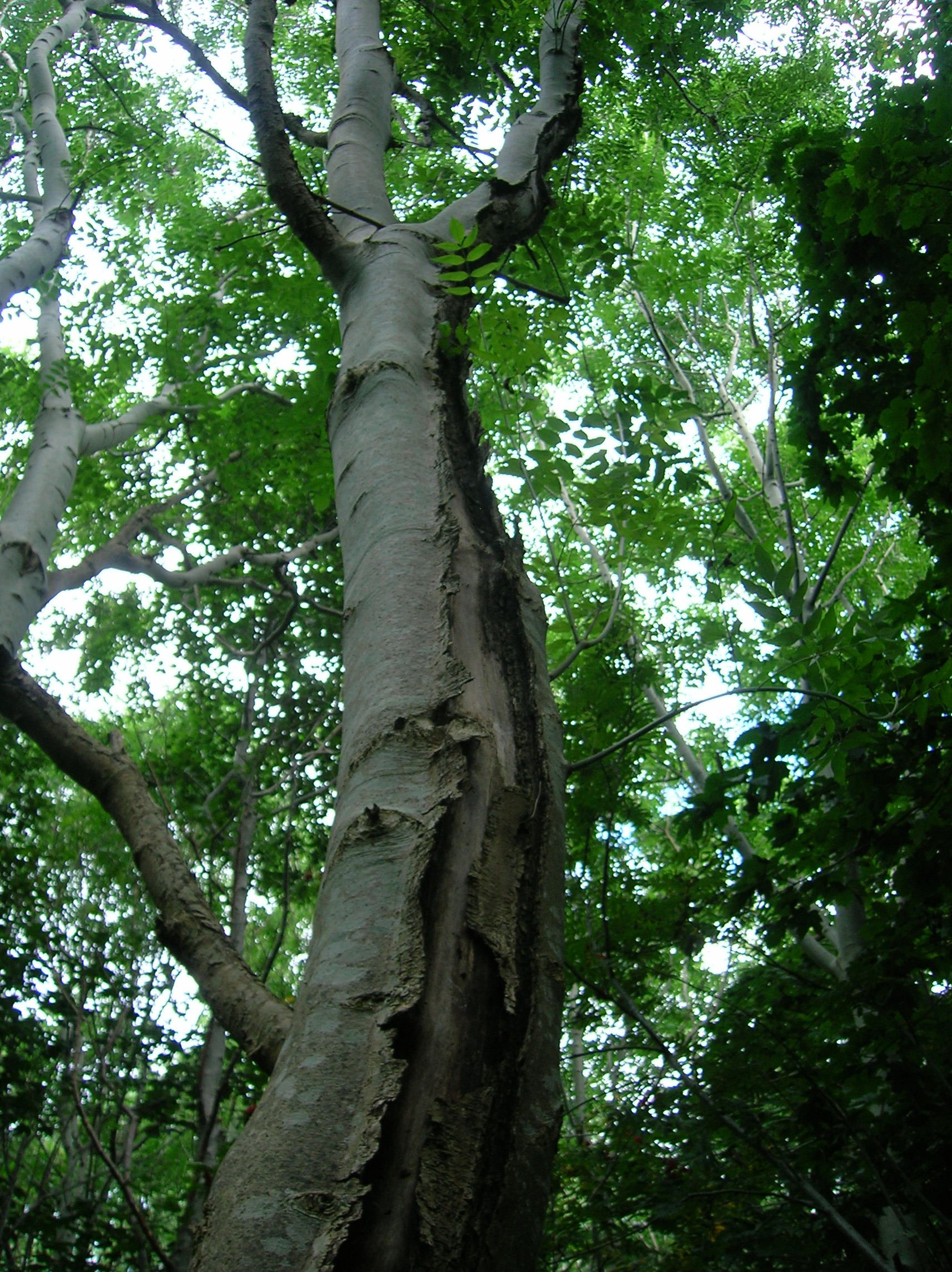
An extreme repeated frost crack

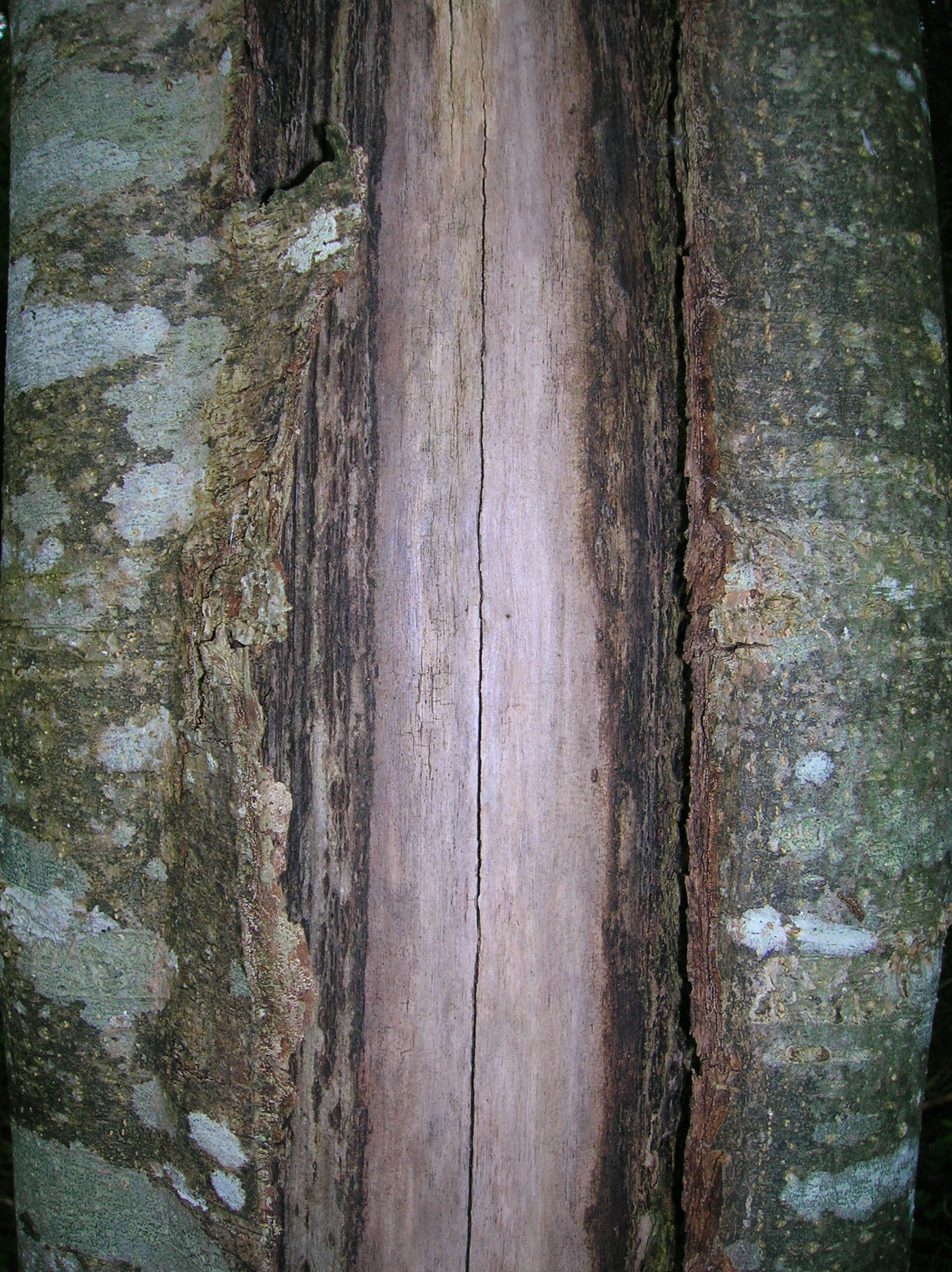
Close up of a frost crack with callus and bare timber

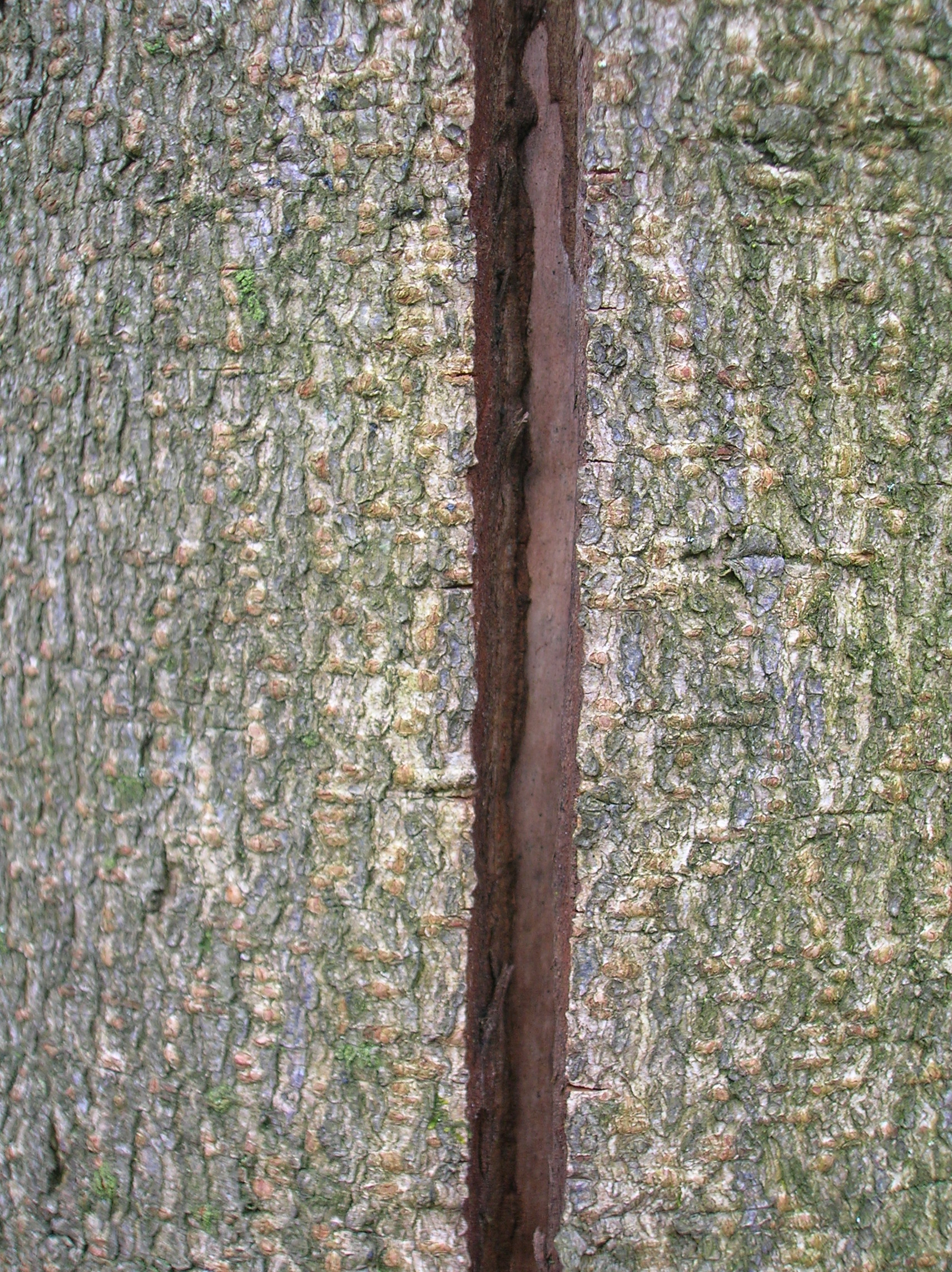
Frost crack in horse-chestnut bark

== Physical appearance ==
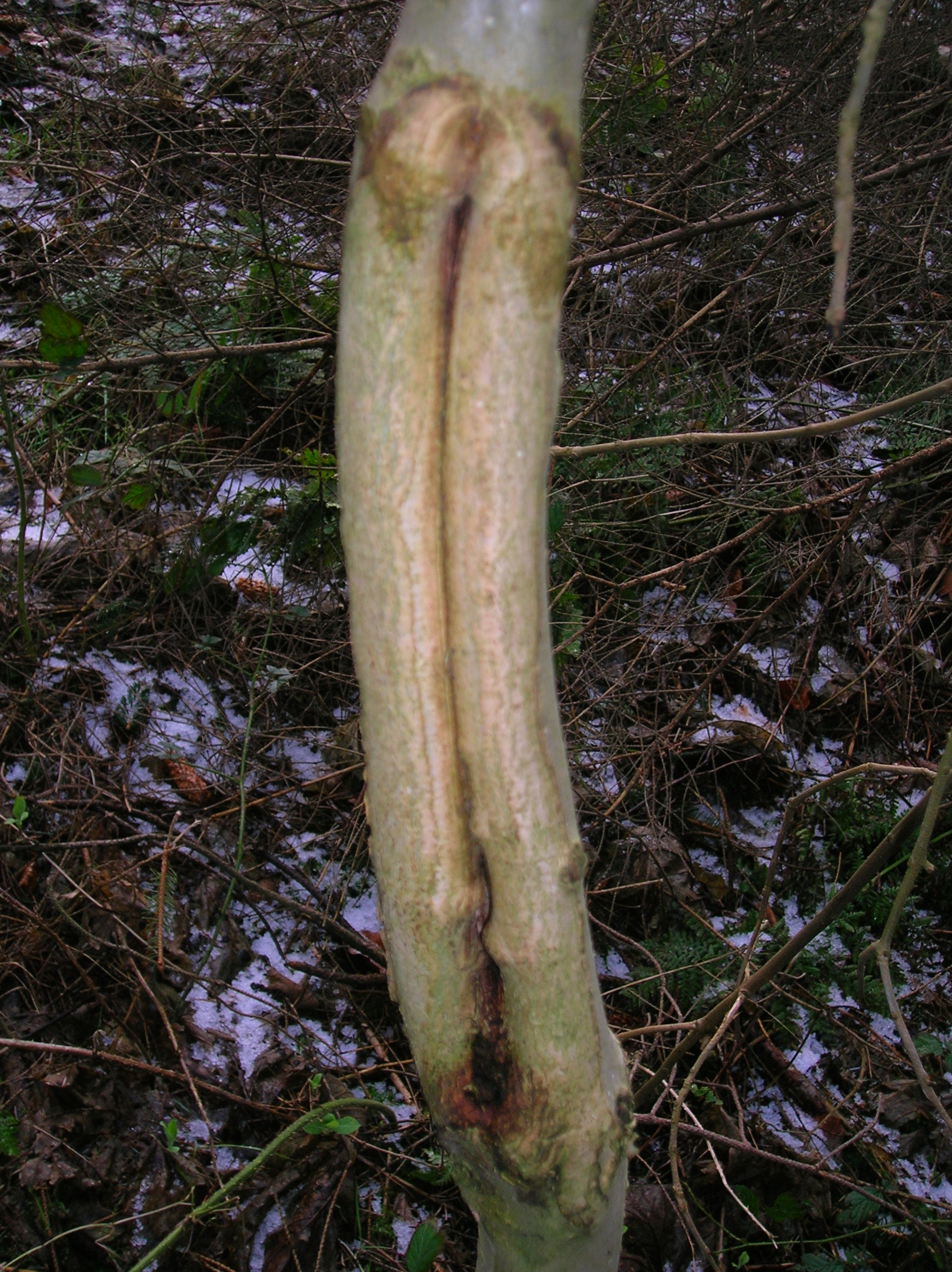
Repeated frost crack on an ash tree

Although frost cracks may be up to several metres long, these cracks usually only become apparent in early spring; they are often found on the southwest side of the tree. These cracks may heal in the summer and be reopen again in the winters, so that successive cracking and healing over a number of years results in the formation of 'frost ribs' on the sides of affected trees. The wood beneath the frost crack is rarely damaged. The cracks usually originate at the base of the trunk and extends from a metre to several metres upwards. Some discoloration is often found at the site of the damage.

== Effect of damage ==
Frost cracks often act as sites of entry for wood decay organisms, including insects, fungi and bacteria. Timber damaged in this way is unsuitable for use in buildings, etc.

== Tree species susceptibility ==
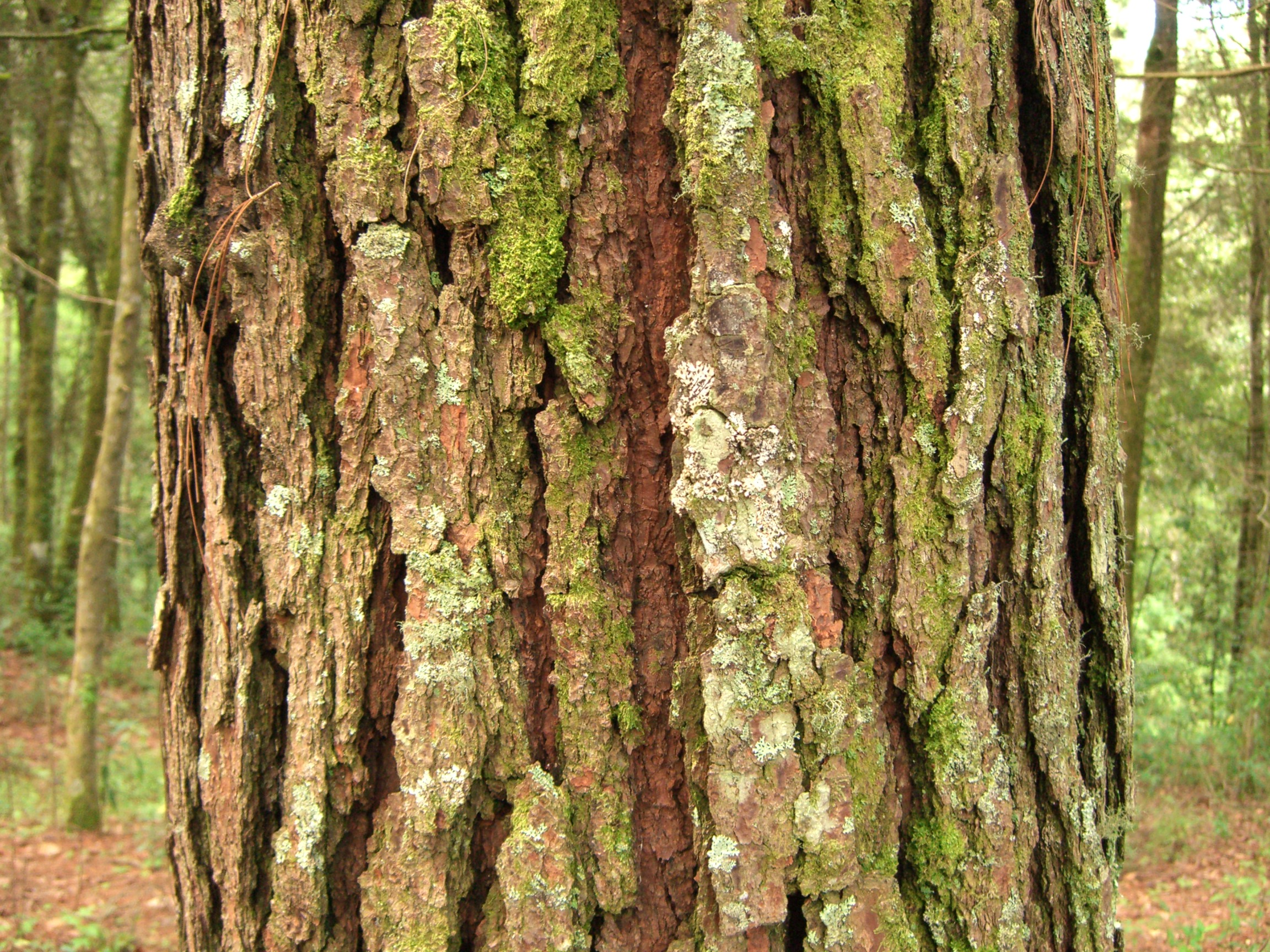
Bark of a pine tree showing normal sloughing of plates of bark

Species such as crab-apple, beech, walnut, oaks, maples, sycamore, horse-chestnut, willows and lime are prone to developing frost crack given the right conditions.

== Prevention ==
Avoiding the use of fertilizers late in the growing season can reduce the incidence of splits, also protecting the bark of young trees from physical damage such as that caused by lawn mowers, car bumpers, grazing animals, spades, trimmers, etc. Protect young trees in winter with paper tree wrap from ground level to the first main branches.

== Repair ==
Most tree species try to seal the edges of wounds by forming a callus. The wound's edges begin to form this callus during the first growing season after that crack appears and the callus layer will continue to grow and after many years, the wound may close over entirely.

== See also ==
- Exploding tree
- Sun scald
