= Lucjan Rydel =

Polish playwright and poet (1870–1918)

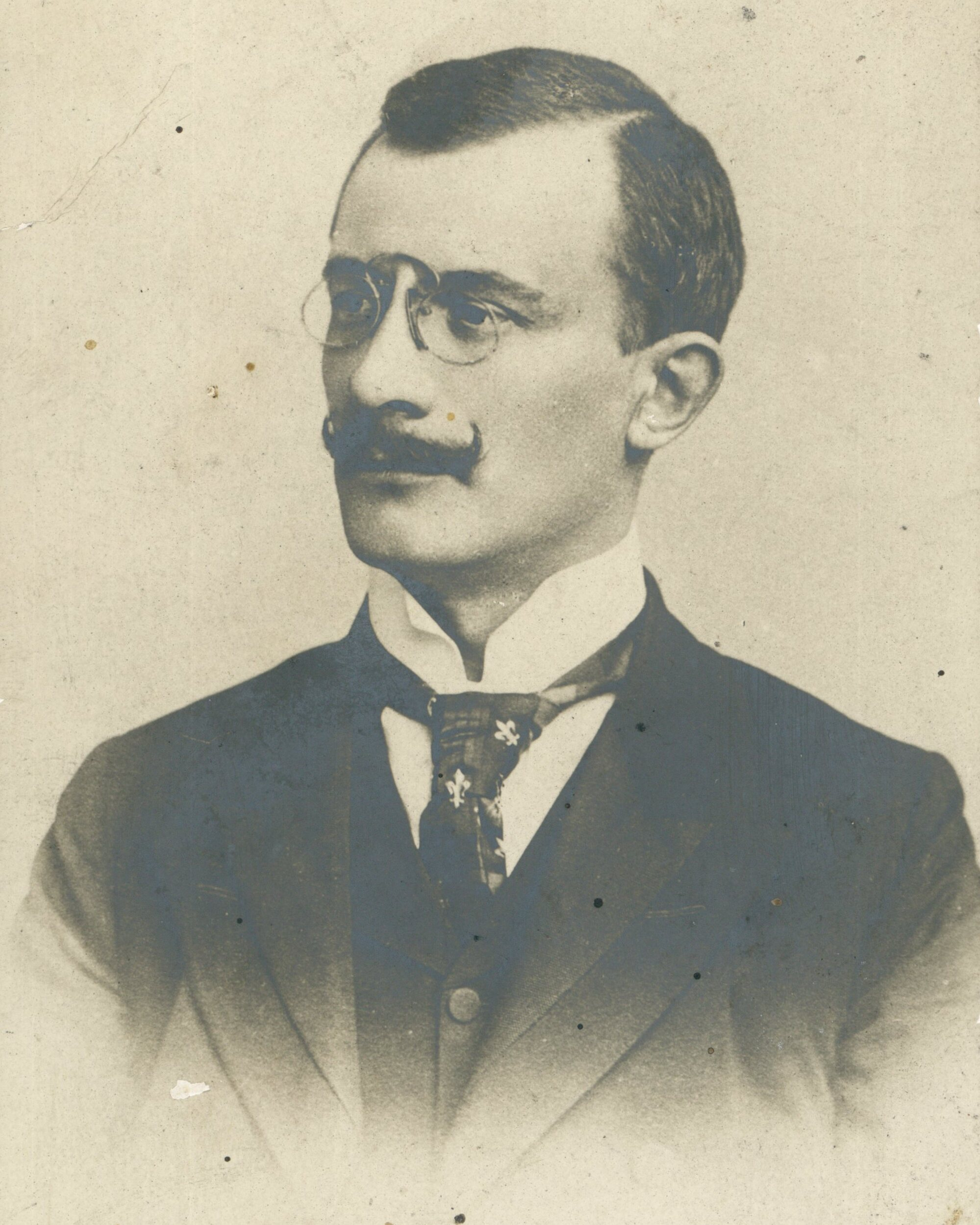
Lucjan Rydel before 1906

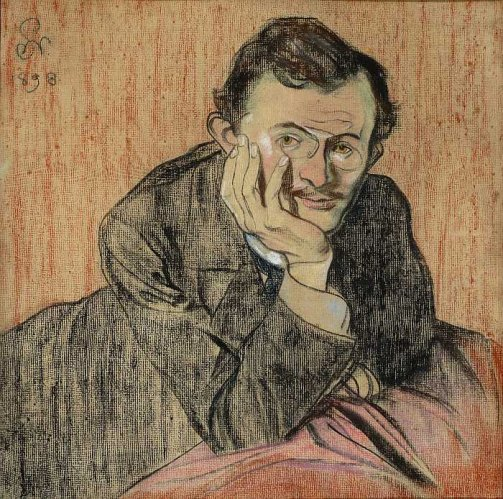
Wyspiański:Portrait of Lucjan Rydel, 1898

Lucjan Rydel, also known as Lucjan Antoni Feliks Rydel (17 May 1870 in Kraków – 8 April 1918 in Bronowice Małe), was a Polish playwright and poet from the Young Poland movement.

== Life ==
Rydel was the son of Lucjan Rydel, a surgeon, ophthalmologist, professor and Rector of Jagiellonian University in Kraków, and of Helena Kremer.

In 1904, Rydel wrote a nativity play, Polish Bethlehem (Betlejem polskie), and staged its production in two suburbs of Kraków, Tonie and Bronowice, with local villagers as actors. It was an expression of his profound respect for rural Poland as well as the result of his flair for theatrical experimentation. Rydel left the third and the final act of his play open. In the course of history, new characters, including contemporary Polish politicians and celebrities, were added to it by various producers to make the play appeal to new audiences.

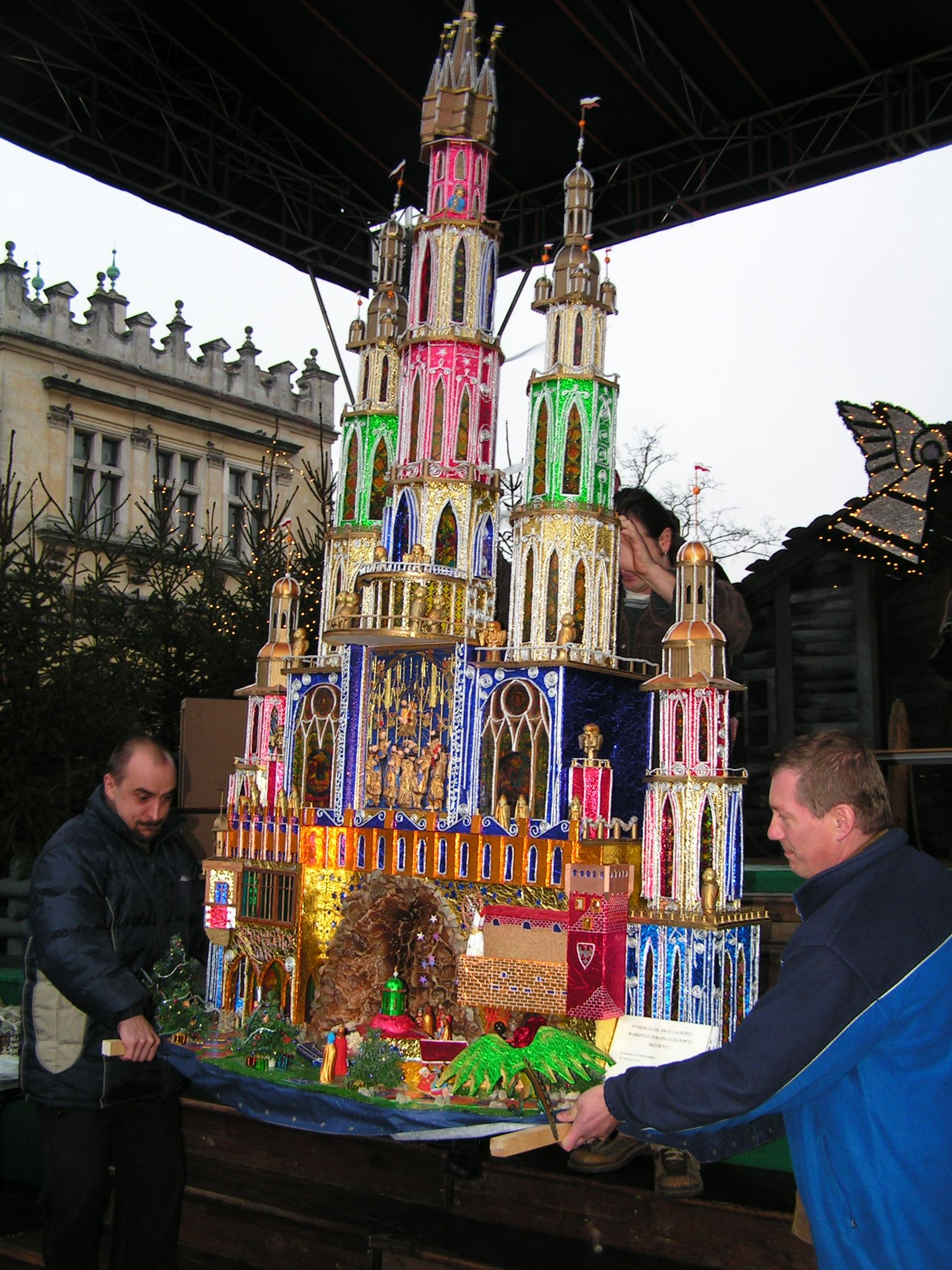
Szopka (Christmas Crib)

An open end play like Betlejem polskie is a tradition originating with Kraków's only Szopka (pronounced shopka, "The Nativity Scene", or "The Christmas Crib", commonly translated as "The Christmas Creche") to which new characters are added every year.

Rydel became the director of the renowned Juliusz Słowacki Theatre in Kraków for one season, 1915-1916.

His marriage to Jadwiga Mikołajczykówna, a peasant daughter from Bronowice, took place at the Rydlówka Manor, on Tetmajera Street. The event inspired Rydel's pen pal and friend Stanisław Wyspiański to write what became known as the defining Polish independence drama, Wesele ("The Wedding", or "The Wedding Reception").

Rydel's historical place of residence, the Rydlówka Manor, houses a museum of the Young Poland period in the outskirts of Kraków.

Polish composer Jadwiga Sarnecka used Rydel’s text for her song “Szumny wichrze gluchych pol.”

== Selected plays ==
- Zaczarowane koło (1900)
- Betlejem polskie (1904)
- Ferenike i Pejsidoros (1909)
- Zygmunt August – trylogia dramatyczna (1912)

== See also ==
- Culture of Kraków
- List of Poles
