= Ascent of sap =

Upward movement of fluids from roots to aerial parts in plants

The ascent of sap in the xylem tissue of plants is the upward movement of water and minerals from the root to the aerial parts of the plant. The conducting cells in xylem are typically non-living and include, in various groups of plants, vessel members and tracheids. Both of these cell types have thick, lignified secondary cell walls and are dead at maturity. Although several mechanisms have been proposed to explain how sap moves through the xylem, the cohesion-tension mechanism has the most support. Although cohesion-tension has received criticism due to the apparent existence of large negative pressures in some living plants, experimental and observational data favor this mechanism.

== Theories of sap ascent ==
By the early 1800s, it has been established that sap flows through the xylem. However, it was not clear what mechanism caused this to occur.

=== Vital force theories ===
Vital force theories propose sap flows due to activity of the living cells in the plant body.

==== Relay-pump theory ====
Godlewski (1884) proposed the relay-pump theory to explain the ascent of sap. He believed water potential of living cells of the xylem, such as xylem parenchyma, changed rhythmically causing water to rise. However, this was soon discredited as even when the living cells are killed by heat or chemical treatment water continued to rise in the xylem.

==== Bose's pulsatory movement theory ====
One early theory that has recently been revisited is the one presented by Jagadish Chandra Bose in 1923. In his experiment, he used his invention called a galvanometer (made of an electric probe and copper wire) and inserted it into the cortex of the Desmodium plant. After analyzing the findings his experiment, he saw that there were rhythmic electric oscillations. He concluded that plants move sap through pulses or a heartbeat. Many scientists discredited his work and claimed that his findings were not creditable. These scientists believed that the oscillations he recorded was an action potential across the cell wall. Modern-day scientists hypothesized that the oscillations that were measured in Bose's initial experiment was a stress response due to presence of sodium in the water. The results of this modern-day experiment showed that there were no rhythmic electric oscillations present in the plant. Despite not being able to replicate the oscillations that Bose recorded, this study believes that the presence of sodium played a role in his findings. Furthermore, plants do not have a pulse or heartbeat.

=== Other theories ===
An alternative theory based on the behavior of thin films has been developed by Henri Gouin, a French professor of fluid dynamics. The theory is intended to explain how water can reach the uppermost parts of the tallest trees, where the applicability of the cohesion-tension theory is debatable.

The theory assumes that in the uppermost parts of the tallest trees, the vessels of the xylem are coated with thin films of sap. The sap interacts physically with the walls of the vessels: as a result of van der Waals forces, the density of the film varies with distance from the wall of a vessel. This variation in density, in turn, produces a "disjoining pressure", whose value varies with distance from the wall. (Disjoining pressure is a difference in pressure from that which prevails in the bulk of a liquid; it is due to the liquid's interaction with a surface. The interaction may result in a pressure at the surface that is greater or less than that which prevails in the rest of the liquid.) As a tree's leaves transpire, water is drawn from the xylem's vessels; hence, the thickness of the film of sap varies with height within a vessel. Since the disjoining pressure varies with the thickness of the film, a gradient in the disjoining pressure arises during transpiration: the disjoining pressure is greater at the bottom of the vessel (where the film is thickest) and less at the top of the vessel (where the film is thinner). This spatial difference in pressure within the film results in a net force that pushes the sap upwards towards the leaves.

== Xylem structure ==
Xylem tissue is one of two types of vascular tissue found in plants, and is composed of dead cells. It is used mainly for the transport of water, along with some small nutrients. The meristem of the stem creates cells which make up the cambium and pro-cambium. These cells then produce a highly branched poly-phenolic protein, called lignin, in a very high concentration. The cells then perform apoptosis, and the actual xylem tube begins to form. Being made of dead cells allows the xylem tube to function more efficiently by reducing friction, and by eliminating interactions xylem sap may have with living cells. It allows for a smooth and fast suction of water, and provides just enough friction to keep the column from rupturing. The rigid structure of the lignin protein gives a sturdy structure to the tube, and even provides some structure and support for the plant. Xylem mainly functions to transport water from the roots to the rest of the plant, however it also transports some nutrients, such as amino acids, small proteins, ions, and some other vital nutrients.

== Phloem structure ==
The phloem is the living portion of the vascular system of a plant, and serves to move sugars and photosynthate from source cells to sink cells. Phloem tissue is made of sieve elements and companion cells, and is surrounded by parenchyma cells. The sieve element cells work as the main player in transport of phloem sap. When fully matured, they have no nucleus, and only a handful of organelles. This allows them to be highly specified, and very efficient at transport, since they are not taking any of the solutes they are transporting. These cells are connected to form the full tube by their plasmodesmata. From here, the solutes traveling through the phloem can move either as a symplast, or apoplast. The loading and unloading of phloem sap is done mainly by pressure flow, and relies on loading of the cells and unloading of the cells happening at the same time to maintain the turgor pressure of the system.

== Sap components ==
There are two different types of sap that are in a plant. These types are xylem and phloem sap, both differing in their compositions. Sap that is transported in the phloem is mainly made of water. The second most abundant substance is sucrose. One study found that the rice plant Oryza sativa had a sucrose concentration of 570 nm, but the sucrose concentration is unique to each organism. Another important component of phloem sap is nitrogen. Nitrogen is usually not being transported in its ionic form. Instead it is incorporated in amino acids such as glutamate and aspartate. Hormones, inorganic ions, RNA, and proteins are found in the phloem sap as well.

Xylem sap is mostly made of water. This is because one of the main roles of xylem is to transport water and inorganic nutrients throughout the plant. Water is not the only thing that makes up xylem sap though. Xylem sap contains long-distance signaling hormones, proteins, enzymes, and transcription factors. One study found that proteins transported in this sap can be as large as 31 kDa.
