= Exodermis =

Part of a plant

The exodermis is a physiological barrier that has a role in root function and protection. The exodermis is a membrane of variable permeability responsible for the radial flow of water, ions, and nutrients. It is the outer layer of a plant's cortex. The exodermis serves a double function as it can protect the root from invasion by foreign pathogens and ensures that the plant does not lose too much water through diffusion through the root system and can properly replenish its stores at an appropriate rate.

== Overview and function ==
The exodermis is a specialized type of hypodermis that develops Casparian strips in its cell wall, as well as further wall modifications. The Casparian strip is a band of hydrophobic, cork-like tissue that is found on the outside of the endodermis and the exodermis. Its main function is to prevent solution backflow into the cortex and to maintain root pressure. It is also involved in ensuring that soil is not pulled directly into the root system during nutrient uptake.

Exodermis cells are found on the outermost layer of almost all seed vascular plants and the outer layer of the cortex of many angiosperms including onion, hoya canoas, maize, and sunflower plants but not on seedless vascular plants. As with most plant species, there is a large variety in the thickness and permeability of the exodermis, to better allow the plants to be suited to their environments.

Although the term barrier is used to describe the exodermis, the exodermis behaves more like a membrane through which different materials can pass. It can modify its permeability so that in response to different external stimuli, it can change to better suit the root's requirements. This serves as a function for survival, as root systems are exposed to changing environmental conditions and thus the plant needs to modify itself as necessary, either in thickening or thinning of Casparian strips or by changing the permeability of the band to certain ions. It also has been found to modify the permeability during root growth and maturation.

== Growth and structure ==
Roots are specialized for the uptake of water, nutrients (including ions for proper function). Similar to the endodermis, the exodermis contains very compact cells and is surrounded by a Casparian band, two features which are used to restrict the flow of water to a symplastic fashion (through the cytoplasm) rather than apoplastic fashion (through the cell wall) flow through passages through the cells' membranes called plasmodesmata.

Plasmodesma are small junctions that provide a direct connection between the cytoplasm of two neighboring plant cells. Similar to gap junctions found in animal cells, they allow an easy connection between the two cells permitting the transfer of ions, water and intercellular communication. This connection in the cytoplasm allows for neighboring plants to act as if they have one cytoplasm; a feature that enables the proper function of the exodermis.

Apoplast and symplast pathways through plasmodesma cells.

The apoplast is located outside the plasma membrane of the root cells and is the location at which inorganic materials can diffuse easily according to their concentration gradient. This apoplastic region is broken up by Casparian strips. The Casparian band is involved in the exodermal cell's ability to regulate water flow movement through the membrane as it is the hydrophobic nature of this band that controls the water entry and exit from the root. Exodermal cells have also found to develop another layer of thickened, tertiary hydrophobic substance on the inside of their plasma membrane walls known as the suberin lamellae which form a protective layer on the inside of the cortex of the exodermis. This layer is composed of a protein called suberin and is also hydrophobic meaning it also contributes to the ability of the exodermis to control water input. This added protection can result in the accelerated aging of the Casparian strips.

Maturation of exodermal tissue occurs in three distinct stages: Stage 1 sees the development of the Casparian strips in the cell wall between the exodermis and the endodermis. Stage 2 includes the deposition of suberin and other hydrophobic polymers and cell membranes of individual exodermal cells. It also serves in forming the connection between the plasmodesmata and the Casparian strip. Stage 3 includes the addition of cellulose and lignin with occasional deposition of suberin into the cell walls to strengthen them. Since suberin and the Casparian band are responsible for inhibiting nutrient and fluid uptake, it forces it across the exodermis and endodermis and into the root cortex.

Exodermal cells can be found very close to the tip of the root, with some plants demonstrating exodermal cells as close to 30 mm from the tip.

== Passage cells ==
A passage cell is short cells that form a thin layer along the long axis of the plant exodermis. These cells are a structural feature in the exodermis as they allow the uptake of ions Calcium and Magnesium, hence why they are commonly associated with exodermal cells. Their role does not correspond to any particular tissue meaning that they are found in all areas of the exodermis as they are needed. They are found frequently in herbaceous and woody species and are found to be more common in areas of lower rainfall, as the development of these cells decreases the amount of water lost through the radius of the plant. Although they do contain Casparian strips, the following development and maturation of suberin lamellae and thicker cellulose walls do not progress.

Passage cells are partially responsible for growth and development. As the plant ages and growth slows, the number of passage cells begins to decrease, resulting in a complete lack of passage cells altogether. In response to dehydration, some passage cells, particularly those located in aquatic environments, have developed pads that are composed of lignin and cellulose and are designed to close the cells to prevent further loss of ions and water to the environment via diffusion

== Changes in response to external stimuli ==
Being involved in water uptake and regulation of solutes into and out of the membrane, the exodermal cells must adapt to their external environment to ensure that the plant can survive. Because there are so many individual species of plant, each with different environmental conditions and with different nutrient requirements, it is the variability of this membrane that provides the option to ensure appropriate nutrient levels are reached. Exodermal cells can modify their Casparian strips to fit changing stimuli. Exodermal barriers can change their permeability as necessary to ensure that adequate nutrients are reaching the plant. In microenvironments, where macronutrient levels are low (such as phosphorus, nitrogen and potassium) development in the exodermis, Casparian strips and the suberin lamellae. In areas with high-stress conditions such as heavy metal concentration, high salt concentration and other inorganic compounds, the exodermal cells are wider and shorter, ensuring that these toxic components cannot enter the root complex and cause damage to the system.

Plants are found all over the world in a variety of different environmental conditions, each with their challenges in survival. There have been many investigations conducted into the specific nature of these cells for specific plants each with their specializations.

In environments with low water supply, such as in drought or desert conditions, the deposit of tertiary layers in the plant's exodermis can be found far higher in the apex of the root system. In areas with a high water environment, such as wetlands and in areas that are predominantly anaerobic or hypoxic, plants' exodermis layers were found to develop patchy exodermal layers to aid the diffusion of oxygen into the root system more effectively.

As the plant begins to age and mature the level of suberisation in the plant cells will increase, causing a decrease in the total amount of water that can enter the plant root complex. It will also cause an increase in the selectivity of the ions that are able to cross the barrier and be absorbed, slowly becoming more susceptible to large osmotic changes. The apoplastic nature of the exodermis means that selectivity should decrease with age not increase, however evidence and conflicting results between studies suggest otherwise and warrants further investigation.

Lignin is a biopolymer that has been found to develop naturally in the Casparian strip to strengthen and thicken the cell wall of the plants. As the root begins to encounter higher soil density and conditions where the soil has higher water content, the root cortex and surrounding structures begin to thicken. In areas where there is less soil, (from high wind areas or poor soil quality) exodermal growth is severely hindered.

== Xanthone synthesis ==
Xanthones are a type of specialized bioactive constituents that are found to accumulate in the root system Hypericum perforatum. Xanthones are abundant in angiosperms with cDNA evidence suggesting that they are also present in Lusiaceae, Gentianaceae and Hypericaceae species.

Xanthones are known to the Chemistry and Pharmacology industries for its potential use as an anti-depressant. It has also been found to actively treat fungal infections on human skin. Xanthone derivatives are being used to generate new pharmacological products as they have a close link with Acetyl Coenzyme A (Acetyl CoA). The carbon backbone for xanthones is formed by Benzophenone synthase (BPS) and through a series of oxidation and condensation reactions, xanthones are produced. Xanthone messenger RNA and associated proteins are localized to the exodermis and Endodermis systems.

Xanthone

Similar to other parts of the root system, the concentration of these molecules is dependent on the genetic variation and the environmental factors. The exodermis is involved in preventing the entry of pathogens into the cortex of the plant. In the root system with bacterial infections and invasion from rhizogenes, the concentration of BPS increases to fight off the pathogens. Particularly high concentrations of xanthones was also found in aerial root systems.

- Suberin
- Endodermis
- Cortex
