= Casparian strip =

Thickening in the root endodermis of vascular plants

The Casparian strip is a band-like thickening in the center of the root endodermis (radial and tangential walls of endodermal cells) of vascular plants (Pteridophytes and Spermatophytes). The composition of the region is lignin and some structural proteins, which are capable of reducing the diffusive apoplastic flow of water and solutes into the stele, its width varies between species. In the root, the Casparian strip is embedded within the cell wall of endodermal cells in the non-growing region of the root behind the root tip. Here, the Casparian strip serves as a boundary layer separating the apoplast of the cortex from the apoplast of the vascular tissue thereby blocking diffusion of material between the two. This separation forces water and solutes to pass through the plasma membrane via a symplastic route in order to cross the endodermis layer.

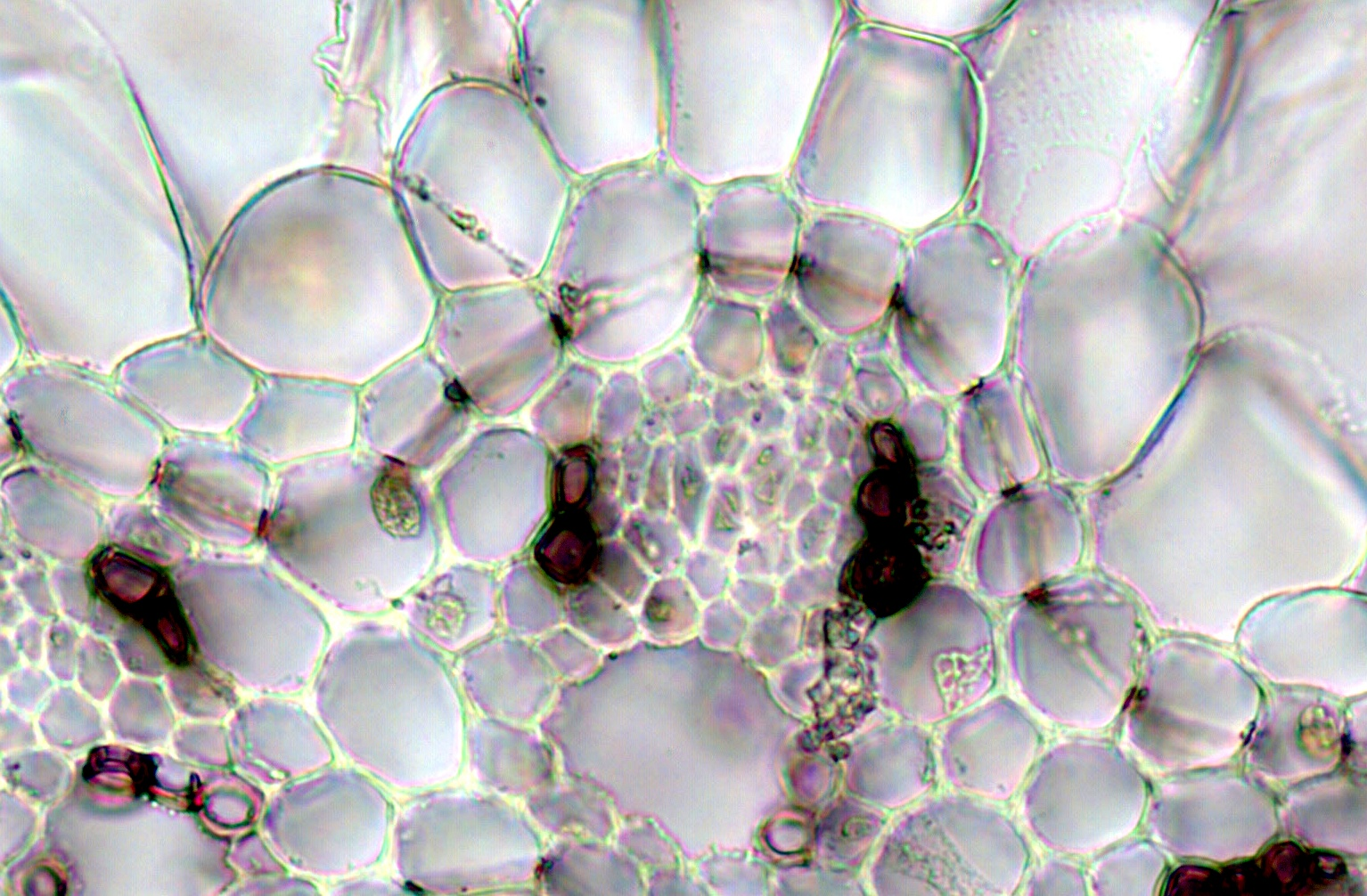
Endodermis with Casparian strip (in Equisetum giganteum)

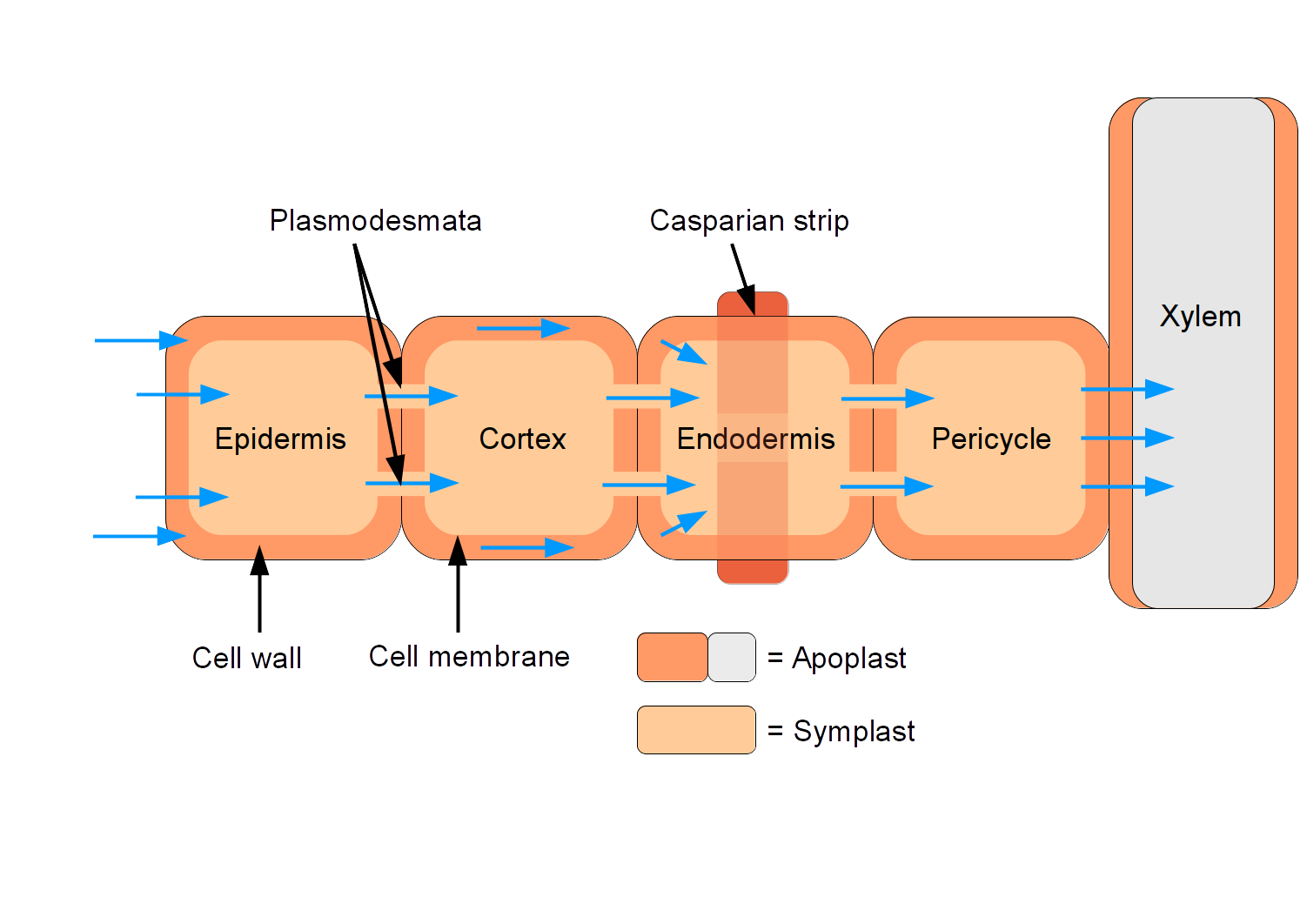
Diagram of symplastic and apoplastic water uptake by a plant root. The Casparian strip forces water into the symplast at the root endodermal cells.

The development of the Casparian strip is regulated by transcription factors such as SHORT-ROOT (SHR), SCARECROW (SCR) and MYB36, as well as polypeptide hormone synthesized by midcolumn cells. According to some studies, the Casparian strip begins as a localized deposition of phenolic and unsaturated fatty substances in the middle lamella between the radial walls, as partly oxidized films. The primary wall becomes encrusted with and later thickened by deposits of similar substances on the inside of that wall. The encrustation of the cell wall by the material constituting the Casparian strip presumably plugs the pores that would have otherwise allowed the movement of water and nutrients via capillary action along that path. The cytoplasm of the endodermal cell is firmly attached to the Casparian strip so that it does not readily separate from the strip when the cells are subjected to contraction of the protoplasts.

Casparian strips differentiate after an outward growth of the cortex is completed. At this level of the root development, the primary xylem of its vascular cylinder is only partly advanced. In gymnosperms and angiosperms displaying secondary growth, the roots commonly develop only endodermis with Casparian strips. In many of those, the endodermis is later discarded, together with the cortex, when the periderm develops from the pericycle. If the pericycle is superficial and the cortex is retained, either the endodermis is stretched or crushed or it keeps pace with the expansion of the vascular cylinder by radial anticlinal divisions, and the new walls develop Casparian strips in continuity with the old ones.

In the absence of secondary growth (most monocotyledons and a few eudicots), the endodermis commonly undergoes wall modifications. There are two developmental stages beyond the development of the Casparian strip. In the second stage suberin (or endoderm) coats the entire wall on the inside of the cell. As a result, the Casparian strip is separated from the cytoplasm and the connection between the two ceases to be evident. In the third stage, a thick cellulose layer is deposited over the suberin, sometimes mainly on the inner tangential walls. The thickened wall, as well as the original wall in which the Casparian strip is located, may become lignified, creating a secondary cell wall. The Casparian strip may be identifiable after the thickening of the endodermal wall has occurred. The thickened endodermal wall may have pits. The successive development of endodermal walls is clearly expressed in monocotyledons.

== History ==
The discovery of the Casparian strip dates back to 1865, when the German botanist Robert Caspary first described the endodermis (Schutzscheide) of plant roots and a thickening of the endodermal cell wall. Later scholars named the thickening the Casparian strip, after Caspary. The term "Caspary'schen fleck" (German: Caspary'schen fleck) appeared in the 1870s literature, and after the 20th century, it was often called the Casparian strip. In 1903, Kroemer first isolated the Casparian strip from endodermal tissue using concentrated sulfuric acid to dissolve the surrounding cell wall material.

== Composition ==
The chemical composition of the Casparian strip had been long debated since its discovery. Caspary suggested that it was composed of either lignin or suberin. Subsequent studies produced conflicting results partly because suberin is also deposited in the endodermal cell wall as suberin lamellae during the secondary stage of endodermal differentiation. (Note: After the endodermal cell walls in the mature root form a Casparian strip, its main function can change from diverting water and dissolved salts into the symplast to defense. Only channel cells retain transport function. Some plants lose channel cells in the root as the root matures.) It was not until the 1990s after analyzing the Casparian strip of several plants that lignin was determined to be the main component. The Casparian strip forms after primary differentiation, and the secondary differentiation begins with the slash cut of the root, not where the Casparian strip is.

== Function ==
The Casparian strip is fully filled with the gap between endodermis cells, including the middle lamella, making the cell walls of the two cells almost fused. In the transportation of water and inorganic nutrients at the root of plants, the Casparian strip mainly affects the transportation of primary in vitro, that is, the transportation of water and inorganic salts through the interstitial cells of the epidermis and cortex cells. When water and inorganic salt come to the endodermal cells, they need to enter the cell through the cell membrane because the Casparian strip is not water-permeable, and then transported by the protoplasmic inner path to reach the lignan cells of the stele, and then to other organs such as the stems and leaves. When the growth environment is unfavourable, the Casparian strip can act as a barrier between plant cells and the outside world, avoiding the entry of ions or outflow of their own ions in the environment. In addition, the thickening of the carcass belt and the cortex also prevents toxic substances or pathogen invasion, as well as the function of preventing water dispersion. Some studies have shown that plants may form thicker Casparian strip in high-salt environments, and in areas closer to the tip of the roots, which may be an adaptation to the environment, but compared with the endodermal sublevel differentiated wooden bolt walls, which are significantly thickened in high-salt adversity, the Casparian strip changes is smaller.

The Casparian strip is mainly located in the endodermis of the root, but some plants also have the Casparian strip in the outer cortex on the outer side of the root cortex, stem or leaf. For example, the conifers of Pinus bungeana and the stems of Pelargonium have the Casparian strip, which may be related to preventing water dispersion or pathogenic invasion.

== Development ==
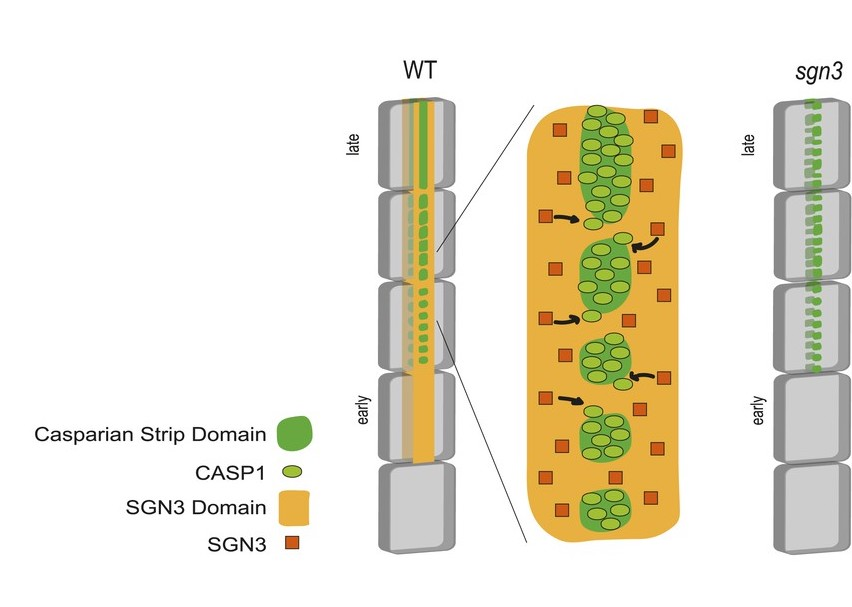
Radical and discontinuous Casparian strip of mutant plants lacking GSO1 (SGN3) receptors

The development of the Casparian strip is started after the endogenic cells are fully delayed, and there is currently two news signal transduction that promote endodermal cell formation of Casparian strip. The first is transcription factor Short-root (SHR) Activated additional two transcription factors Myb36 and Scarecrow (SCR), the former can stimulate Casparian Strip Proteins (Casp1-5), Peroxidase (PER64) and ESB1 (Enhanced) Suberin 1), etc., the latter affects the position of the Casparian strip in the inner skin cell, which causes the position of the Casparian strip to be too close to the Stele; the second is medium Casparian Strip Integrity Factor (CIF1-2) and the GSO1 (SGN3) and GSO2 receptor bonded to the endodermal cell radial wall and the GSO2 receptor in the lateral wall. CASP in the cells is concentrated to a cell membrane region corresponding to the position of the Casparian strip, forming a Casparian Strip Membrane Domain (CSD), and the CSD is incorporated in the region. The GS01 receptor is surrounded by the edge of each CSD region, promoting CSD fused into a continuous strip region, that is, the region where the Casparian strip is to be formed.

Casparian strip protein is a membrane protein that interacts with each other and can bind to proteins needed to synthesize lignin such as PER64, ESB1 and respiratory oxidase homologer F (RBOHF) to activate the downstream reaction of Casparian strip development. In mutant plants lacking GSO1 receptors or at the same time lacking CIF1 and CIF2 polypeptides, CASP1 is abnormally distributed on the endodermal cell membrane, and the CSD cannot normally fuse into a continuous and complete band structure, thus eventually forming a broken and discontinuous Casparian strip.

Environmental factors such as light, soil salinity and water deficit can affect the development of the Casparian strip.

== Photo ==
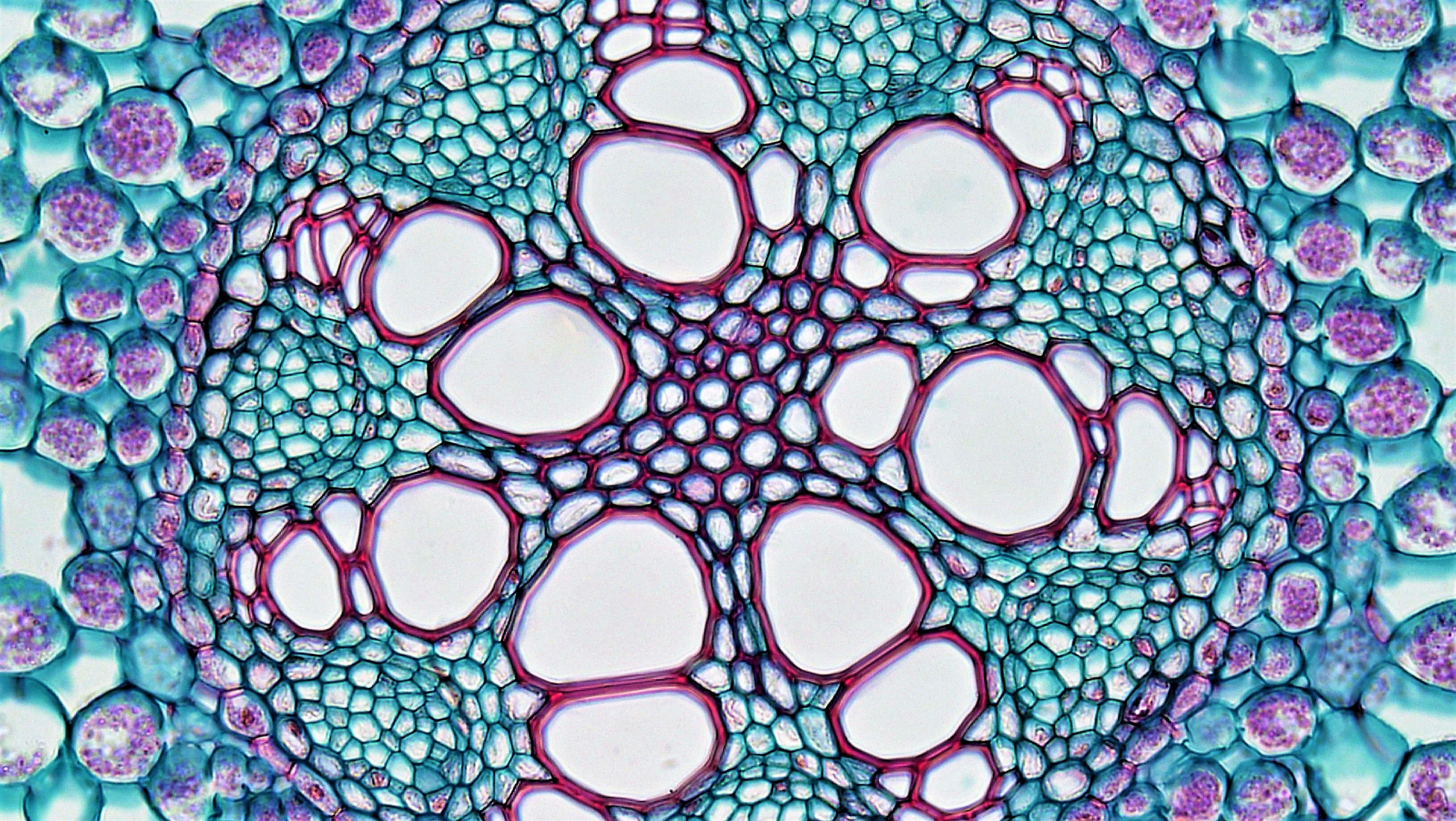
The vascular bundles of the root of the genus Acorus (monocotyledons) can be seen in the endodermis and the Casparian strip around the middle column. The Casparian strip is dyed red because it contains lignin.

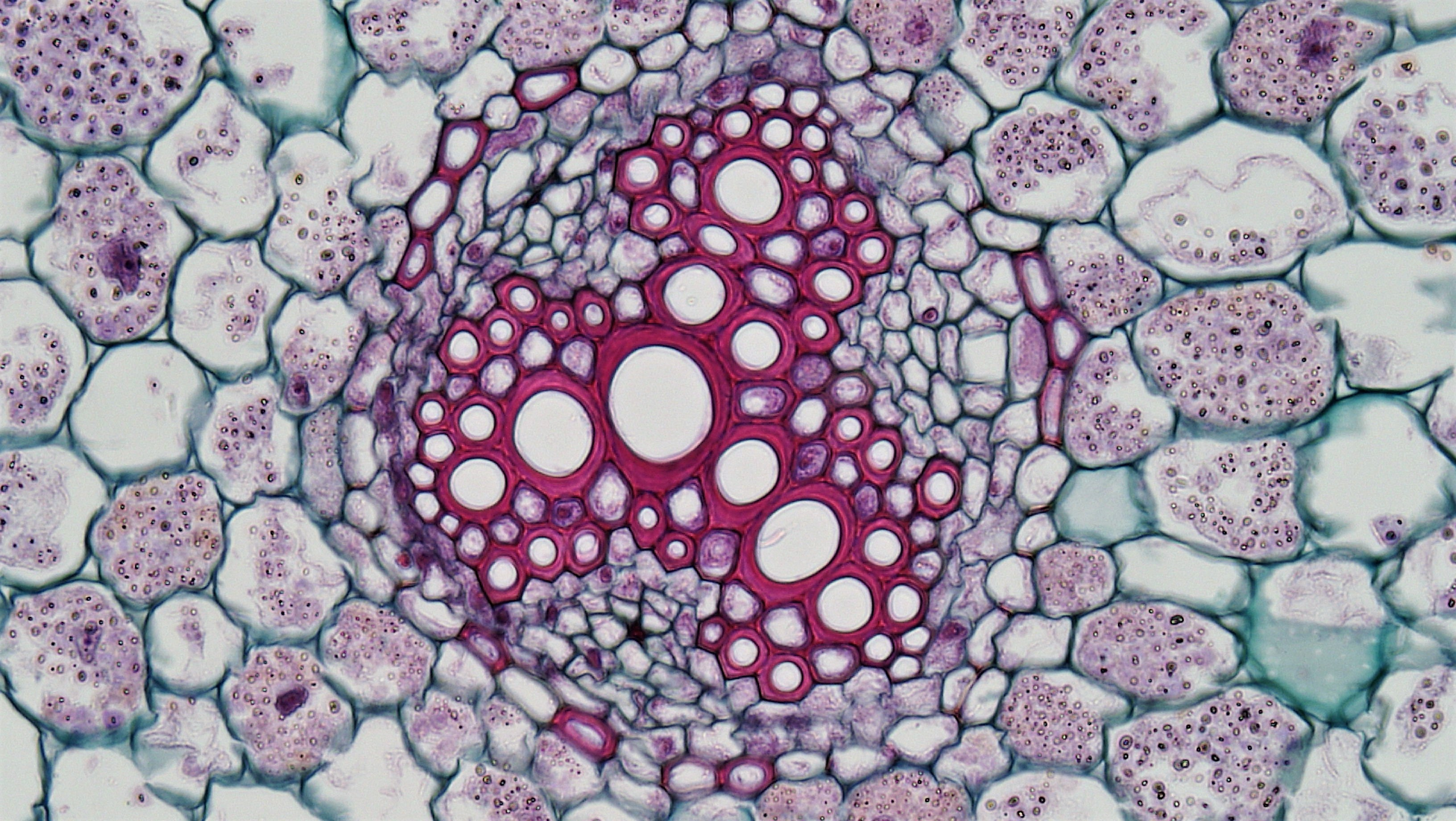
The vascular bundle of the root of the genus Ranunculus (dicotyledon) can see the endodermis and the Casparian strip around the middle column. The Casparian strip is dyed red because it contains lignin.

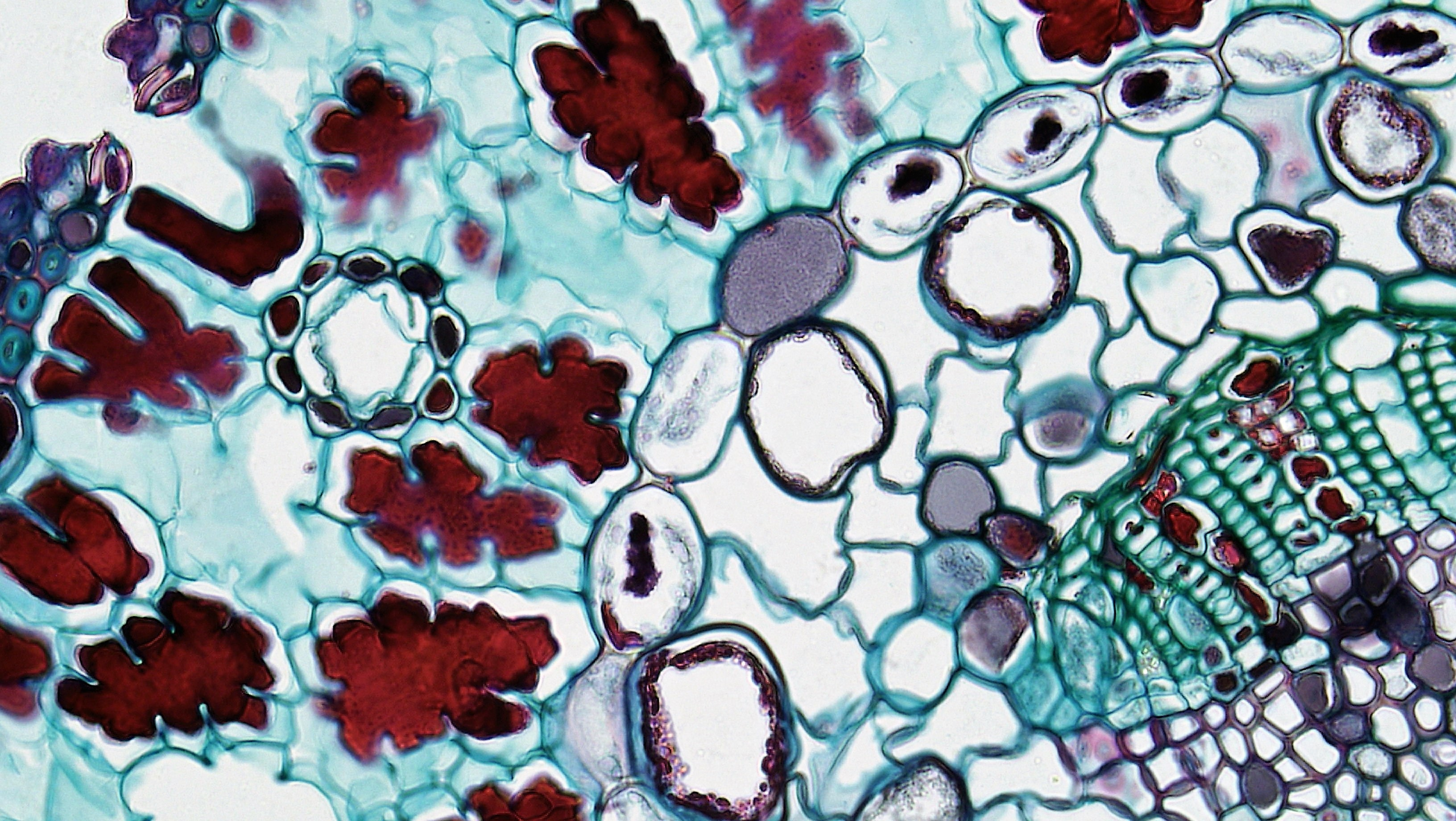
A Pinaceae (Gymnosperm) coniferous leaves. Peripheral endodermis and Casparian strip of visible vascular bundles

== See also ==
- Suberin
- Endodermis
- Exodermis
