= Pressure flow hypothesis =

Explains movement of sap through the phloem of plants

The pressure flow hypothesis, also known as the mass flow hypothesis, is the best-supported theory to explain the movement of sap through the phloem of plants. It was proposed in 1930 by Ernst Münch, a German plant physiologist. Organic molecules such as sugars, amino acids, certain hormones, and messenger RNAs are known to be transported in the phloem through the cells called sieve tube elements. According to the hypothesis, the high concentration of organic substances, particularly sugar, inside the phloem at a source such as a leaf creates a diffusion gradient (osmotic gradient) that draws water into the cells from the adjacent xylem. This creates turgor pressure, also called hydrostatic pressure, in the phloem. The hypothesis states that this is why sap in plants flows from the sugar producers (sources) to sugar absorbers (sinks).

== Sugar sources and sinks ==
A sugar source is any part of the plant that is producing or releasing sugar. During the plant's growth period, usually during the spring, storage organs such as the roots are sugar sources, and the plant's many growing areas are sugar sinks. After the growth period, when the meristems are dormant, the leaves are sources, and storage organs are sinks. Developing seed-bearing organs (such as fruit) are always sinks.

== Mechanism ==
While the movement of water and minerals through the xylem is usually driven by negative pressures (tension), movement through the phloem is driven by turgor pressure and an osmotic pressure gradient between the source and the sink. Cells in a sugar source actively transport sucrose molecules into the companion cells. The sucrose then diffuses through the plasmodesmata from the companion cells to the sieve tube elements. As a result, the concentration of sucrose increases in the sieve tube elements. This causes water to move into the sieve tube element by osmosis, creating pressure that pushes the sap down the tube. In sugar sinks, cells actively transport sucrose out of the sieve tube elements, first to the apoplast and then to the symplast of the sink. The phloem sugar is consumed by cellular respiration or converted into starch, which is insoluble and exerts no osmotic effect. With much of the sucrose having been removed, the water exits the phloem by osmosis or is drawn by transpiration into nearby xylem vessels, lowering the turgor pressure within the phloem. The sucrose concentration in sieve tubes is typically 10–30% in the leaves but only 0.5% in the photosynthesis cells. The gradient of sugar from source to sink causes pressure flow through the sieve tube toward the sink. The presence of sieve plates greatly increases the resistance along the pathway, thereby generating and maintaining substantial pressure gradients in the sieve elements between source and sink.

The movement in phloem is multi-directional, unlike in xylem cells, where the flow is upwards only. Because of this multi-directional flow, coupled with the fact that sap cannot easily move between adjacent sieve tubes, it is not unusual for sap in adjacent sieve tubes to flow in opposite directions.

== Evidence ==
Various evidence supports the hypothesis. Firstly, there is an excretion of solution from the phloem when the stem is cut or punctured by the stylet of an aphid, indicating that the phloem sap is under pressure. Secondly, concentration gradients of organic solutes are proven to be present between the sink and the source. Additionally, when viruses or growth chemicals are applied to an actively photosynthesising leaf, they are translocated downwards to the roots. When applied to shaded leaves, such downward translocation of chemicals does not occur, showing that diffusion is not a possible process involved in translocation.

== Criticisms ==
The hypothesis has been criticised. Some argue that mass flow is a passive process, while sieve tube vessels are supported by companion cells. Thus, the hypothesis neglects the living nature of phloem. Moreover, amino acids and sugars (examples of organic solutes) are translocated at different rates, contrary to the hypothesis’s assumption that all materials being transported would travel at a uniform speed.

One criticism of the pressure flow mechanism is that it does not explain the phenomenon of bidirectional movement i.e. simultaneous movement of different substances in opposite directions. The phenomenon of bidirectional movement has been demonstrated by applying two different substances at the same time to the phloem of a stem at two different points, and following their longitudinal movement along the stem. If the mechanism of translocation operates according to pressure flow hypothesis, bidirectional movement in a single sieve tube is not possible. Experiments to demonstrate bidirectional movement in a single sieve tube are very technically difficult to perform. Some experiments indicate that bidirectional movement may occur in a single sieve tube, whereas others do not. The bidirectional movement of solutes in the translocation process and the fact that translocation is heavily affected by changes in environmental conditions like temperature and metabolic inhibitors are two defects of the hypothesis.

== Other theories ==
Some plants appear not to load phloem by active transport. In these cases, a mechanism known as the polymer trap mechanism was proposed by Robert Turgeon. In this model, small sugars such as sucrose move into intermediary cells through narrow plasmodesmata, where they are polymerised to raffinose and other larger oligosaccharides. As larger molecules, they are unable to move back but can proceed through wider cell wall channels (plasmodesmata) into the sieve tube element.

This symplastic phloem loading is confined mostly to plants in tropical rainforests and is seen as more primitive. The actively transported apoplastic phloem loading is viewed as more advanced, as it is found in the later-evolved plants, particularly those in temperate and arid conditions. This mechanism may therefore have allowed plants to colonise the cooler locations.
