= Vascular =

Vascular may refer to:

- Blood vessels, the vascular system in animals
- Vascular tissue, the transport system in plants
