= Endodermis =

Inner layer of cortex in vascular plant roots

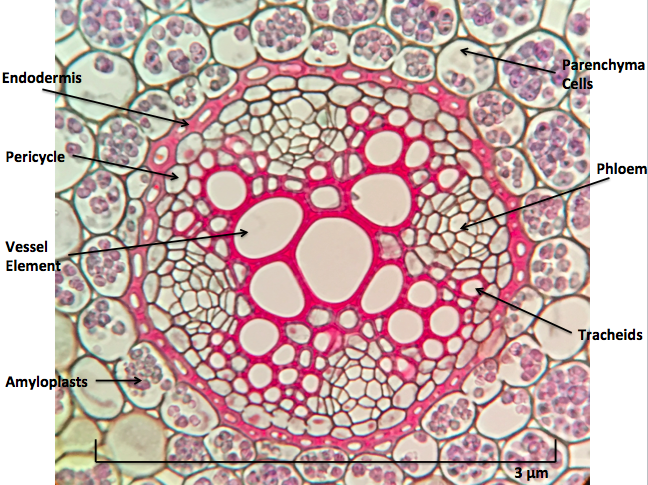
Ranunculus Root Cross Section

The endodermis is the innermost layer of cortex in vascular plants. It is a cylinder of compact living cells, the radial walls of which are impregnated with hydrophobic substances (Casparian strip) to restrict apoplastic flow of water to the inside. The endodermis is the boundary between the cortex and the stele.

In many seedless plants, such as ferns, the endodermis is a distinct layer of cells immediately outside the vascular cylinder (stele) in roots and shoots. In most seed plants, especially woody types, the endodermis is present in roots but not in stems.

The endodermis helps regulate the movement of water, ions and hormones into and out of the vascular system. It may also store starch, be involved in perception of gravity and protect the plant against toxins moving into the vascular system.

== Structure ==
The endodermis is developmentally the innermost portion of the cortex. It may consist of a single layer of barrel-shaped cells without any intercellular spaces or sometimes several cell layers. The cells of the endodermis typically have their primary cell walls thickened on four sides radial and transverse with suberin, a water-impermeable waxy substance which in young endodermal cells is deposited in distinctive bands called Casparian strips. These strips vary in width but are typically smaller than the cell wall on which they are deposited. If the endodermis is likened to a brick cylinder (e.g. a smokestack), with the bricks representing individual cells, the Casparian strips are analogous to the mortar between the bricks. In older endodermal cells, suberin may be more extensively deposited on all cell wall surfaces and the cells can become lignified, forming a complete waterproof layer.

Some plants have a large number of amyloplasts (starch containing organelles) in their endodermal cells, in which case the endodermis may be called a starch sheath.

Endodermis is often made visible with stains like phloroglucinol due to the phenolic and lipid nature of the Casparian strips or by the abundance of amyloplasts.

== Function ==
The endodermis prevents water, and any solutes dissolved in the water, from passing through this layer via the apoplast pathway. Water can only pass through the endodermis by crossing the membrane of endodermal cells twice (once to enter and a second time to exit). Water moving into or out of the xylem, which is part of the apoplast, can thereby be regulated since it must enter the symplast in the endodermis. This allows the plant to control to some degree the movement of water and to selectively uptake or prevent the passage of ions or other molecules.

The endodermis does not allow gas bubbles to enter the xylem and helps prevent embolisms from occurring in the water column.

Passage cells are endodermal cells of older roots which have retained thin walls and Casparian strips rather than becoming suberized and waterproof like the other cells around them, to continue to allow some symplastic flow to the inside. Experimental evidence suggests that passage cells function to allow transfer of solutes such as calcium and magnesium into the stele, in order to eventually reach the transpiration system. For the most part, however, old roots seal themselves off at the endodermis, and only serve as a passageway for water and minerals taken up by younger roots "downstream".

Endodermal cells may contain starch granules in the form of amyloplasts. These may serve as food storage, and have been shown to be involved in gravitropism in some plants.

== See also ==
- Suberin
- Exodermis
- Epidermis
