= Suberin =

Hydrophobic lipid polyester in plant cell walls

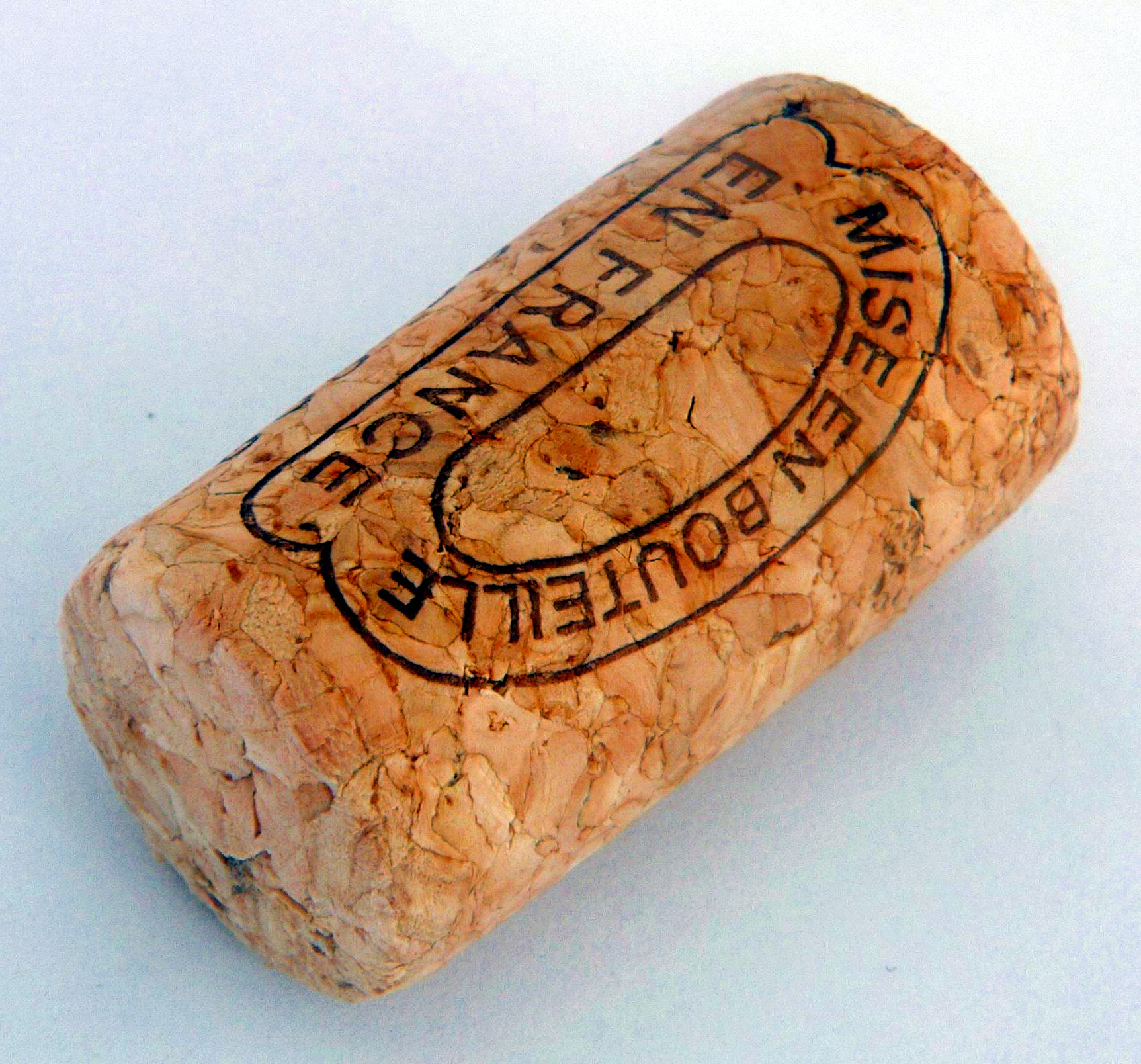
Cork is rich in suberin, which provides its hydrophobic properties

Suberin is a lipophilic, complex polyester biopolymer found in plants. It is composed of long-chain fatty acids (called suberin acids) and glycerol. Suberin is interconnected with cutin and lignin and forms a protective barrier in the epidermal and peridermal cell walls of higher plants. Suberin and lignin are considered covalently linked to lipids and carbohydrates respectively. Lignin is again covalently linked to suberin, and to a lesser extent to cutin, thus constructing a complex macromolecular matrix. Suberin is a major constituent of cork, and is named after the cork oak, Quercus suber. Its main function is as a barrier to movement of water and solutes.

== Anatomy and physiology ==
Suberin is highly hydrophobic and a somewhat 'rubbery' material. In roots, suberin is deposited in the radial and transverse/tangential cell walls of the endodermal cells. This structure, known as the Casparian strip or Casparian band, functions to prevent water and nutrients taken up by the root from entering the stele through the apoplast. Instead, water must bypass the endodermis via the symplast. This allows the plant to select the solutes that pass further into the plant. It thus forms an important barrier to harmful solutes. For example, mangroves use suberin to minimize salt intake from their littoral habitat.

Suberin is found in the phellem layer of the periderm (or cork). This is the outermost layer of the bark. The cells in this layer are dead and abundant in suberin, preventing water loss from the tissues below. Suberin can also be found in various other plant structures. For example, they are present in the lenticels on the stems of many plants and the net structure in the rind of a netted melon is composed of suberised cells.

== Structure and biosynthesis ==
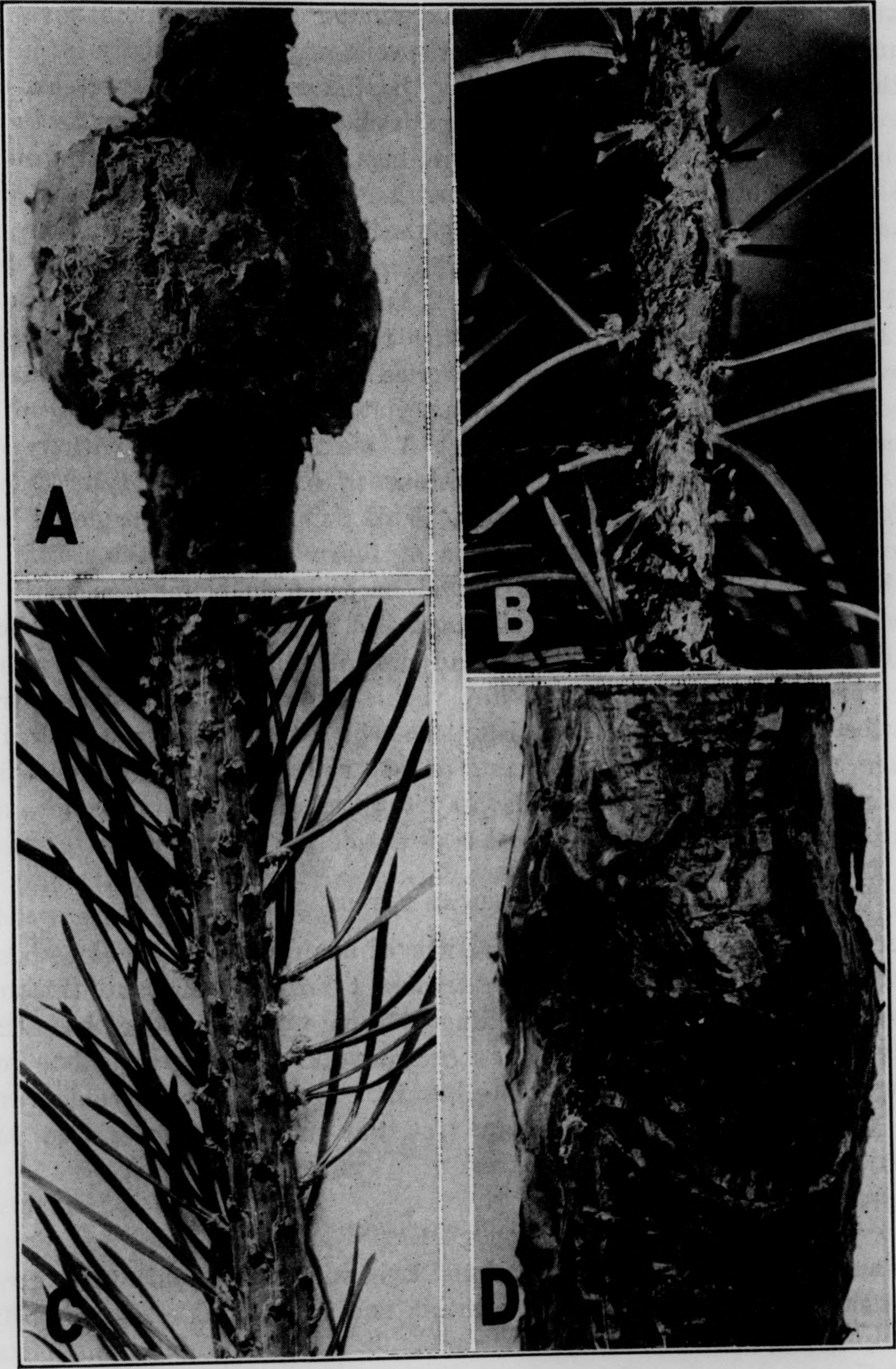
Suberin is contained in the bark of pine trees

Suberin consists of two domains, a polyaromatic and a polyaliphatic domain. The polyaromatics are predominantly located within the primary cell wall, and the polyaliphatics are located between the primary cell wall and the cell membrane. The two domains are supposed to be cross-linked. The exact qualitative and quantitative composition of suberin monomers varies in different species. Some common aliphatic monomers include α-hydroxyacids (mainly 18-hydroxyoctadec-9-enoic acid) and α,ω-diacids (mainly octadec-9-ene-1,18-dioic acid). The monomers of the polyaromatics are hydroxycinnamic acids and derivatives, such as feruloyltyramine.

In addition to the aromatic and aliphatic components, glycerol has been reported a major suberin component in some species. The role of glycerol is proposed to interlink aliphatic monomers, and possibly also to link polyaliphatics to polyaromatics, during suberin polymer assembly. The polymerization step of aromatic monomers has been shown to involve a peroxidase reaction.

The biosynthesis of the aliphatic monomers shares the same upstream reactions with cutin biosynthesis, and the biosynthesis of aromatics shares the same upstream reactions with lignin biosynthesis.

Phlobaphen also occurs in the polyaromatic part of the suberin mixture.

== See also ==
- Suberic acid – a monomeric unit within suberin.
- Suberinic acid – a term that is used to describe a mixture of predominantly long-chain fatty acids, found in the bark of Betula trees.
