= Abscission =

Shedding of various parts of an organism

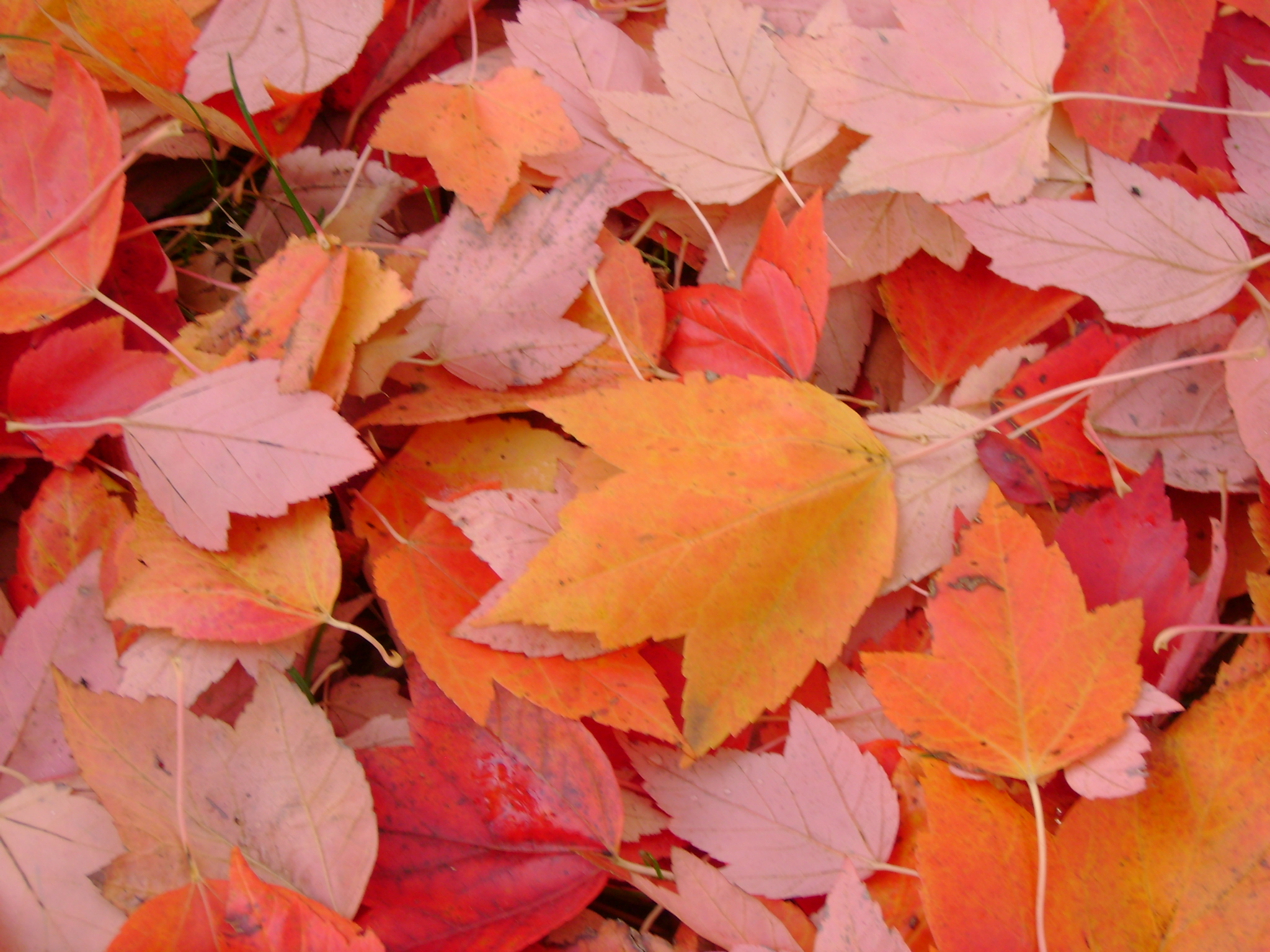
Leaf litter on the forest floor. Annual autumn leaf drop in temperate zones is caused by the abscission of the mature leaves from the growth season in response to the approach of cold winter weather.

Abscission (from Latin ab- 'away' and scindere 'to cut') is the shedding of various parts of an organism, such as a plant dropping a leaf, fruit, flower, or seed. In zoology, abscission is the intentional shedding of a body part, such as the shedding of a claw, husk, or the autotomy of a tail to evade a predator. In mycology, it is the liberation of a fungal spore. In cell biology, abscission refers to the separation of two daughter cells at the completion of cytokinesis.

== In plants ==
=== Function ===
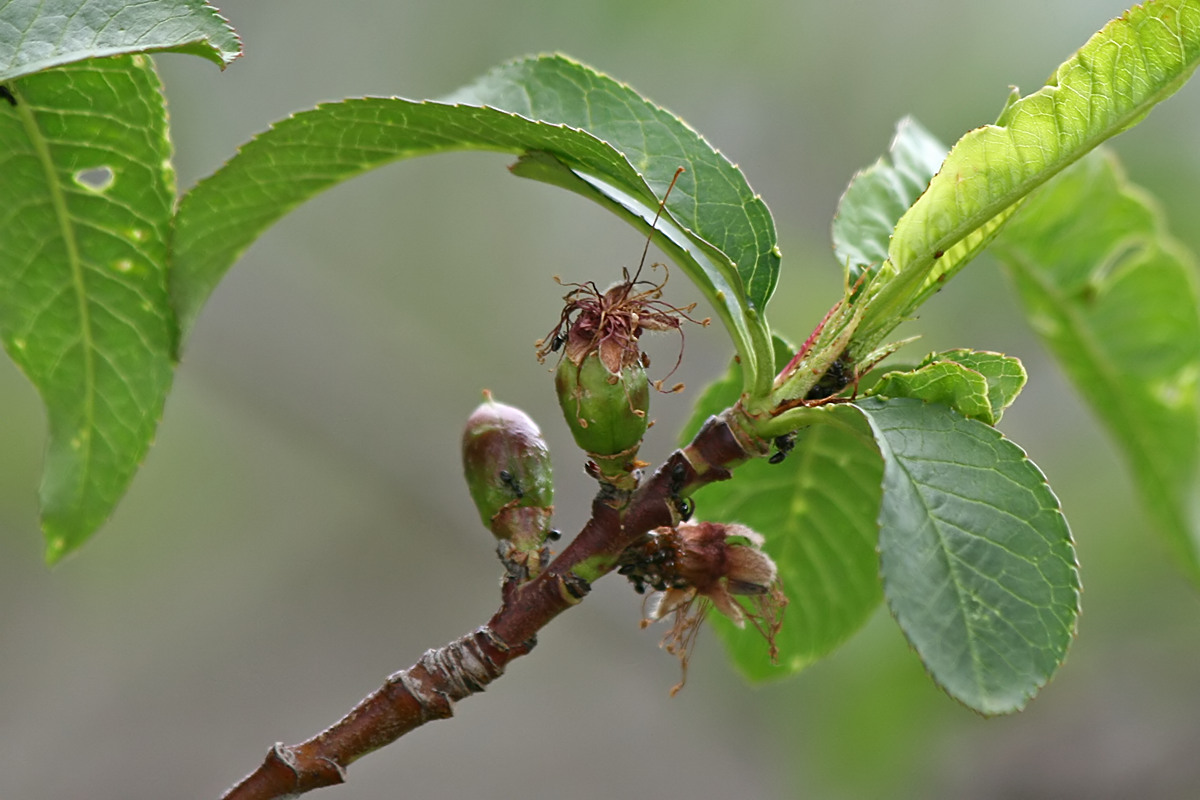
Abscission of the hypanthium during development of a nectarine fruit

A plant will abscise a part either to discard a member that is no longer necessary, such as a leaf during autumn, or a flower following fertilisation, or for the purposes of reproduction. Most deciduous plants drop their leaves by abscission before winter, whereas evergreen plants continuously abscise their leaves. Another form of abscission is fruit drop, when a plant abscises fruit while still immature in order to conserve resources needed to bring the remaining fruit to maturity. If a leaf is damaged, a plant may also abscise it to conserve water or photosynthetic efficiency, depending on the 'costs' to the plant as a whole. The abscission layer is a greenish-greyish color.

Abscission can also occur in premature leaves as a means of plant defense. Premature leaf abscission has been shown to occur in response to infestation by gall aphids. By abscising leaves that have been made host to aphid galls, plants have been shown to massively diminish the pest population, as 98% of aphids in abscised galls died. The abscission is selective, and the chance of dropping leaves increases as the number of galls increases. A leaf with three or more galls was four times more likely to abscise than a leaf with one, and 20 times as likely to be dropped as a leaf without any galls.

=== Process ===
Abscission occurs in a sequence of three steps: resorption, protective layer formation, and detachment. The latter two steps may occur in either order, depending on species.

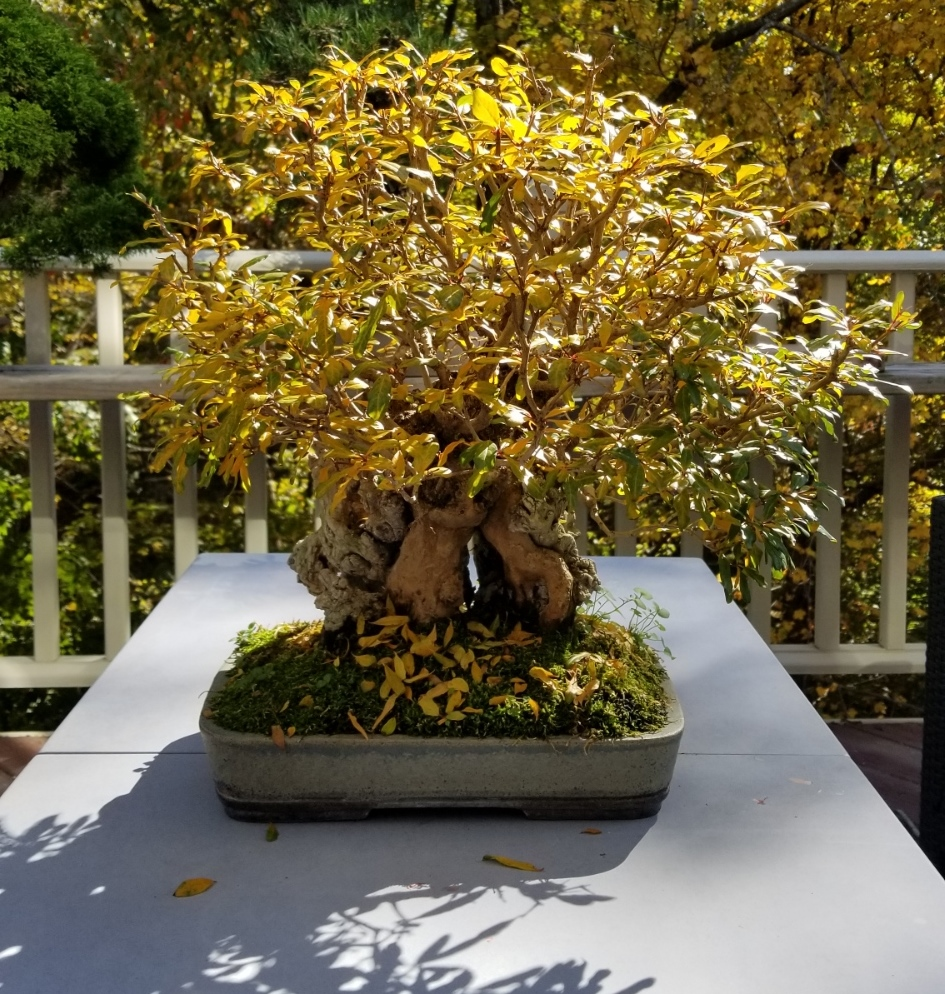
This Pomegranate bonsai is going through abscission in the fall. After resorption of nutrients in preparation for winter, the yellowed leaves die off and drop.

==== Resorption ====
Resorption involves degrading chlorophyll to extract the majority of its nutrients. Nitrogen is found in chlorophyll and is often a limiting nutrient for plants, which need large quantities to form amino acids, nucleic acids, proteins, and certain plant hormones. Once nitrogen and other nutrients have been extracted from chlorophyll, the nutrients will travel to other tissues of the plant. Resorption is what causes leaves in the fall to change colors. Carotenoids in the leaves are slower to degrade than chlorophyll, so autumn leaves appear yellow and orange.

==== Protective layer formation ====
Cells under the abscission zone divide and form a layer of cork cells. Situated on both sides of the abscission zone are layers of parenchyma cells, which produce and inject suberin and lignin under the abscission zone into the new layer of cork cells. Suberin and lignin create a durable and waterproof layer for the plant once the organ is detached.

==== Detachment ====
This step can occur in a variety of ways depending on the species but always occurs at the abscission zone. Detachment can occur when layers of parenchyma cells secrete cell wall enzymes to self-digest the middle lamella, which holds the cell walls together at the abscission zone. This causes the cells of the abscission zone to break apart and the leaf or other plant part to fall off. Another way detachment occurs is through imbibition of water. The plant cells at the abscission zone will take in a large amount of water, swell, and eventually burst, making the organ fall off. Once detached, the protective layer of cork will be exposed.

=== Mechanisms ===
==== Structural ====
In deciduous trees, an abscission zone, also called a separation zone, is formed at the base of the petiole. It is composed of a top layer that has cells with weak walls, and a bottom layer that expands in the autumn, breaking the weak walls of the cells in the top layer. This allows the leaf to be shed.

==== Lack of chlorophyll as a trigger ====
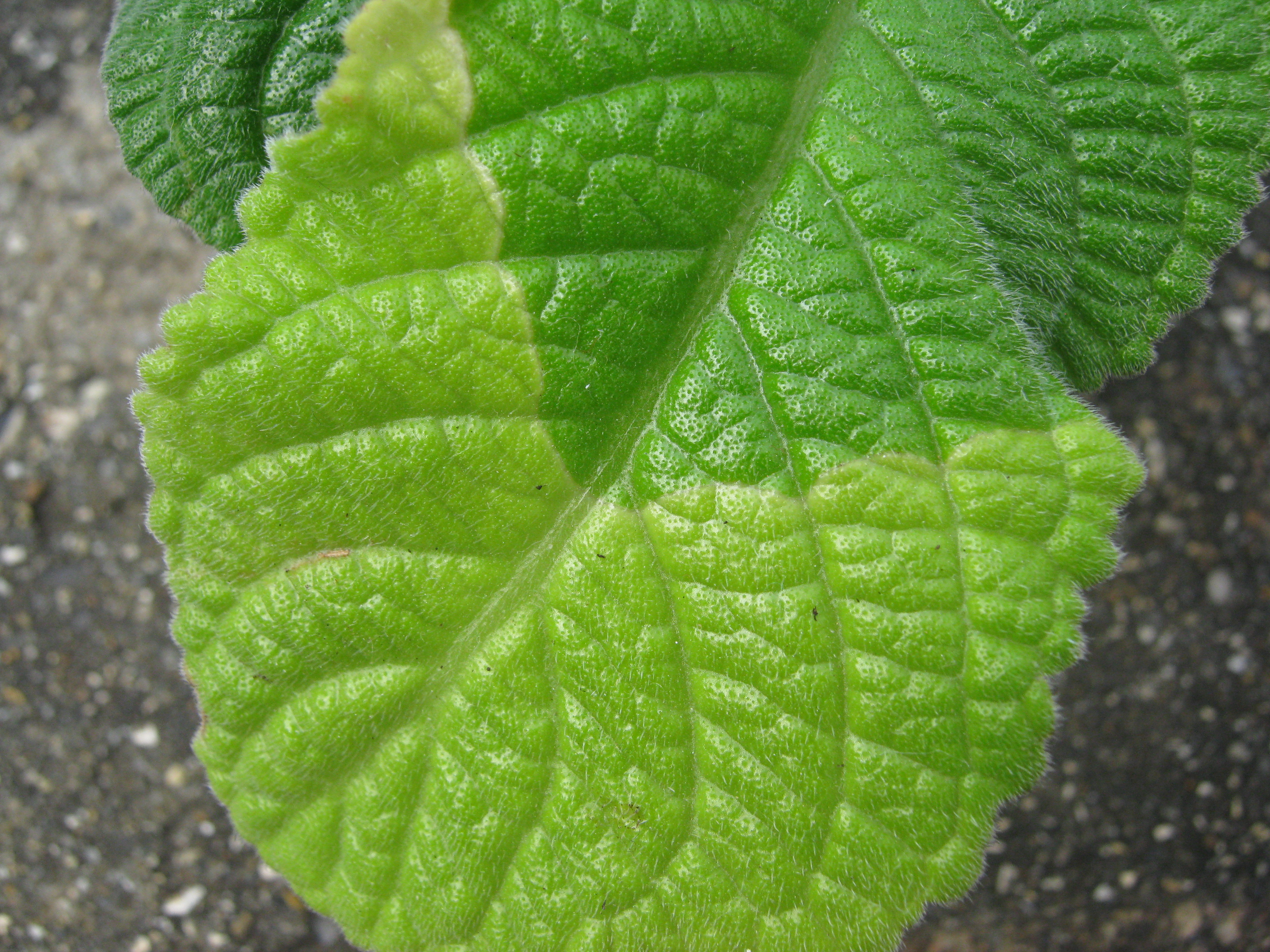
Streptocarpus sp. leaf showing abscission line in response to reduced day length

The reduction of chlorophyll production in leaves due to decreased sunlight in the autumn explains why some leaves turn yellow. However, the yellow color can attract aphids, so some trees turn the leaves red instead by injecting a bright pigment. The loss of chlorophyll may also contribute to the abscission process.

==== Chemical ====
A variety of reactive oxygen species (ROS) are generated by plants during times of stress (biotic and abiotic), including UV light, cool temperatures, excessive light, pathogens, parasites, and high salinity. The presence and continuous production of these ROS causes disruption in the homeostasis of the cellular components, leading to metabolic dysfunction and expression of cell wall-degrading enzymes (WDEs).

==== Hormonal ====
While researchers originally believed abscisic acid to be the hormone that stimulates abscission (for which the hormone was named), it was later proved that it does not play a primary role. In fact, auxin, a plant hormone, and ethylene have been implicated as prominent regulators of abscission signaling. The two compounds work in a synergistic fashion: As the auxin levels decrease, the flux of auxin to the abscission zone is reduced. Exhaustion of auxin makes the abscission zone sensitive to ethylene. When the plant is then exposed to ethylene, gene expression of cell wall-degrading enzymes such as cellulase and polygalacturonase are activated. However, this is not to say that ethylene directly activates WDE gene expression, because the elements responsible for detecting ethylene have not been found in the gene's promoter region. Dwindling auxin levels have also been implicated in autumn-leaf color change.

== See also ==
- Marcescence, the retention of normally shed plant parts
- Deciduous
