= Cell wall =

Outermost layer of some cells

Cell biology
- Plant cell diagram
- Components of a typical plant cell: a. Plasmodesmata b. Plasma membrane c. Cell wall: 1. Chloroplast; d. Thylakoid membrane e. Starch grain: 2. Vacuole; f. Vacuole g. Tonoplast h. Mitochondrion i. Peroxisome j. Cytoplasm k. Small membranous vesicles l. Rough endoplasmic reticulum: 3. Nucleus; m. Nuclear pore n. Nuclear envelope o. Nucleolus p. Ribosome q. Smooth endoplasmic reticulum r. Golgi vesicles s. Golgi apparatus (Golgi body) t. Cytoskeleton

A cell wall is a structural layer that surrounds some cell types, found immediately outside the cell membrane. It can be tough, flexible, and sometimes rigid. Primarily, it provides the cell with structural support, shape, protection, and functions as a selective barrier. Another vital role of the cell wall is to help the cell withstand osmotic pressure and mechanical stress. Cell walls are found in most prokaryotes, with the exception of mollicute bacteria. Among the eukaryotes, cells walls are prevalent in fungi, algae and plants but absent from animals and many other taxa.

The composition of cell walls varies across taxonomic groups, species, cell type, and the cell cycle. In land plants, the primary cell wall comprises polysaccharides like cellulose, hemicelluloses, and pectin. Often, other polymers such as lignin, suberin or cutin are anchored to or embedded in plant cell walls. Algae exhibit cell walls composed of glycoproteins and polysaccharides, such as carrageenan and agar, distinct from those in land plants. Bacterial cell walls contain peptidoglycan, while archaeal cell walls vary in composition, potentially consisting of glycoprotein S-layers, pseudopeptidoglycan, or polysaccharides. Fungi possess cell walls constructed from the polymer chitin, specifically N-acetylglucosamine. Diatoms have a unique cell wall composed of biogenic silica.

== History ==
A plant cell wall was first observed and named (simply as a "wall") by Robert Hooke in 1665. However, "the dead excrusion product of the living protoplast" was forgotten, for almost three centuries, being the subject of scientific interest mainly as a resource for industrial processing or in relation to animal or human health.

In 1804, Karl Rudolphi and J.H.F. Link proved that cells had independent cell walls. Before, it had been thought that cells shared walls and that fluid passed between them this way.

The mode of formation of the cell wall was controversial in the 19th century. Hugo von Mohl (1853, 1858) advocated the idea that the cell wall grows by apposition. Carl Nägeli (1858, 1862, 1863) believed that the growth of the wall in thickness and in area was due to a process termed intussusception. Each theory was improved in the following decades: the apposition (or lamination) theory by Eduard Strasburger (1882, 1889), and the intussusception theory by Julius Wiesner (1886).

In 1930, Ernst Münch coined the term apoplast in order to separate the "living" symplast from the "dead" plant region, the latter of which included the cell wall.

By the 1980s, some authors suggested replacing the term "cell wall", particularly as it was used for plants, with the more precise term "extracellular matrix", as used for animal cells, but others preferred the older term.

== Properties ==
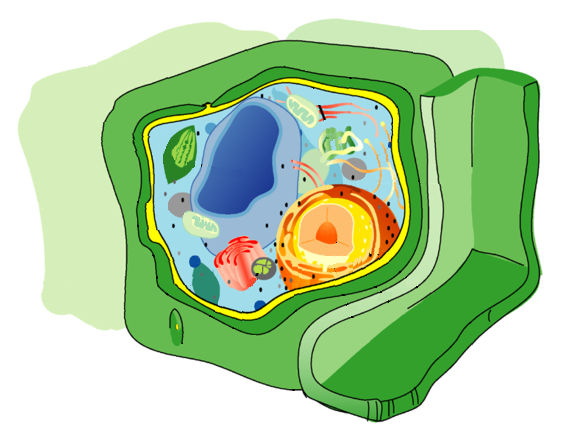
Diagram of the plant cell, with the cell wall in green.

Cell walls serve similar purposes in those organisms that possess them. They may give cells rigidity and strength, offering protection against mechanical stress. The chemical composition and mechanical properties of the cell wall are linked with plant cell growth and morphogenesis. In multicellular organisms, they permit the organism to build and hold a definite shape. Cell walls also limit the entry of large molecules that may be toxic to the cell. They further permit the creation of stable osmotic environments by preventing osmotic lysis and helping to retain water. Their composition, properties, and form may change during the cell cycle and depend on growth conditions.

=== Rigidity of cell walls ===
In most cells, the cell wall is flexible, meaning that it will bend rather than holding a fixed shape, but has considerable tensile strength. The apparent rigidity of primary plant tissues is enabled by cell walls, but is not due to the walls' stiffness. Hydraulic turgor pressure creates this rigidity, along with the wall structure. The flexibility of the cell walls is seen when plants wilt, so that the stems and leaves begin to droop, or in seaweeds that bend in water currents. As John Howland explains

Think of the cell wall as a wicker basket in which a balloon has been inflated so that it exerts pressure from the inside. Such a basket is very rigid and resistant to mechanical damage. Thus does the prokaryote cell (and eukaryotic cell that possesses a cell wall) gain strength from a flexible plasma membrane pressing against a rigid cell wall.

The apparent rigidity of the cell wall thus results from inflation of the cell contained within. This inflation is a result of the passive uptake of water.

== Evolution ==
Cell walls evolved independently in many groups. The photosynthetic eukaryotes (plants and algae) have cellulose cell walls, where the cell wall is closely related to the evolution of multicellularity, terrestrialization and vascularization. The CesA cellulose synthase evolved in Cyanobacteria and was part of Archaeplastida since endosymbiosis; secondary endosymbiosis events transferred it (with the arabinogalactan proteins) further into brown algae and oomycetes. Plants later evolved various genes from CesA, including the Csl (cellulose synthase-like) family of proteins and additional Ces proteins. Combined with the various glycosyltransferases (GT), they enable more complex chemical structures to be built.

Fungi use a chitin-glucan-protein cell wall. They share the 1,3-β-glucan synthesis pathway with plants, using homologous GT48 family 1,3-Beta-glucan synthases to perform the task, suggesting that such an enzyme is very ancient within the eukaryotes. Their glycoproteins are rich in mannose. The cell wall might have evolved to deter viral infections. Proteins embedded in cell walls are variable, contained in tandem repeats subject to homologous recombination. An alternative scenario is that fungi started with a chitin-based cell wall and later acquired the GT-48 enzymes for the 1,3-β-glucans via horizontal gene transfer. The pathway leading to 1,6-β-glucan synthesis is not sufficiently known in either case.

== Plant cell walls ==
The walls of plant cells must have sufficient tensile strength to withstand internal osmotic pressures of several times atmospheric pressure that result from the difference in solute concentration between the cell interior and external solutions. Plant cell walls vary from 0.1 to several μm in thickness.

In plants, a secondary cell wall is a thicker additional layer of cellulose which increases wall rigidity. Additional layers may be formed by lignin in xylem cell walls, or suberin in cork cell walls. These compounds are rigid and waterproof, making the secondary wall stiff. Both wood and bark cells of trees have secondary walls. Other parts of plants such as the leaf stalk may acquire similar reinforcement to resist the strain of physical forces.

The primary cell wall of most plant cells is freely permeable to small molecules including small proteins, with size exclusion estimated to be 30–60 kDa. The pH is an important abiotic factor governing the transport of molecules through cell walls.

=== Layers ===
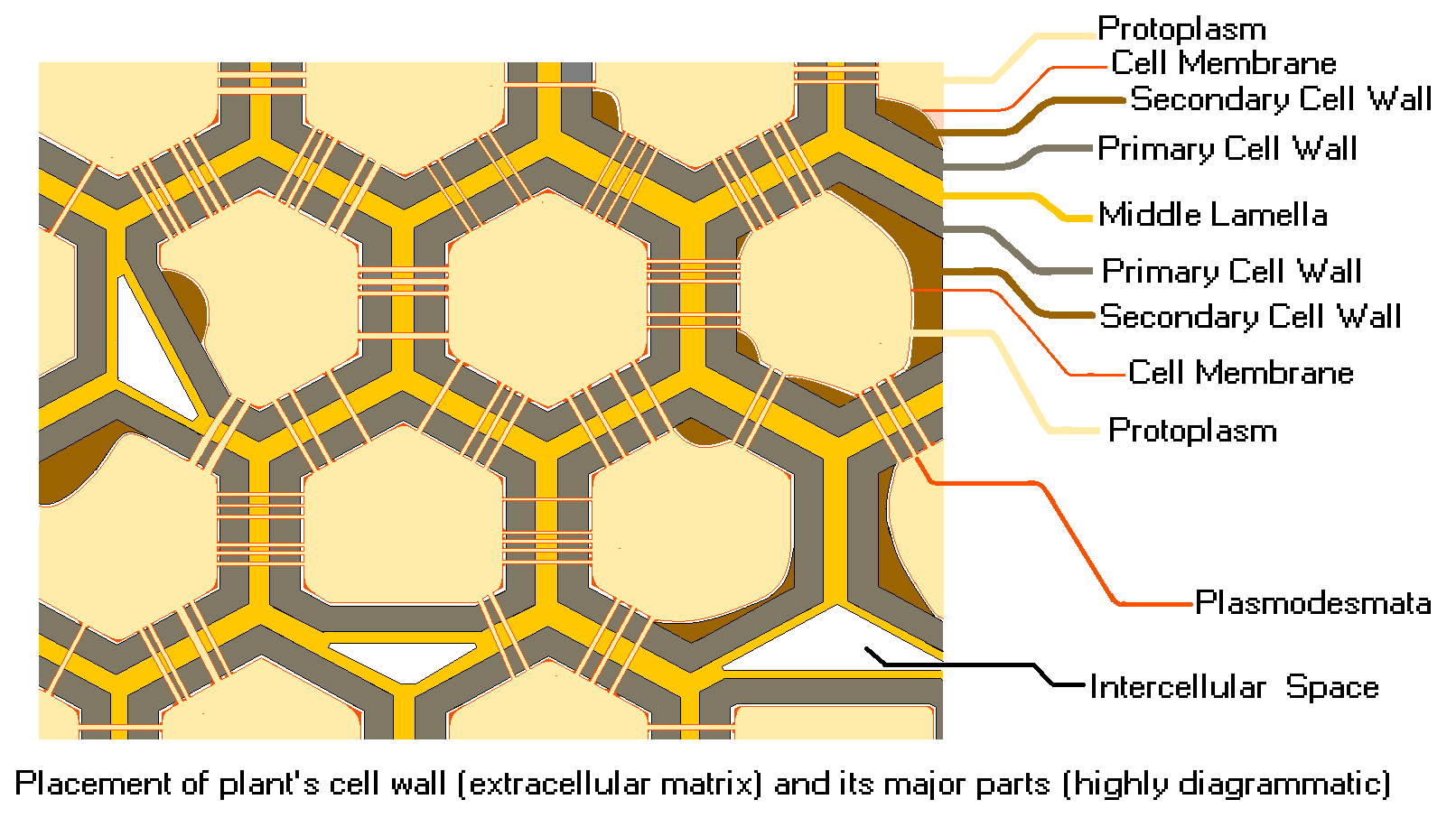
Cell wall in multicellular plants – its different layers and their placement with respect to protoplasm (highly diagrammatic)

Molecular structure of the primary cell wall in plants

Up to three strata or layers may be found in plant cell walls:

- The primary cell wall, generally a thin, flexible and extensible layer formed while the cell is growing.
- The secondary cell wall, a thick layer formed inside the primary cell wall after the cell is fully grown. It is not found in all cell types. Some cells, such as the conducting cells in xylem, possess a secondary wall containing lignin, which strengthens and waterproofs the wall.
- The middle lamella, a layer rich in pectins. This outermost layer forms the interface between adjacent plant cells and glues them together.

=== Composition ===
In the primary (growing) plant cell wall, the major carbohydrates are cellulose, hemicellulose and pectin. The cellulose microfibrils are linked via hemicellulosic tethers to form the cellulose-hemicellulose network, which is embedded in the pectin matrix. The most common hemicellulose in the primary cell wall is xyloglucan. In grass cell walls, xyloglucan and pectin are reduced in abundance and partially replaced by glucuronoarabinoxylan, another type of hemicellulose. Primary cell walls characteristically extend (grow) by a mechanism called acid growth, mediated by expansins, extracellular proteins activated by acidic conditions that modify the hydrogen bonds between pectin and cellulose. This functions to increase cell wall extensibility. The outer part of the primary cell wall of the plant epidermis is usually impregnated with cutin and wax, forming a permeability barrier known as the plant cuticle.

Secondary cell walls contain a wide range of additional compounds that modify their mechanical properties and permeability. The major polymers that make up wood (largely secondary cell walls) include:

- cellulose, 35-50%
- xylan, 20-35%, a type of hemicellulose
- lignin, 10-25%, a complex phenolic polymer that penetrates the spaces in the cell wall between cellulose, hemicellulose and pectin components, driving out water and strengthening the wall.

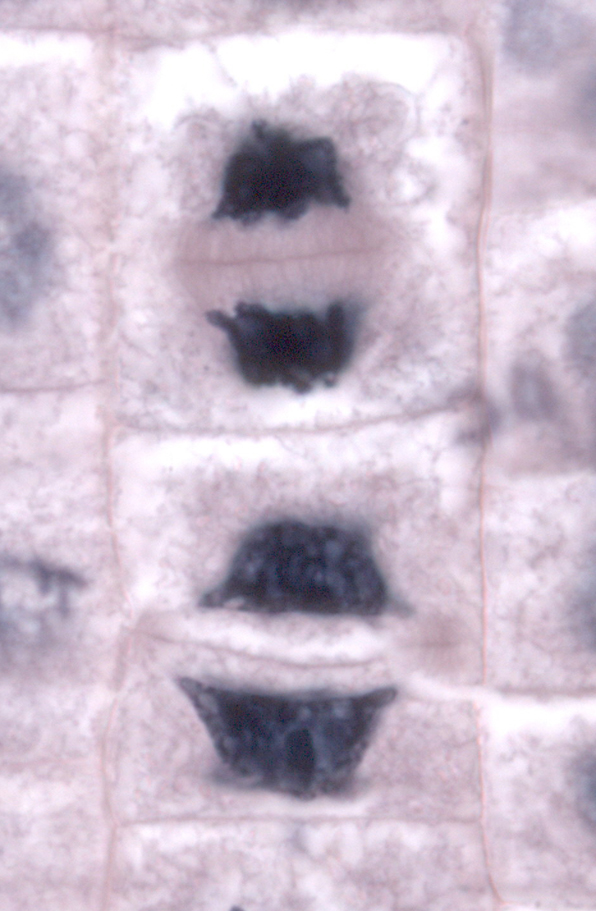
Photomicrograph of onion root cells, showing the centrifugal development of new cell walls (phragmoplast)

Additionally, structural proteins (1-5%) are found in most plant cell walls; they are classified as hydroxyproline-rich glycoproteins (HRGP), arabinogalactan proteins (AGP), glycine-rich proteins (GRPs), and proline-rich proteins (PRPs). Each class of glycoprotein is defined by a characteristic, highly repetitive protein sequence. Most are glycosylated, contain hydroxyproline (Hyp) and become cross-linked in the cell wall. These proteins are often concentrated in specialized cells and in cell corners. Cell walls of the epidermis may contain cutin. The Casparian strip in the endodermis roots and cork cells of plant bark contain suberin. Both cutin and suberin are polyesters that function as permeability barriers to the movement of water. The relative composition of carbohydrates, secondary compounds and proteins varies between plants and between the cell type and age. Plant cells walls also contain numerous enzymes, such as hydrolases, esterases, peroxidases, and transglycosylases, that cut, trim and cross-link wall polymers.

Secondary walls - especially in grasses - may also contain microscopic silica crystals, which may strengthen the wall and protect it from herbivores.

Cell walls in some plant tissues also function as storage deposits for carbohydrates that can be broken down and resorbed to supply the metabolic and growth needs of the plant. For example, endosperm cell walls in the seeds of cereal grasses, nasturtium and other species, are rich in glucans and other polysaccharides that are readily digested by enzymes during seed germination to form simple sugars that nourish the growing embryo.

=== Formation ===
The middle lamella is laid down first, formed from the cell plate during cytokinesis, and the primary cell wall is then deposited inside the middle lamella. The actual structure of the cell wall is not clearly defined and several models exist - the covalently linked cross model, the tether model, the diffuse layer model and the stratified layer model. However, the primary cell wall, can be defined as composed of cellulose microfibrils aligned at all angles. Cellulose microfibrils are produced at the plasma membrane by the cellulose synthase complex, which is proposed to be made of a hexameric rosette that contains three cellulose synthase catalytic subunits for each of the six units. Microfibrils are held together by hydrogen bonds to provide a high tensile strength. The cells are held together and share the gelatinous membrane (the middle lamella), which contains magnesium and calcium pectates (salts of pectic acid). Cells interact though plasmodesmata, which are inter-connecting channels of cytoplasm that connect to the protoplasts of adjacent cells across the cell wall.

In some plants and cell types, after a maximum size or point in development has been reached, a secondary wall is constructed between the plasma membrane and primary wall. Unlike the primary wall, the cellulose microfibrils are aligned parallel in layers, the orientation changing slightly with each additional layer so that the structure becomes helicoidal. Cells with secondary cell walls can be rigid, as in the gritty sclereid cells in pear and quince fruit. Cell to cell communication is possible through pits in the secondary cell wall that allow plasmodesmata to connect cells through the secondary cell walls.

== Fungal cell walls ==
Chemical structure of a unit from a chitin polymer chain

There are several groups of organisms that have been called "fungi". Some of these groups (Oomycete and Myxogastria) have been transferred out of the Kingdom Fungi, in part because of fundamental biochemical differences in the composition of the cell wall. Most true fungi have a cell wall consisting largely of chitin and other polysaccharides. True fungi do not have cellulose in their cell walls.

In fungi, the cell wall is the outer-most layer, external to the plasma membrane. The fungal cell wall is a matrix of three main components:

- chitin: polymers consisting mainly of unbranched chains of β-(1,4)-linked-N-Acetylglucosamine in the Ascomycota and Basidiomycota, or poly-β-(1,4)-linked-N-Acetylglucosamine (chitosan) in the Zygomycota. Both chitin and chitosan are synthesized and extruded at the plasma membrane.
- glucans: glucose polymers that function to cross-link chitin or chitosan polymers. β-glucans are glucose molecules linked via β-(1,3)- or β-(1,6)- bonds and provide rigidity to the cell wall while α-glucans are defined by α-(1,3)- and/or α-(1,4) bonds and function as part of the matrix.
- proteins: enzymes necessary for cell wall synthesis and lysis in addition to structural proteins are all present in the cell wall. Most of the structural proteins found in the cell wall are glycosylated and contain mannose, thus these proteins are called mannoproteins or mannans.

== Other eukaryotic cell walls ==
=== Algae ===
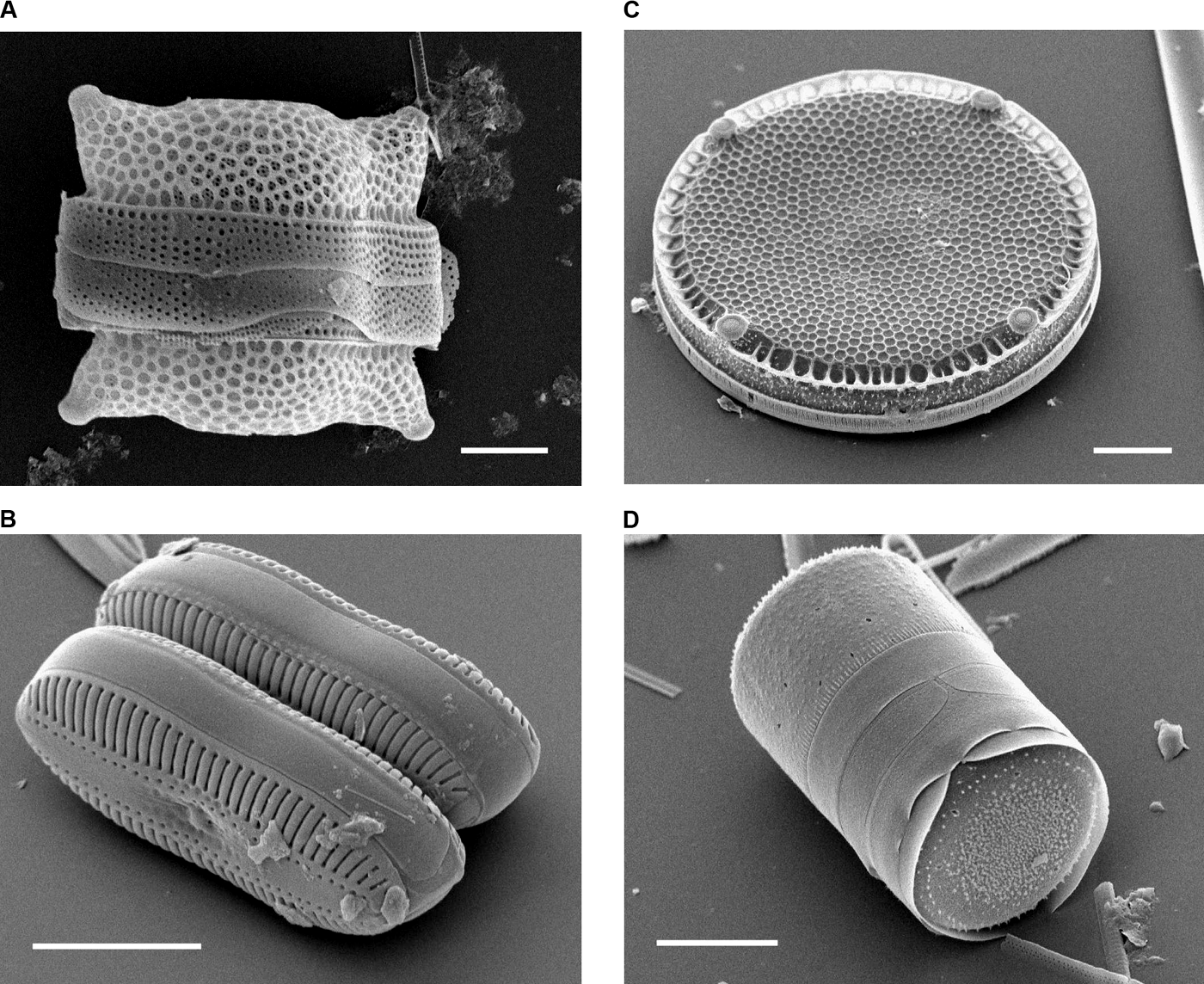
Scanning electron micrographs of diatoms showing the external appearance of the cell wall

Like plants, algae have cell walls. Algal cell walls contain either polysaccharides (such as cellulose (a glucan)) or a variety of glycoproteins (Volvocales) or both. The inclusion of additional polysaccharides in algal cells walls is used as a feature for algal taxonomy.

- Mannans: They form microfibrils in the cell walls of a number of marine green algae including those from the genera, Codium, Dasycladus, and Acetabularia as well as in the walls of some red algae, like Porphyra and Bangia.
- Xylans:
- Alginic acid: It is a common polysaccharide in the cell walls of brown algae.
- Sulfonated polysaccharides: They occur in the cell walls of most algae; those common in red algae include agarose, carrageenan, porphyran, furcelleran and funoran.

Other compounds that may accumulate in algal cell walls include sporopollenin and calcium ions.

The group of algae known as the diatoms synthesize their cell walls (also known as frustules or valves) from silicic acid. Significantly, relative to the organic cell walls produced by other groups, silica frustules require less energy to synthesize (approximately 8%), potentially a major saving on the overall cell energy budget and possibly an explanation for higher growth rates in diatoms.

In brown algae, phlorotannins may be a constituent of the cell walls.

=== Water molds ===
The group Oomycetes, also known as water molds, are saprotrophic plant pathogens like fungi. Until recently they were widely believed to be fungi, but structural and molecular evidence has led to their reclassification as heterokonts, related to autotrophic brown algae and diatoms. Unlike fungi, oomycetes typically possess cell walls of cellulose and glucans rather than chitin, although some genera (such as Achlya and Saprolegnia) do have chitin in their walls. The fraction of cellulose in the walls is no more than 4 to 20%, far less than the fraction of glucans. Oomycete cell walls also contain the amino acid hydroxyproline, which is not found in fungal cell walls.

=== Slime molds ===
The dictyostelids are another group formerly classified among the fungi. They are slime molds that feed as unicellular amoebae, but aggregate into a reproductive stalk and sporangium under certain conditions. Cells of the reproductive stalk, as well as the spores formed at the apex, possess a cellulose wall. The spore wall has three layers, the middle one composed primarily of cellulose, while the innermost is sensitive to cellulase and pronase.

== Prokaryotic cell walls ==
=== Bacterial cell walls ===
Illustration of a typical gram-positive bacterium. The cell envelope comprises a plasma membrane, seen here in light brown, and a thick peptidoglycan-containing cell wall (the purple layer). No outer lipid membrane is present, as would be the case in gram-negative bacteria. The red layer, known as the capsule, is distinct from the cell envelope.

Around the outside of the cell membrane is the bacterial cell wall. Bacterial cell walls are made of peptidoglycan (also called murein), which is made from polysaccharide chains cross-linked by D-peptides (unusual peptides containing D-amino acids). Bacterial cell walls are different from the cell walls of plants and fungi which are made of cellulose and chitin, respectively. The cell wall of bacteria is also distinct from that of Archaea, which do not contain peptidoglycan. The cell wall is essential to the survival of many bacteria, although L-form bacteria can be produced in the laboratory that lack a cell wall. The antibiotic penicillin is able to kill bacteria by preventing the cross-linking of peptidoglycan and this causes the cell wall to weaken and lyse. The lysozyme enzyme can also damage bacterial cell walls.

There are broadly speaking two different types of cell wall in bacteria, called gram-positive and gram-negative. The names originate from the reaction of cells to the Gram stain, a test long-employed for the classification of bacterial species.

Gram-positive bacteria possess a thick cell wall containing many layers of peptidoglycan and teichoic acids.

Gram-negative bacteria have a relatively thin cell wall consisting of a few layers of peptidoglycan surrounded by a second lipid membrane containing lipopolysaccharides and lipoproteins. Most bacteria have the gram-negative cell wall and only the Bacillota and Actinomycetota (previously known as the low G+C and high G+C gram-positive bacteria, respectively) have the alternative gram-positive arrangement.

These differences in structure produce differences in antibiotic susceptibility. The beta-lactam antibiotics (e.g. penicillin, cephalosporin) only work against gram-negative pathogens, such as Haemophilus influenzae or Pseudomonas aeruginosa. The glycopeptide antibiotics (e.g. vancomycin, teicoplanin, telavancin) only work against gram-positive pathogens such as Staphylococcus aureus

=== Archaeal cell walls ===
Although not truly unique, the cell walls of Archaea are unusual. Whereas peptidoglycan is a standard component of all bacterial cell walls, all archaeal cell walls lack peptidoglycan, though some methanogens have a cell wall made of a similar polymer called pseudopeptidoglycan. There are four types of cell wall currently known among the Archaea.

One type of archaeal cell wall is that composed of pseudopeptidoglycan (also called pseudomurein). This type of wall is found in some methanogens, such as Methanobacterium and Methanothermus. While the overall structure of archaeal pseudopeptidoglycan superficially resembles that of bacterial peptidoglycan, there are a number of significant chemical differences. Like the peptidoglycan found in bacterial cell walls, pseudopeptidoglycan consists of polymer chains of glycan cross-linked by short peptide connections. However, unlike peptidoglycan, the sugar N-acetylmuramic acid is replaced by N-acetyltalosaminuronic acid, and the two sugars are bonded with a β,1-3 glycosidic linkage instead of β,1-4. Additionally, the cross-linking peptides are L-amino acids rather than D-amino acids as they are in bacteria.

A second type of archaeal cell wall is found in Methanosarcina and Halococcus. This type of cell wall is composed entirely of a thick layer of polysaccharides, which may be sulfated in the case of Halococcus. Structure in this type of wall is complex and not fully investigated.

A third type of wall among the Archaea consists of glycoprotein, and occurs in the hyperthermophiles, Halobacterium, and some methanogens. In Halobacterium, the proteins in the wall have a high content of acidic amino acids, giving the wall an overall negative charge. The result is an unstable structure that is stabilized by the presence of large quantities of positive sodium ions that neutralize the charge. Consequently, Halobacterium thrives only under conditions with high salinity.

In other Archaea, such as Methanomicrobium and Desulfurococcus, the wall may be composed only of surface-layer proteins, known as an S-layer. S-layers are common in bacteria, where they serve as either the sole cell-wall component or an outer layer in conjunction with polysaccharides. Most Archaea are Gram-negative, though at least one Gram-positive member is known.

== Other cell coverings ==
Many protists and bacteria produce other cell surface structures apart from cell walls, external (extracellular matrix) or internal. Many algae have a sheath or envelope of mucilage outside the cell made of exopolysaccharides. Diatoms build a frustule from silica extracted from the surrounding water; radiolarians, foraminiferans, testate amoebae and silicoflagellates also produce a skeleton from minerals, called test in some groups. Many green algae, such as Halimeda and the Dasycladales, and some red algae, the Corallinales, encase their cells in a secreted skeleton of calcium carbonate. In each case, the wall is rigid and essentially inorganic. It is the non-living component of cell. Some golden algae, ciliates and choanoflagellates produces a shell-like protective outer covering called lorica. Some dinoflagellates have a theca of cellulose plates, and coccolithophorids have coccoliths.

An extracellular matrix (ECM) is also present in metazoans. Its composition varies between cells, but collagens are the most abundant protein in the ECM.
