= Suberinic acid =

Chemical structure of octadecane-1,18-dioic acid, a typical component of the suberinic acids

Suberinic acids are a type of carboxylic acids naturally encountered in the bark of Betula tree species. Chemically, they predominantly have long (C18) chains with α- and ω- bifunctional saturated and unsaturated fatty acid ends. Their name originates from suberin, a major chemical biopolymer of tree bark.

== Uses ==
The outer bark of birch (Betula spp.) tree is abundant in betulin. Upon extracting betulin, the remaining material consists of tissues containing suberin. Suberin is a biopolyester composed of α,ω - bifunctional fatty acids, namely the suberinic acids, which, along with lignocarbohydrate complexes, can serve as a potential adhesive in the form of a byproduct obtained during the extraction of suberinic acids for polyol synthesis. Recent studies have proved the potential application of this product, obtained by depolymerizing suberin, in the wood-based panels such as particleboard utilizing different solvents.

Recently, suberinic acids have found to have new applications in wood industry. The industrial mixture of suberinic acids, obtained from extracted birch outer bark, can be successfully used in industry for adhesion purposes, possibly in wood protection as well.
