= Middle lamella =

Part of a plant

Cell wall and middle lamella (top)

The middle lamella is a layer that cements together the primary cell walls of two adjoining plant cells. It is the first formed layer to be deposited at the time of cytokinesis. The cell plate that is formed during cell division itself develops into middle lamella or lamellum. The middle lamella is made up of calcium and magnesium pectates. In a mature plant cell it is the outermost layer of cell wall.

In plants, the pectins form a unified and continuous layer between adjacent cells. Frequently, it is difficult to distinguish the middle lamella from the primary wall, especially in cells that develop thick secondary walls. In such cases, the two adjacent primary walls and the middle lamella, and perhaps the first layer of the secondary wall of each cell, may be called a compound middle lamella. When the middle lamella is degraded by enzymes, as happens during fruit ripening and abscission, the adjacent cells will separate.

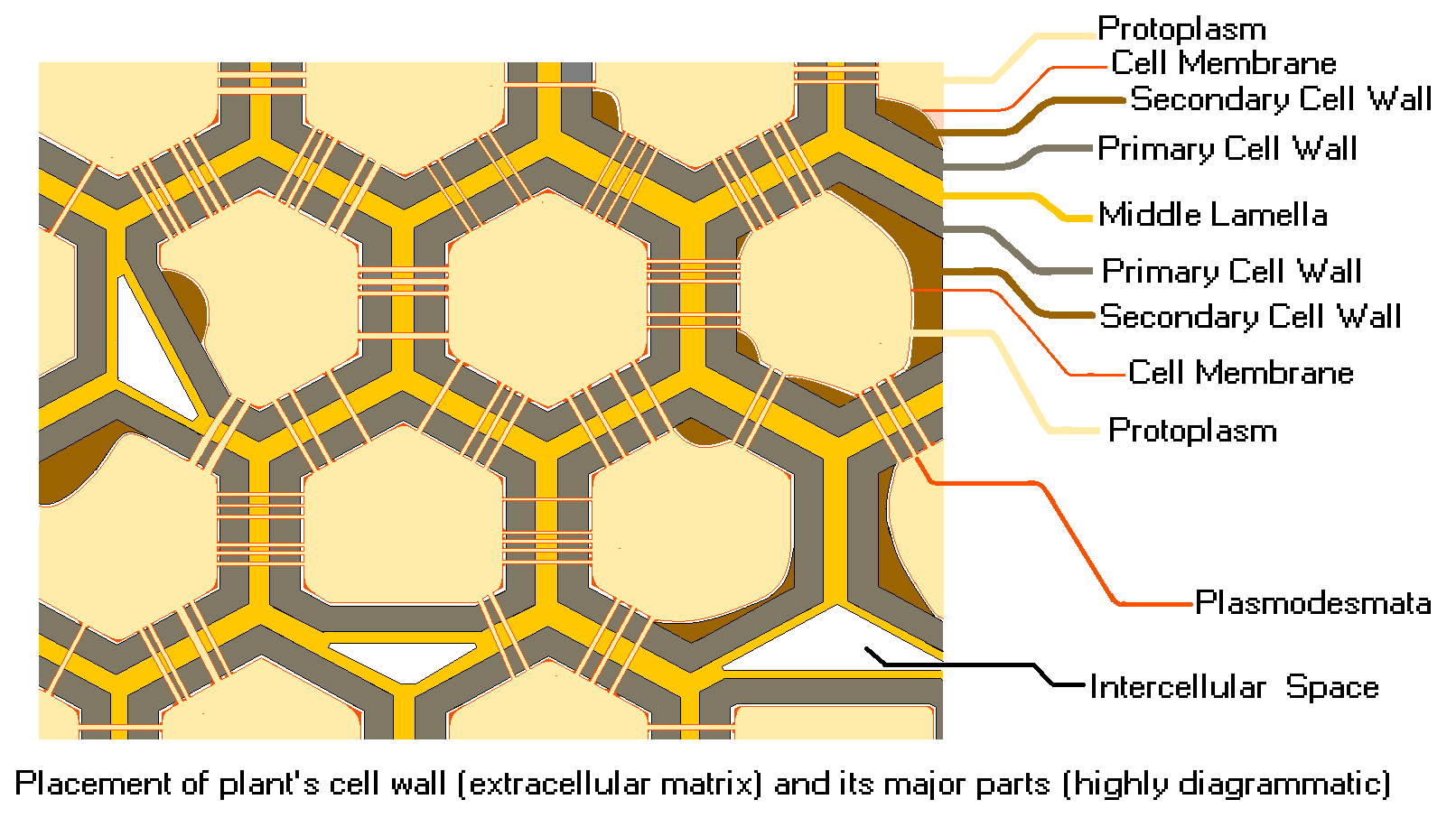
Placement of middle lamella in plant-tissue (highly diagrammatic)

== See also ==
- Cell wall
- Plasma membrane
