= Ernst Münch =

- Born: 26 November 1876; Ruchheim
- Died: 9 October 1946 (aged 69); Lechbruck
- Citizenship: German
- Known for: Pressure flow hypothesis
- Scientific career
- Fields: Botany
- Doctoral advisor: Karl von Tubeuf

Ernst Münch (26 November 1876 – 9 October 1946) was a German plant physiologist who proposed the pressure flow hypothesis in 1930.

He studied in Aschaffenburg, and then in Munich with Robert Hartig. He worked in a number of fields including forest pathology, resin production, and fungi. He is best known for the phloem pressure flow hypothesis.

== Works ==
- Untersuchungen über Immunität und Krankheitsempfänglichkeit der Holzpflanzen, Dissertation, Ludwigsburg 1909 (doctorate thesis)
- Die Stoffbewegungen in der Pflanze, Jena 1930
- Beiträge zur Forstpflanzenzüchtung. Versuche einer Auslesezüchtung durch Einzelstamm-Absaaten bei Fichte. Weitere Beiträge zur Forstpflanzenzüchtung [Aus dem wissenschaftlichen Nachlass herausgegeben von Bruno Huber], München 1949
