= Apoplast =

Extracellular space, outside the cell membranes of plants

The apoplastic and symplastic pathways

The apoplast is the network of cell walls, intercellular spaces, and xylem vessels in plants that allows the movement of water, ions, and small molecules outside the plasma membrane. It forms a continuous extracellular pathway, distinct from the symplast, which involves cytoplasmic transport through plasmodesmata. Water and solutes moving via the apoplast bypass the selective control of the plasma membrane, allowing rapid bulk flow across tissues.

The apoplast provides a low-resistance pathway for water to move from roots to leaves, complementing the symplastic route. Minerals dissolved in water can travel through the apoplast until they reach the endodermis, where the Casparian strip forces selective uptake into the symplast.

The apoplastic network, being part of the cell wall, contributes to mechanical strength and rigidity in plant tissues. The apoplast also serves as a frontline barrier against pathogens and facilitates the transport of signaling molecules between cells.

Also, root pressure and guttation: Movement through the apoplast contributes to root pressure buildup, especially at night when transpiration is low.

== Passive transport in the apoplast ==
Transport in the apoplast is generally passive, meaning it does not require energy ATP. This occurs because:

- Substances move along a concentration or pressure gradient, from areas of higher water or solute potential to lower potential.
- Water moves via osmosis and capillary action within cell walls and intercellular spaces.
- Ions and small molecules diffuse freely until they reach barriers like the Casparian strip, where selective, active transport may take over.

The apoplast is important for all the plant's interaction with its environment: The main carbon source (carbon dioxide) needs to be solubilized, which happens in the apoplast, before it diffuses through the cell wall and across the plasma membrane, into the cell's inner content, the cytoplasm, where it diffuses in the symplast to the chloroplasts for photosynthesis. In the roots, ions diffuse into the apoplast of the epidermis before diffusing into the symplast, or in some cases being taken up by specific ion channels, and being pulled by the plant's transpiration stream, which also occurs completely within the boundaries of the apoplast. Similarly, all gaseous molecules emitted and received by plants such as oxygen must pass through the apoplast.

In nitrate poor soils, acidification of the apoplast increases cell wall extensibility and root growth rate. This is believed to be caused by a decrease in nitrate uptake (due to deficit in the soil medium) and supplanted with an increase in chloride uptake. H+ATPase increases the efflux of H+, thus acidifying the apoplast.

The apoplast is a site for cell-to-cell communication. During local oxidative stress, hydrogen peroxide and superoxide anions can diffuse through the apoplast and transport a warning signal to neighbouring cells. In addition, a local alkalinization of the apoplast due to such stress can travel within minutes to the rest of the plant body via the xylem and trigger systemic acquired resistance.

The apoplast also plays an important role in resistance to aluminium toxicity.

In addition to resistance to chemicals, the apoplast provides the rich environment for microorganisms endophytes which arises[??] the abiotic resistance of plants. Exclusion of aluminium ions in the apoplast prevent toxic levels which inhibit shoot growth, reducing[?] crop yields.

== History ==
The term apoplast was coined in 1930 by Münch in order to separate the "living" symplast from the "dead" apoplast.

== Apoplastic transport ==
The apoplastic pathway is one of the two main pathways for water transport in plants, the other being symplastic pathway. In the root via the apoplast water and minerals flow in an upward direction to the xylem.

The concentration of solutes transported through the apoplast in aboveground organs is established through a combination of import from the xylem, absorption by cells, and export by the phloem.

Transport velocity is higher (transport is faster) in the apoplast than in the symplast. This method of transport also accounts for a higher proportion of water transport in plant tissues than does symplastic transport.

The apoplastic pathway is also involved in passive exclusion. Some of the ions that enter through the roots do not make it to the xylem. The ions are excluded by the cell walls (plasma membranes) of the endodermal cells.

== Apoplastic colonization ==
It is well known that the apoplast is rich in nutrients, and microorganisms accordingly thrive there. There is an apoplastic immune system, but pathogens with effectors can modulate or suppress the host’s immune responses. This is known as effector-triggered susceptibility. Another factor in pathogens’ frequent colonization of the apoplast is that when they enter from the leaves, the apoplast is the first thing they come across. Therefore, the apoplast is a popular biotic interface and also a reservoir for microbes. One common apoplastic disease appearing in plants without restricted habitat or climate is black rot, caused by the gram-negative bacteria Xanthomonas campestris.

Entophytic bacteria can cause severe problems in agriculture by alkalizing the apoplast with their volatiles and therefore inhibiting plant growth. In particular, the largest phytoyoxic component of the volatiles of rhizobacteria has been identified as 2-phenylethanol. 2-phenylethanol can influence the regulation of WRKY18, a transcription factor engaged in multiple plant hormones, one of which is abscisic acid (ABA) hormone. 2-phyenlethanol modulates the sensitivity of ABA through WRKY18 and WRKY40, but WRKY18 is the central mediator of the pathway of triggering cell death and modulation of ABA sensitivity influenced by 2-phyenlethanol. Therefore, it results in the inhibition of root growth, and the plants have no capacity to grow without having the roots absorb nutrients in soils.

However, the microbial colonization in the apoplast is not always harmful to the plants, indeed, it can be beneficial to establish a symbiotic relationship with the host. One of the examples is the endophytic and phyllosphere microbes can indirectly promote plant growth and protect the plant from other pathogens by inducing salicylic acid (SA)and jasmonic acid (JA) signaling pathways, and they are both parts of the pathogen associated molecular patterns triggered immunity (PTI). The productions of SA and JA hormones also modulate the ABA signaling to be the components on the defense gene expression, and there are a lot more responses with the involvement of other hormones to respond to different biotic and abiotic stress. In the experiment performed by Romero et al., they inoculated the known entophytic bacteria, Xanthomonas into Canola, a plant that grows in multiple habitats, and it is found its apoplastic fluids that are 99% identity to another bacteria, Pseudomonas viridiflava, by performing 16S rRNA sequences with the Genebank and reference strains. They further used the markers on the SA-responsive transcriptional factor and other specific genes such as lipoxygenase 3 as marker genes for JA signaling and ABA signaling to perform quantitative reverse-transcription PCR. It has shown Xanthomonas only activates the related gene of SA pathway, in comparison, Pseudomonas viridiflava is able to trigger the genes of both SA and JA pathway, which suggest Pseudomonas viridiflava originally in Canola can stimulate PTI by the accumulation of both signaling pathway to inhibit the growth of Xanthomonas. In conclusion, the apoplast acts as a crucial role in plants, involving in all kinds of regulations of hormone and transportation of nutrients, so once it has been colonized, the effect it brings cannot be neglected.

== See also ==
- Symplast
- Tonoplast
- Vacuolar pathway

== Notes ==
1. Apoplast was previously defined as "everything but the symplast, consisting of cell walls and spaces between cells in which water and solutes can move freely". However, since solutes can neither freely move through the air spaces between plant cells nor through the cuticle, this definition has been changed. When referring to "everything outside the plasma membrane", the term "extracellular space" is in use.
2. The word apoplasm is also in use with similar meaning as apoplast, although less common.

== Footnotes ==
- Salibury F; Ross C (1991). Plant Physiology. Brooks Cole. p. 682. ISBN 978-0-534-15162-1..
