= Vascular tissue =

Conducting tissue in vascular plants

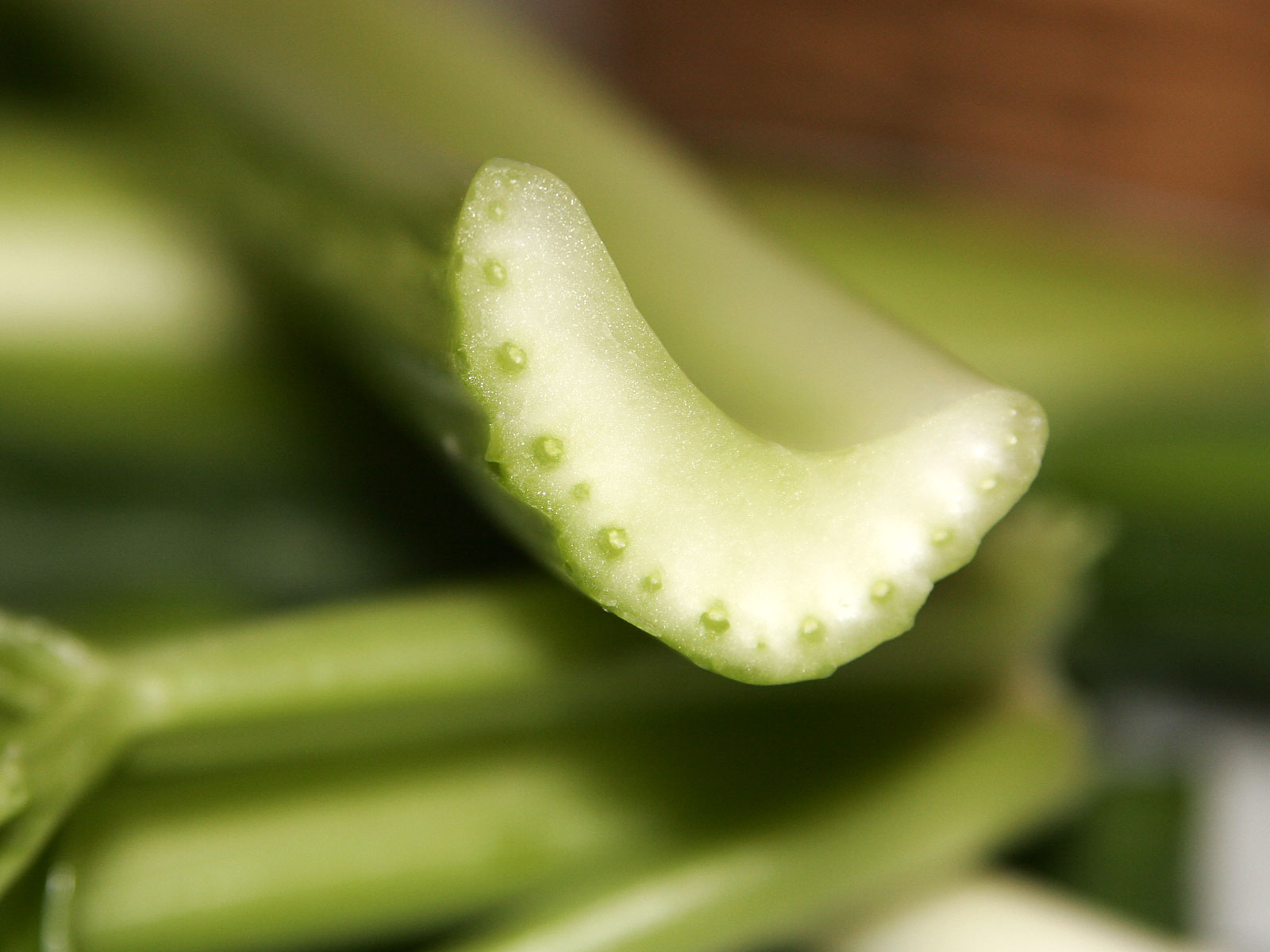
Cross section of celery stalk, showing vascular bundles, which include both phloem and xylem

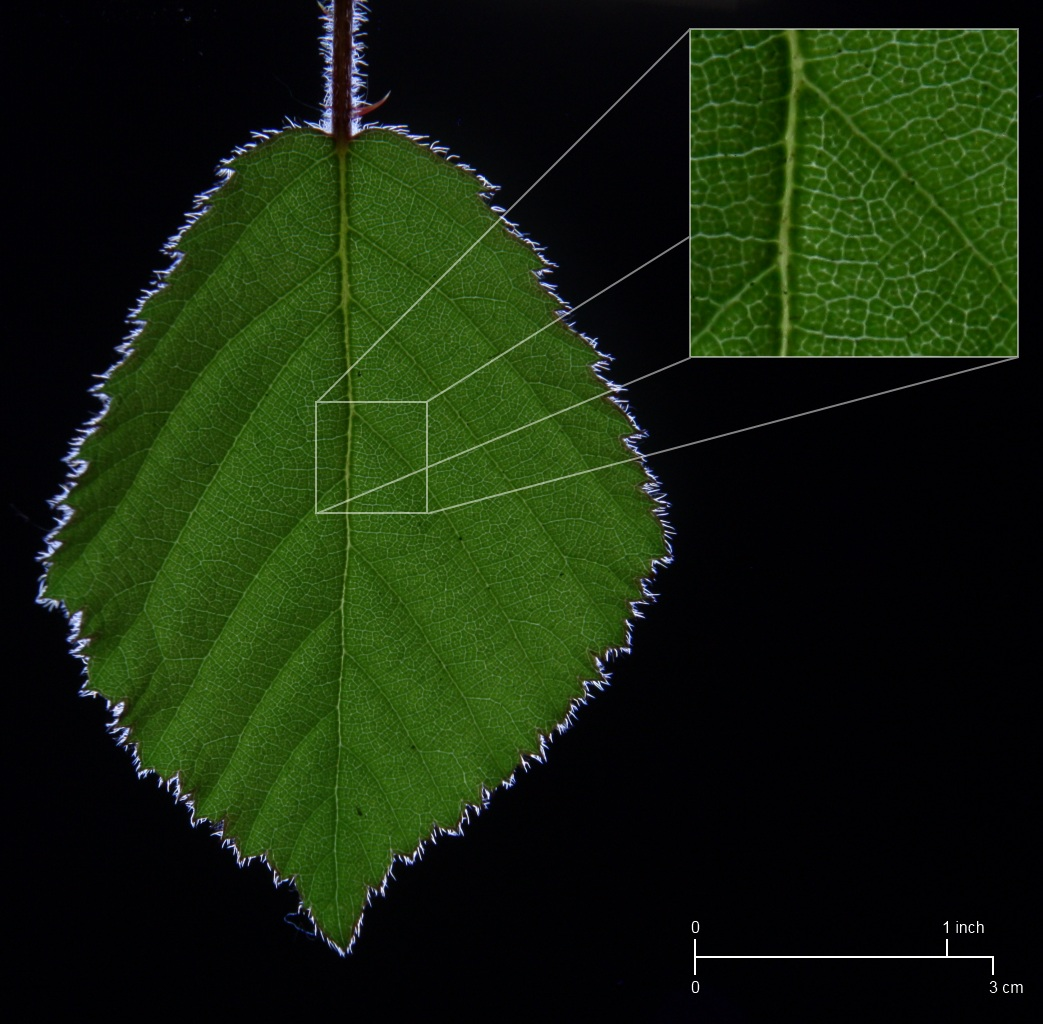
Detail of the vasculature of a bramble leaf

Translocation in vascular plants

Vascular tissue is a complex transporting tissue, formed of more than one cell type, found in vascular plants. The primary components of vascular tissue are the xylem and phloem. These two tissues transport fluid and nutrients internally. There are also two meristems associated with vascular tissue: the vascular cambium and the cork cambium. All the vascular tissues within a particular plant together constitute the vascular tissue system of that plant.

The cells in vascular tissue are typically long and slender. Since the xylem and phloem function in the conduction of water, minerals, and nutrients throughout the plant, it is not surprising that their form should be similar to pipes. The individual cells of phloem are connected end-to-end, just as the sections of a pipe might be. As the plant grows, new vascular tissue differentiates in the growing tips of the plant. The new tissue is aligned with existing vascular tissue, maintaining its connection throughout the plant. The vascular tissue in plants is arranged in long, discrete strands called vascular bundles. These bundles include both xylem and phloem, as well as supporting and protective cells. In stems and roots, the xylem typically lies closer to the interior of the stem with phloem towards the exterior of the stem. In the stems of some Asterales dicots, there may be phloem located inwardly from the xylem as well.

Between the xylem and phloem is a meristem called the vascular cambium. This tissue divides off cells that will become additional xylem and phloem. This growth increases the girth of the plant, rather than its length. As long as the vascular cambium continues to produce new cells, the plant will continue to grow more stout. In trees and other plants that develop wood, the vascular cambium allows the expansion of vascular tissue that produces woody growth. Because this growth ruptures the epidermis of the stem, woody plants also have a cork cambium that develops among the phloem. The cork cambium gives rise to thickened cork cells to protect the surface of the plant and reduce water loss. Both the production of wood and the production of cork are forms of secondary growth.

In leaves, the vascular bundles are located among the spongy mesophyll. The xylem is oriented toward the adaxial surface of the leaf (usually the upper side), and phloem is oriented toward the abaxial surface of the leaf. This is why aphids are typically found on the undersides of the leaves rather than on the top, since the phloem transports sugars manufactured by the plant and they are closer to the lower surface.

== See also ==
- Xylem
- Phloem
- Cork cambium
- Vascular cambium
- Vascular plant
- Stele (biology)
- Circulatory system
