= Symplast =

Interconnected intracellular space of a plant

The apoplastic and symplastic pathways

The symplast (from Greek sym "together" + plasma "formed or moulded substance") is the continuous, living network of cytoplasm that extends through most plant tissues. Its continuity is established by thousands of plasmodesmata — plasma-membrane-lined nanoscopic tunnels that pierce the cell walls and join the cytosol and endoplasmic reticulum of adjacent cells. Because those channels also open into the phloem sieve elements, the symplast provides both short-range and long-range conduits for water, nutrients, metabolites, proteins and RNAs to move between cells along concentration or pressure gradients. By contrast, the apoplast comprises the porous cell-wall matrix and extracellular spaces through which solutes diffuse outside the plasma membrane.

== Structure and continuity ==
Electron microscopy shows that a single plasmodesma consists of a narrow cylindrical sleeve of cytosol bounded by plasma membrane and traversed by a central rod of endoplasmic reticulum called the desmotubule. Cross-sections reveal protein "spokes”" connecting these membranes; the surrounding wall is enriched in pectins rather than cellulose, a composition thought to confer the flexibility needed for rapid aperture changes. Primary plasmodesmata form during cytokinesis when strands of endoplasmic reticulum become trapped in the cell plate, whereas secondary pores are inserted later into existing walls, often budding next to older channels to create pit fields. In highly specialised interfaces— for example between companion cells and sieve elements—plasmodesmata widen asymmetrically into pore plasmodesmata or sieve pores that sustain bulk phloem flow.

== Transport and regulation ==
Diffusion through plasmodesmata is gated by a reversible 'size-exclusion limit. Deposition of the β-1,3-glucan callose around the pore narrows or seals the cytoplasmic sleeve, while callose hydrolases reopen it. This dynamic control underpins developmental events such as dormancy release and floral induction, as well as stress responses triggered by wounding, low temperature, salicylic acid accumulation or pathogen attack. Small metabolites and ions traverse open pores within minutes; larger proteins (for example the maize transcription factor KN1) and mobile small RNAs can be trafficked by active, energy-dependent mechanisms that transiently unfold or chaperone the cargo. Certain plant viruses exploit the same pathway via movement proteins that loosen the size limit or by extruding protein tubules through the wall.

== Role in roots and long-distance transport ==
In roots, water and mineral ions absorbed by epidermal and cortical cells can move in two ways towards the stele. Apoplastic flow is halted at the Casparian strip, forcing ions to enter the symplast of the endodermis before they are released into pericycle cells and ultimately loaded into the xylem sap for upward transport. A parallel symplastic route links epidermis, cortex, endodermis and pericycle directly, driven by water-potential gradients; it is particularly important for phosphate and other nutrients that bind strongly to cell walls, and for the movement of signalling molecules that co-ordinate root architecture.

== History ==
Intercellular channels were first reported by Eduard Tangl in 1879, and the term plasmodesmata was coined by Eduard Strasburger in 1901. Johannes von Hanstein introduced the word symplast in 1880, and Ernst Münch contrasted apoplast and symplast in his 1930 monograph on phloem transport. Modern fluorescence microscopy and dye tracer studies during the late twentieth century proved cytoplasmic continuity at the whole-plant scale and revealed that plasmodesmata are actively regulated conduits rather than passive holes.

== See also ==
- Plant sap
- Polar auxin transport, a type of cell-to-cell transport
- Protoplast
- Tonoplast
