= Root =

Basal organ of a vascular plant

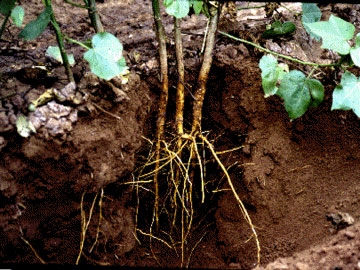
Primary and secondary roots in a cotton plant

In vascular plants, the roots are the organs of a plant that are modified to provide anchorage for the plant and take in water and nutrients into the plant body, which allows plants to grow taller and faster. They are most often below the surface of the soil, but roots can also be aerial or aerating, that is, growing up above the ground or especially above water.

== Function ==
Roots perform several essential and specialized roles that support plant growth, development and survival. Their primary functions are anchorage, uptake (absorption) of water and dissolved minerals, and conduction of these resources to the shoot. Beyond these, roots carry out a range of important secondary and adaptive functions — storage of reserves, synthesis of growth regulators, gas exchange in waterlogged environments, facilitation of symbiotic nutrient acquisition, and vegetative propagation.

=== Primary functions ===
Anchorage and mechanical support. Roots fix the plant in the substrate and resist mechanical forces (wind, waterflow); vigorous root systems are essential for crop stability and prevention of lodging.

Absorption of water and mineral nutrients. Root epidermal cells and root hairs take up soil water and dissolved ions; these are then conducted to the shoot via the xylem. Root architecture (depth, spread) determines access to water and nutrients in different soil horizons.

=== Secondary and specialised functions ===
Storage of reserve food and water. Many roots (fleshy taproots, tuberous roots) accumulate carbohydrates and water that support perennial growth or regrowth after dormancy. Examples include sweet potato and carrot.

Conduction. Roots conduct absorbed water, minerals and some synthesised compounds to the shoot via vascular tissues (xylem and phloem connections).

Synthesis of growth regulators. Roots synthesise and modulate plant hormones (e.g., cytokinins, some auxin metabolism), influencing shoot development and whole-plant physiology.

Aeration and gas exchange (in aquatic/waterlogged soils). Specialised structures (pneumatophores, aerial roots) permit gas exchange where soil oxygen is limited, enabling respiration in mangroves and other hydrophytes.

Symbiotic interactions and enhanced nutrient uptake. Roots form mutualisms (e.g., mycorrhizae, nitrogen-fixing nodules) that greatly increase nutrient acquisition and stress tolerance. These associations remodel root architecture and function.

Mechanical adaptations and additional support. Adventitious and brace/prop roots (e.g., maize, some mangroves, banyan) provide extra support, anchorage and stability in particular environments.

Vegetative propagation. Adventitious rooting on stems, nodes or cuttings allows many species to reproduce asexually and to regenerate after damage; this is widely exploited in horticulture.

=== Notes ===
Many functions overlap: a given root can simultaneously anchor, absorb, store reserves and engage in symbiosis. Root form and function are plastic and shaped by species genetics and environmental context (soil texture, water availability, aeration and mechanical stresses).

== Types of roots ==
Plants produce a variety of root systems that differ in origin, structure and function (anchorage, absorption, storage, aeration and vegetative propagation). The two classical, broad categories are taproot and fibrous systems, but several specialised root types — notably adventitious, aerial, prop/stilt, climbing/adhesive, buttress, tuberous (storage) and floating roots — are biologically and ecologically important.

=== Taproot system ===
A taproot system is dominated by a single, vertically growing primary root (the radicle) from which lateral roots arise. Taproots often function in deep anchorage and in storage of carbohydrates and water (common in many dicotyledons and some biennials/perennials). Examples include carrot (Daucus carota), dandelion (Taraxacum) and many true dicots.

=== Fibrous root system ===
A fibrous root system consists of numerous, similarly sized roots that form a dense network near the soil surface. In many species this network is composed largely of adventitious roots that arise from the stem base rather than the primary radicle. Fibrous systems are effective at soil binding, rapid uptake of surface nutrients and erosion control. Typical examples are grasses (Poaceae), wheat and rice.

=== Adventitious roots ===
Adventitious roots arise from non-root organs (stems, nodes, leaves or callus tissue) and play multiple roles: replacing or supplementing the primary root, providing mechanical support, enabling vegetative propagation, and forming specialized root types (aerial roots, prop roots, pneumatophores). They are especially important in monocots and many cultivated plants, and are a common response to wounding, flooding or other stressors.

Examples and notes: in many monocots the functional root system is adventitious (forming a fibrous habit); maize (Zea mays) produces nodal brace/prop roots that stabilise the stem; banyan (Ficus spp.) develops aerial adventitious roots that may become supportive trunks; many cuttings root adventitiously during vegetative propagation.

== Anatomy ==
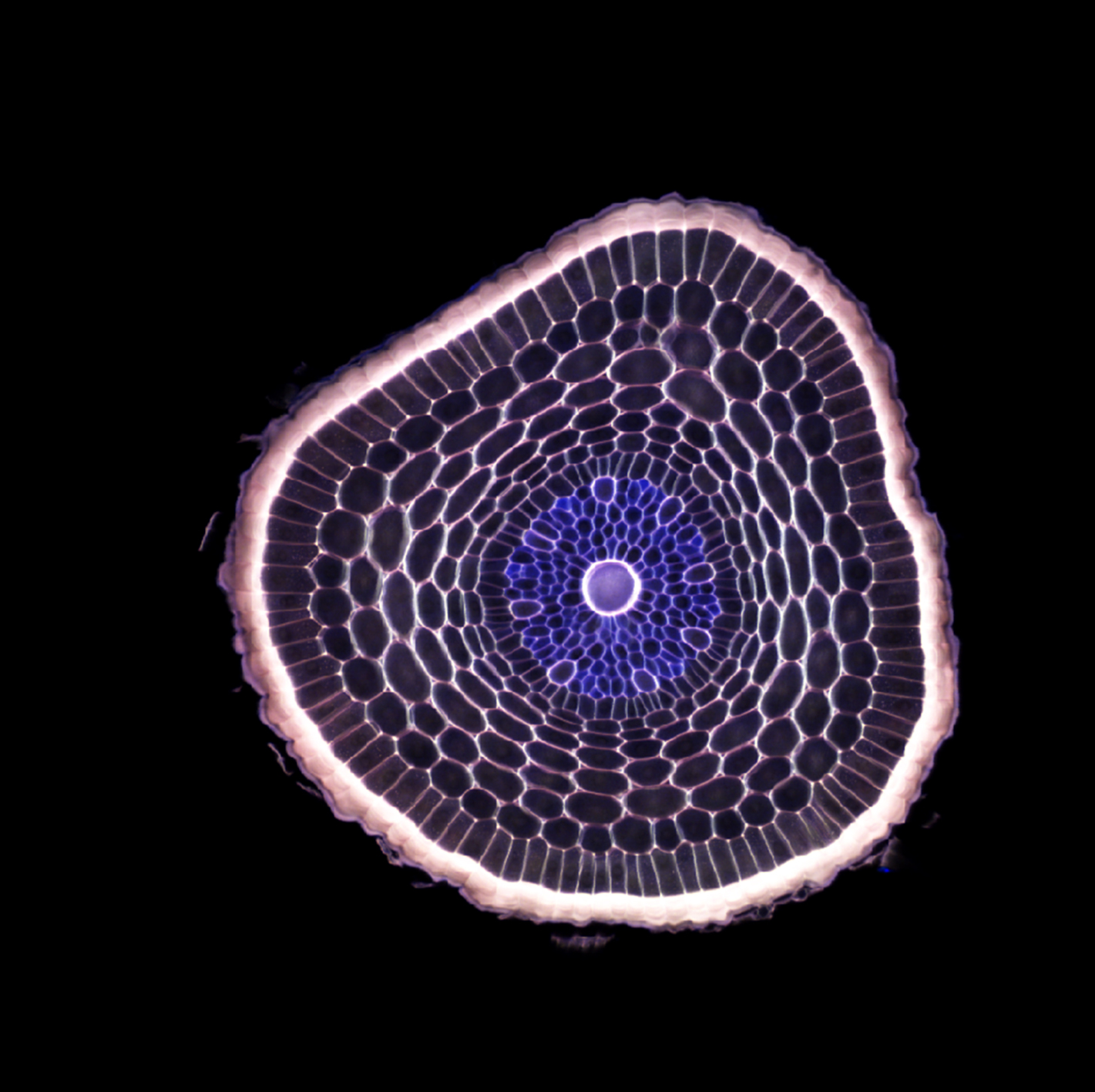
The cross-section of a barley root

Root morphology is divided into four zones: the root cap, the apical meristem, the elongation zone, and the hair. The root cap of new roots helps the root penetrate the soil. These root caps are sloughed off as the root goes deeper creating a slimy surface that provides lubrication. The apical meristem behind the root cap produces new root cells that elongate. Then, root hairs form that absorb water and mineral nutrients from the soil. The first root in seed producing plants is the radicle, which expands from the plant embryo after seed germination.

When dissected, the arrangement of the cells in a root is root hair, epidermis, epiblem, cortex, endodermis, pericycle and, lastly, the vascular tissue in the centre of a root to transport the water absorbed by the root to other places of the plant.

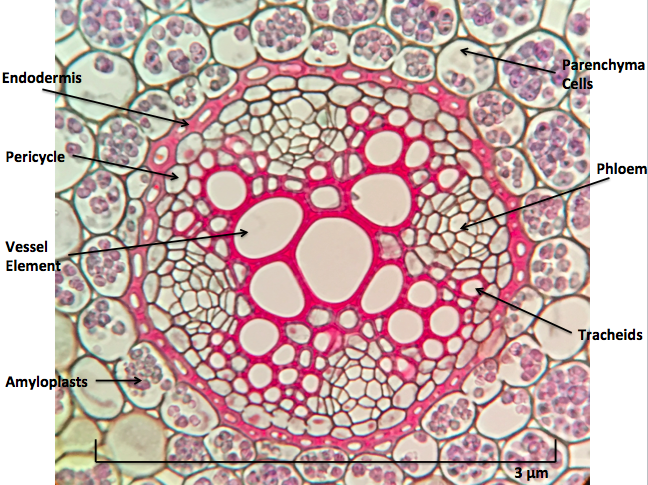
Ranunculus root cross section

Perhaps the most striking characteristic of roots that distinguishes them from other plant organs such as stem-branches and leaves is that roots have an endogenous origin, i.e., they originate and develop from an inner layer of the mother axis, such as pericycle. In contrast, stem-branches and leaves are exogenous, i.e., they start to develop from the cortex, an outer layer.

In response to the concentration of nutrients, roots also synthesize cytokinin, which acts as a signal as to how fast the shoots can grow. Roots often function in storage of food and nutrients. The roots of most vascular plant species enter into symbiosis with certain fungi to form mycorrhizae, and a large range of other organisms including bacteria also closely associate with roots.

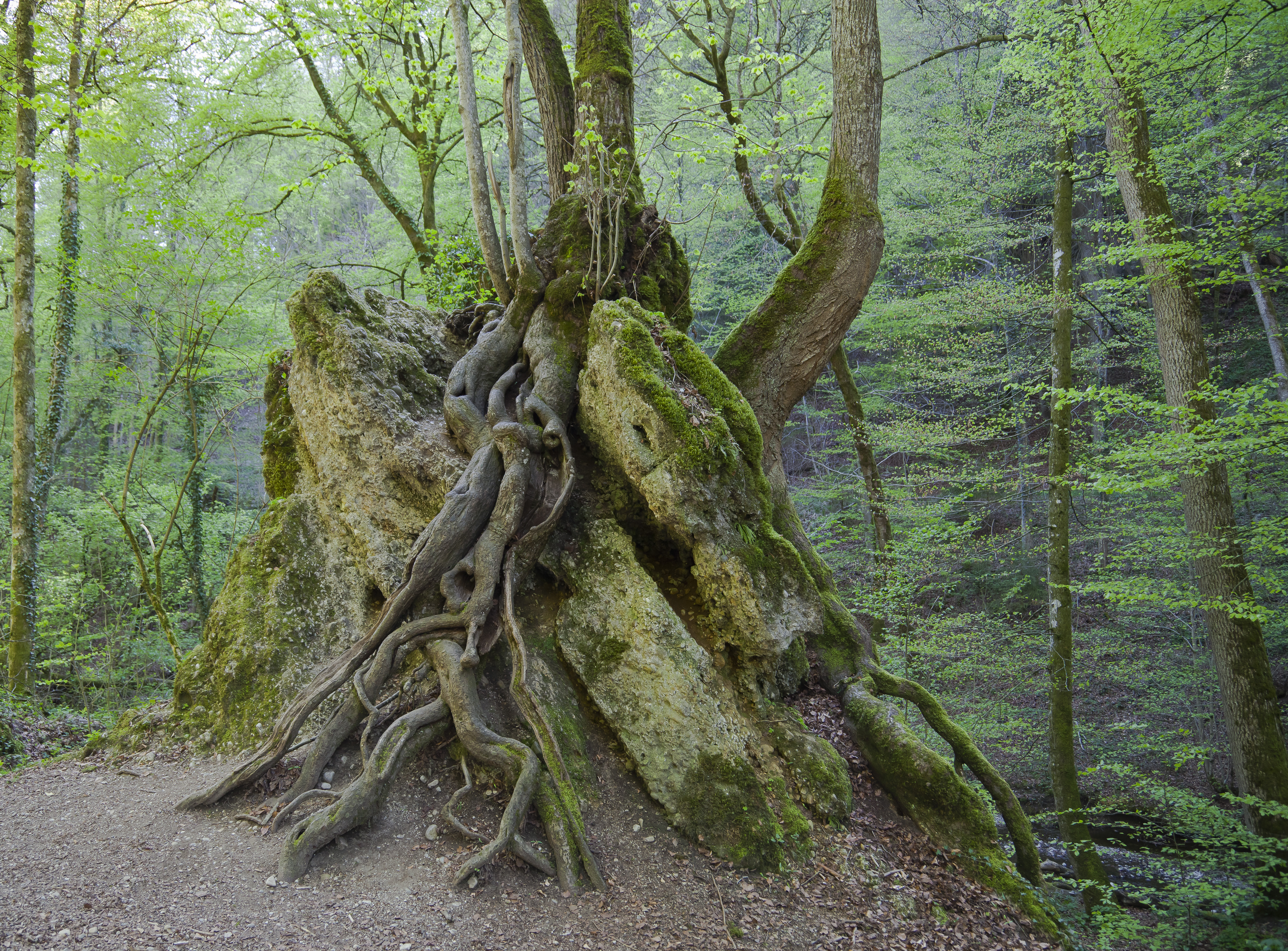
Large, mature tree roots above the soil

== Root system architecture ==
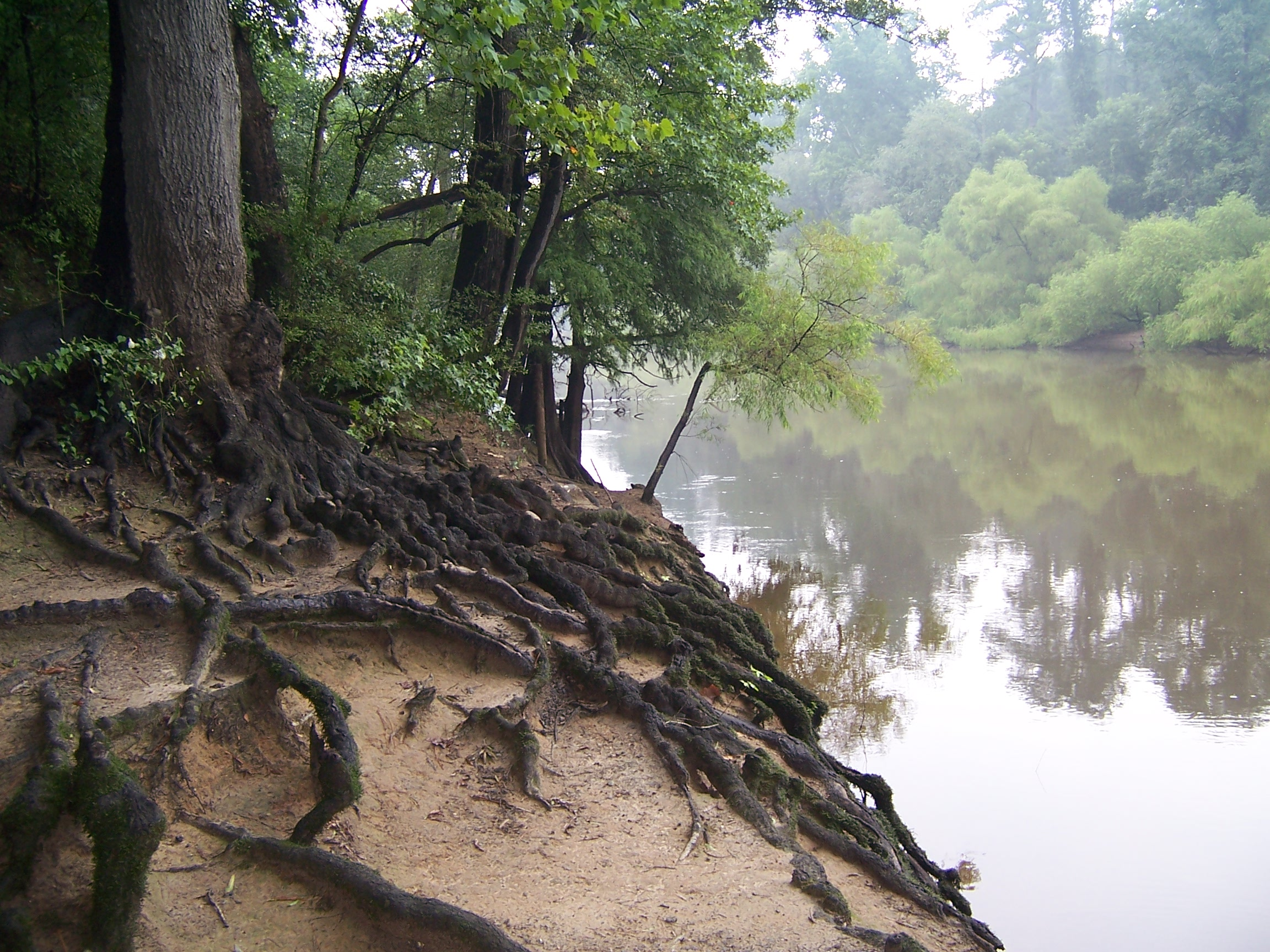
Tree roots at Cliffs of the Neuse State Park

=== Definition ===
In its simplest form, the term root system architecture (RSA) refers to the spatial configuration of a plant's root system. This system can be extremely complex and is dependent upon multiple factors such as the species of the plant itself, the composition of the soil and the availability of nutrients. Root architecture plays the important role of providing a secure supply of nutrients and water as well as anchorage and support.

The configuration of root systems serves to structurally support the plant and compete with other plants for uptake of nutrients within the soil. Roots grow in response to specific ecological conditions, which, if changed, can impede a plant's growth. For example, a root system that has developed in dry soil may not be as efficient in flooded soil, yet plants are able to adapt to other changes in the environment, such as seasonal changes.

=== Terms and components ===
The main terms used to classify the architecture of a root system are:

Branch magnitude	Number of links (exterior or interior)
Topology	Pattern of branching (Herringbone, Dichotomous, Radial)
Link length	Distance between branches
Root angle	Radial angle of a lateral root's base around the parent root's circumference, the angle of a lateral root from its parent root, and the angle an entire system spreads.
Link radius	Diameter of root

All components of the root architecture are regulated through a complex interaction between genetic responses and responses due to environmental stimuli. These developmental stimuli are categorized as intrinsic, the genetic and nutritional influences, or extrinsic, the environmental influences, and are interpreted by signal transduction pathways.

Extrinsic factors affecting root architecture include gravity, light exposure, water and oxygen, as well as the availability or lack of nitrogen, phosphorus, sulphur, aluminium and sodium chloride. The main hormones (intrinsic stimuli) and respective pathways responsible for root architecture development include:

Auxin	Lateral root formation, maintenance of apical dominance and adventitious root formation.
Cytokinins	Cytokinins regulate root apical meristem size and promote lateral root elongation.
Ethylene	Promotes crown root formation.
Gibberellins	Together with ethylene, they promote crown primordia growth and elongation. Together with auxin, they promote root elongation. Gibberellins also inhibit lateral root primordia initiation.

== Growth ==
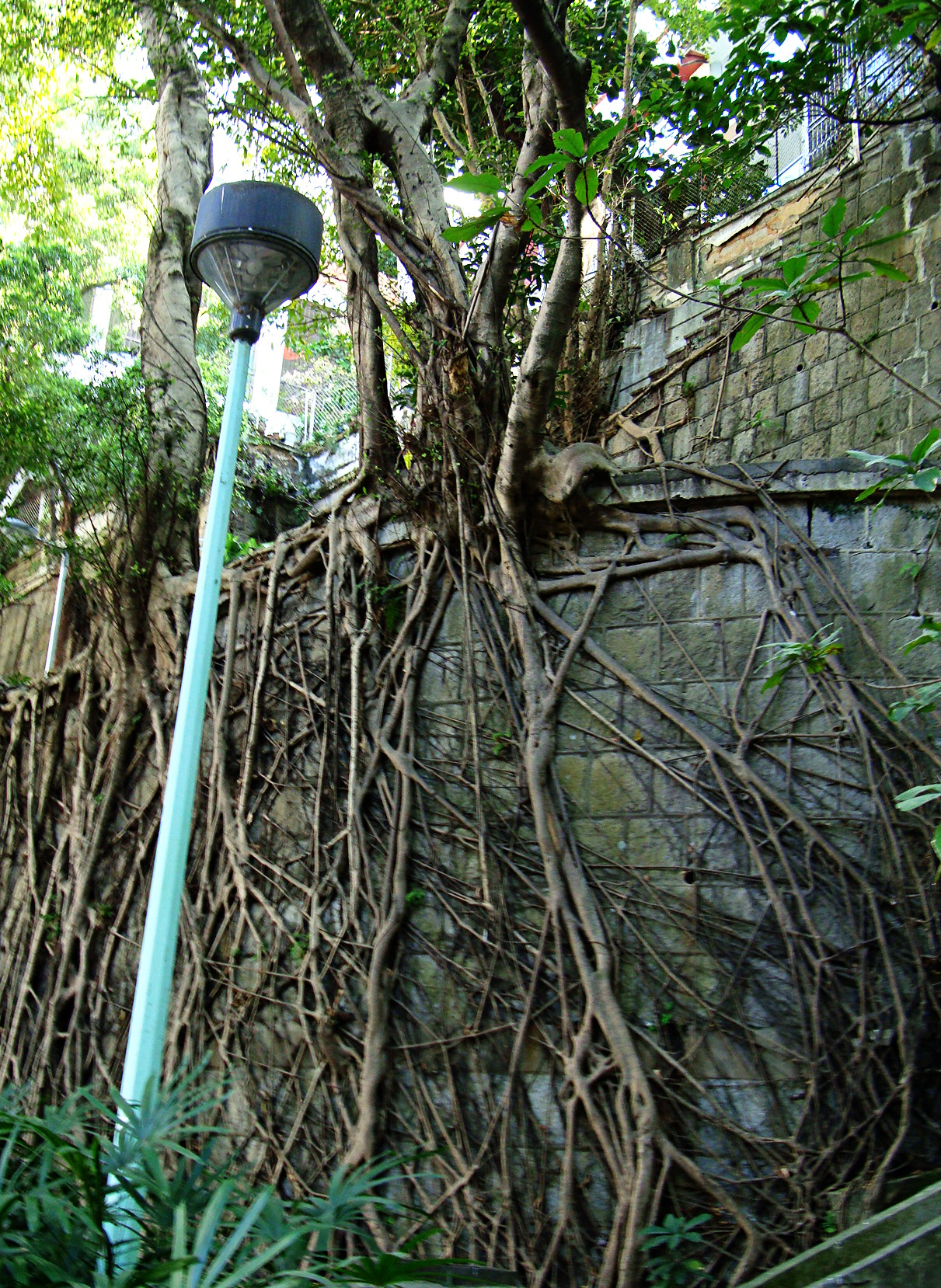
Roots of trees

Early root growth is one of the functions of the apical meristem located near the tip of the root. The meristem cells more or less continuously divide, producing more meristem, root cap cells (these are sacrificed to protect the meristem), and undifferentiated root cells. The latter become the primary tissues of the root, first undergoing elongation, a process that pushes the root tip forward in the growing medium. Gradually these cells differentiate and mature into specialized cells of the root tissues.

Growth from apical meristems is known as primary growth, which encompasses all elongation. Secondary growth encompasses all growth in diameter, a major component of woody plant tissues and many nonwoody plants. For example, storage roots of sweet potato have secondary growth but are not woody. Secondary growth occurs at the lateral meristems, namely the vascular cambium and cork cambium. The former forms secondary xylem and secondary phloem, while the latter forms the periderm.

In plants with secondary growth, the vascular cambium, originating between the xylem and the phloem, forms a cylinder of tissue along the stem and root. The vascular cambium forms new cells on both the inside and outside of the cambium cylinder, with those on the inside forming secondary xylem cells, and those on the outside forming secondary phloem cells. As secondary xylem accumulates, the "girth" (lateral dimensions) of the stem and root increases. As a result, tissues beyond the secondary phloem including the epidermis and cortex, in many cases tend to be pushed outward and are eventually "sloughed off" (shed).

At this point, the cork cambium begins to form the periderm, consisting of protective cork cells. The walls of cork cells contains suberin thickenings, which is an extra cellular complex biopolymer. The suberin thickenings functions by providing a physical barrier, protection against pathogens and by preventing water loss from the surrounding tissues. In addition, it also aids the process of wound healing in plants. It is also postulated that suberin could be a component of the apoplastic barrier (present at the outer cell layers of roots) which prevents toxic compounds from entering the root and reduces radial oxygen loss (ROL) from the aerenchyma during waterlogging. In roots, the cork cambium originates in the pericycle, a component of the vascular cylinder.

The vascular cambium produces new layers of secondary xylem annually. The xylem vessels are dead at maturity (in some) but are responsible for most water transport through the vascular tissue in stems and roots.

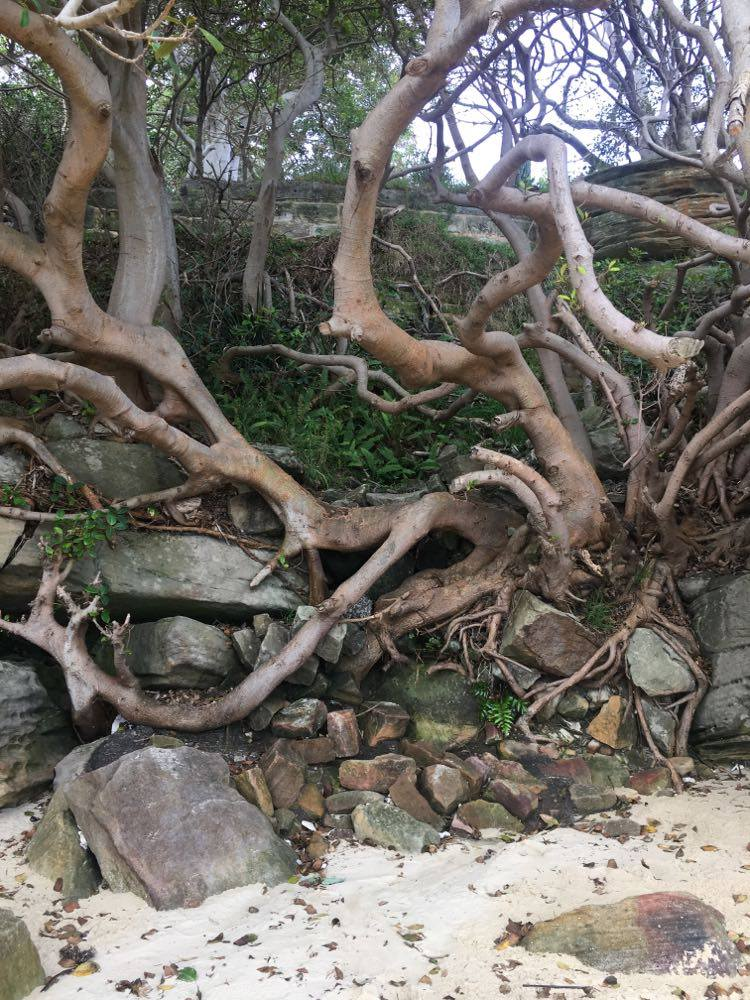
Tree roots at Port Jackson

Tree roots usually grow to three times the diameter of the branch spread, only half of which lie underneath the trunk and canopy. The roots from one side of a tree usually supply nutrients to the foliage on the same side. Some families however, such as Sapindaceae (the maple family), show no correlation between root location and where the root supplies nutrients on the plant.

=== Regulation ===
There is a correlation of roots using the process of plant perception to sense their physical environment to grow, including the sensing of light, and physical barriers. Plants also sense gravity and respond through auxin pathways, resulting in gravitropism. Over time, roots can crack foundations, snap water lines, and lift sidewalks. Research has shown that roots have ability to recognize 'self' and 'non-self' roots in same soil environment.

The correct environment of air, mineral nutrients and water directs plant roots to grow in any direction to meet the plant's needs. Roots will shy or shrink away from dry or other poor soil conditions.

Gravitropism directs roots to grow downward at germination, the growth mechanism of plants that also causes the shoot to grow upward. Different types of roots such as primary, seminal, lateral and crown are maintained at different gravitropic setpoint angles i.e. the direction in which they grow. Recent research show that root angle in cereal crops such as barley and wheat is regulated by a novel gene called Enhanced Gravitropism 1 (EGT1).

Research indicates that plant roots growing in search of productive nutrition can sense and avoid soil compaction through diffusion of the gas ethylene.

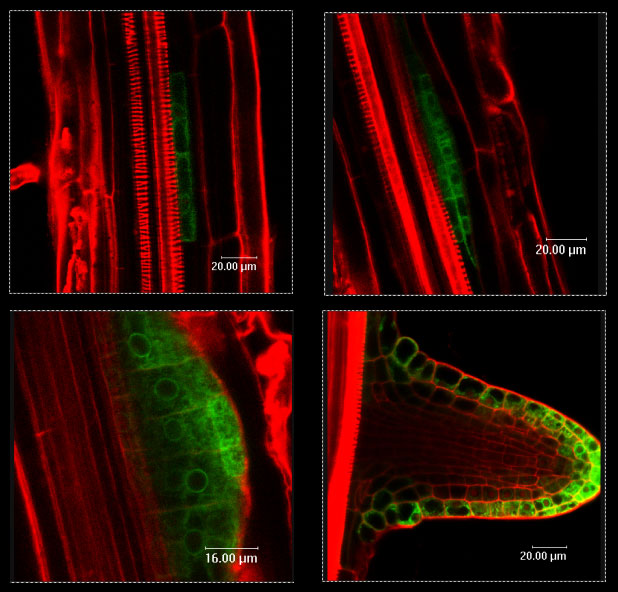
Fluorescent imaging of an emerging lateral root

== Shade avoidance response ==
In order to avoid shade, plants utilize a shade avoidance response. When a plant is under dense vegetation, the presence of other vegetation nearby will cause the plant to avoid lateral growth and experience an increase in upward shoot, as well as downward root growth. In order to escape shade, plants adjust their root architecture, most notably by decreasing the length and amount of lateral roots emerging from the primary root. Experimentation of mutant variants of Arabidopsis thaliana found that plants sense the Red to Far Red light ratio that enters the plant through photoreceptors known as phytochromes. Nearby plant leaves will absorb red light and reflect far-red light, which will cause the ratio red to far red light to lower. The phytochrome PhyA that senses this Red to Far Red light ratio is localized in both the root system as well as the shoot system of plants, but through knockout mutant experimentation, it was found that root localized PhyA does not sense the light ratio, whether directly or axially, that leads to changes in the lateral root architecture. Research instead found that shoot localized PhyA is the phytochrome responsible for causing these architectural changes of the lateral root. Research has also found that phytochrome completes these architectural changes through the manipulation of auxin distribution in the root of the plant. When a low enough Red to Far Red ratio is sensed by PhyA, the phyA in the shoot will be mostly in its active form. In this form, PhyA stabilize the transcription factor HY5 causing it to no longer be degraded as it is when phyA is in its inactive form. This stabilized transcription factor is then able to be transported to the roots of the plant through the phloem, where it proceeds to induce its own transcription as a way to amplify its signal. In the roots of the plant HY5 functions to inhibit an auxin response factor known as ARF19, a response factor responsible for the translation of PIN3 and LAX3, two well known auxin transporting proteins. Thus, through manipulation of ARF19, the level and activity of auxin transporters PIN3 and LAX3 is inhibited. Once inhibited, auxin levels will be low in areas where lateral root emergence normally occurs, resulting in a failure for the plant to have the emergence of the lateral root primordium through the root pericycle. With this complex manipulation of Auxin transport in the roots, lateral root emergence will be inhibited in the roots and the root will instead elongate downwards, promoting vertical plant growth in an attempt to avoid shade.

Research of Arabidopsis has led to the discovery of how this auxin mediated root response works. In an attempt to discover the role that phytochrome plays in lateral root development, Salisbury et al. (2007) worked with Arabidopsis thaliana grown on agar plates. Salisbury et al. used wild type plants along with varying protein knockout and gene knockout Arabidopsis mutants to observe the results these mutations had on the root architecture, protein presence, and gene expression. To do this, Salisbury et al. used GFP fluorescence along with other forms of both macro and microscopic imagery to observe any changes various mutations caused. From these research, Salisbury et al. were able to theorize that shoot located phytochromes alter auxin levels in roots, controlling lateral root development and overall root architecture. In the experiments of van Gelderen et al. (2018), they wanted to see if and how it is that the shoot of A. thaliana alters and affects root development and root architecture. To do this, they took Arabidopsis plants, grew them in agar gel, and exposed the roots and shoots to separate sources of light. From here, they altered the different wavelengths of light the shoot and root of the plants were receiving and recorded the lateral root density, amount of lateral roots, and the general architecture of the lateral roots. To identify the function of specific photoreceptors, proteins, genes, and hormones, they utilized various Arabidopsis knockout mutants and observed the resulting changes in lateral roots architecture. Through their observations and various experiments, van Gelderen et al. were able to develop a mechanism for how root detection of Red to Far-red light ratios alter lateral root development.

== Types ==
A true root system consists of a primary root and secondary roots (or lateral roots).

- the diffuse root system: the primary root is not dominant; the whole root system is fibrous and branches in all directions. Most common in monocots. The main function of the fibrous root is to anchor the plant.

=== Specialized ===
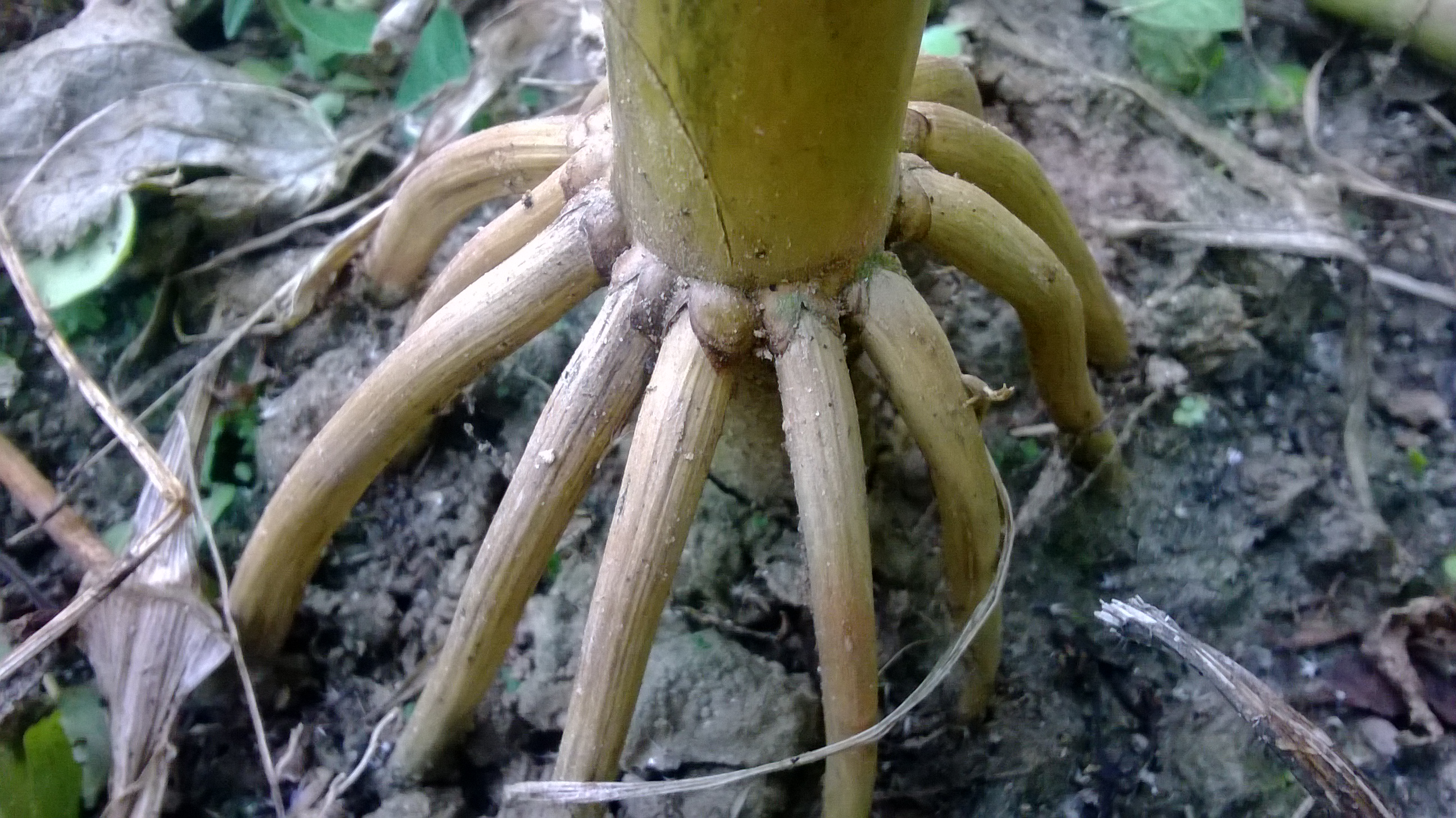
Stilt roots of maize plant

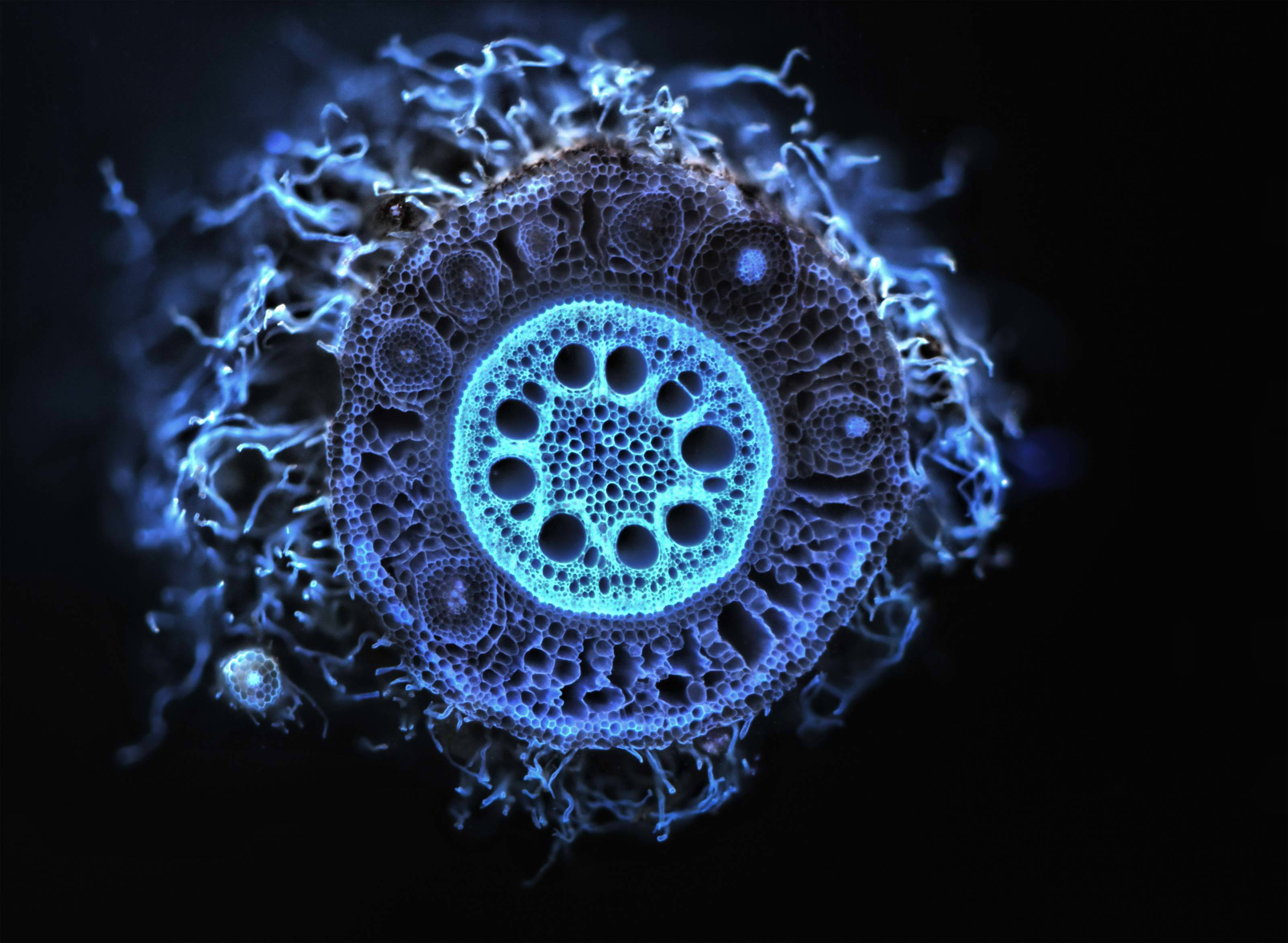
Cross section of an adventitous crown root of pearl millet (Pennisetum glaucum)

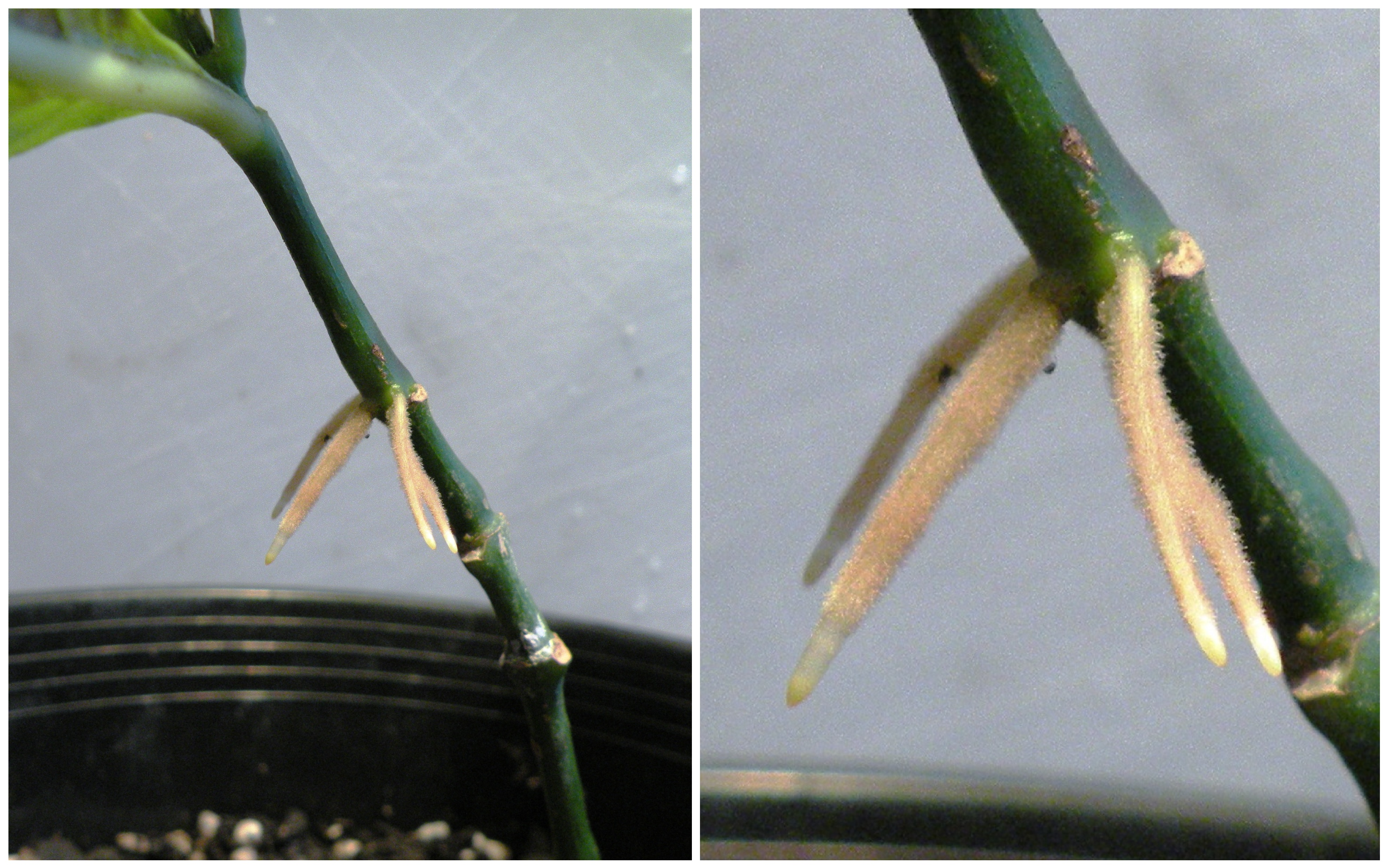
Roots forming above ground on a cutting of an Odontonema ("Firespike")

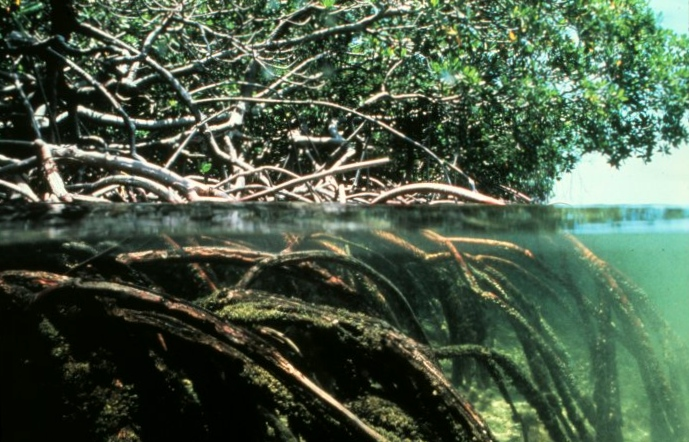
Aerating roots of a mangrove

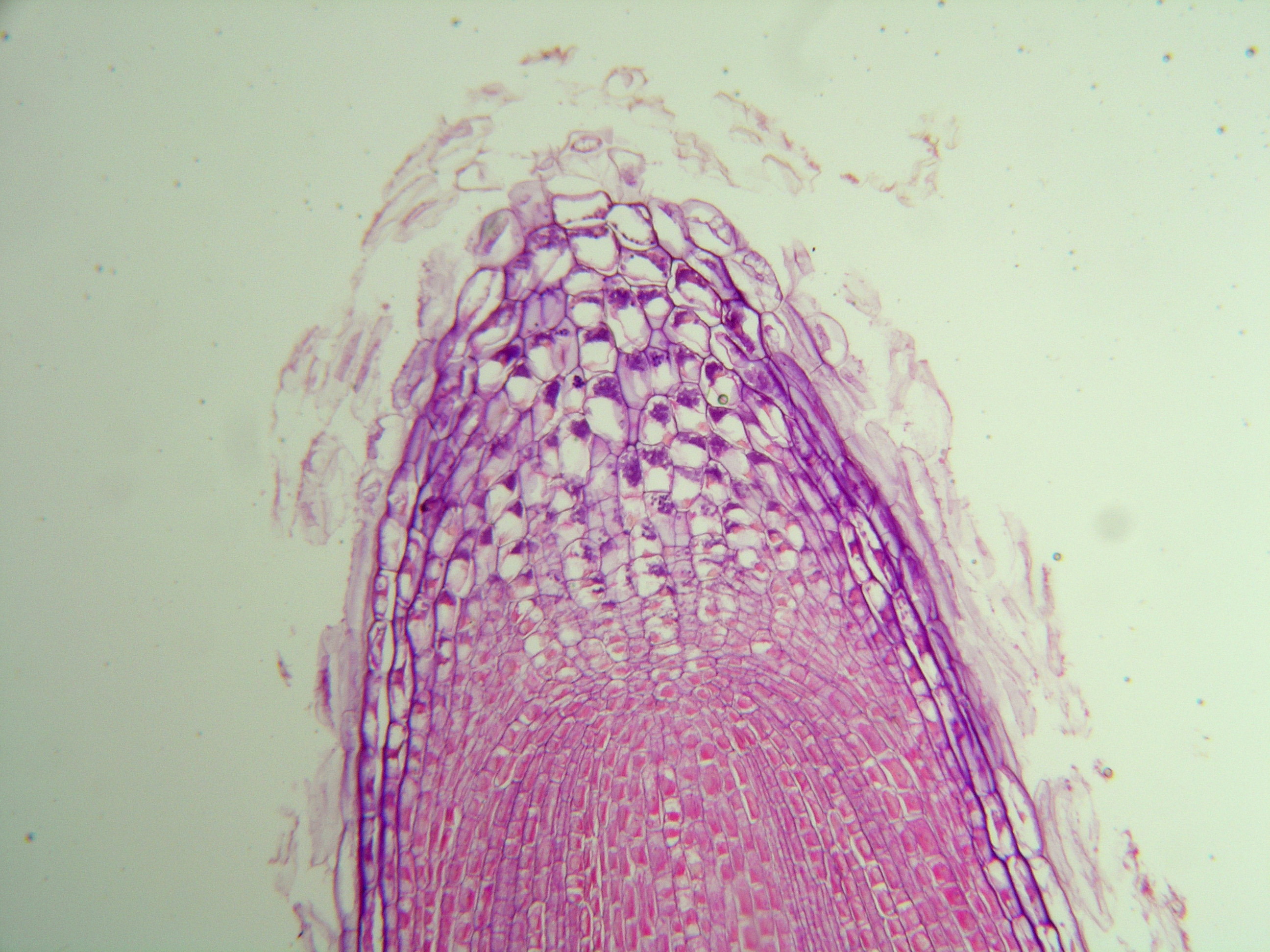
The growing tip of a fine root

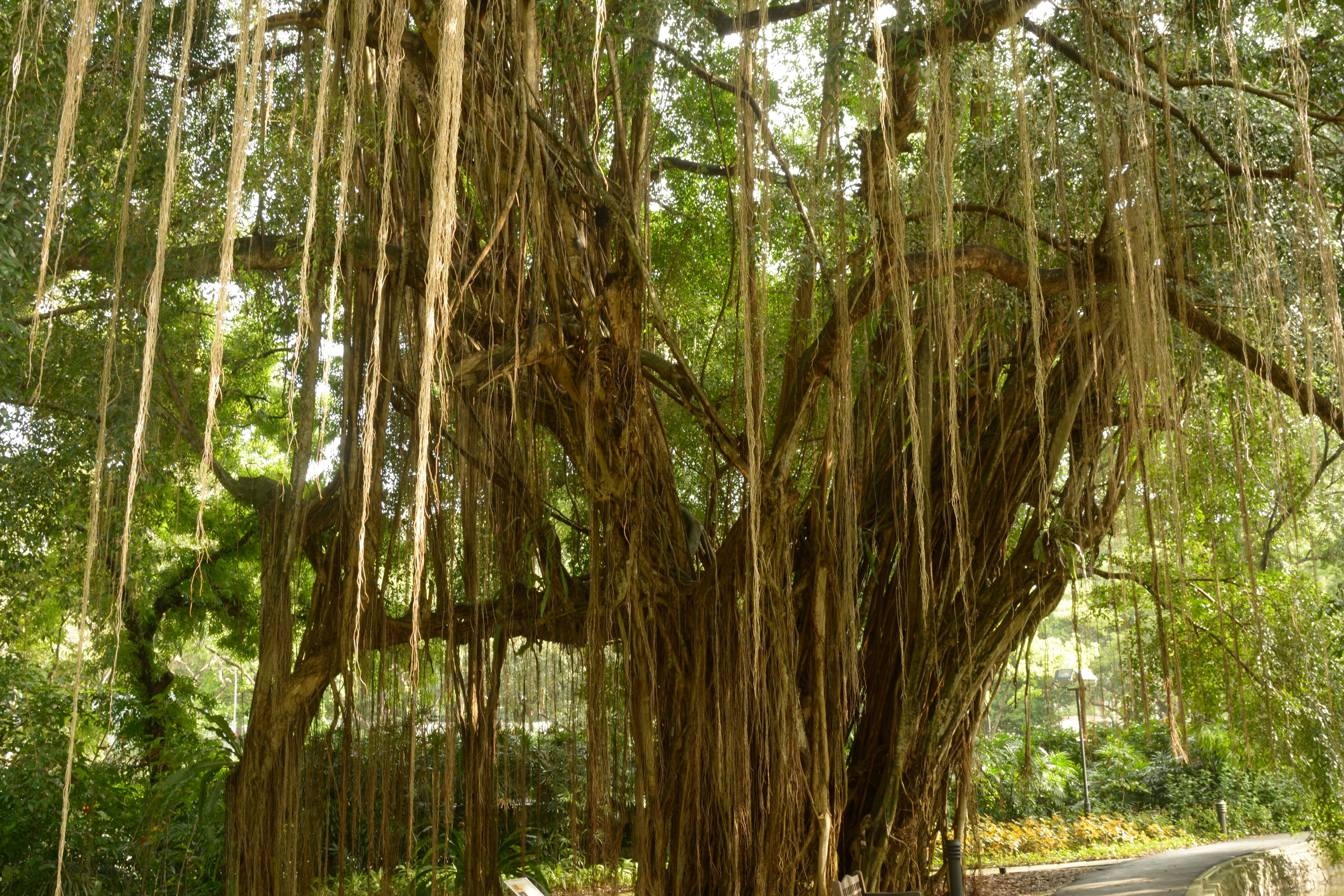
Aerial root

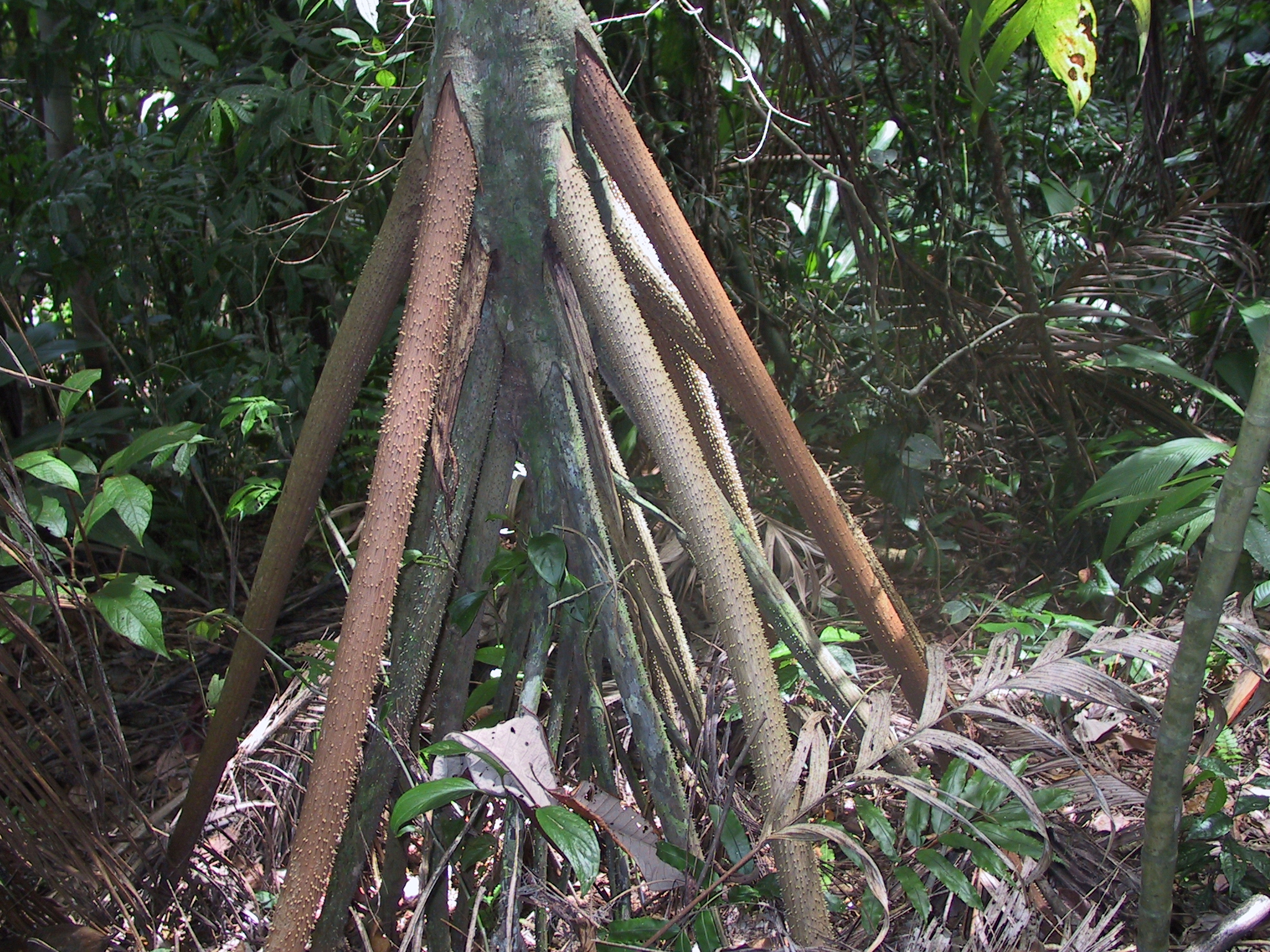
The stilt roots of Socratea exorrhiza

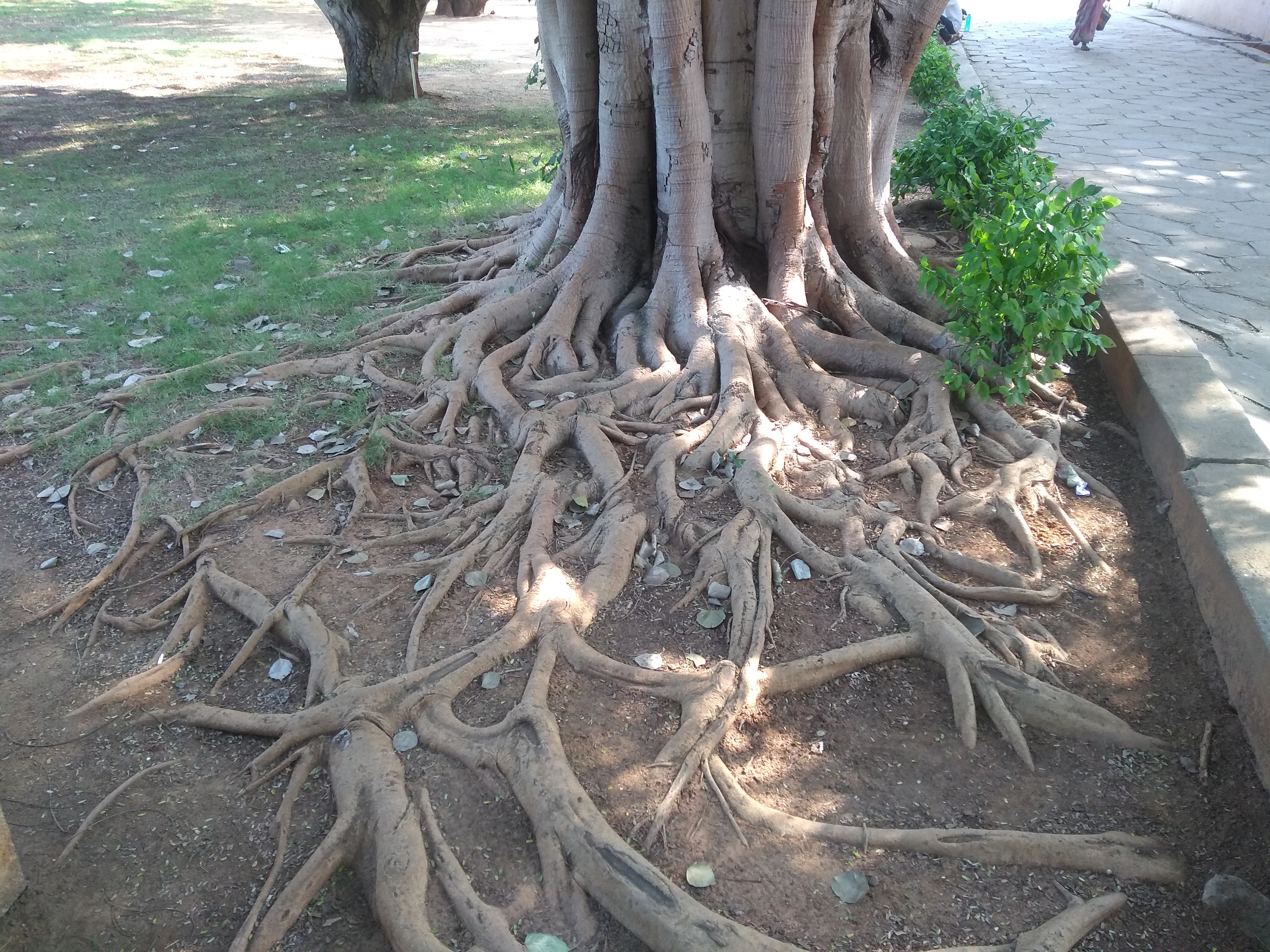
Visible roots

The roots, or parts of roots, of many plant species have become specialized to serve adaptive purposes besides the two primary functions, described in the introduction.

- Adventitious roots arise out-of-sequence from the more usual root formation of branches of a primary root, and instead originate from the stem, branches, leaves, or old woody roots. They commonly occur in monocots and pteridophytes, but also in many dicots, such as clover (Trifolium), ivy (Hedera), strawberry (Fragaria) and willow (Salix). Most aerial roots and stilt roots are adventitious. In some conifers adventitious roots can form the largest part of the root system. Adventitious root formation is enhanced in many plant species during (partial) submergence, to increase gas exchange and storage of gases like oxygen. Distinct types of adventitious roots can be classified and are dependent on morphology, growth dynamics and function.
- Aerating roots (or knee root or knee or pneumatophores): roots rising above the ground, especially above water such as in some mangrove genera (Avicennia, Sonneratia). In some plants like Avicennia the erect roots have a large number of breathing pores for exchange of gases.
- Aerial roots: roots entirely above the ground, such as in ivy (Hedera) or in epiphytic orchids. Many aerial roots are used to receive water and nutrient intake directly from the air – from fogs, dew or humidity in the air. Some rely on leaf systems to gather rain or humidity and even store it in scales or pockets. Other aerial roots, such as mangrove aerial roots, are used for aeration and not for water absorption. Other aerial roots are used mainly for structure, functioning as prop roots, as in maize or anchor roots or as the trunk in strangler fig. In some Epiphytes – plants living above the surface on other plants, aerial roots serve for reaching to water sources or reaching the surface, and then functioning as regular surface roots.
- Canopy roots/arboreal roots: roots that form when tree branches support mats of epiphytes and detritus, which hold water and nutrients in the canopy. They grow out into these mats, likely to utilize the available nutrients and moisture.
- Coarse roots: roots that have undergone secondary thickening and have a woody structure. These roots have some ability to absorb water and nutrients, but their main function is transport and to provide a structure to connect the smaller diameter, fine roots to the rest of the plant.
- Contractile roots: roots that pull bulbs or corms of monocots, such as hyacinth and lily, and some taproots, such as dandelion, deeper in the soil through expanding radially and contracting longitudinally. They have a wrinkled surface.
- Coralloid roots: similar to root nodules, these provide nitrogen to the plant. They are often larger than nodules, branched, and located at or near the soil surface, and harbor nitrogen-fixing cyanobacteria. They are only found in cycads.
- Dimorphic root systems: roots with two distinctive forms for two separate functions
- Fine roots: typically primary roots <2 mm diameter that have the function of water and nutrient uptake. They are often heavily branched and support mycorrhizas. These roots may be short lived, but are replaced by the plant in an ongoing process of root 'turnover'.
- Haustorial roots: roots of parasitic plants that can absorb water and nutrients from another plant, such as in mistletoe (Viscum album) and dodder.
- Propagative roots: roots that form adventitious buds that develop into aboveground shoots, termed suckers, which form new plants, as in common milkweed (Asclepias syriaca), Canada thistle (Cirsium arvense), and many others.
- Photosynthetic roots: roots that are green and photosynthesize, providing sugar to the plant. They are similar to phylloclades. Several orchids have these, such as Dendrophylax and Taeniophyllum.
- Proteoid roots or cluster roots: dense clusters of rootlets of limited growth that develop under low phosphate or low iron conditions in Proteaceae and some plants from the following families Betulaceae, Casuarinaceae, Elaeagnaceae, Moraceae, Fabaceae and Myricaceae.
- Root nodules: roots that harbor nitrogen-fixing soil bacteria. These are often very short and rounded. Root nodules are found in virtually all legumes.
- Stilt roots: adventitious support roots, common among mangroves. They grow down from lateral branches, branching in the soil.
- Storage roots: roots modified for storage of food or water, such as carrots and beets. They include some taproots and tuberous roots.
- Structural roots: large roots that have undergone considerable secondary thickening and provide mechanical support to woody plants and trees.
- Surface roots: roots that proliferate close below the soil surface, exploiting water and easily available nutrients. Where conditions are close to optimum in the surface layers of soil, the growth of surface roots is encouraged and they commonly become the dominant roots.
- Tuberous roots: fleshy and enlarged lateral roots for food or water storage, e.g. sweet potato. A type of storage root distinct from taproot.

== Depths ==
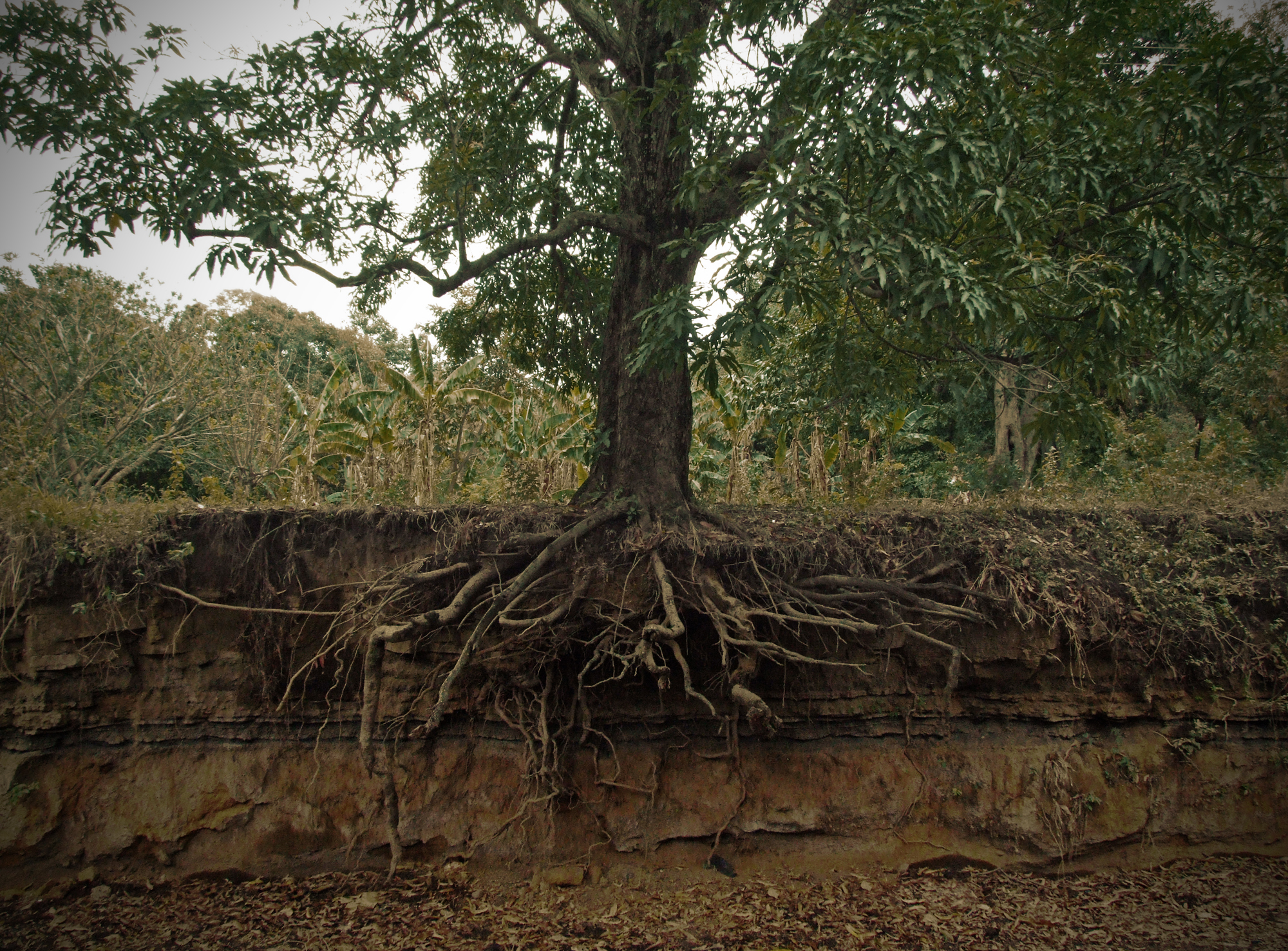
Cross section of a mango tree

The distribution of vascular plant roots within soil depends on plant form, the spatial and temporal availability of water and nutrients, and the physical properties of the soil. The deepest roots are generally found in deserts and temperate coniferous forests; the shallowest in tundra, boreal forest and temperate grasslands. The deepest observed living root, at least 60 metres (200 ft) below the ground surface, was observed during the excavation of an open-pit mine in Arizona, US. Some roots can grow as deep as the tree is high. The majority of roots on most plants are however found relatively close to the surface where nutrient availability and aeration are more favourable for growth. Rooting depth may be physically restricted by rock or compacted soil close below the surface, or by anaerobic soil conditions.

=== Records ===
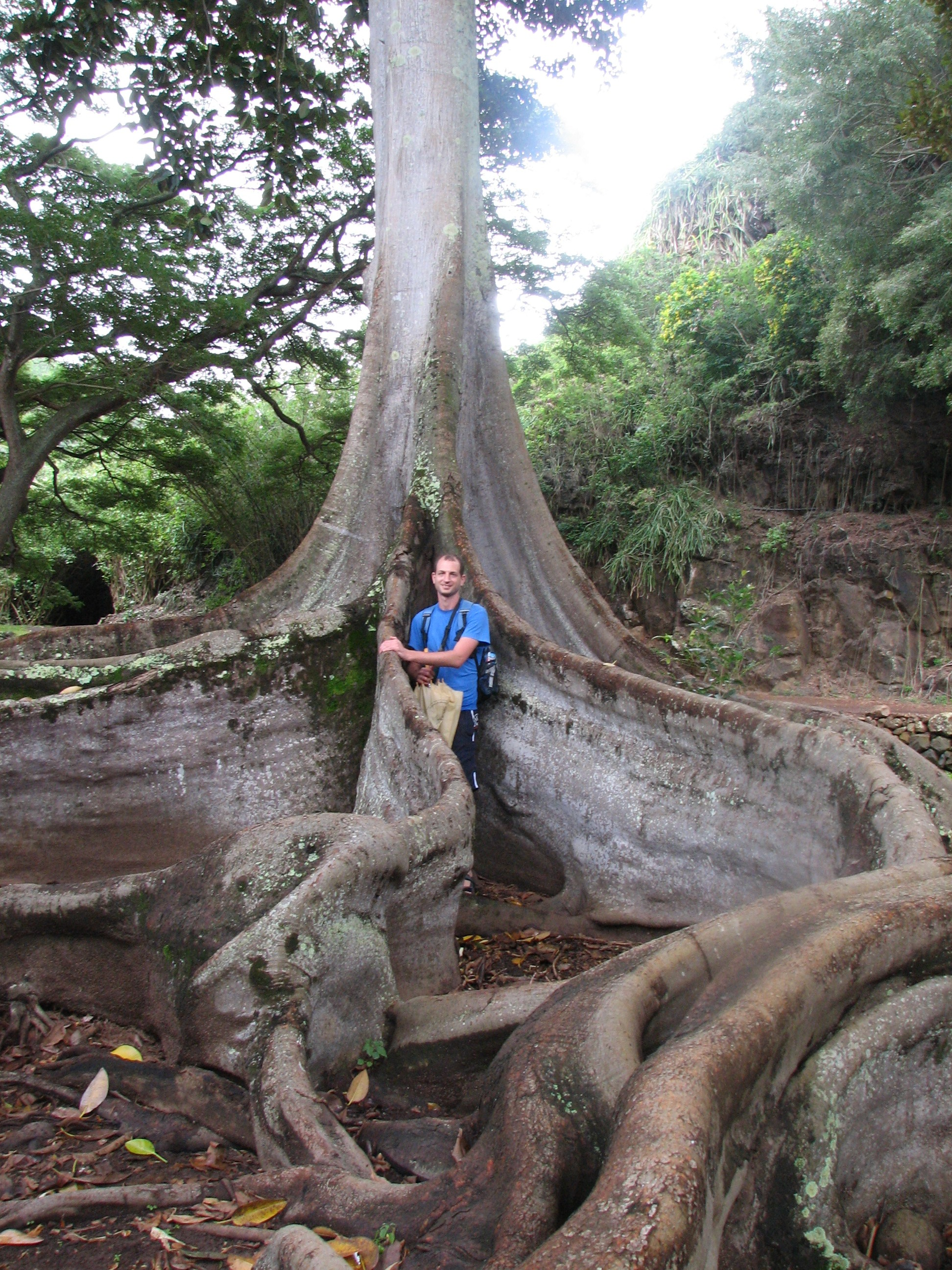
Ficus tree with buttress roots

Species	Location	Maximum rooting depth (m)	References
Boscia albitrunca	Kalahari desert	68	Jennings (1974)
Juniperus monosperma	Colorado Plateau	61	Cannon (1960)
Eucalyptus sp.	Australian forest	61	Jennings (1971)
Acacia erioloba	Kalahari desert	60	Jennings (1974)
Prosopis juliflora	Arizona desert	53.3	Phillips (1963)

== Evolutionary history ==
The fossil record of roots—or rather, infilled voids where roots rotted after death—spans back to the late Silurian, about 430 million years ago. Their identification is difficult, because casts and molds of roots are so similar in appearance to animal burrows. They can be discriminated using a range of features. The evolutionary development of roots likely happened from the modification of shallow rhizomes (modified horizontal stems) which anchored primitive vascular plants combined with the development of filamentous outgrowths (called rhizoids) which anchored the plants and conducted water to the plant from the soil.

== Environmental interactions ==
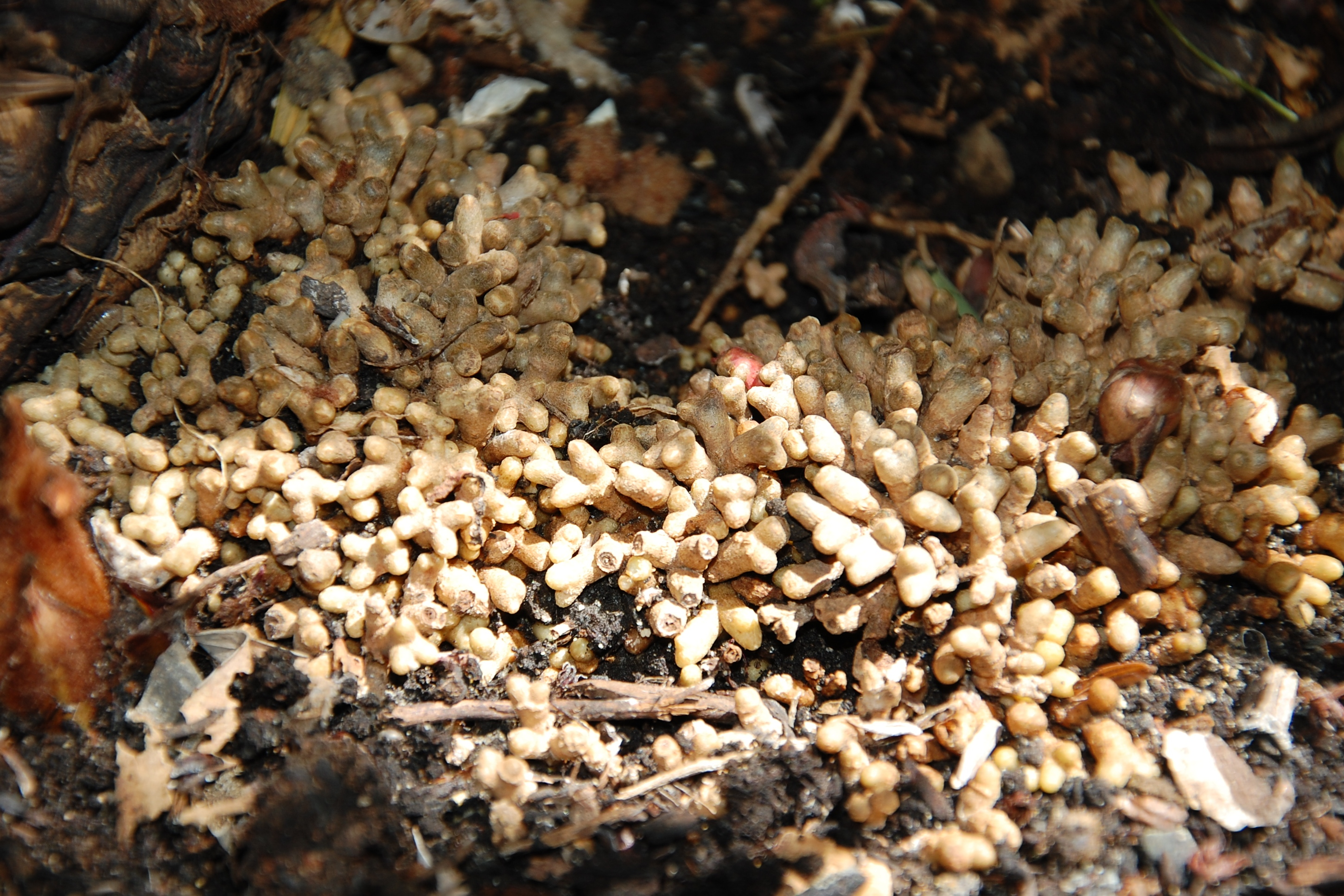
Coralloid roots of Cycas revoluta

Light has been shown to have some impact on roots, but it's not been studied as much as the effect of light on other plant systems. Early research in the 1930s found that light decreased the effectiveness of Indole-3-acetic acid on adventitious root initiation. Studies of the pea in the 1950s shows that lateral root formation was inhibited by light, and in the early 1960s researchers found that light could induce positive gravitropic responses in some situations. The effects of light on root elongation has been studied for monocotyledonous and dicotyledonous plants, with the majority of studies finding that light inhibited root elongation, whether pulsed or continuous. Studies of Arabidopsis in the 1990s showed negative phototropism and inhibition of the elongation of root hairs in light sensed by phyB.

Certain plants, namely Fabaceae, form root nodules in order to associate and form a symbiotic relationship with nitrogen-fixing bacteria called rhizobia. Owing to the high energy required to fix nitrogen from the atmosphere, the bacteria take carbon compounds from the plant to fuel the process. In return, the plant takes nitrogen compounds produced from ammonia by the bacteria.

Soil temperature is a factor that effects root initiation and length. Root length is usually impacted more dramatically by temperature than overall mass, where cooler temperatures tend to cause more lateral growth because downward extension is limited by cooler temperatures at subsoil levels. Needs vary by plant species, but in temperate regions cool temperatures may limit root systems. Cool temperature species like oats, rapeseed, rye, wheat fare better in lower temperatures than summer annuals like maize and cotton. Researchers have found that plants like cotton develop wider and shorter taproots in cooler temperatures. The first root originating from the seed usually has a wider diameter than root branches, so smaller root diameters are expected if temperatures increase root initiation. Root diameter also decreases when the root elongates.

The roots of some plants grow toward vibrations caused by flowing water, an ability known as phonotropism.

== Plant interactions ==
Plants can interact with one another in their environment through their root systems. Studies have demonstrated that plant-plant interaction occurs among root systems via the soil as a medium. Researchers have tested whether plants growing in ambient conditions would change their behavior if a nearby plant was exposed to drought conditions. Since nearby plants showed no changes in stomatal aperture researchers believe the drought signal spread through the roots and soil, not through the air as a volatile chemical signal.

== Soil interactions ==
Soil microbiota can suppress both disease and beneficial root symbionts (mycorrhizal fungi are easier to establish in sterile soil). Inoculation with soil bacteria can increase internode extension, yield and quicken flowering. The migration of bacteria along the root varies with natural soil conditions. For example, research has found that the root systems of wheat seeds inoculated with Azotobacter showed higher populations in soils favorable to Azotobacter growth. Some studies have been unsuccessful in increasing the levels of certain microbes (such as P. fluorescens) in natural soil without prior sterilization.

Grass root systems are beneficial at reducing soil erosion by holding the soil together. Perennial grasses that grow wild in rangelands contribute organic matter to the soil when their old roots decay after attacks by beneficial fungi, protozoa, bacteria, insects and worms release nutrients.

Scientists have observed significant diversity of the microbial cover of roots at around 10 percent of three week old root segments covered. On younger roots there was even low coverage, but even on 3-month-old roots the coverage was only around 37%. Before the 1970s, scientists believed that the majority of the root surface was covered by microorganisms.

== Nutrient absorption ==
Researchers studying maize seedlings found that calcium absorption was greatest in the apical root segment, and potassium at the base of the root. Along other root segments absorption was similar. Absorbed potassium is transported to the root tip, and to a lesser extent other parts of the root, then also to the shoot and grain. Calcium transport from the apical segment is slower, mostly transported upward and accumulated in stem and shoot.

Researchers found that partial deficiencies of K or P did not change the fatty acid composition of phosphatidyl choline in Brassica napus L. plants. Calcium deficiency did, on the other hand, lead to a marked decline of polyunsaturated compounds that would be expected to have negative impacts for integrity of the plant membrane, that could effect some properties like its permeability, and is needed for the ion uptake activity of the root membranes.

== Economic importance ==
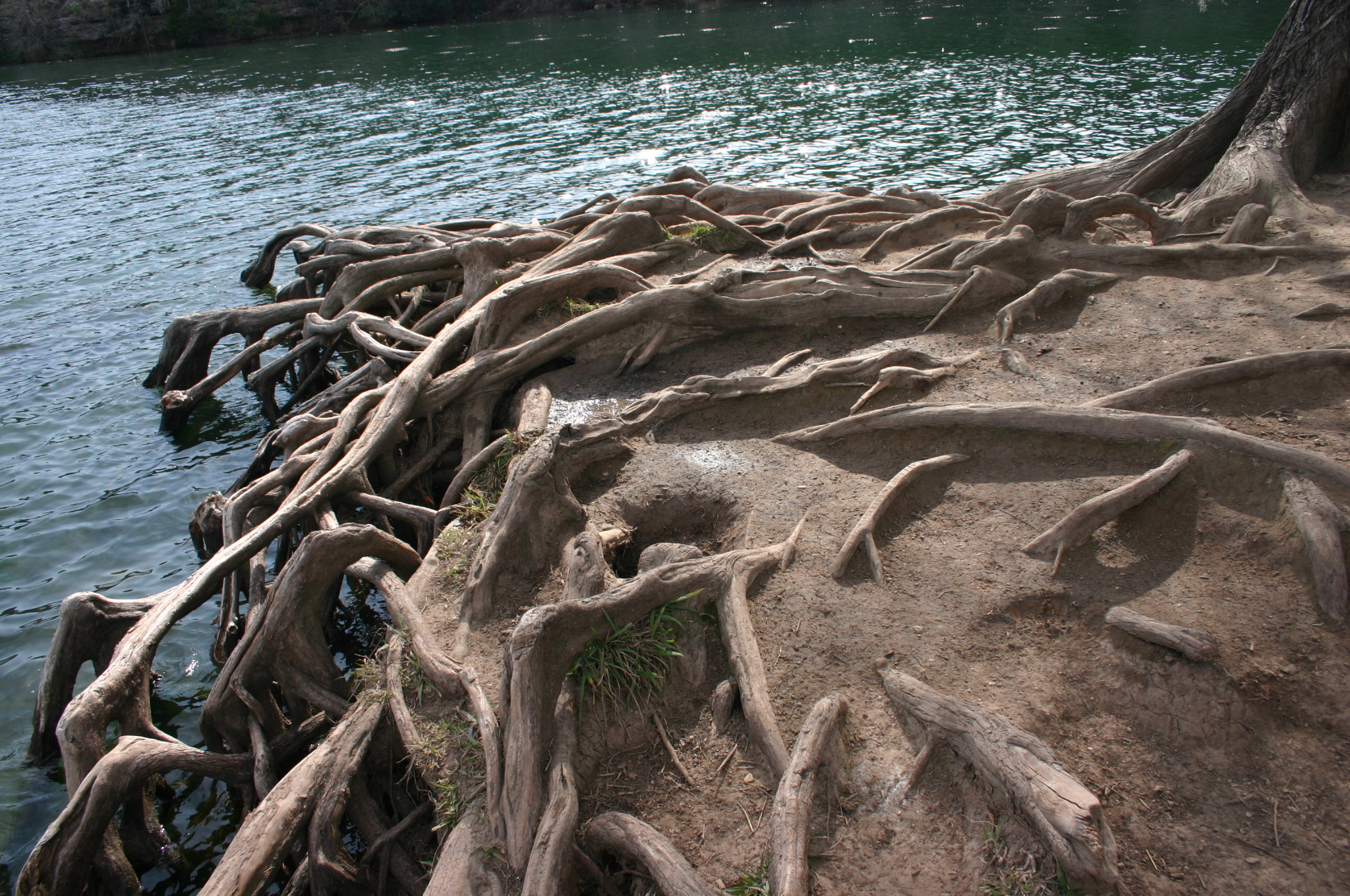
Roots can also protect the environment by holding the soil to reduce soil erosion.

Roots and tubers are some of the most widely harvested crops in the world.

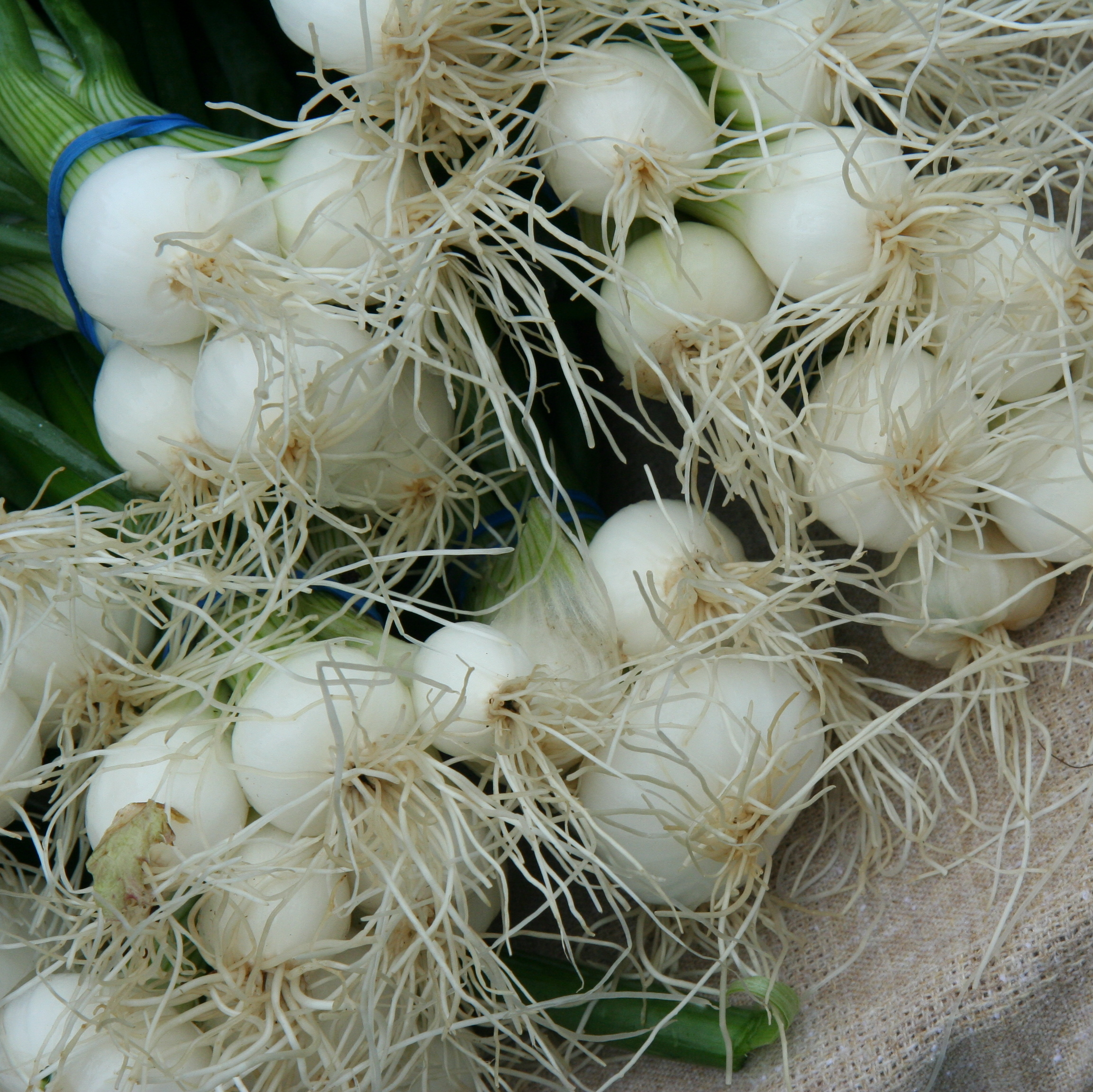
Roots on onion bulbs

The term root crops refers to any edible underground plant structure, but many root crops are actually stems, such as potato tubers. Edible roots include cassava, sweet potato, beet, carrot, rutabaga, turnip, parsnip, radish, yam and horseradish. Spices obtained from roots include sassafras, angelica, sarsaparilla and licorice.

Sugar beet is an important source of sugar. Yam roots are a source of estrogen compounds used in birth control pills. The fish poison and insecticide rotenone is obtained from roots of Lonchocarpus spp. Important medicines from roots are ginseng, aconite, ipecac, gentian and reserpine. Several legumes that have nitrogen-fixing root nodules are used as green manure crops, which provide nitrogen fertilizer for other crops when plowed under. Specialized bald cypress roots, termed knees, are sold as souvenirs, lamp bases and carved into folk art. Native Americans used the flexible roots of white spruce for basketry.

Tree roots can heave and destroy concrete sidewalks and crush or clog buried pipes. The aerial roots of strangler fig have damaged ancient Mayan temples in Central America and the temple of Angkor Wat in Cambodia.

Trees stabilize soil on a slope prone to landslides. The root hairs work as an anchor on the soil.

Vegetative propagation of plants via cuttings depends on adventitious root formation. Hundreds of millions of plants are propagated via cuttings annually including chrysanthemum, poinsettia, carnation, ornamental shrubs and many houseplants.

Roots can also protect the environment by holding the soil to reduce soil erosion. This is especially important in areas such as sand dunes.

Roots and tubers yield

Per capita production of roots and tubers

== See also ==
- Absorption of water
- Cypress knee
- Drought rhizogenesis
- Fibrous root system
- Mycorrhiza – root symbiosis in which individual hyphae extending from the mycelium of a fungus colonize the roots of a host plant.
- Mycorrhizal network
- Plant physiology
- Rhizosphere – region of soil around the root influenced by root secretions and microorganisms present
- Root cutting
- Rooting powder
- Stolon
- Tanada effect
- Taproot
