= Primordium =

Organ in the earliest recognizable stage of embryonic development

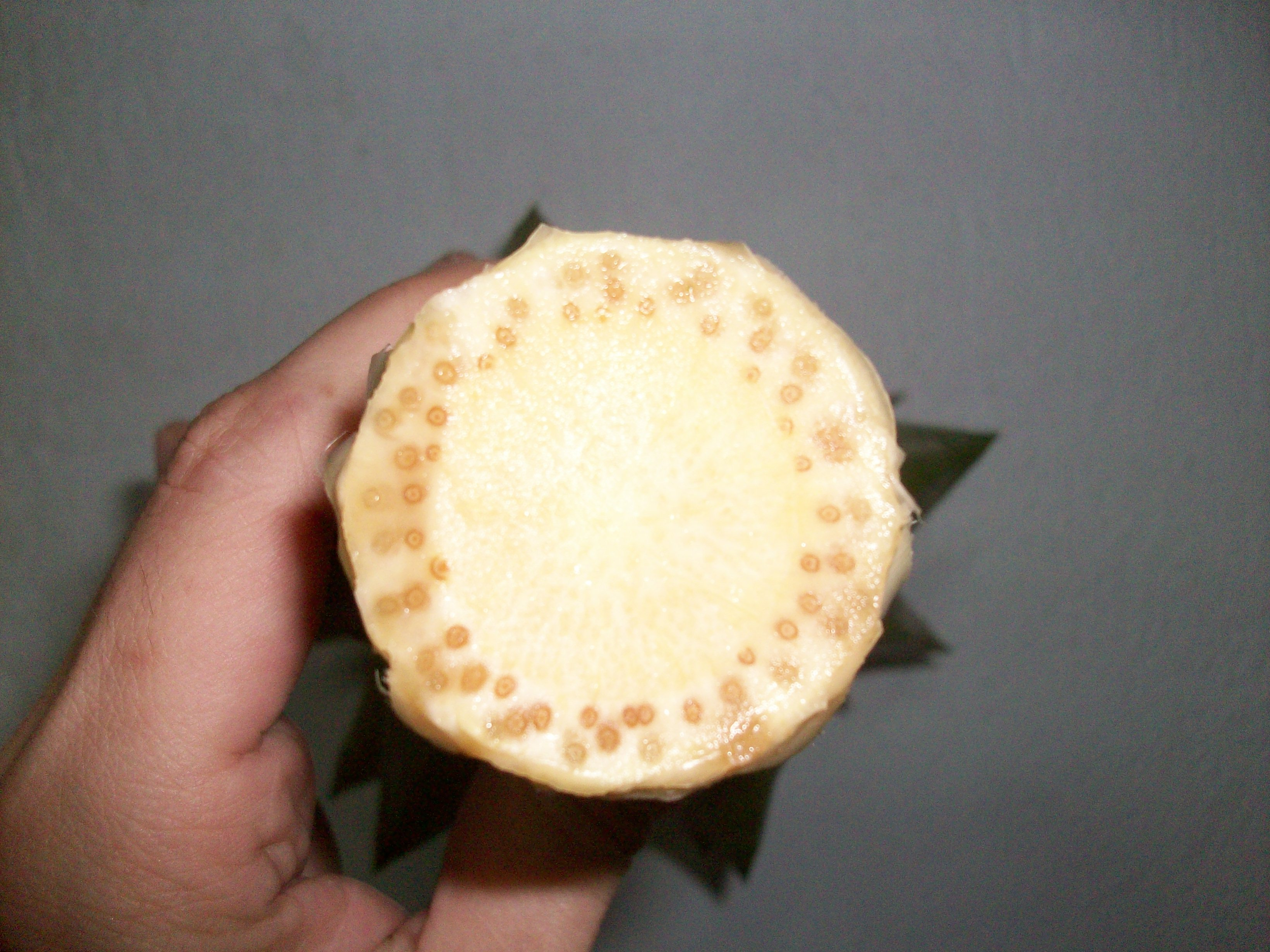
Root primordia (brown spots) as seen on the butt of a freshly cut pineapple crown intended for vegetative reproduction

A primordium (/praɪˈmɔːrdiəm/; pl.: primordia; synonym: anlage), in embryology, is an organ or tissue in its earliest recognizable stage of development. Cells of the primordium are called primordial cells. A primordium is the simplest set of cells capable of triggering growth of the would-be organ and the initial foundation from which an organ is able to grow. In flowering plants, a floral primordium gives rise to a flower.

Although it is a frequently used term in plant biology, the word is used in describing the biology of all multicellular organisms (for example: a tooth primordium in animals, a leaf primordium in plants or a sporophore primordium in fungi.)

== Primordium development in plants ==
Two primordia

New primordium forming

Generative spiral

Leaf migration

Plants produce both leaf and flower primordia cells at the shoot apical meristem (SAM). Primordium development in plants is critical to the proper positioning and development of plant organs and cells. The process of primordium development is intricately regulated by a set of genes that affect the positioning, growth and differentiation of the primordium. Genes including STM (shoot meristemless) and CUC (cup-shaped cotyledon) are involved in defining the borders of the newly formed primordium.

The plant hormone auxin has also been implicated in this process, with the new primordium being initiated at the placenta, where the auxin concentration is highest. There is still much to understand about the genes involved in primordium development.

Leaf primordia are groups of cells that will form into new leaves. These new leaves form near the top of the shoot and resemble knobby outgrowths or inverted cones. Flower primordia are the little buds we see at the end of stems, from which flowers will develop. Flower primordia start off as a crease or indentation and later form into a bulge. This bulging is caused by slower and less anisotropic, or directionally dependent, growth.

=== Primordium initiation ===
Primordia initiation is the precursor for the start of a primordium, and typically confers new growth (either flowers or leaves) in plants once fully mature. In pines, the leaf primordia develop into buds, which eventually elongate into shoots, then stems, then branches. Though primordia are typically only found in new flower and leaf growth, root primordia in plants can also be found, but are typically referred to as lateral root primordium or adventitious roots. The process of lateral root primordium initiation has been studied in Arabidopsis thaliana, though the process in other angiosperms is still under analysis. Primordia are initiated by local cell division and enlargement on the shoot apical meristem. At least in wheat plants, leaf primordium initiation rates increase with increasing ambient temperature, and the leaf number of some varieties decrease with increasing daylength.

=== Auxin's role in primordial development ===
Auxin is a group of plant hormones, or phytohormones, that plays a key role in almost all areas of the growth and development of plants. Auxin concentrations affect mitosis, cell expansion, as well as cell differentiation. There is a lot of current research being conducted to explain the role that it assists in the process of plant primordium. It is believed to control these processes by binding to a specific receptor on plant cells and influences gene expression. It affects transcription factors that control the upregulation or downregulation of auxin genes that relate to growth. This has led researchers to believe that auxin accumulation as well as decreases in auxin levels might control different phases of primordium development. Auxin concentration gradients are necessary to initiate and continue primordial growth. Higher concentrations allow them to bind to cells and results in downstream effects that lead to primordial growth. Auxins have a large impact on plant primordium development because of their effect on gene regulation.

== Root primordium ==
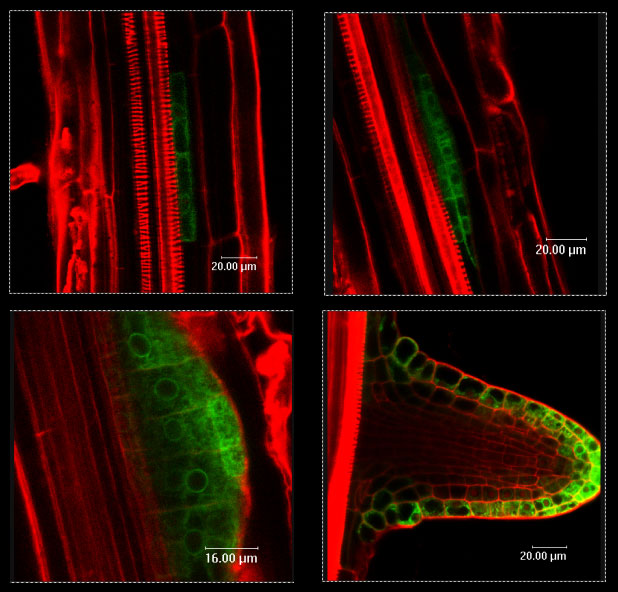
Lateral root primordia development and emergence in Arabidopsis thaliana

Lateral roots are one of the most important tissues in a plant's anatomical structure. They provide physical support and uptake water and nutrients for growth. Before the emergence of lateral roots in the morphogenetic process, a new lateral root primordium which consists of primordial cells is formed. Localized cell divisions in the Pericycle give rise to the lateral root primordia. This pattern of growth gives rise to a bundle of tissue. The subsequent accumulation of cell division and enlargement in this bundle of tissue gives rise to a new structure known as the root primordium. The root primordium emerges as a new lateral rootlet by creating its own root cap and apex. Both genetic and physiological studies point to the importance of Auxin in the LR initiation and primordium development in the LR formation process, but cytokinin negatively regulates the growth of the LR. However, it is not fully understood the full mechanisms of how these different hormones affect the transport, signaling, or biosynthesis of the others.

The PUCHI gene (specifically an Auxin regulated AP2/EREBP gene), plays a vital role in coordinating the organization/pattern of cell division during lateral root primordium (LRP) development, in Arabidopsis thaliana. PUCHI expression is regulated via Auxin concentration, and because of this, exogenous Auxin is required to increase the transcription of PUCHI genes. This allows us to infer that the PUCHI gene must be downstream to Auxin signaling. One method used to test the theory that PUCHI is responsible for LRP development, was by using Arabidopsis thaliana accession col as the wild type (WT) strain, and isolating the PUCHI-1-mutant from the T-DNA insertion. The function of the PUCHI gene was demonstrated by using the PUCHI-1 mutant (using Arabidopsis thaliana as the model plant), which if backcrossed three times to Arabidopsis thaliana accession col (WT), it was demonstrated to affect lateral root and flower primordium development by stunting LR growth. One of the many theories out there, is that Auxin promotes downstream PUCHI expression via a cascade signaling effect, by triggering ARF and Aux/IAA protein functions. PUCHI genes act as a transcriptional regulator of lateral root primordium development by controlling its cell division during this stage.

== Leaf primordium ==
Early events in leaf development fall into three main processes:

1. Initiation of the leaf primordium
2. Establishment of dorsoventrally (abaxial-adaxial polarity) which is established with bulging of the primordia
3. Development of a marginal meristem

Lateral organ and leaf development initiation is dependent upon the structure of the shoot apical meristem (SAM). In the center of the SAM, there is a central zone of many indeterminate, undifferentiated cells where cell division is infrequent. Cells divide more frequently in the peripheral zones flanking the SAM and are incorporated into leaf primordia, also referred to as founder cells for leaves. Cells are recruited from the flanks of the shoot apical meristem which initiates the development of leaf primordia.

Signals propagated in the epidermis initiate primordia growth in directions away from the cotyledons (in dicotyledonous plants) in simple patterns, known as phyllotaxis. Phyllotaxis are the arrangement of leaves on an axis or stem and can either be arranged in a spiral or whorl pattern moving out radially by continually dividing cells at their central edges. Phyllotactic patterns determine plant architecture and the positions of where new leaves will develop can be easily predicted by observing the locations of existing leaf primordia.

The key instructive signal for phyllotactic pattern formation is auxin. Leaf primordia are specified as auxin maxima in a flanking region of the SAM following the rules of phyllotaxy. Phyllotactic spiral patterns, as observed in Arabidopsis, have an unequal auxin distribution between left and right sides, resulting in asymmetrical growth of leaf laminas. For example, in clockwise phyllotactic spiral patterns, the left side will grow more than the right side and vice versa for counterclockwise phyllotactic spiral patterns. Leaf initiation requires high intracellular auxin concentration and is generated by directional auxin transport through the SAM. Once in the meristem, developing organ primordia act as a sink, absorbing and depleting auxin from the surrounding tissue. The accumulation of auxin in the developing organ primordia induces the formation of new leaf primordium. The SAM continues to produce leaf primordia regularly on its flanks throughout the vegetative phase.

== See also ==
- Morphogenesis
- Primordial phallus
- List of biological development disorders
