= Lateral root =

Plant root

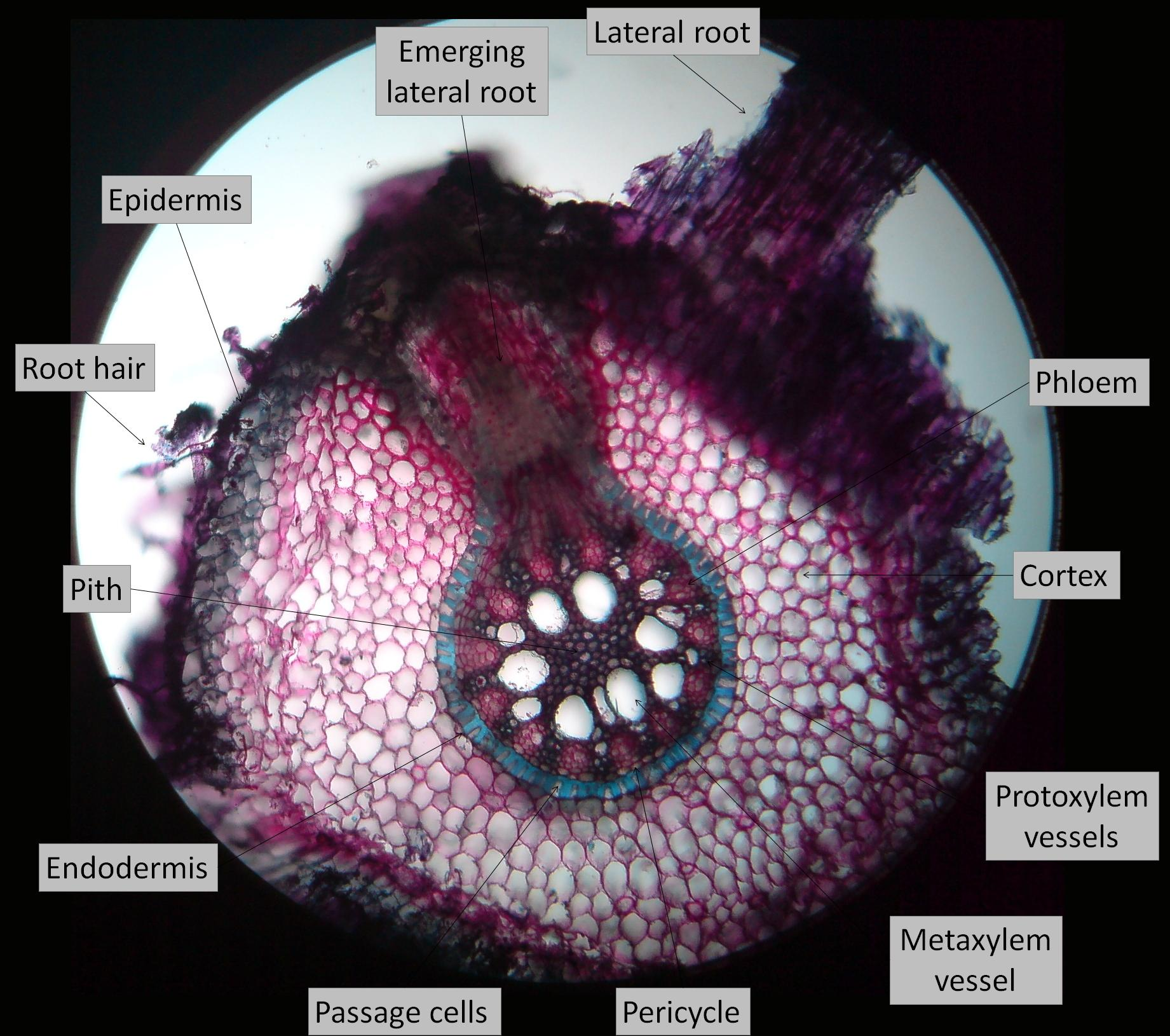
Lateral Root emerging from the pericycle (blue) in a cross-section of Iris germanico root

Lateral roots, emerging from the pericycle (meristematic tissue), extend horizontally from the primary root (radicle) and over time make up the iconic branching pattern of root systems. They contribute to anchoring the plant securely into the soil, increasing water uptake, and facilitate the extraction of nutrients required for the growth and development of the plant. Lateral roots increase the surface area of a plant's root system and can be found in great abundance in several plant species. In some cases, lateral roots have been found to form symbiotic relationships with rhizobia (bacteria) and mycorrhizae (fungi) found in the soil, to further increase surface area and increase nutrient uptake.

Several factors are involved in the formation and development of lateral roots. Regulation of root formation is tightly controlled by plant hormones such as auxin, and by the precise control of aspects of the cell cycle. Such control can be particularly useful, as increased auxin levels help to promote lateral root development, in young leaf primordia. This allows coordination of root development with leaf development, enabling a balance between carbon and nitrogen metabolism to be established.

== Morphology and Development ==
The general zones of the primary root (taproot) that gives rise to eventual lateral roots are presented below from top to bottom. The most mature and developed tissue is found near the top, while the newly dividing cells are found near the bottom.

Maturation Zone: Cells in this stage have developed differentiated characteristics and have completed maturation and elongation. The xylem system is seen to develop in this zone along with lateral root development.

Elongation Zone: Cells in this stage are rapidly elongating and parts of the phloem system (sieve tubes) start to develop. As you move up closer to the maturation zone, cell division and, elongation decrease.

Meristematic Zone: Right above the root cap and contains the "stem cells" of the plant. In this zone, cells are dividing quickly and there is little to no differentiation present.

Root Cap: Protective layer of cells that covers the meristematic tissue. The cells in this part of the root have been seen to play a critical role in gravitropic response and releasing secretions to mobilize nutrients.

The following description is for early events in lateral root formation of the model organism Arabidopsis thaliana:

Lateral root formation is initiated in pericycle (located between the endodermis and vascular tissue) of the root system, and begins with a process referred to as priming. In this stage, you have rhythmic bouts of gene expression and responses to auxin. If sufficient signaling is present, pre-branching sites are developed in basal portions of meristematic tissue that are stable in the presence of high auxin environments. These pre-branching sites go on to form the pericycle founder cells after they are stable and have high auxin accumulations. In some cases, the activation of auxin biosynthesis takes place in these founder cells to reach a stable threshold.

- Stage I: The first morphologically identifiable stage is the asymmetric division of two cells of the pericycle, termed pericycle founder cells, which are adjacent to the protoxylem poles and from which the lateral roots are derived entirely. These cells then undergo further division, causing radial expansion.
- Stage II: The small, central cells then divide periclinally (parallel to the surface of the plant body) in a series of transverse, asymmetric divisions such that the young primordium becomes visible as a projection made up of an inner layer and an outer layer.
- Stages III and IV: At the third stage, the outer layer of cells divide so that the primordium is now made of three layers. The fourth stage is then characterized by the inner layer undergoing a similar division, such that four cell layers are visible.
- Stages V to VIII: Expansion and further division of these four layers eventually result in the emergence of the young lateral root from the parent tissue (the overlying tissue of the primary root) at stage eight.

The number of lateral roots corresponds to the number of xylem bundles, and two lateral roots will never be found directly across from one another on the primary root.

== Signaling ==
Signaling is important for the overall development and growth of a plant, including the production of lateral roots. Several hormones are used by plants to communicate, and the same molecule can have starkly different effects in varying parts of the plant. Auxin is a good example of this, as it generally stimulates growth in the upper part of a plant when in high concentrations, but in roots, inhibits the elongation and growth of the roots when found in high concentrations. Root growth is often stimulated by another hormone, called ethylene, which is prevented from being produced in the roots when auxin levels are high. Additionally, it was found that low levels of auxin are actually found to stimulate the growth and elongation of the root system, even without the presence of ethylene. Cytokinin, another plant hormone, has also been seen to play a role in maintaining and developing the meristematic tissue of the root, and can often have an antagonistic relationship with auxin in root development.

Auxin Signaling

In a research study of auxin transport in Arabidopsis thaliana, auxin was found to be a critical plant hormone in the formation of lateral roots. In Stage I of early morphological stages, the division of pairs of pericycle founder cells were found in groups of eight or 10, suggesting that before this initial morphological stage, transverse divisions must be conducted first to precede lateral root initiation.

A specific auxin transport inhibitor, N-1-naphthylphthalamic acid (NPA) causes indoleacetic acid (IAA) accumulation in the root apical meristem, while simultaneously decreasing IAA in radical tissue required for lateral root growth.

Numerous mutants associated with auxin indicated an effect on lateral root development:

- alf4, which blocks the initiation of lateral root emergence.
- alf3, which inhibits the development of plant organs shortly after later root emergence.

The results from these mutants indicate that IAA is required for lateral roots in various stages of development.

Also, researchers found a close relationship between the position of the first division of lateral root formation and the root tip. A cycB1:1::uidA selectable marker was used as a reporter for lateral root initiation and its early mitotic events. This marker was histochemically stained for beta-glucuronidase (GUS) in Arabidopsis thaliana seedlings, which highlighted activity in the lateral root primordium and the transition zone between the hypocotyl and the root. Seedlings were harvested every day for a week and stained for GUS activity, then measured the primary root length as well as the distance to the root tip, the ratio between these two numbers being consistent. From this study, the following was concluded:

- There is a defined distance from the initiation of the lateral root and leaf primordia to their apical meristems.
- The tissues with zones of lateral root initiation are co-localized with the same root tissues that are involved in basipetal auxin transport.
- Basipetal auxin transport is necessary for the localization of IAA to the zone of lateral root initiation.

== PIN Transport Proteins ==
Auxin is responsible for generating concentration gradients to allow for proper plant development. As of 2020, one auxin transporter was identified as a means to flood the hormone into cells: AUXIN-RESISTANT1 (AUX1)/AUX1-LIKEs (LAXs). Also, two auxin transporters that allowed for the hormone to exit cells, PIN-FORMEDs (PINs) were established, as well as ATP-binding cassette Bs (ABCBs)/P-glycoproteins (PGPs). PIN proteins steer auxin to areas of necessity throughout the plant. These proteins present in the apical meristem of the plant direct auxin downward through the plant, a process independent of gravity. Once in the vicinity of the root, vascular cylinder cells shuttle auxin towards the center of the root cap. Lateral root cells then absorb the phytohormone through AUX1 permease. PIN proteins recirculate the auxin upwards to the plant shoots for direct access to the zone of elongation. Once utilized there, the proteins are then shuttled back to the lateral roots and their corresponding root caps. This entire process is known as the foundation model.

In Arabidopsis thaliana, PIN proteins are localized in cells based on the size of their loop that connects the intercellular matrix to the extracellular matrix. Shorter PIN proteins (PINs 1-4, 6, 7) are found intracellularly as well as nearest to the plasma membrane, whereas the longer proteins (PINs 5, 8) are found almost exclusively by the plasma membrane.

The protein PIN8 significantly influences the development of lateral roots in a plant. When a nonfunctional mutant of the protein, pin8, was inserted into a plasmid, the lateral roots of Arabidopsis thaliana had a decrease in root density. It was shown that this mutant had no lingering effects on the development of the primary root. When further investigated, it was discovered that the pin8 mutant was significant only as the lateral root was beginning to appear in the plant, suggesting that a function PIN8 protein is responsible for this action.
