= Epiblem =

In botany, epiblem is a tissue that replaces the epidermis in most roots and in stems of submerged aquatic plants. It is usually located between the epidermis and cortex in the root or stem of a plant.
