= Canopy root =

Type of tree root

A canopy root, also known as an arboreal root, is a type of root that grows out of a tree branch underneath an epiphytic mat. These adventitious roots form in response to moist, dark, nutrient-rich conditions that are found in “canopy soils”. Canopy roots have been found in species of maple, poplar, alder, myrtle, beech, and spruce, among many others. They are structurally similar to roots found on the forest floor and likely serve a similar purpose for water and nutrient uptake, though their specific functions are still being studied.

== Formation and ecology ==
Canopy roots form in highly organic soils classified as arboreal Histosols. Canopy soils form when lateral branches intercept leaf litter and epiphytes, accumulating plant matter that eventually decomposes. In some cases, these soils can get up to a meter thick on a single branch. Canopy soils provide habitat for wildlife and epiphytes, hold water and nutrients, and contain diverse microbial communities. Mycorrhizal fungi and nitrogen fixing bacteria have been found in these soils, making nitrogen available for plant uptake.

Adventitious roots can form during normal or stressful growing conditions. Canopy roots have been shown to grow in response to wet, nutrient-rich media. Nadkarni induced the formation of canopy roots by air layering branches, which involves wounding a branch and then wrapping it with damp moss. Nadkarni found that, after initiating air layering, roots form out of swollen lenticels on the stem.

== Mechanism of development ==
While the specific physiological mechanism causing canopy root development has not been determined, it is thought to follow a similar process of other adventitious roots, such as burial-induced stem roots. Once a receptor in the stem perceives the moist, dark environment, auxin levels increase quickly and levels of cytokinin, a root inhibitor, drop. This influx of auxin, likely due to increased synthesis, transport from other cells, and decreased degradation, promotes root growth. Canopy roots have been shown to associate with mycorrhizal fungi, which suggests they are absorbing nutrients and water from soils. Nalini Nadkarni and Richard Primack showed that tagged radionuclides of trace nutrients (Se, Cs, Mn, Zn) entered through the canopy roots and were transported to other areas of the plant. This proves that plants can take in nutrients from canopy roots, supporting the idea that the canopy roots provide access to secondary nutrient pools. Current research is being done to show that the canopy roots uptake water as well as nutrients.
