= Root phenotypic plasticity =

Phenotypic plasticity is the ability of an individual organism to alter its behavior, morphology and physiology in response to changes in environmental conditions. Root phenotypic plasticity enables plants to adapt to an array of biotic and abiotic constraints that limit plant productivity. Even though the exploitation of soil resources through root activity is energetically costly, natural selection favors plants that can direct root activity to exploit efficiently the heterogeneous distribution of soil resources.

Studying how plants adapt their root architecture to abiotic and biotic stressors can give us insights on how to increase food production. This is extremely important since we project our population to gain 2.3 billion people by the year 2050, which will require an increase in food production by 25–70%. Malnutrition afflicts approximately 795 million people, particularly in sub-Saharan Africa where one in four people are malnourished. Research on root architecture plasticity of staple crops may help us develop cultivars with increased capacity for soil resource acquisition. Hence, help us improve crop yields in marginal environments.

== Root architecture ==
Root architecture refers to the spatial configuration of a plant's root system. The root architecture plays an important role in acquiring a secure supply of water and nutrients, as the acquisition of these resources drives plant growth. In addition to nutrient absorption, the root architecture provides a plant with anchorage and support. Root systems are considered to be very diverse, showing variation among species, genotypes of a given species and even within a single root system.

We can classify the architecture of a root system using the following metrics: Branch magnitude (number of links), Topology (branching pattern), Link length (distance between branches), Root angle (radial angle between a branch and its parent root ) and the Link radius (root diameter).

== Root phenes ==
Phenes are the fundamental units of the phenotype that are both unique and elementary to a given level of biological organization. A phene state is the outcome of complex synergistic developmental systems, influenced by genes and gene products, as well as the environment. Root architectural and anatomical phenes determine the temporal and spatial distribution of root foraging in specific soil domains, and therefore affect resource capture. Mobile resources, such as nitrate and water are generally found in deeper soil domains over time due to crop uptake, evaporation, and leaching throughout the growth season. Whereas, immobile soil nutrients, including phosphorus and potassium, are more available in the topsoil. In a heterogenous matrix of soil, plants that are able to acquire edaphic resources at reduced metabolic cost will be favored, as these plants can allocate more resources towards growth, continued soil resource and reproduction.

== Root plasticity ==
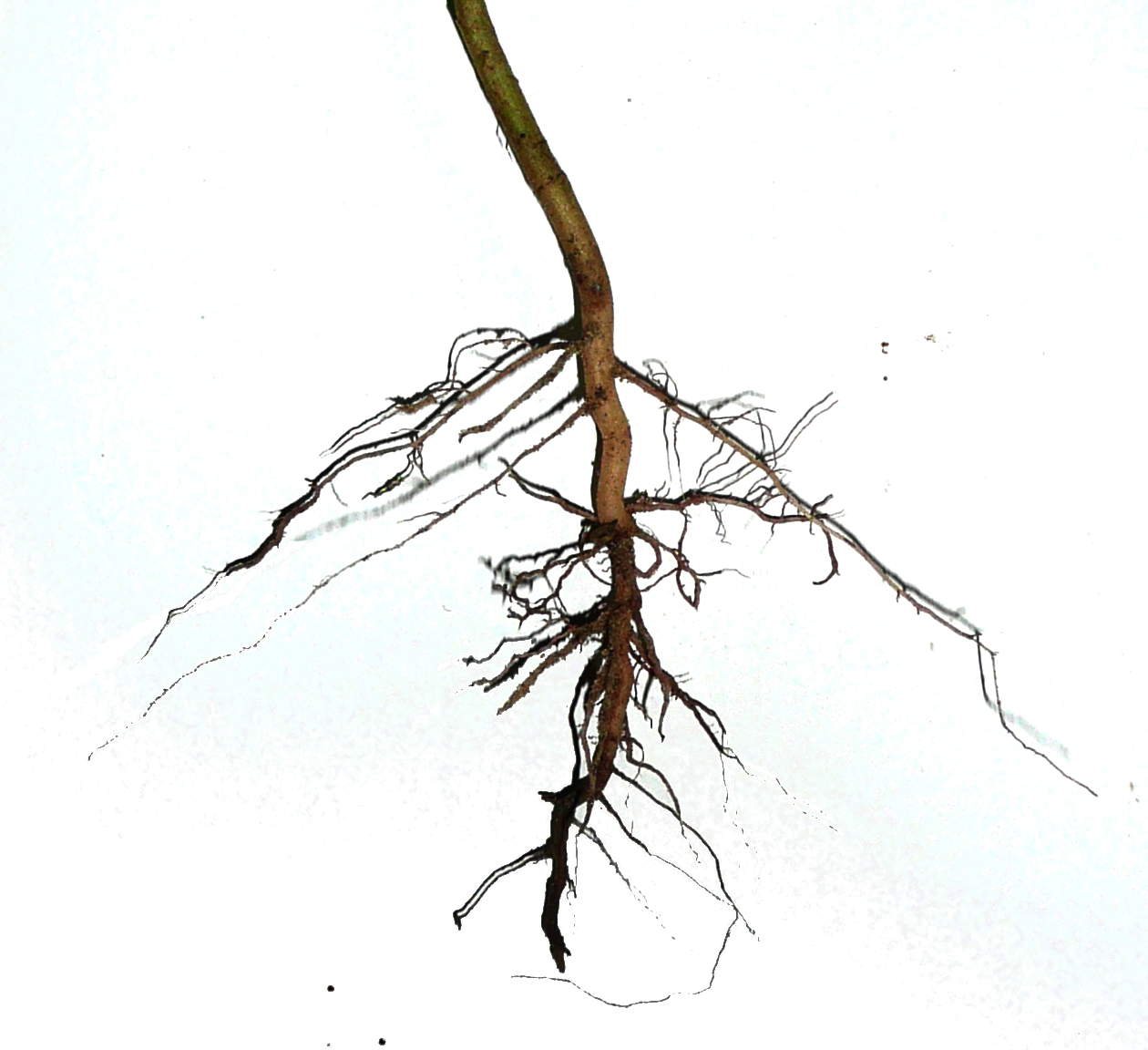
Plant in low-P environments can increase their lateral roots growth to increase P capture.

Root phenotypic plasticity enables plants to adapt to an array of biotic and abiotic constraints that limit plant productivity. According to Lynch 2018, Phosphorus (P), nitrogen (N), and water are the three principal resources most often limiting plant growth. Given that soil resources may be unevenly distributed, or subject to local depletion, a plant's ability to adapt to spatiotemporal changes in their environment can provide a fitness advantage over others. In particular, plants can adjust root phenotype by 1) changing their investment of biomass in shoots and roots on an individual level, 2) change their architecture on an organ level, or 3) modify their root anatomy on a module-level. Even though the exploitation of soil resources through root activity is energetically costly, natural selection favors plants that can direct root activity to exploit efficiently the heterogeneous distribution of soil resources.

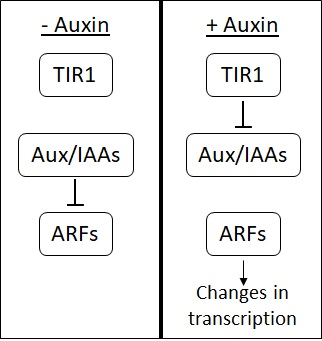
Auxin signal system

=== Auxin's role in root plasticity ===
The hormone that is found in multiple steps of lateral root development is called auxin. Auxin appears in the initiation, emergence and elongation of the roots. Auxin signals regulate the direction auxin efflux and auxin flow throughout the cell. This regulation is what directs and aids in lateral root development. Lateral root initiation requires auxin signaling and protein degradation in order to activate through a series of enzymes and protein interactions. With many well characterized cell divisions it gives rise to lateral root emergence. Auxin signaling and the activity of the PUCHI gene interact by PUCHI gene encoding a transcription factor that is unregulated by auxin. Root elongation requires polarized auxin to transport and create an auxin maximum at the very tip of the LRP. In order for this activation to occur, auxin influx and efflux activity must be regulated within the plant cell. Lateral root developmental strategies indicated adaptations of the root system to different environmental niches.

=== Root phenotypic plasticity of Phaseolus vulgaris L. ===
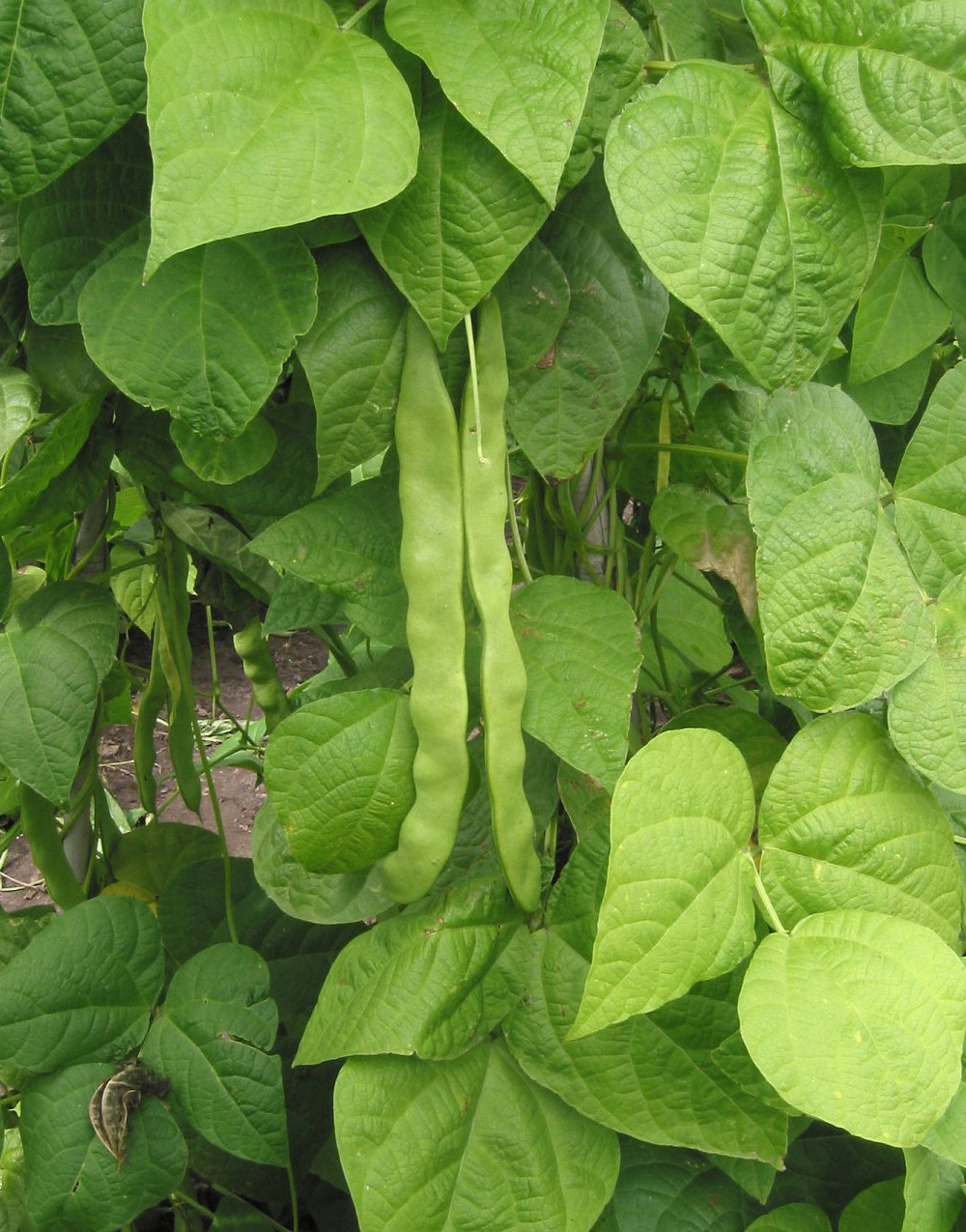
Phaseolus vulgaris L

The Phaseolus vulgaris L, also known as the common bean, is native to the Americas. It is a principal food crop in tropical and subtropical regions, where its production is often limited by low P availability. Phosphorus is generally more available near the surface strata due to deposition of plant residues at the soil surface and low mobility in the soil. Therefore, root phenes that increase the exploration of surface strata have higher probability of capturing P.

Studies on the common bean have observed longer and denser lateral branching in beans under low P conditions. Genotypic markers responsible for P efficiency are highly correlated to plants with highly branched root systems and a large number of apices. Recent bean studies support that architectural differences could widely influence a plant's efficiency of Phosphorus acquisition.

=== Role of auxin in root plasticity under low P ===
Alteration in root architecture under low P is linked with changes in phytohormone composition and concentration, and involves expression of a number of genes. Treatment with hormone antagonists and related mutants indicate that auxin are essential for the development of extra root hairs in response to P deficiency.

There is growing evidence suggesting that auxins act as signaling intermediates in the response of root architecture to low P supply. In an experiment, researchers applied an auxin-transport inhibitor naphthylphthalamic acid (NPA) at the root-shoot junction. They observed a decrease in the number and density of lateral roots. Genetic approaches have also established the connection between auxin and lateral root development, where mutants with reduced sensitivity to auxin exhibit reduction or loss of lateral roots. Nonetheless, the exact mechanism of how auxin does this remains unknown.

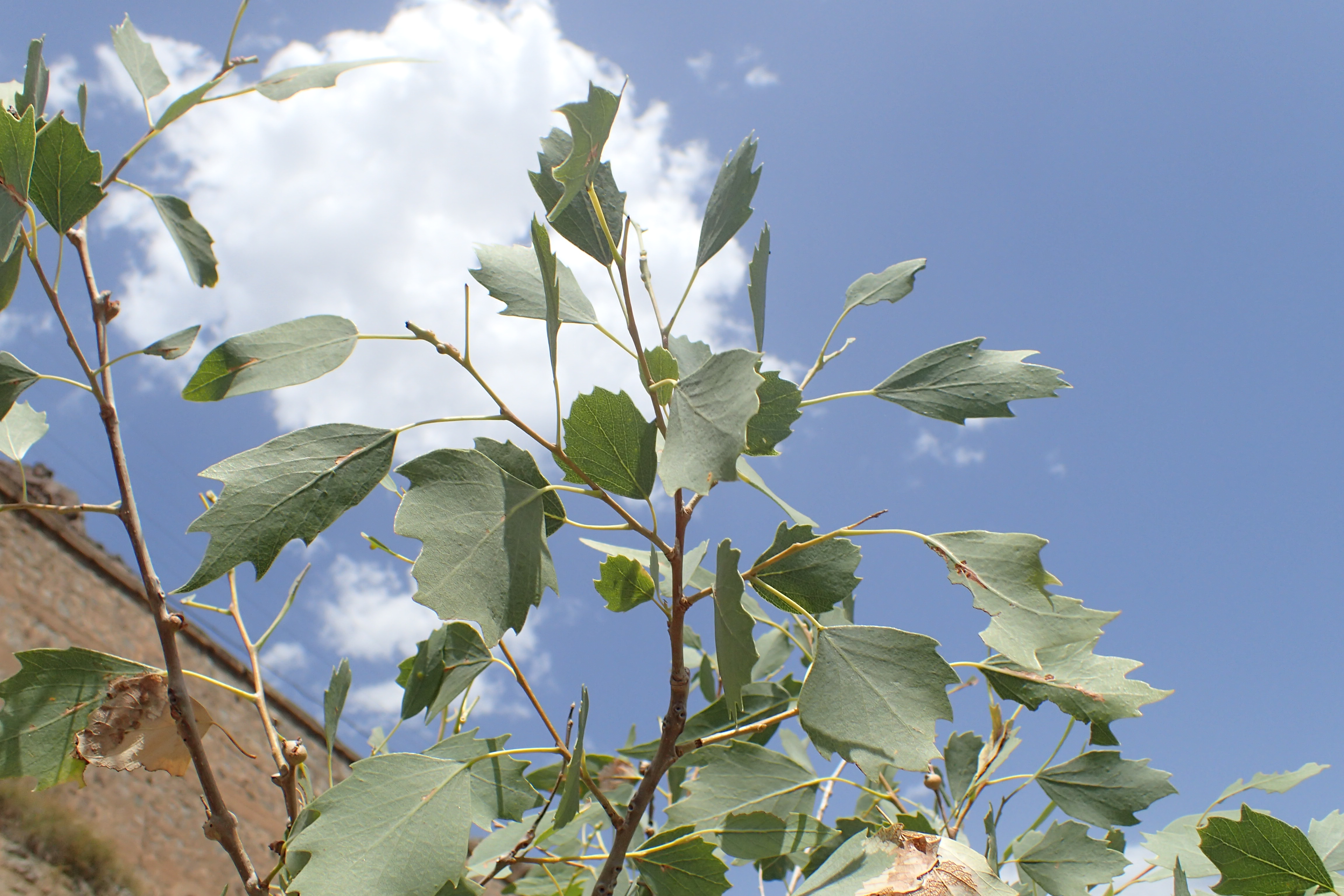
Populus euphratica

=== Root phenotypic plasticity of Populus euphratica ===
The Populus euphratica typically grows on the floodplains of arid regions of Central Asia, making them prone to suffer from drought stress. As discussed earlier, low water availability can suppress growth, including root growth. To overcome this, the P. euphratica seedlings can adjust their root allocation and root architecture and anatomy to locate and acquire groundwater. In addition, the seedlings have to develop a deep root system during the very early stages of life, due to their environment and only having access to water during a flood. In order for them to survive they have to uptake enough water for them to be able to withstand the following year.

A study conducted at the State Forest Farm in China sought to learn how P. euphratica seedling roots change phenotypically under drought stress. Researchers measured phenotypic changes in one-year-old P. euphratica seedlings under three different water treatments: 1) control (50–60% of field capacity), 2) moderate (30–40% of field capacity) and 3) severe drought stress treatments. After 60 days, they estimated the length of total, lateral, and distal roots, the average diameter of the total roots, the number of lateral roots, as well as the external path length (pe), magnitude (μ), and altitude (a). Finally, to quantify deep rooting capacity of the seedlings, they assessed the effects of root mass fraction (RMF), taproot mass fraction (TRMF), and specific taproot length (STRL) on relative root depth (RRD).

The researchers' findings suggest that drought conditions caused a dramatic decrease in the biomass of different plant parts, total root length, the average length of lateral roots and distal roots, and taproot length. The results showed that RMF and TRMF increased markedly with increasing drought severity, while STRL did not significantly increase under drought condition. Which signified that drought stress had a positive effect on RRD. Under moderate drought conditions, root architectural changes exerted a predominant effect on increased RRD, but under severe drought, root-shoot allocation and root architecture played equally important roles. These results tell us that the root architecture adjustments being made and root-shoot allocation caused deep rooting in P. euphratica seedlings under high drought conditions. Morphological changes seemed to only play a small role. They concluded that P. euphratica seedlings rely mostly on the adjustment of root architecture to maintain root depth under moderate drought conditions. However, they found that root-shoot allocation responds more under severe drought conditions.
