= PIN proteins =

Family of transport proteins

Auxin efflux carrier component 1

Identifiers
- Organism: Arabidopsis thaliana
- Symbol: PIN1
- Entrez: 843693
- Orthologs: NCBI: entry; OMA: entry
- PDB: 1J6Y
- RefSeq (mRNA): NM_106017.4
- RefSeq (Prot): NP_177500.1
- UniProt: Q9C6B8

Other data
- Chromosome: 1: 27.66 - 27.66 Mb
Search for
- Structures: Swiss-model
- Domains: InterPro

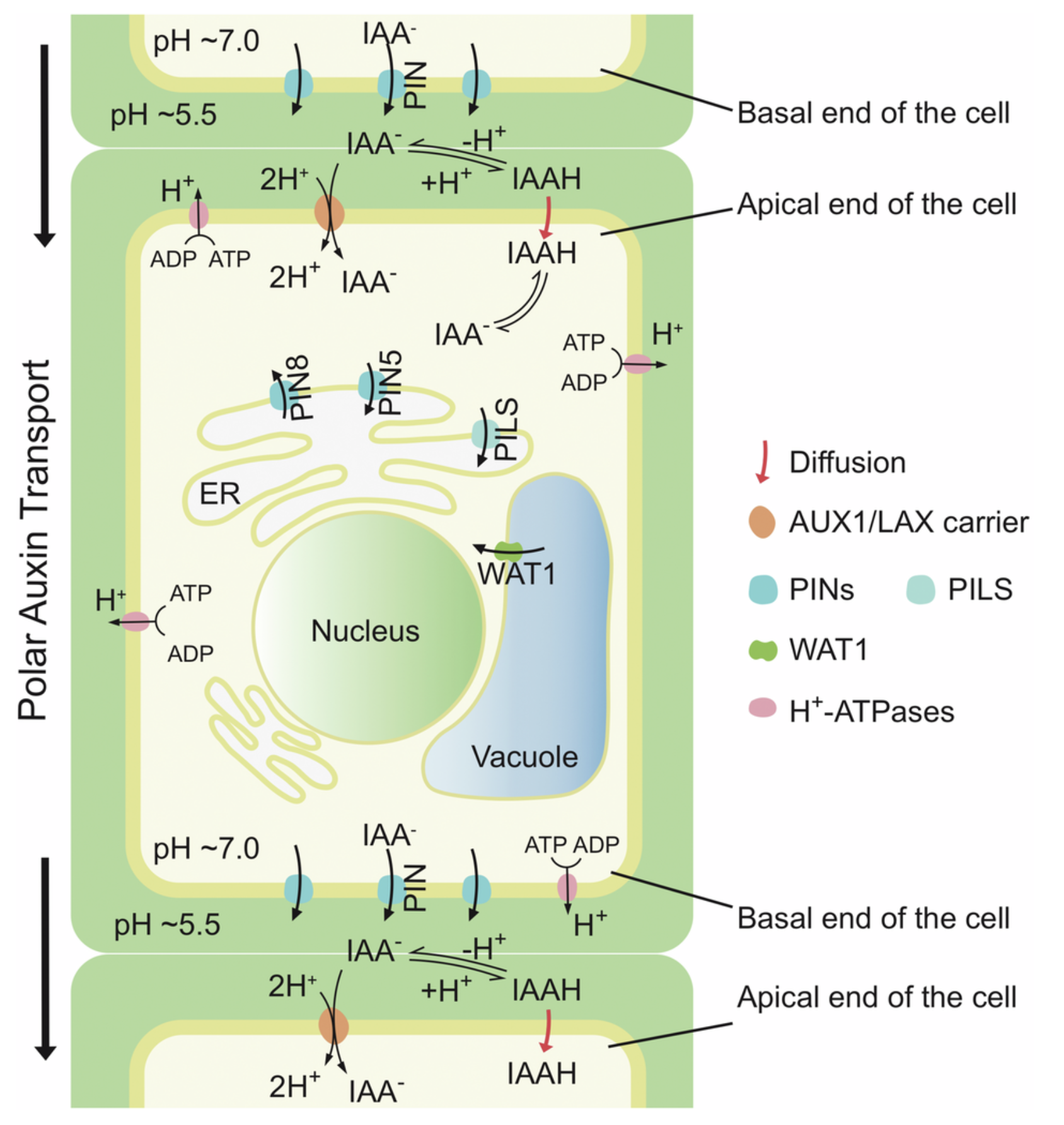
Polar auxin transport regulated by PIN proteins

PIN proteins are integral membrane proteins in plants that transport the anionic form of the hormone auxin across membranes. The discovery of the initial member of the PIN gene family, PIN1, occurred through the identification of the pin-formed1 (pin1) mutation in Arabidopsis thaliana. This mutation led to a stem that lacked almost all organs, including leaves and flowers.

Most of the PIN proteins (e.g. PIN1/2/3/4/7 in the model plant Arabidopsis thaliana) localize at the plasma membrane (PM) where they serve as secondary active transporters involved in the efflux of auxin. The PM-localized PIN proteins show asymmetrical localizations on the membrane and are, therefore, responsible for polar auxin transport. Some other members of the PIN family (e.g. PIN5 and 8 in Arabidopsis) localize mostly at the ER-membrane or have a dual PM and ER localization (e.g. PIN6 in Arabidopsis). These PIN proteins regulate the partitioning of auxin within the cell.

The PM-localized PIN proteins physically interact with a few members of the large PGP family of transporters that also work as auxin efflux carriers (PGP1 and PGP19 in Arabidopsis). These interactions result in a synergistic increase in auxin efflux.

The activity and localization of the PM-localized PIN proteins are regulated by several phosphorylations on their large cytosolic hydrophilic loop carried out by kinases of the AGC family (e.g. PID, WAG1, WAG2, PID2 in Arabidopsis) and the D6PK kinase.

== Maintenance of polarity ==
PIN proteins in the plasma membrane organize into clusters of different sizes, each diffusing at varying rates. These clusters play crucial roles in signal transduction by amplifying signals, increasing sensitivity, and connecting with intracellular trafficking pathways like endocytosis. Within these clusters, the agglomerations of auxin transporters are vital for maintaining their polarity, as they have lower mobility compared to dispersed proteins. PIN clustering and mobility depend on phosphoinositides, particularly PIN2's interaction with them, and enzymes like PIP5K1, shaping PIN cluster-like aggregates. Interestingly, PIN clusters don't align with REMORIN 1.2 but are affected by elevated salicylic acid levels or REM1.2, which induce hyperclustering of PIN2, influencing auxin distribution. Moreover, connections between the plasma membrane, cell wall, and the composition of molecules like pectin and cellulose influence PIN clustering, impacting auxin transport. Lastly, the microtubule cytoskeleton regulates PIN lateral diffusion, underscoring how cell wall chemistry and plasma membrane lipids control auxin transporter clustering, ultimately impacting Polar Auxin Transport (PAT).

== Auxin feedback ==
The impact of auxin on PIN polarity has been a subject of interest for many years, with various models suggesting that auxin's feedback occurs through PIN membrane cycling dynamics. However, recent advancements have challenged this hypothesis, with both natural and synthetic auxins promoting PIN2 endocytosis at low concentrations. The positive effect of auxin on PIN2 endocytosis may result in the retention of PIN2 polarity, which is potentially relevant for auxin regulation and its polar distribution. Auxin-mediated re-arrangements of PIN polarity rely on changes in transcriptional gene expression activated by auxin signaling, with the auxin-responsive transcriptional activator WKY23 being a crucial factor required for this process. The receptor complex CAMEL–CAR, which phosphorylates PINs and regulates their polarity via subcellular trafficking, is required for the polarization of individual cells and represents a mechanism of auxin feedback on its transport machinery. Auxin induces a complex transcriptional mechanism that regulates many genes but also causes a fast, non-transcriptional response, targeting proteins like Myosin XI and its adaptor MadB2. This rapid auxin response plays a crucial role in multiple developmental processes.
