= Phonotropism =

Phonotropism is the growth of organisms in response to sound stimuli. Root phonotropism is when the roots of a plant grow towards or away in response to a sound source. Acoustic cues are detected by the plant as sound waves which then induces a mechanistic response that changes plant behavior. Plants adapt to respond to external stimuli because of their sessile nature, and it is evolutionarily plausible that these organisms have adapted to take advantage of these inputs to help foraging behavior or defense mechanisms. Arabidopsis roots have been observed to gravitate towards sounds of flowing water, while caterpillar feeding vibrations alone are sufficient to alter plant defense hormones and volatile emissions in Arabidopsis leaves.

== Proposed mechanism ==
Although the exact mechanisms to how plants interpret sounds are yet to be determined, there are model proposals of how sound vibrations are perceived and transduced in plant cells. Given the physical nature of sounds often communicated through waves in the form of vibrations, one of the most promising models suggest that sound vibrations are likely first perceived in plant cells by the mechanoreceptors on the plasma membranes. Both non-specific MSL channels and Ca2+ specific MCA mechano-sensitive channels of the cell membrane are activated to start the Sound-vibration (SV) signaling cascade. Efflux and influx of Ca2+, the secondary messenger likely starts a signaling cascade inducing the activation/inhibition of many proteins downstream such as kinases that regulate transcription factors that later regulate the gene expression of the plant. Different sound vibration frequencies must affect different channels on the plant membrane to express distinct Ca2+ signature responses which then leads to different behavioral responses in the plant. This enables the plant to respond differently to different sounds.

== Experiments ==
=== Foraging ===
A paper by Rodrigo-Moreno et al., performed a neat experiment on Arabidopsis seedlings, to test whether the roots could respond to sound of water flow. A sound of 200 Hz was generated by a software and placed on a different shelf to prevent large vibration from being transduced. The Arabidopsis seedlings were grown on the agar surface of a petri dish. Experiment results showed that the seedling roots demonstrated phonotropic growth by gravitating towards the sound source when treated with sound for 2 weeks. The investigators set up control groups to control for growth conditions, but results remained unchanged with the seedlings growing consistently towards the sounds source. Interestingly, these sound-treated phonotropic roots had significantly fewer lateral roots than the untreated group which researchers have found to be linked to a high K+ efflux response associated with plant sounds perception. Sound also triggered changes in cytosolic Ca2+ levels of cells and the response was seen 2 minutes after sounds exposure, indicating that plants can detect sound and react in a matter of minutes.

=== Defense ===
A paper by Appel & Body et al., demonstrated that Arabidopsis responded to sound vibrations made by caterpillars munching on leaves. Investigators noticed that insect feeding behavior led to lowered hormone levels and increased defense molecules called volatile organic compounds (VOCs). These observations led them to wonder whether it was the wounding of the plant or the sound vibrations of insect feeding that induced this response. The feeding vibrations of a caterpillar was recorded and played back with a speaker to recreate sound vibration without damaging the plant leaves. After a series of experiments, results showed that vibrations alone were sufficient to initiate a defense response in these plants, while reducing hormone levels. Wounding itself was not necessary to decrease phytohormones and increase VOC emissions.
