= Pericycle =

Layer of parenchyma or sclerenchyma cells

The pericycle is a cylinder of parenchyma or sclerenchyma cells that lies just inside the endodermis and is the outer most part of the stele of plants.

Although it is composed of non-vascular parenchyma cells, it is still considered part of the vascular cylinder because it arises from the procambium as do the vascular tissues it surrounds.

In eudicots, it also has the capacity to produce lateral roots. Branch roots arise from this primary meristem tissue. In plants undergoing secondary growth, the pericycle contributes to the vascular cambium often diverging into a cork cambium.

In angiosperms certain molecules within the endodermis and the surrounding vasculature are sent to the pericycle which promotes the growth of the root meristems.

== Location ==
The pericycle is located between the endodermis and phloem in plant roots. In dicot stems, it is situated around the ring of vascular bundles in the stele.

== Function ==
In dicot roots, the pericycle strengthens the roots and provides protection for the vascular bundles.

In dicot root, the vascular cambium is completely secondary in origin, and it originates from a portion of pericycle tissue.

The pericycle regulates the formation of lateral roots by rapidly dividing near the xylem elements of the root.

It has been known to often be confused with other parts of the plant. However, its unique ring structure allows it to be more easily identified.

Past efforts to isolate such tissue have been successful. Monocot roots rarely branch, but can, and this branch will originate from the pericycle.
