= Plant development =

Process by which structures originate and mature as a plant grows

Important structures in plant development are buds, shoots, roots, leaves, and flowers; plants produce these tissues and structures throughout their life from meristems located at the tips of organs, or between mature tissues. Thus, a living plant always has embryonic tissues. By contrast, an animal embryo will very early produce all of the body parts that it will ever have in its life. When the animal is born (or hatches from its egg), it has all its body parts and from that point will only grow larger and more mature. However, both plants and animals pass through a phylotypic stage that evolved independently and that causes a developmental constraint limiting morphological diversification.

According to plant physiologist A. Carl Leopold, the properties of organization seen in a plant are emergent properties which are more than the sum of the individual parts. "The assembly of these tissues and functions into an integrated multicellular organism yields not only the characteristics of the separate parts and processes but also quite a new set of characteristics which would not have been predictable on the basis of examination of the separate parts."

== Growth ==
A vascular plant begins from a single celled zygote, formed by fertilisation of an egg cell by a sperm cell. From that point, it begins to divide to form a plant embryo through the process of embryogenesis. As this happens, the resulting cells will organize so that one end becomes the first root while the other end forms the tip of the shoot. In seed plants, the embryo will develop one or more "seed leaves" (cotyledons). By the end of embryogenesis, the young plant will have all the parts necessary to begin in its life.

=== Plant organogenesis ===
Once the embryo germinates from its seed or parent plant, it begins to produce additional organs (leaves, stems, and roots) through the process of organogenesis. New roots grow from root meristems located at the tip of the root, and new stems and leaves grow from shoot meristems located at the tip of the shoot. Branching occurs when small clumps of cells left behind by the meristem, and which have not yet undergone cellular differentiation to form a specialized tissue, begin to grow as the tip of a new root or shoot. Growth from any such meristem at the tip of a root or shoot is termed primary growth and results in the lengthening of that root or shoot. Secondary growth results in widening of a root or shoot from divisions of cells in a cambium.

=== Direct organogenesis ===
Direct organogenesis is a method of plant tissue culture in which organs like roots and shoots develop directly from meristematic or non-meristematic cells, bypassing the callus formation stage. This process takes place through the activation of shoot and root apical meristems or axillary buds, influenced by internal or externally applied plant growth regulators. As a result, specific cell types differentiate to form plant structures that can grow into whole plants. This technique is commonly used for propagating various plant species, including vegetables, fruits, woody plants, and medicinal plants. Shoot tips and nodal segments are typically used as explants in this process. In some cases, adventitious structures arise from somatic tissues under specific conditions, allowing for the regeneration of shoots or roots in areas where they would not naturally develop. This approach is particularly effective in herbaceous species, and while adventitious regeneration can lead to a higher rate of shoot formation, axillary shoot proliferation remains the most widely used method in micropropagation due to its efficiency and practicality. The general sequence of organ development in this process follows the pattern: Primary Explant → Meristemoid → Organ Primordium.

=== Indirect organogenesis ===
Indirect organogenesis is a developmental process in which plant cells undergo dedifferentiation, allowing them to revert from their specialized state and transition into a new developmental pathway. This process is characterized by an intermediate callus stage, where cells lose their original identity and become morphologically adaptable, serving as the foundation for organ formation. The progression of indirect organogenesis involves several key phases, beginning with dedifferentiation, which enables the cells to attain competence, followed by an induction stage that leads to a fully determined state. Once determination is achieved, the cells undergo morphological changes, ultimately giving rise to functional shoots or roots. This process follows a structured developmental sequence: Primary Explant → Callus → Meristemoid → Organ Primordium, ensuring the organized formation of plant organs.

== Factors affecting organogenesis ==
=== Explant ===
The ability to regenerate plants successfully depends on selecting the right explant, which varies among species and plant varieties. In direct organogenesis, explants sourced from meristematic tissues, such as shoot tips, lateral buds, leaves, petioles, roots, and floral structures, are often preferred due to their ability to rapidly develop into new organs. These tissues have high survival rates, fast growth, and strong regenerative potential in vitro. Meristems, shoot tips, axillary buds, immature leaves, and embryos are particularly effective in promoting regeneration across a wide range of plant species.

Additionally, mature plant parts, including leaves, stems, roots, petioles, and flower segments, can also serve as viable explants for organ formation under suitable conditions. Plant regeneration occurs through the formation of callus, an undifferentiated mass of cells that later gives rise to new organs. Callus formation can be induced from various explants, such as cotyledons, hypocotyls, stems, leaves, shoot apices, roots, inflorescences, and floral structures, when cultured under controlled conditions.

Generally, explants containing actively dividing cells are more effective for callus initiation, as they have a higher capacity for cellular reprogramming. Immature tissues tend to be more adaptable for regeneration compared to mature tissues due to their increased developmental plasticity. The size and shape of the explant also influence the success of culture establishment, as larger or more structurally favorable explants may enhance the chances of survival and growth. Callus development is primarily triggered by wounding and the presence of plant hormones, which may be naturally present in the tissue or supplemented in the growth medium to stimulate cellular activity and organ formation.

=== Culture medium, plant growth regulators, and gelling agent ===
Culture media compositions vary significantly in their mineral elements and vitamin content to accommodate diverse plant species requirements. Murashige and Skoog (MS) medium is distinguished by its high nitrogen content in ammonium form, a characteristic not found in other formulations. Sucrose typically serves as the primary carbohydrate source across various media types.

The interaction between auxins and cytokinins in regulating organogenesis is well-established, though responses vary by species. Some plants, such as tobacco, can spontaneously form shoot buds without exogenous growth regulators, while others like Scurrula pulverulenta, Lactuca sativa, and Brassica juncea strictly require hormonal supplementation. In B. juncea cotyledon cultures, benzylaminopurine (BAP) alone induces shoot formation from petiole tissue, similar to radiata pine where cytokinin alone suffices for shoot induction.

Research indicates that endogenous hormone concentrations, rather than exogenous application levels, ultimately determine organogenic differentiation. Among the various cytokinins (2iP, BAP, thidiazuron, kinetin, and zeatin) used for shoot induction, BAP has demonstrated superior efficacy and widespread application. Auxins similarly influence organogenic pathways, with 2,4-D commonly used for callus induction in cereals, though organogenesis typically requires transfer to media containing IAA or NAA or lacking 2,4-D entirely. The auxin-to-cytokinin ratio largely determines which organs develop.

Gibberellic acid (GA3) contributes to cell elongation and meristemoid formation, while unconventional compounds like tri-iodobenzoic acid (TIBA), abscisic acid (ABA), kanamycin, and auxin inhibitors have proven effective for recalcitrant species. Natural additives like ginseng powder can enhance regeneration frequency in certain cultures. Since ethylene typically suppresses shoot differentiation, inhibitors of ethylene synthesis such as aminoethoxyvinylglycine (AVG) and silver nitrate (AgNO_{3}) are often employed to promote organogenesis, with documented success in wheat, tobacco, and sunflower cultures.

Agar is not an essential component of the culture medium, but quality and quantity of agar is an important factor that may determine a role in organogenesis. Commercially available agar may contain impurities. With a high concentration of agar, the nutrient medium becomes hard and does not allow the diffusion of nutrients to the growing tissue. It influences the organogenesis process by producing adventitious roots, unwanted callus at the base, or senescence of the foliage. The pH is another important factor that may affect organogenesis route. The pH of the culture medium is adjusted to between 5.6 and 5.8 before sterilization. Medium pH facilitates or inhibits nutrient availability in the medium; for example, ammonium uptake in vitro occurs at a stable pH of 5.5 (Thorpe et al., 2008).

=== Other factors ===
==== Season of the year ====
The timing of explant collection significantly impacts regenerative capacity in tissue culture systems, with seasonal variations playing a crucial role in organ formation success. This phenomenon is clearly demonstrated in Lilium speciosum, where bulb scales exhibit differential regenerative responses based on collection season. Explants harvested during spring and autumn periods readily form bulblets in vitro, while those collected during summer or winter months fail to produce bulblets despite identical culture conditions.

Similar seasonal dependency is observed in Chlorophytum borivillianum, a medicinally valuable species that shows markedly enhanced in vitro tuber formation during monsoon seasons compared to other times of year. This seasonal variation in morphogenic potential likely reflects differences in the physiological state of the source plant, including endogenous hormone levels, carbohydrate reserves, and metabolic activity that fluctuate throughout the annual growth cycle.

==== Oxygen gradient ====
Oxygen has a key role in tissue culture, which influences the organ formation. In some cultures, shoot bud formation takes place when the gradient of available oxygen inside the culture vessel is reduced, while induction of roots requires a high oxygen gradient.

==== Light ====
Light conditions, including both intensity and spectral quality, function as significant morphogenic signals in plant tissue culture systems. Spectral composition research has revealed distinct wavelength-dependent responses, with blue light generally promoting shoot organogenesis while red light wavelengths typically favor root induction. Sequential photoperiod exposure—blue light followed by red light—has been documented to effectively stimulate specific organogenetic pathways in certain species.

The regulatory effect of different wavelengths demonstrates how light quality can selectively control morphogenic outcomes. Artificial fluorescent lighting produces variable responses depending on the species, promoting root formation in some cultures while inhibiting it in others. Some species exhibit specialized light requirements, as observed in Pisum sativum (garden pea), where shoot bud initiation occurs optimally in darkness before exposure to light stimulates further development.

For most tissue culture applications, standard lighting protocols typically recommend illumination of approximately 2,000-3,000 lux intensity with a 16-hour photoperiod. However, certain species demonstrate exceptional light intensity requirements, exemplified by Nicotiana tabacum (tobacco) callus cultures, which require substantially higher light intensities of 10,000-15,000 lux to induce shoot bud formation or somatic embryogenesis.

==== Temperature ====
Temperature serves as a critical environmental factor in plant tissue culture systems, with optimal incubation temperatures varying significantly among species based on their natural habitat requirements. While 25 °C represents the standard incubation temperature suitable for many plant species in vitro, species-specific temperature adaptations should be considered to maximize organogenic potential.

Geophytic species from temperate regions typically require lower temperature regimes than the standard protocol. Notable examples include bulbous plants such as Galanthus (snowdrop) which exhibits optimal growth at approximately 15 °C, while certain cultivars of Narcissus (daffodil) and Allium (ornamental onion) demonstrate enhanced regeneration efficiency at around 18 °C.

Conversely, species of tropical origin generally require elevated temperatures for optimal growth and organogenesis in culture. Date palm cultures thrive at 27 °C, while Monstera deliciosa (Swiss cheese plant) exhibits peak regenerative performance at 30 °C. These temperature requirements reflect evolutionary adaptations to the plants' native environmental conditions.

==== Ploidy level ====
Variation in chromosome number, that is, aneuploidy, polyploidy, etc., in plant cell culture has been well documented in the past. Chromosome instability of the cells results in gradual decline of morphogenetic potentiality of the callus tissue. Therefore, to maintain organogenic potential of the callus tissue and the chromosome stability, it is suggested that the time and frequency of subculture should be regularly followed.

==== Age of culture ====
Age of culture is often the key to successful organogenesis. A young culture/freshly subcultured material may produce organs more frequently than the aged ones. The probable reason for this is the reduction or loss of the organogenic potential in old cultures. However, in some plants, the plant regeneration capacity may retain indefinitely for many years

== Developmental process ==
=== Dedifferentiation ===
The ability of cells to undergo organogenesis largely depends on the application of plant growth regulators (PGRs), which influence the developmental direction of the tissue. The balance between auxins and cytokinins plays a critical role in determining whether shoots or roots will form. A lower auxin-to-cytokinin ratio favors shoot regeneration, whereas a higher auxin concentration promotes root formation. For example, in Medicago sativa (alfalfa) cultures, an elevated level of kinetin combined with a low concentration of 2,4-D (a synthetic auxin) leads to shoot development, whereas increasing 2,4-D while reducing kinetin concentration encourages root formation. However, successful organogenesis is not solely dependent on PGR treatment. The callus or developing tissue must reach a critical size before organ formation can proceed, reflecting the role of intercellular signaling in coordinating development.

=== Induction ===
The induction phase in organogenesis represents the transition period between a tissue achieving competence and becoming fully determined to initiate primordia formation. During this stage, an integrated genetic pathway directs the developmental process before morphological differentiation occurs. Chemical and physical factors can interfere with genetically programmed developmental pathways and alter morphogenic outcomes. In Convolvulus arvensis, such influences inhibited shoot formation and led instead to callus development.

The conclusion of the induction phase is marked by a cell or group of cells committing to either shoot or root formation. This determination is tested by transferring the tissue from a growth regulator-supplemented medium to a basal medium containing essential minerals, vitamins, and a carbon source but no plant growth regulators. At this stage, the tissue completes the induction process and becomes fully determined to its developmental fate.

A key concept in this process is canalisation, which refers to the ability of a developmental pathway to produce a consistent phenotype despite genetic or environmental variation. If explants are removed from shoot-inducing medium before canalisation completes, shoot formation drops sharply and root development dominates. This reflects the morphogenic plasticity of plant tissues in vitro.

=== Differentiation ===
Morphological differentiation begins in this phase, leading to formation of the nascent organ. Organogenesis initiation is marked by a shift in cellular polarity, followed by establishment of radial symmetry and growth along the newly defined axis, producing the structural bulge that signals organ initiation.

The sequential development of organogenesis can be observed in species such as Pinus oocarpa Schiede, where shoot buds are regenerated directly from cotyledons through direct organogenesis. However, the specific developmental patterns may vary across different plant species grown in vitro. The progression of organ formation includes distinct morphological changes, beginning with alterations in surface texture, the emergence of meristemoids, and the expansion of the meristematic region either vertically or horizontally. This is followed by the protrusion of the meristematic region beyond the epidermal layer, the formation of a structured meristem with visible leaf primordia, and eventually, the full development of an adventitious bud.

A notable characteristic of in vitro organogenic cultures is the simultaneous formation of multiple meristemoids on a single explant, with varying degrees of differentiation. Within the same explant, buds may exist in different developmental stages, ranging from early initiation to fully developed structures. Once shoots exceed about 1 cm in length, they are transferred to in vitro or ex vitro rooting substrates to complete plantlet regeneration.

== Advantages and limitations ==
In direct organogenesis, axillary shoots arise directly from pre-existing meristems at shoot tips and nodes, giving a high multiplication rate. Because organised shoot meristems rarely accumulate mutations, the resulting plants are genetically uniform and true-to-type - i.e. genetic clones of the parent. This makes the technique particularly useful for propagation and conservation of economically and environmentally important species.

However, there are some limitations to organogenesis. Somaclonal variation, which can result in unwanted genetic diversity, is a potential issue, particularly in the indirect organogenesis process. Additionally, this technique may not be suitable for recalcitrant plant species, which are those that do not respond well to in vitro culture or regeneration protocols. These limitations highlight the need for ongoing research and optimization of methods for different plant species to overcome these challenges in plant propagation and conservation.

=== Cell elongation ===
In addition to growth by cell division, a plant may grow through cell elongation. This occurs when individual cells or groups of cells grow longer. Not all plant cells grow to the same length. When cells on one side of a stem grow longer and faster than cells on the other side, the stem bends to the side of the slower growing cells as a result. This directional growth can occur via a plant's response to a particular stimulus, such as light (phototropism), gravity (gravitropism), water, (hydrotropism), and physical contact (thigmotropism).

This is a diagram of cell elongation in a plant. In sum, the acidity within the cell wall as a result of a high proton concentration in the cell wall. As a result, the cell wall becomes more flexible so that when water comes into the plant vacuole, the plant cell will elongate.

This image shows the development of a normal plant. It resembles the different growth processes for a leaf, a stem, etc. On top of the gradual growth of the plant, the image reveals the true meaning of phototropism and cell elongation, meaning the light energy from the sun is causing the growing plant to bend towards the light aka elongate.

Plant growth and development are mediated by specific plant hormones and plant growth regulators (PGRs) (Ross et al. 1983). Endogenous hormone levels are influenced by plant age, cold hardiness, dormancy, and other metabolic conditions; photoperiod, moisture, temperature, and other external environmental conditions; and exogenous sources of PGRs, e.g., externally applied and of rhizospheric origin.

=== Morphological variation during growth ===
Plants exhibit natural variation in their form and structure. While all organisms vary from individual to individual, plants exhibit an additional type of variation. Within a single individual, parts are repeated which may differ in form and structure from other similar parts. This variation is most easily seen in the leaves of a plant, though other organs such as stems and flowers may show similar variation. There are three primary causes of this variation: positional effects, environmental effects, and juvenility.

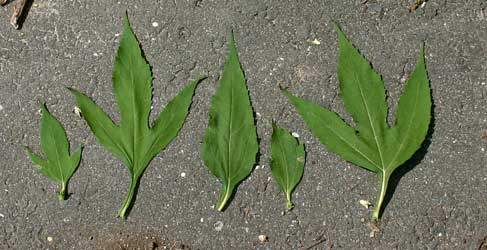
Variation in leaves from the giant ragweed illustrating positional effects. The lobed leaves come from the base of the plant, while the unlobed leaves come from the top of the plant.

There is variation among the parts of a mature plant resulting from the relative position where the organ is produced. For example, along a new branch the leaves may vary in a consistent pattern along the branch. The form of leaves produced near the base of the branch differs from leaves produced at the tip of the plant, and this difference is consistent from branch to branch on a given plant and in a given species.

The way in which new structures mature as they are produced may be affected by the point in the plants life when they begin to develop, as well as by the environment to which the structures are exposed. Temperature has a multiplicity of effects on plants depending on a variety of factors, including the size and condition of the plant and the temperature and duration of exposure. The smaller and more succulent the plant, the greater the susceptibility to damage or death from temperatures that are too high or too low. Temperature affects the rate of biochemical and physiological processes, rates generally (within limits) increasing with temperature.

Juvenility or heteroblasty is when the organs and tissues produced by a young plant, such as a seedling, are often different from those that are produced by the same plant when it is older. For example, young trees will produce longer, leaner branches that grow upwards more than the branches they will produce as a fully grown tree. In addition, leaves produced during early growth tend to be larger, thinner, and more irregular than leaves on the adult plant. Specimens of juvenile plants may look so completely different from adult plants of the same species that egg-laying insects do not recognize the plant as food for their young. The transition from early to late growth forms is sometimes called vegetative phase change.

=== Adventitious structures ===
Plant structures, including, roots, buds, and shoots, that develop in unusual locations are called adventitious.

Adventitious roots and buds usually develop near the existing vascular tissues so that they can connect to the xylem and phloem. However, the exact location varies greatly. In young stems, adventitious roots often form from parenchyma between the vascular bundles. In stems with secondary growth, adventitious roots often originate in phloem parenchyma near the vascular cambium. In stem cuttings, adventitious roots sometimes also originate in the callus cells that form at the cut surface. Leaf cuttings of the Crassula form adventitious roots in the epidermis.

==== Buds and shoots ====
Adventitious buds develop from places other than a shoot apical meristem, which occurs at the tip of a stem, or on a shoot node, at the leaf axil, the bud being left there during primary growth. They may develop on roots or leaves, or on shoots as a new growth. Shoot apical meristems produce one or more axillary or lateral buds at each node. When stems produce considerable secondary growth, the axillary buds may be destroyed. Adventitious buds may then develop on stems with secondary growth.

Adventitious buds are often formed after the stem is wounded or pruned. The adventitious buds help to replace lost branches. Adventitious buds and shoots also may develop on mature tree trunks when a shaded trunk is exposed to bright sunlight because surrounding trees are cut down. Redwood (Sequoia sempervirens) trees often develop many adventitious buds on their lower trunks. If the main trunk dies, a new one often sprouts from one of the adventitious buds. Small pieces of redwood trunk are sold as souvenirs termed redwood burls. They are placed in a pan of water, and the adventitious buds sprout to form shoots.

Some plants normally develop adventitious buds on their roots, which can extend quite a distance from the plant. Shoots that develop from adventitious buds on roots are termed suckers. They are a type of natural vegetative reproduction in many species, e.g. many grasses, quaking aspen and Canada thistle. The Pando quaking aspen grew from one trunk to 47,000 trunks via adventitious bud formation on a single root system.

Some leaves develop adventitious buds, which then form adventitious roots, as part of vegetative reproduction; e.g. piggyback plant (Tolmiea menziesii) and mother-of-thousands (Kalanchoe daigremontiana). The adventitious plantlets then drop off the parent plant and develop as separate clones of the parent.

Coppicing is the practice of cutting tree stems to the ground to promote rapid growth of adventitious shoots. It is traditionally used to produce poles, fence material or firewood. It is also practiced for biomass crops grown for fuel, such as poplar or willow.

==== Roots ====
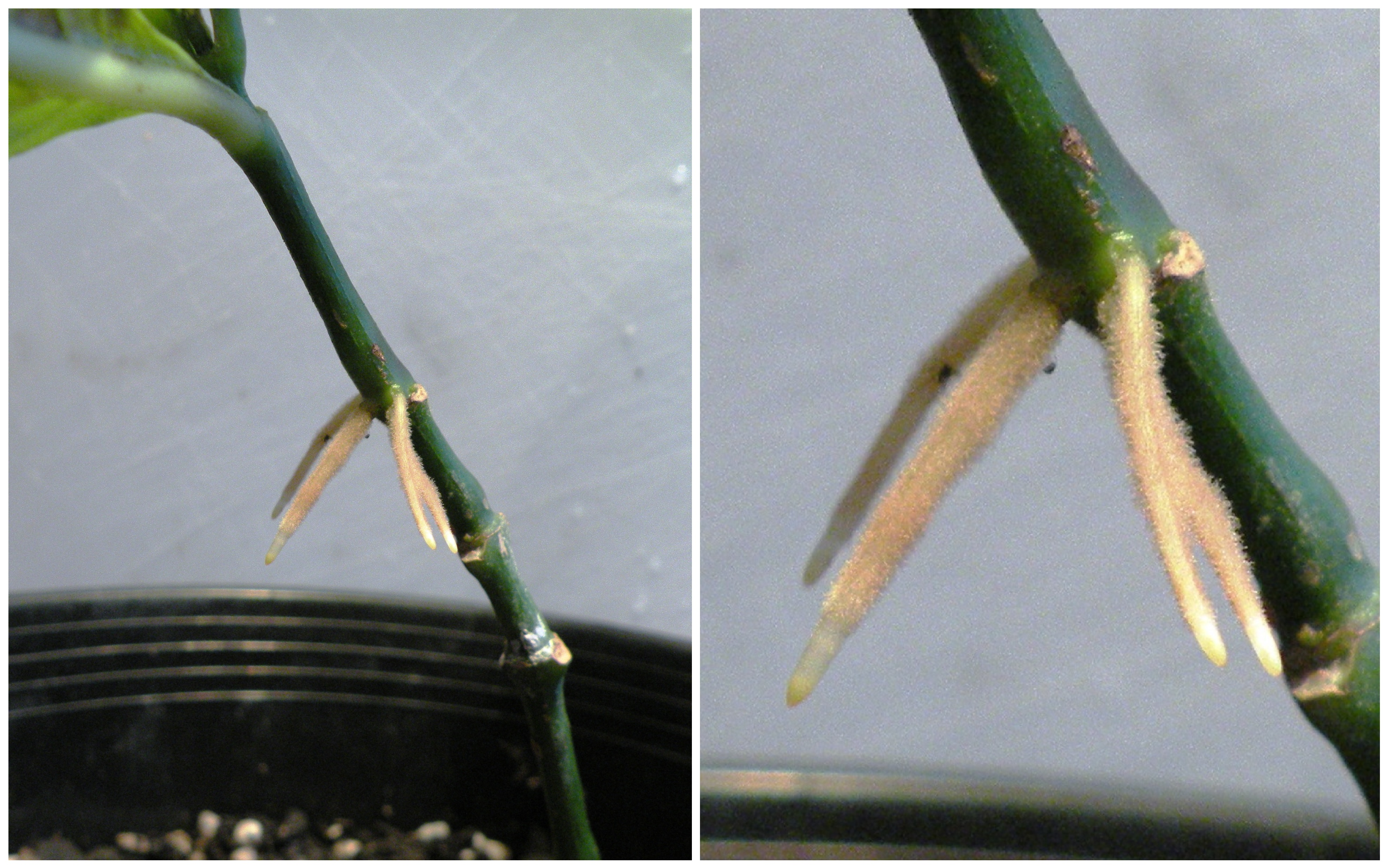
Roots forming above ground on a cutting of Odontonema, also known as firespike

Adventitious rooting may be a stress-avoidance acclimation for some species, driven by such inputs as hypoxia or nutrient deficiency. Another ecologically important function of adventitious rooting is the vegetative reproduction of tree species such as Salix and Sequoia in riparian settings.

The ability of plant stems to form adventitious roots is utilised in commercial propagation by cuttings. Understanding of the physiological mechanisms behind adventitious rooting has allowed some progress to be made in improving the rooting of cuttings by the application of synthetic auxins as rooting powders and by the use of selective basal wounding. Further progress can be made in future years by applying research into other regulatory mechanisms to commercial propagation and by the comparative analysis of molecular and ecophysiological control of adventitious rooting in 'hard to root' vs. 'easy to root' species.

Adventitious roots and buds are very important when people propagate plants via cuttings, layering, tissue culture. Plant hormones, termed auxins, are often applied to stem, shoot or leaf cuttings to promote adventitious root formation, e.g., African violet and sedum leaves and shoots of poinsettia and coleus. Propagation via root cuttings requires adventitious bud formation, e.g., in horseradish and apple. In layering, adventitious roots are formed on aerial stems before the stem section is removed to make a new plant. Large houseplants are often propagated by air layering. Adventitious roots and buds must develop in tissue culture propagation of plants.

===== Modified forms =====
- Tuberous roots lack a definite shape; example: sweet potato.
- Fasciculated root (tuberous root) occur in clusters at the base of the stem; examples: asparagus, dahlia.
- Nodulose roots become swollen near the tips; example: turmeric.
- Brace roots arise from the first few nodes of the stem. These penetrate obliquely down into the soil and give support to the plant; examples: maize, sugarcane.
- Prop roots give mechanical support to aerial branches. The lateral branches grow vertically downward into the soil and act as pillars; example: banyan.
- Climbing roots arising from nodes attach themselves to some support and climb over it; example: Epipremnum aureum.
- Moniliform or beaded roots the fleshy roots give a beaded appearance, e.g.: bitter gourd, Portulaca.

== Leaf development ==
The genetics behind leaf shape development in Arabidopsis thaliana has been broken down into three stages: The initiation of the leaf primordium, the establishment of dorsiventrality, and the development of a marginal meristem. Leaf primordium is initiated by the suppression of the genes and proteins of the class I KNOX family (such as SHOOT APICAL MERISTEMLESS). These class I KNOX proteins directly suppress gibberellin biosynthesis in the leaf primodium. Many genetic factors were found to be involved in the suppression of these genes in leaf primordia (such as ASYMMETRIC LEAVES1, BLADE-ON-PETIOLE1, SAWTOOTH1, etc.). Thus, with this suppression, the levels of gibberellin increase and leaf primorium initiates growth.

== Flower development ==
Anatomy of the flower

Flower development is the process by which angiosperms produce a pattern of gene expression in meristems that leads to the appearance of an organ oriented towards sexual reproduction, the flower. There are three physiological developments that must occur in order for this to take place: firstly, the plant must pass from sexual immaturity into a sexually mature state (i.e. a transition towards flowering); secondly, the transformation of the apical meristem's function from a vegetative meristem into a floral meristem or inflorescence; and finally the growth of the flower's individual organs. The latter phase has been modelled using the ABC model, which describes the biological basis of the process from the perspective of molecular and developmental genetics.

A diagram illustrating flower development in Arabidopsis

An external stimulus is required in order to trigger the differentiation of the meristem into a flower meristem. This stimulus will activate mitotic cell division in the meristem, particularly on its sides where new primordia are formed. This same stimulus will also cause the meristem to follow a developmental pattern that will lead to the growth of floral meristems as opposed to vegetative meristems. The main difference between these two types of meristem, apart from the obvious disparity between the objective organ, is the verticillate (or whorled) phyllotaxis, that is, the absence of stem elongation among the successive whorls or verticils of the primordium. These verticils follow an acropetal development, giving rise to sepals, petals, stamens and carpels. Another difference from vegetative axillary meristems is that the floral meristem is «determined», which means that, once differentiated, its cells will no longer divide.

The identity of the organs present in the four floral verticils is a consequence of the interaction of at least three types of gene products, each with distinct functions. According to the ABC model, functions A and C are required in order to determine the identity of the verticils of the perianth and the reproductive verticils, respectively. These functions are exclusive and the absence of one of them means that the other will determine the identity of all the floral verticils. The B function allows the differentiation of petals from sepals in the secondary verticil, as well as the differentiation of the stamen from the carpel on the tertiary verticil.

=== Floral fragrance ===
Plants use floral form, flower, and scent to attract different insects for pollination. Certain compounds within the emitted scent appeal to particular pollinators. In Petunia hybrida, volatile benzenoids are produced to give off the floral smell. While components of the benzenoid biosynthetic pathway are known, the enzymes within the pathway, and subsequent regulation of those enzymes, are yet to be discovered.

To determine pathway regulation in 2006, P. hybrida Mitchell flowers were used in a petal-specific microarray to compare the flowers that were just about to produce the scent, to the P. hybrida cultivar W138 flowers that produce few volatile benzenoids. cDNAs of genes of both plants were sequenced. The results demonstrated that there is a transcription factor upregulated in the Mitchell flowers, but not in the W138 flowers lacking the floral aroma. This gene was named ODORANT1 (ODO1). To determine expression of ODO1 throughout the day, RNA gel blot analysis was done. The gel showed that ODO1 transcript levels began increasing between 1300 and 1600 h, peaked at 2200 h and were lowest at 1000 h. These ODO1 transcript levels directly correspond to the timeline of volatile benzenoid emission. Additionally, the gel supported the previous finding that W138 non-fragrant flowers have only one-tenth the ODO1 transcript levels of the Mitchell flowers. Thus, the amount of ODO1 made corresponds to the amount of volatile benzenoid emitted, indicating that ODO1 regulates benzenoid biosynthesis.

Additional genes contributing to the biosynthesis of major scent compounds are OOMT1 and OOMT2. OOMT1 and OOMT2 help to synthesize orcinol O-methyltransferases (OOMT), which catalyze the last two steps of the DMT pathway, creating 3,5-dimethoxytoluene (DMT). DMT is a scent compound produced by many different roses yet, some rose varieties, like Rosa gallica and Damask rose Rosa damascene, do not emit DMT. It has been suggested that these varieties do not make DMT because they do not have the OOMT genes. However, following an immunolocalization experiment, OOMT was found in the petal epidermis. To study this further, rose petals were subjected to ultracentrifugation. Supernatants and pellets were inspected by western blot. Detection of OOMT protein at 150,000g in the supernatant and the pellet allowed for researchers to conclude that OOMT protein is tightly associated with petal epidermis membranes. Such experiments determined that OOMT genes do exist within Rosa gallica and Damask rose Rosa damascene varieties, but the OOMT genes are not expressed in the flower tissues where DMT is made.
