= DNA Plant Technology =

DNA Plant Technology Corporation
- Type: Public
- Traded as: Nasdaq: DNAP
- Industry: Biotechnology
- Founded: 1981
- Defunct: 2002

DNA Plant Technology was an early pioneer in applying transgenic biotechnology to problems in agriculture. The company was founded in Cinnaminson Township, New Jersey, and moved to California in 1994. Some of the plants and products they developed included vine sweet mini peppers, the Fish tomato and Y1 tobacco. In 1996 the company merged with the Mexican conglomerate Empresas La Moderna, through its Bionovo subsidiary. In 2002, Bionova shut down DNA Plant Technology.

== History ==
DNA Plant Technology was founded in 1981 by Dr. William R. Sharp and Dr. David A. Evans, in Cinnaminson, New Jersey, "to develop tastier, value-added plant-based products for industrial and consumer markets" using "advanced plant-breeding techniques, tissue-culture methods and molecular biology in developing premium food products and improving agricultural raw materials." By 1986, the company had gone public (NASDAQ:DNAP), and had partnerships with American Home Foods, Campbell Soup, Firmenich (a fragrance and flavor company), General Foods, Koppers Company, Hershey Foods, Brown and Williamson Tobacco, United Fruit, and others.

By 1992 the company was investing heavily in genetic engineering and had invented, and obtained an issued patent for, the fish antifreeze gene that would become part of the infamous Fish tomato.

In 1993, DNAP purchased the Freshworld premium fruit and vegetable brand from Du Pont for a mixture of shares, cash and intellectual rights valued at over $30 million.

In 1994, their headquarters moved to Oakland, California.

In 1996, the company was out of cash, and agreed to a merger with Empresas La Moderna, S.A. de C.V. (NYSE/ADR:ELM) (“ELM”) through ELM's subsidiary, Bionova, which also controlled the seed company, Seminis. The company became a wholly owned subsidiary of DNAP Holding Corporation (NASDAQ: DNAPD) of which it retained a 30% equity stake. ELM and Bionova were controlled by Alfonso Romo Garza. ELM was a company based in Monterrey, Mexico that operated in three fields: cigarettes (where it held 53% of the Mexican market), vegetable seeds, and packaging.

In 1999 DNAP Holding Corporation changed its name to Bionova Holding Corporation and changed its NASDAQ ticker to BNVA.

In 2002 Bionova closed down its R&D operations, which had been carried out through its DNA Plant Technology subsidiary.

== Major works ==
=== Fish tomato ===
In 1991, DNA Plant Technology applied for and were granted permission to conduct a field test permit for their transgenic fish tomato product (tomato; antifreeze gene; staphylococcal Protein A) from the USDA's Animal and Plant Health Inspection Service. This product remains controversial in the history of biotechnology, because an antifreeze gene isolated from an arctic flounder was transgenically inserted into a tomato in an attempt to create a frost-tolerant tomato. Although this product was tested in a greenhouse, and may have been tested in the field, it was never commercialized.

In 1995, DNA Plant Technology unveiled a second generation of a different transgenic tomato and served it at a meeting of its shareholders. That same year, DNA Plant Technology sold its wholly owned subsidiary, Frost Technology Corporation, to Simplot.

=== Tobacco ===
Via its collaboration with the cigarette company, Brown & Williamson, DNA Plant Technology developed a genetically engineered cultivar of tobacco with a higher nicotine content, based on a high-nicotine strain already owned by Brown & Williamson called Y-1. Brown & Williamson and DNA Plant Technology were indicted by the US government for exporting the seeds to Brazil in violation of the Tobacco Seed Export law.

=== Popcorn ===
In the mid-1980s, DNAP attempted to use somaclonal variation with corn to produce buttery-tasting popcorn without the need to add butter.

=== Discovery of gene silencing ===
While working for DNA Plant Technology, the scientists Richard A. Jorgensen and Carolyn Napoli made discoveries about post transcriptional gene silencing that went on to form the basis of a number of U.S. patents on gene regulation and crop manipulation. Key experiments in the control of plant transgene expression were performed by Jorgensen after he joined DNA Plant Technology corporation / Advanced Genetic Sciences, Inc., including the modification of flower color in ornamental plants. This research led to the discovery of gene silencing when an extra copy of a key gene yielded white rather than blue flowers.

== Legal controversy ==
In the 1990s, the FDA targeted DNA Plant Technology, charging that it had illegally smuggled Y1 Tobacco seeds out of the United States. The U.S. Justice Department charged DNA Plant Technology with one misdemeanor count of conspiracy to violate the Tobacco Seed Export law, prohibiting the export of tobacco seeds without a permit (a law which was repealed in 1991). DNA Plant Technology pleaded guilty in 1998 and agreed to cooperate with further investigations of Brown & Williamson. However, the U.S. Supreme Court eventually ruled in March 2000 that the FDA did not have the authority to regulate tobacco as a drug.
