= DNAP =

DNAP may refer to:

- DNA polymerase, a class of enzymes
- DnaP, a bacterial DNA replication enzyme
- Doctor of Nurse Anesthesia Practice, an academic degree
- Dyno Nobel Asia Pacific, a subsidiary of Dyno Nobel
- DNA Plant Technology (stock exchange abbreviation: DNAP), an American company
- Deutschnational Arbeiterband, one of the a Weimar political parties
