= Camponotus reburrus =

Scientific classification
- Domain: Eukaryota
- Kingdom: Animalia
- Phylum: Arthropoda
- Class: Insecta
- Order: Hymenoptera
- Family: Formicidae
- Subfamily: Formicinae
- Genus: Camponotus
- Species: C. reburrus

Binomial name
- Camponotus reburrus Mackay, in Mackay & Barriga, 2012

Species of carpenter ant

Camponotus reburrus (from Latin, reburrus, meaning one with bristling hair, referring to the hairs on the head) is a species of carpenter ants in the subfamily Formicinae. It is known only from northeastern Ecuador. C. reburrus apparently has an obligatory relationship with the ant plants Cecropia membranacea, Cecropia herthae and Cecropia marginalis. The workers are relatively small and hairy, it does not appear to have major workers. It is similar to Camponotus balzani which also lives in Cecropia spp. (but has normal major workers).

== Description ==
The minor worker of C. reburrus is a relatively small (4.4–6.6 mm total length) yellowish brown specimen, with a transversely striped yellow and brown gaster, or at least with yellow lateral splotches. The sides of the head are straight and parallel, and the carina on the clypeus is well marked. The antennal scape has numerous erect hairs along the shaft, the hairs on the tibiae are coarse and suberect. Most surfaces are moderately to strongly shining. The major worker apparently does not exist.

The female of C. reburrus is a small (total length 6–7 mm) hairy specimen, which is shiny dark brown with lighter colored legs. The gaster has lateral yellow splotches. The sides of the head are straight and parallel. The size and abundant erect hairs on the head and scape should separate it from all others in the subgenus Tanaemyrmex.

The male of C. reburrus is a small (total length 4.0–5.5 mm) dark brown to yellowish brown specimen, with abundant hairs on most surfaces. Other than color and hairiness, it does not seem to possess characteristics which would distinguish it from other small males of Camponotus.

== Related carpenter ants ==
Camponotus reburrus is closely related to C. balzani, but does not appear to be closely related to any of the other described species in the subgenus Tanaemyrmex. This relationship with C. balzani was further supported with DNA barcode analyses. The minor workers can be separated in that the side of the head has few erect or suberect hairs (abundant in minors of C. balzani), the gaster is transversely striped with yellow bands (generally concolorous light brown in C. balzani, sometimes with a hint of tan transverse stripes), and the workers are slightly smaller (much overlap in size ranges in the two species). The females of C. reburrus are much smaller (maximum total length approaches 7 mm) than those of C. balzani (total length over 1 cm). The splotches or stripes on the gaster are definitely yellow in females of C. reburrus but are only pale brown (if present) on the gaster of females of C. balzani. The males of C. reburrus are also much smaller (total length approaching 4.7 mm) as compared to the males of C. balzani (total length greater than 5 mm). The males of C. reburrus are generally darker brown than the pale medium brown males of C. balzani. If major workers are found to exist, they will probably be similar to those of C. balzani with the sides of the head narrowed anteriorly, with a well-developed clypeal carina, but differing in having few erect hairs on the sides of the head. The gaster would be expected to have well-developed yellow splotches or bands, which would differ from the major of C. balzani in which the bands on the gaster are only pale brown, if present.

== Biology ==
Three of the winged female-type specimens of C. reburrus were collected in a Malaise trap. Others were collected in Cecropia at the edge of secondary growth rainforest or in gaps inside primary growth rainforest. Among the Cecropia species where this species was found are: C. marginalis, C. herthae, and C. membranacea. The ants were found inside Cecropia internodes and were not aggressive as are Azteca ants. Müllerian bodies and scale insects were found in the internodes where the ant species were living. This species is smaller than C. balzani, but the behavior inside Cecropia nodes is similar: the ants of both species do not attack but run and escape. Camponotus balzani and C. reburrus inhabit Cecropia juvenile and reproductive plants (plants with pistillate or staminate flowers), but most Cecropia species were found more commonly with aggressive colonies of Azteca ants.
