= Penicillium menonorum =

Scientific classification
- Kingdom: Fungi
- Division: Ascomycota
- Class: Eurotiomycetes
- Order: Eurotiales
- Family: Aspergillaceae
- Genus: Penicillium
- Species: P. menonorum

Binomial name
- Penicillium menonorum S.W. Peterson 2011

Type strain
- NRRL 50410

Species of fungus

Penicillium menonorum is a monoverticillate, non-vesiculate species of the genus Penicillium which was isolated from rhizosphere soil in Korea. Penicillium menonorum can promote plant growth and improve soil fertility
