= Brace roots =

Plant root which grows aboveground primarily for anchorage

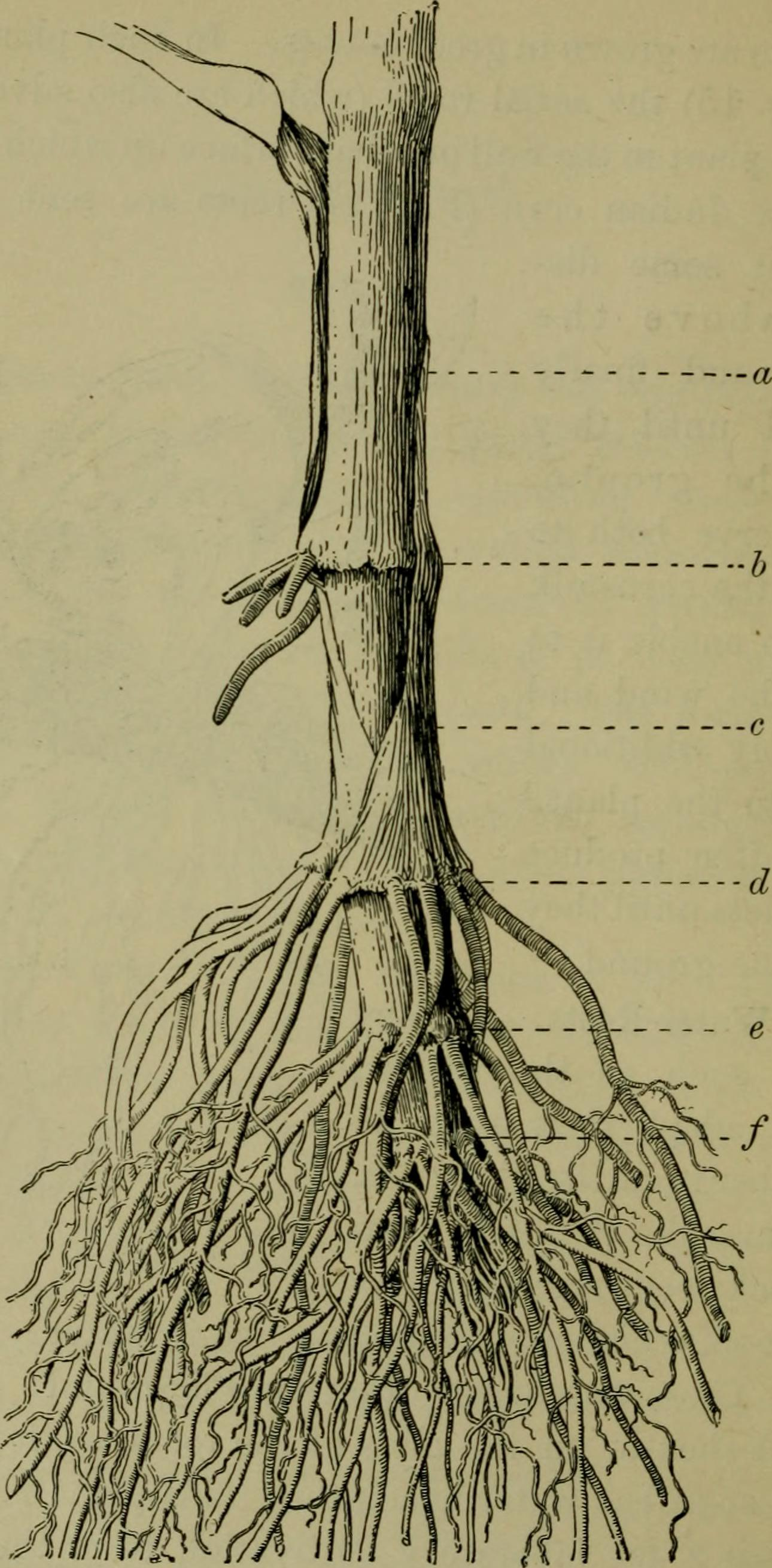
Illustration displaying ordinary and aerial anatomy of Zea mays

In botany, brace roots (roots developing from aerial stem nodes) are a type of adventitious root that develop from aboveground stem nodes in many monocots. Anchorage, water and nutrient acquisition are the most important functions of roots. Thus, plants develop roots that maximize these functions for productivity and survival. In cereals such as maize, brace roots are one of the roots that contribute to these important functions. Brace roots develop constitutively in whorls from stem nodes, with the lowest whorl being the first to develop, enter the soil, branch out, and contribute the most to anchorage. Subsequent whorls may enter the soil and contribute to anchorage and resource acquisition, but they may also remain aerial. While these aerial roots do not contribute as much to anchorage, they could contribute in other ways such as forming an association with nitrogen-fixing bacteria.

Brace roots may remain aerial or penetrate the soil as they perform root functions such as anchorage and resource acquisition. Although brace root development in soil or aerial environments influences function, a lot is still unknown about how their anatomy, architecture and development contributes to their function. The physiology of brace roots is directly linked to their anatomy, architecture, and development. The dynamic interplay of internal regulators such as transcription factors, miRNAs, and phytohormones, lay the foundation for brace root development. Once brace roots emerge from stem nodes, the influence of external factors such as the availability of water, nutrients, light and humidity become prominent. Therefore, a combination of internal and external factors determine the overall organization, shape, and size of individual roots (root system architecture) and, as a result, root function.

== Overview ==
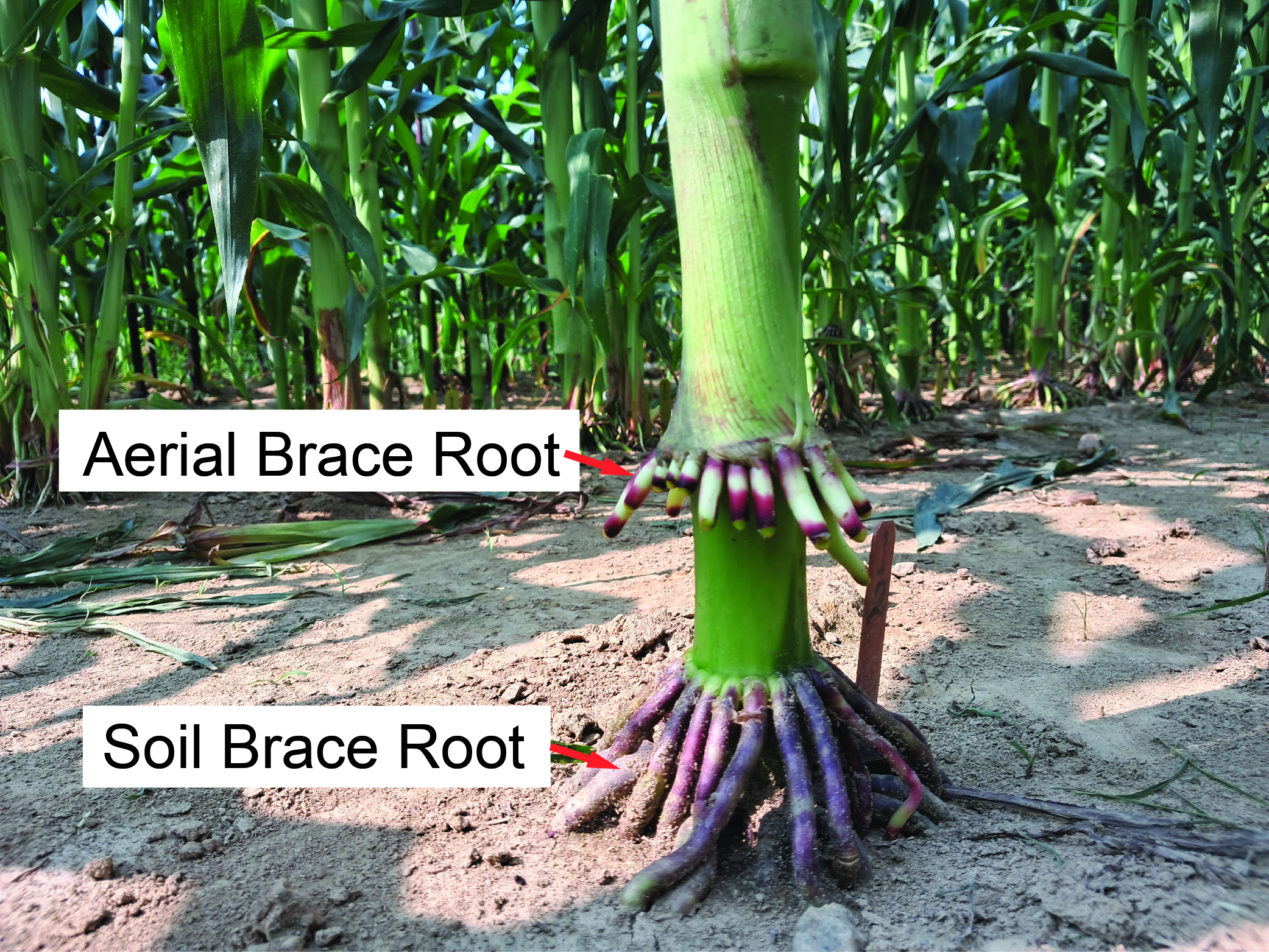
Two types of brace roots as shown in maize.

Roots may develop from the embryo (contained in a seed) or post-embryonically (after germination). In young plants, root functions such as anchorage and resource acquisition (finding and taking up water and nutrients) are carried out by embryonic roots. Embryonic roots include primary roots and in some plants, seminal roots. In eudicot species (plants that have their embryo enclosed in two seed leaves), older plants continue to rely on a primary tap root for root functions with contribution from post-embryonic lateral roots. In contrast, monocot root functions are mostly carried out by post-embryonic nodal roots. Nodal roots are adventitious roots (roots originating from non-root tissues) that develop from stem nodes below (called crown roots) or above (called brace roots) the soil. Although many adventitious roots develop in response to stress conditions such as flooding or wounding, some adventitious roots develop as a normal (i.e., constitutive) part of the plant life cycle. A specialized type of constitutive adventitious root that originates from aboveground nodes in monocots, such as maize, sorghum, setaria and sugar cane, is called a brace root.

The term "brace root" has been inconsistently used. In some contexts, the term is used for only aboveground nodal roots that remain aerial and could provide support after tipping. This notion dates back to the work of Martin and Hershey in 1935 and was further expounded by Hoppe et al. 1986. However, over time, the term has evolved to encompass all aboveground nodal roots or sometimes only those that enter the soil.

Brace roots develop starting from the lowest stem node (node closest to the soil), where multiple roots emerge arranged in a whorl around the stem. Depending on the plant and the environment, brace root whorls may develop from two, three, or more nodes up the stem. Due to the subsequent nature of brace root development, the brace root whorls that develop from higher stem nodes may remain aerial throughout the plant lifespan and are referred to as aerial brace roots while the brace root whorls closest to the ground penetrate the soil and are referred to as soil brace roots.

== Brace root anatomy ==
In maize, aerial brace roots, soil brace roots, and crown roots exhibit distinctive phenotypic traits. Anatomical differences start as early as the primordium (immature organ), where the shape of the root cap within primordia differs between belowground crown roots and aboveground brace roots. The crown root primordia has a conical root cap similar to the primary root, whereas the brace root primordia has a flattened root cap that extends further along the primordia length. As brace roots penetrate the soil, the root cap gradually resembles that of crown roots.

In general, the aerial portion of brace roots is different from the soil portion of brace roots, with the soil portion more closely resembling the crown roots. For example, the aerial segments of brace roots are green or purple in color and become colorless when the roots penetrate the soil. In addition, the aerial segments of brace roots have epidermis (outermost cell layer) that is reported to die; and a thickened hypodermis (layer of cell beneath the epidermis) and outer cortex (tissue layer located between the epidermis and the vascular tissues). When brace roots penetrate the soil, these phenotypes again become similar to crown roots. Thus, suggesting that the aerial versus soil environment plays an important role in shaping brace root anatomy.

Anatomical differences in brace roots have also been used to predict their function. For example, the number and size of differentiated late metaxylem vessels, which are utilized in water and nutrient transport, are much larger compared to those in the primary root. Indeed, brace roots from whorls high on the stem contain up to 41 times more metaxylem vessels than primary roots. Another anatomical feature that influences brace root resource acquisition is the presence of root cortical aerenchyma. Root cortical aerenchyma are enlarged air spaces in root cortices that enhance oxygen transport, which is essential to nutrient uptake during respiration. Although these air spaces do not occur in the aerial portion of brace roots, root cortical aerenchyma are observed in brace roots penetrating the soil.

== Brace root architecture and function ==
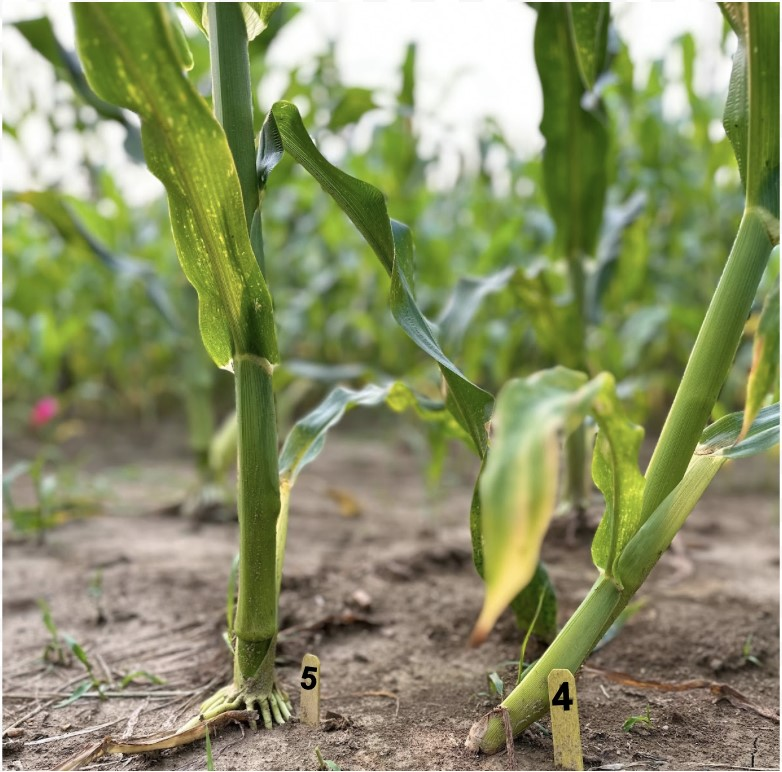
The maize plant with marker "5" (left) is anchored to the soil by brace roots whereas the maize plant with marker "4" (right) lacks brace roots and is lodged.

The function of roots is partially determined by organization, shape, and size of individual roots, which is collectively called root system architecture. However, this term generally considers only the roots within the soil. Brace roots have a unique architecture that expands beyond the soil-based definition of root system architecture to include aerial environments. These different environments impact the function of brace roots for anchorage, water, and nutrient acquisition.

Brace roots were historically named for their perceived role in anchorage. Anchorage failure (termed root lodging in agricultural contexts) hinders plant growth, development, and productivity. In Zea mays (maize or corn), soil brace roots limit root lodging by stabilizing the stem, with more brace root whorls in the soil and greater brace root density within whorls correlating with better anchorage. Each whorl, however, contributes differently to anchorage with the lowest whorl (closest to the soil) contributing the most and subsequent whorls contributing less. Soil brace roots may generate a branched architecture by developing lateral roots, which theoretically increases anchorage. The aerial brace roots do not directly contribute to anchorage, but typically prevent lodged plants from remaining on the ground.

The branched architecture of soil brace roots that is advantageous for anchorage also increases surface area, which in turn impacts the efficiency of water and nutrient acquisition. Aerial brace roots on the other hand, are rigid, unbranched, and covered by a gelatinous substance called mucilage, which prevents dehydration. According to a study on the ancient Sierra Mixe maize variety, this mucilage can also harbor nitrogen-fixing microbes that contribute to nitrogen acquisition. When considering modern maize lines, one study revealed that while mucilage secretion is common, only a few lines have retained nitrogen-fixing traits similar to that of ancient maize. Moreover, genetic mapping studies identified subtilin3 (SBT3) as a negative regulator of mucilage secretion in maize. Indeed, knockout of SBT3 in a low-mucilage producing line increased mucilage secretion without impacting the number of brace root whorls, the number of brace roots per whorl, or the diameter of the brace roots. Thus, highlighting the future of engineering mucilage production to facilitate association with nitrogen-fixing bacteria.

In addition to nitrogen acquisition, brace roots that enter the soil during tasseling (the stage at which maize plants develop the male reproductive structure called tassel) have been shown to take up phosphorus. It remains unknown if this is specific to the tasseling stage or if brace roots provide an important role in phosphorus acquisition at other stages as well.

Furthermore, characterization of root architectural traits within and among maize genotypes showed that node-position impacts the growth patterns and characteristics of nodal roots; with size-related traits (e.g., stem width, number of roots per whorl, and nodal root diameter) showing significant sensitivity to node position. In contrast, traits such as root growth angle showed little variation across whorls or genotypes. However, both the root growth angle and the number of roots per whorl are impacted by the availability of soil nitrogen, suggesting that root traits are not purely allometric (related to plant size) but also environmentally dependent.

There may be other ways brace root anatomy and architecture influence root function, including how and when these features develop, thus, a clear understanding of brace root development is required to fully grasp the function of these specialized roots. This understanding will prove vital in maximizing brace root function through selective breeding.

== Brace root development ==
Brace root development has been proposed to be a juvenile trait because brace root emergence is halted once the plant reaches maturity. As plants transition from juvenile to adult, the adult nodes favor development of reproductive structures like ears, over brace roots. The relationship between juvenile-to-adult transition and brace root development means that the two phenotypes are closely linked. This has made it difficult to separate genes directly involved in juvenile-to-adult transition from those involved in brace root development.

Signals that influence the development of brace roots are both internal and external. Internal signals include transcription factors, phytohormones, and small RNAs; external environmental signals include the availability of water, nutrients, light and humidity. Although environmental factors can influence the outcome of brace root development, it is, however, the internal genetic and cellular molecular regulation that determines the cell fate (in our context), to form brace roots.

=== Internal genetic and molecular regulation of brace root development ===
Brace root development can be summarized into four main stages based on anatomy and/or gene expression. These stages have been best defined in maize and are summarized below.

==== Stage 1: Induction ====
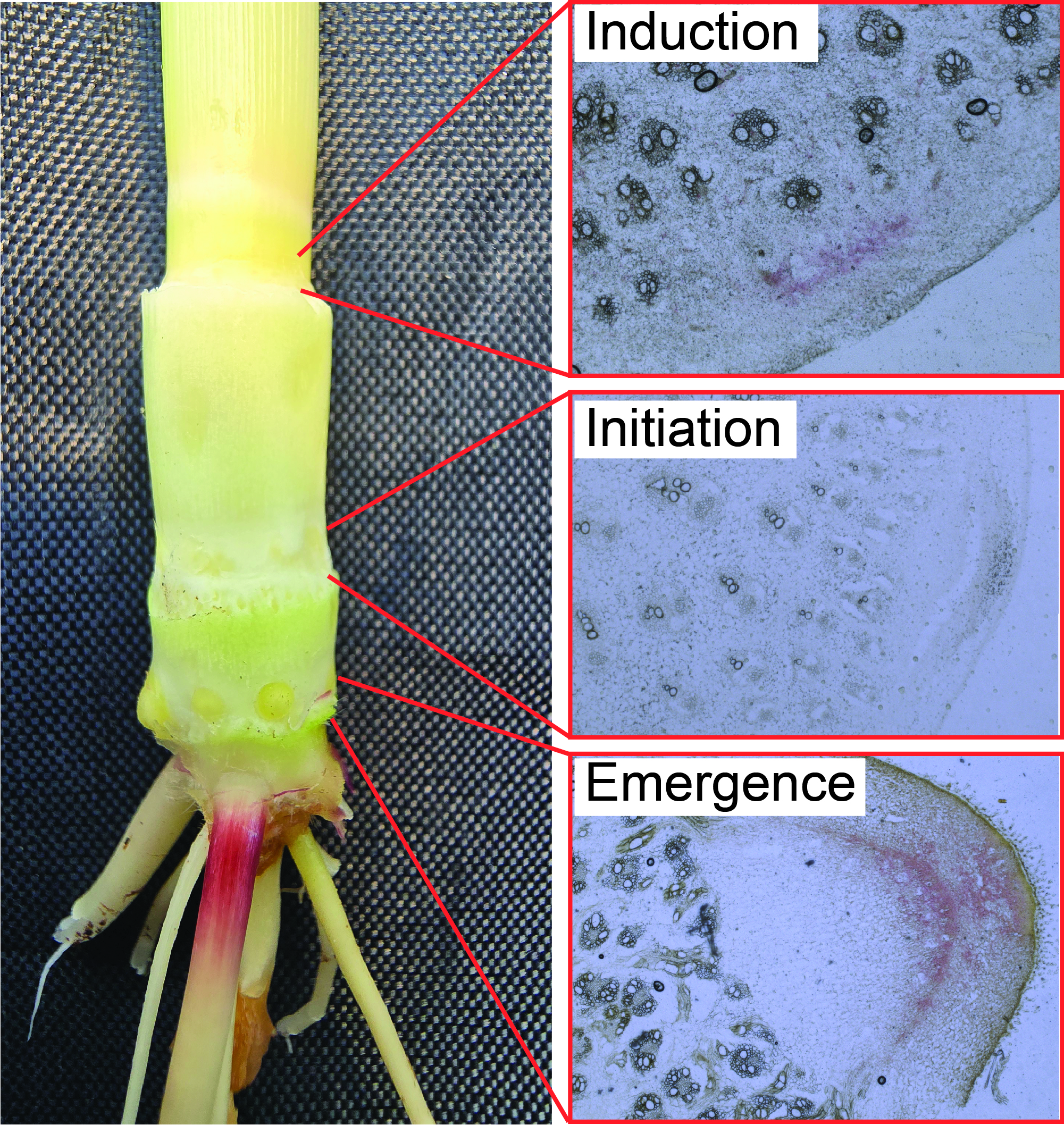
Three stages of brace root development.

The induction stage is anatomically indistinguishable from the rest of the stem. In this stage, a group of cortical cells receives a signal to become founder cells. Founder cell establishment is the first step towards new organ formation and founder cells are defined by their ability to divide within a fully mature tissue. Signals to establish founder cells could be transcription factors, phytohormones, and/or small RNAs, but these signals are yet to be defined in the context of brace root development.

==== Stage 2: Initiation ====
In the initiation stage, founder cells rapidly divide to form primordia and are anatomically distinct. Similarly, at the molecular level, gene expression also changes. One of the changes in gene expression includes rootless concerning crown and seminal roots (RTCS). RTCS is an auxin (phytohormone) responsive gene encoding a lateral organ boundary (LOB) domain transcription factor and is expressed in many types of root primordia including brace roots. RTCS interacts with auxin response factor34 (ARF34) to induce other downstream auxin-responsive genes. This induces a cascade of signaling that results in a series of cell divisions that form primordia. Therefore, a loss of function rtcs mutant lacks brace roots, seminal roots, and crown roots.

Another proposed regulator of brace root initiation is RHCP1. RCHP1 is a RING-HC protein, a member of the RING zinc finger protein family. Zinc finger protein family members are known for their regulatory role in gene transcription either by direct binding to DNA or interacting with other proteins. Although RHCP1 is expressed in many tissues (e.g., root, leaf, stem, seedling, immature ear, and tassel), the mRNA preferentially accumulates in brace root primordia. In addition, rhcp1 is responsive to abiotic stresses such as cold, heat, drought, and salt. RHCP1 has been proposed to link brace root development to environmental stressors. However, it is unknown whether a rhcp1 mutant affects brace root development or the mechanism of how RHCP1 regulates brace root development.

==== Stage 3: Emergence ====
In the emergence stage, brace roots emerge from aboveground stem nodes. The phytohormone ethylene has been shown to regulate emergence. Reducing ethylene responses by overexpressing ARGOS8 inhibits brace root emergence. In addition, external application of an ethylene precursor, 1-aminocyclopropane-1-carboxylic acid (ACC), to stem nodes induces the outgrowth of brace roots.

==== Stage 4: Elongation ====
In this stage, emerged brace roots continue growing towards the soil (gravitropic growth). This gravitropic growth was recently reported to be controlled by two genes, yucca2 (YUC2) and yucca4 (YUC4). Both YUC2 and YUC4 are preferentially expressed in brace root tips, and their proteins are localized in the cytoplasm and endoplasmic reticulum respectively. The single yuc4 and double yuc2;yuc4 mutants showed enlarged brace root angles as a result of impaired accumulation and redistribution of auxin in the brace root tips. In addition, both yuc4 and yuc2;4 displayed enhanced resistance to root lodging.

RTCS-like (RTCL) is another auxin-responsive gene. RTCL is a paralog of RTCS, but unlike the rtcs mutant which does not initiate roots, the rtcl mutant shows a defect in nodal root elongation. RTCL interacts with a stress-responsive protein (STR) exclusively in the cytosol suggesting its involvement in brace root stress response.

==== Stage Unknown ====
In addition to the genes highlighted above, which have been placed at specific stages of brace root development, there are additional genes that affect brace root development but have not yet been associated with any specific stages. A set of these genes result in fewer brace root whorls when mutated. This includes: related to apetala2.7 (RAP2.7), rootless1 (RT1), early phase change (EPC) and big embryo1 (BIGE1). Conversely, other genes result in more brace root whorls when mutated. These include the overexpression of mir156, which reduces squamosa promoter binding protein (SBP) transcription factor expression, mutants of teopod1, teopod2 and teopod3 (TP1, TP2 and TP3), co, constans, co-like and timing of cab1 (CCT10), dwarf1, dwarf3 and dwarf5 (D1, D3 and D5), anther ear1 (AN1), teosinte glume architecture1 (TGA1), and vivaparous8 (VP8). A detailed review of these genes can be found in Hostetler et al. 2022.

This list of genes is likely to grow significantly as research continues. Indeed, transcriptome profiling of early brace root development identified 307 up-regulated and 372 down-regulated genes, the majority of which have yet to be further investigated.

==== External environmental factors affecting brace roots development ====
As previously highlighted, brace root development is determined by a combination of internal genetic components and external environmental factors. There is currently a lack of studies directly testing the influence of environmental factors on brace root development, however, some studies have shown that the availability of water, nutrients, light, and humidity influences nodal root development.

The response of nodal root development to withholding water has been assessed in maize, sorghum, setaria, switchgrass, brachypodium, and teosinte. Withholding water resulted in nodal (crown) root arrest after emergence and inhibition of entry into the elongation stage. There were also more emerged roots in water-stressed plants than in well-watered plants, suggesting withholding water may induce early stages of nodal root development. The mechanism of crown and brace root response to water stress is likely similar but there are currently no studies that report the effect of water stress on brace roots.

Similar to water availability, nitrogen stress can have adverse effects on nodal root development. In some maize genotypes, nitrogen deficiency reduces the number of emerged roots per whorl, although crown versus brace root whorls were not distinguished. In a separate study, nitrogen deficiency was shown to induce steeper brace root angles, which is an outcome of altering the gravitropic response in the elongation stage.

Other environmental factors that may influence brace root development are light and humidity. It has been observed that plastic mulching at the base of maize plants induces more brace roots and accelerates brace root growth. This may be due to increased humidity and decreased light availability, which promotes ethylene production and retention. Additional support for light availability influencing the brace root development is when a maize plant is laid horizontally over a moisture-free surface with a light source at 90⁰ above, there is increased brace root emergence on the lower shaded side. However, the latter may also be due to gravity perception.

Another factor to consider is the planting depth. Planting depth affects the rate of germination and seminal root development, however, it might not impact brace root development. The crown, a highly compressed set of underground stem nodes, where crown roots develop, maintains a consistent depth regardless of planting depth. This consistency in the crown position is determined by a change in the red to far-red light ratio near the soil surface as the seedling emerges. When the coleoptile reaches near the soil surface, the change in light ratio alters hormone supply, halting mesocotyl elongation. As a result, the crown depth remains nearly the same (1/2 to 3/4 inch) for seeding depths of one inch or greater. Since brace roots form after the crown depth is established, they should not be directly affected by the planting depth, however, this has not been tested.

Whether for anchorage or for water and nutrient uptake, the anatomy, architecture, and function of brace roots is environmentally influenced. Overall, environmental impact on brace root development provides a valuable opportunity to investigate, identify, and enhance beneficial root traits. However, these external environmental factors are understudied and poorly defined. Thus, more studies are required to utilize environmental cue perception and response in brace root development to maximize their function in plant survival and fitness.
