= Vine sweet mini peppers =

The Vine Sweet mini pepper is a small, hybrid sweet pepper. The Vine Sweet mini pepper's size ranges from 1.5 inches to 4 inches, and can be found in red, orange, and yellow. The pepper was developed in the late 1990s by DNA Plant Technology, a wholly owned subsidiary of Bionova Produce Inc. that was subsequently shut down in 2002. The Vine Sweet mini peppers were sold under the Master'sTouch brand and distributed by Bionova Produce Inc..

Like many hybrid plants, the seeds from a Vine Sweet mini pepper may be sterile.
