= Vegetative phase change =

Transition in plants

Vegetative phase change is the juvenile-to-adult transition in plants. This transition is distinct from the reproductive transition and is most prolonged and pronounced in woody species. Manipulating phase change may be an important avenue for plant improvement.

In the model plant Arabidopsis thaliana, vegetative phase change is relatively subtle: leaves become more curled, with an increased number of abaxial trichomes, and increased serration. Studies in A. thaliana and maize identified microRNA MIR156 genes as master regulators of phase change, through their regulation of SQUAMOSA-PROMOTER-BINDING-LIKE (SBP/SPL) transcription factors. This gene regulatory circuit appears to be conserved (with variations) in all land plants, including mosses.

== See also ==
- Plant morphology
- Heteroblasty
