= Y1 (tobacco) =

Type of tobacco

Y1 is a strain of tobacco that was cross-bred by Brown & Williamson to obtain an unusually high nicotine content. It became controversial in the 1990s when the United States Food and Drug Administration (FDA) used it as evidence that tobacco companies were intentionally manipulating the nicotine content of cigarettes. Y1 has also been investigated by the Pan American Health Organization (PAHO).

== Development and use ==
Y1 was developed by tobacco plant researcher James Chaplin, for Brown & Williamson, then a subsidiary of British American Tobacco, in the late 1970s, with the approval of the president at the time, Joseph E. Edens. Chapin, a director of the USDA Research Laboratory at Oxford, North Carolina, had described the need for a higher nicotine tobacco plant in the trade publication World Tobacco in 1977. Chapin had bred a number of high-nicotine strains based on a hybrid of Nicotiana tabacum and Nicotiana rustica, but they were weak and would blow over in a strong wind.

B&W tested five strains on a farm in Wilson, North Carolina in 1983. Only two grew to maturity; Y2, which "turned black in the drying barn and smelled like old socks," and Y1, which was a success. B&W brought the plants to California company DNA Plant Technology for additional modification, including making the plants male-sterile, a procedure that prevents competitors from reproducing the strain from seeds. DNA Plant Technology then smuggled the seeds to a B&W subsidiary in Brazil. A 1991 industry document analyzing the potential of Y1 reported that it had been successfully grown in Brazil, Honduras and Zimbabwe but not Venezuela, and that it was both difficult to cure and susceptible to Granville wilt.

Brown & Williamson initially attempted to patent Y1 in the United States in 1991; this was denied. A year later, B&W attempted to patent Y1 in Brazil; this was also denied. An appeal against the US patent denial was rejected in 1994, and later that year all patent applications were withdrawn.

Y1 has a higher nicotine content than conventional flue-cured tobacco (6.5% versus 3.2—3.5%). It has a comparable amount of tar, and does not affect taste or aroma. British American Tobacco (BAT) began to discuss the trialling of Y1 tobacco in 1991, despite it not being approved for use in the United States. One ex-employee of BAT stated that Y1 tobacco started to be widely used in cigarettes in the US in 1993. Tobacco company executives initially denied intentionally manipulating nicotine levels in cigarettes, but eventually acknowledged blending Y1 into brands including Raleigh, Prime and Summit in order to maintain the flavor and nicotine level of the product while lowering the tar content.

B&W continued to insist that Y1 was not used to raise nicotine levels, stating "the brands that use Y1 deliver essentially the same nicotine as the products they replaced." B&W promised in 1994 to stop using Y1, but at that time they had 7 million pounds (3,200 tonnes) of inventory, and continued to blend Y1 into their products until 1999. Y1 was also shipped to BAT's cigarette plant in Southampton, England and to subsidiaries in Germany and Finland, but whether it was used in commercial production is unclear.

== Legal controversy ==
Beginning in 1990, the United States Food and Drug Administration (FDA), under Commissioner David Kessler, conducted an investigation into the tobacco industry, including charges that cigarette manufacturers intentionally manipulated nicotine levels in cigarettes to keep their customers addicted. In early 1994, B&W told the FDA that there was an agreement among US cigarette manufacturers not to manipulate nicotine levels in tobacco. However, FDA investigators discovered a Brazilian patent describing a tobacco plant with an unusually high nicotine content, which led them to B&W and Y1.

In testimony before Congress in June 1994, Kessler accused B&W of knowingly manipulating nicotine levels in some of its cigarettes. B&W chairman Thomas Sandefur rejected the claim, stating that "the brands that use Y1 deliver essentially the same nicotine as the products they replaced" and accusing Kessler of "grandstanding" for political purposes. Several members of Congress suggested that this proved that tobacco executives had committed perjury when they denied knowing smoking was addictive in their April 1994 testimony before Congress.

Y1 became an important piece of evidence in FDA v. Brown & Williamson Tobacco Corp., a lawsuit in which the FDA attempted to exert its authority under the Federal Food, Drug, and Cosmetic Act to regulate tobacco products. Kessler argued that because Y1 had been raised for its higher nicotine level, it was subject to FDA regulation as a pharmacological product, and therefore its importation and sale in the US without the proper FDA approval was illegal. The FDA also targeted DNA Plant Technology, charging that it had illegally smuggled the Y1 seeds out of the United States.

The Justice Department charged DNA Plant Technology with one misdemeanor count of conspiracy to violate the Tobacco Seed Export law, prohibiting the export of tobacco seeds without a permit, a law which was repealed in 1991. DNA Plant Technology pleaded guilty in 1998 and agreed to cooperate with further investigations of B&W. However, the Supreme Court eventually ruled in March 2000 that the FDA did not have the authority to regulate tobacco as a drug.

The discovery of Y1 fueled allegations that B&W intentionally used Y1 tobacco to increase the addictiveness of its products, resulting in a number of lawsuits. The state of Minnesota heavily referred to Y1 tobacco in its 1997 trial against the American tobacco industry (State of Minnesota et al. v. Philip Morris, Inc., et al.), a trial which took place prior to the inception of the Tobacco Master Settlement Agreement in November 1998.
