= Carolyn Napoli =

Botanist and bioinformatician

- Known for: co-discovery of the mechanism of co-suppression
- Scientific career
- Fields: Plant biology
- Institutions: University of Arizona

Carolyn Napoli was a plant biologist who co-discovered the mechanism of co-suppression, gene silencing which, like transposon silencing, was first discovered in plants. The significance of the discovery of co-suppression was described by NOVA scienceNOW in 2005.

== Research and career ==
At the University of Florida, in the Soil Sciences Department laboratory of David H. Hubbell, Napoli demonstrated for the first time using electron microscopy, the development of infection by the soil bacterium, Rhizobium trifolii, in Trifolium (clover) root hairs.

Napoli continued her Rhizobium research in the laboratory of Peter Albersheim at the University of Colorado Boulder and later the lab of Larry Gold in the Department of Molecular, Cellular and Developmental Biology. before leaving for the laboratory of Brian Staskawicz at University of California, Berkeley to work on plant avirulence genes.

Transitioning from academia to industry, Napoli joined collaborator Richard A. Jorgensen at the Oakland-based agricultural biotechnology company Advanced Genetic Sciences, Inc. (AGS) which was acquired later by DNA Plant Technology Corporation. At AGS, Napoli and Jorgensen sought to increase flower pigmentation by overexpressing the gene encoding the Chalcone Synthase (CHS) by using a vector for high-level translation designed by their AGS colleague Jonathan Jones. The antisense CHS construct they deployed in Petunia plants created novel flower color distribution. One of these patterns, dubbed "Cossack Dancer," was featured in The Plant Cell 30-year retrospective, "Refections on Plant Cell Classics,". These observations documented by Napoli and Jorgensen are examples of "co-suppression," – a post transcriptional gene silencing mechanism predating the discovery of RNA interference (RNAi).

From DNAP, Napoli accepted a faculty position in the Department of Environmental Horticulture at the University of California, Davis (UCD) where she deployed a strategy of ethyl methanesulfonate (EMS) to produce mutations in both Petunia and Arabidopsis seeds. By screening over 1,200 mutants she identified a bushy phenotype that she termed "decreased apical dominance" or "dad" mutants and subsequently published her analysis of the reversal of this phenomenon by grafting in the journal Plant Physiology. In collaboration with Loverine Taylor, Napoli identified a phenotype that was used as a selectable marker for plant breeding research.

Following UCD, Napoli joined the Department of Plant Sciences at the University of Arizona (UA) where she focused on designing and distributing resources to the Arabidopsis and maize research communities under the auspices of an National Science Foundation Plant Genome Research Program grant led by Jorgensen and Vicki Chandler. At UA, Napoli launched the NSF-funded ChromDB (Chromatin Database), a platform for displaying chromatin-associated proteins, including RNAi-associated proteins, for a range of organisms.

== Awards and honors ==
In 2023, Napoli was recognized as a Pioneer Member of the American Society of Plant Biologists.

== Death ==
Napoli died August 19, 2025, in Bonny Doon, California.
