= Richard A. Jorgensen =

American biologist

Richard A. Jorgensen (born 1951) is an American molecular geneticist and an early pioneer in the study of post transcriptional gene silencing.

== Biography ==
From 1965 through 1969 he attended Loyola Academy in Wilmette, Illinois, a college preparatory school. Jorgensen holds a B.S. in biomedical engineering and a M.S. in chemistry from Northwestern University, which he attended from 1969 through 1973. In 1978, he received a Ph.D. in biochemistry from the University of Wisconsin–Madison. He did postdoctoral research at the Carnegie Institution's plant biology department at Stanford University with William F Thompson, and then at the University of California at Davis in the department of genetics with Robert W. Allard. From 1983 to 1990, he was employed at Advanced Genetic Sciences, Inc., which became DNA Plant Technology Corp., where he was director of floriculture genetic engineering and did the initial work on cosuppression. From 1990 to 1997, he was a research geneticist at UC Davis, and from 1997 to 2010 he was associate professor and then professor at the University of Arizona where he held the Bud Antle Chair for Excellence in Agricultural and Life Sciences.

His and Carolyn Napoli's observations of pigment gene "cosuppression" in Petunia flowers are examples of post transcriptional gene silencing that predated the discovery of RNA interference (RNAi) and contributed to the current understanding of the commonality of RNA-mediated gene silencing in eukaryotes. Their initial observations were made while working at the U.S. biotech company DNA Plant Technology and form part of the basis of a number of U.S. patents on gene regulation and crop manipulation. The significance of the discovery of cosuppression was described by NOVA scienceNOW in 2005. Jorgensen's primary focus on the problem of cosuppression in petunia has been on the epigenetic aspects of the phenomenon and the relationship between cosuppression (RNAi) and epigenetics. Together with William Lucas at UC Davis and others he proposed the existence of an RNA Information Superhighway in plants by which information is transmitted throughout the plant via RNA molecules which influence gene expression and epigenetic state Jorgensen was awarded the 2007 Martin Gibbs Medal by the American Society of Plant Biologists "for his pioneering work leading to the discovery of RNA interference (RNAi)." He was elected an Inaugural Fellow of the American Society of Plant Biologists in 2007 and a Fellow of the American Association for the Advancement of Sciences.

From 2003 through 2007 Jorgensen served as editor-in-chief of The Plant Cell, a research journal in plant biology. From 2007 to 2009 he was director of the iPlant Collaborative, a 5-year, $50 million project to develop cyberinfrastructure for the plant sciences. According to the US National Science Foundation (NSF) awarding agency, this was "the first national cyberinfrastructure center to tackle global "grand challenge" plant biology questions that have great implications on larger questions regarding the environment, agriculture, energy and the very organisms that sustain our existence on earth". Researchers relied heavily on computational thinking, allowing them to focus on creative thinking a computer could not do.

Jorgensen became professor investigador at LANGEBIO (Laboratorio Nacional de Genomica para la Biodiversidad), a new research institute in the Mexican federal CINVESTAV research system located in Irapuato, Guanajuato, Mexico. He retained a title as professor emeritus in the School of Plant Sciences at the University of Arizona. His research interests are in computational biology.
