= Squamosa promoter binding protein =

InterPro Family

SBP
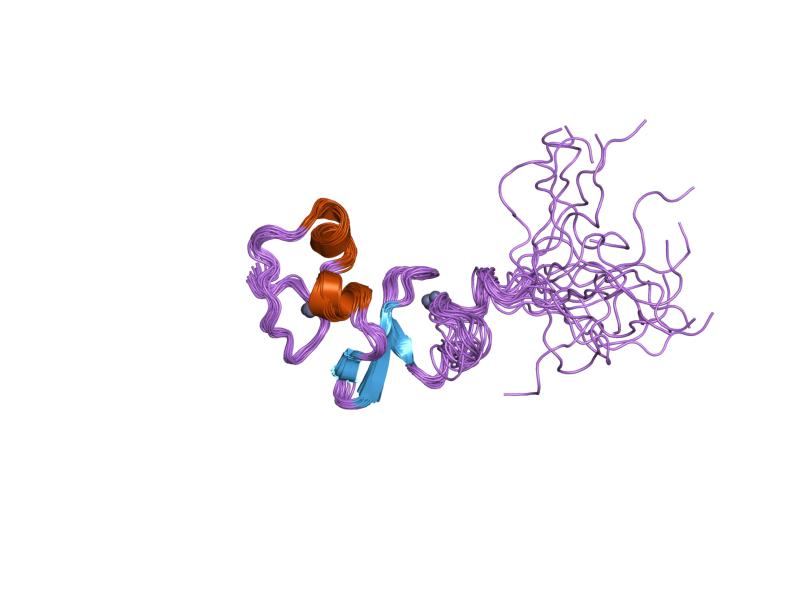
- Solution structure of the DNA-binding domain of Squamosa promoter binding protein-like 4

Identifiers
- Symbol: SBP
- Pfam: PF03110
- InterPro: IPR004333
- PROSITE: PDOC00798
- SCOP2: 2lao / SCOPe / SUPFAM
- TCDB: 3.A.1
Available protein structures:
- PDB: IPR004333 PF03110 (ECOD; PDBsum)
- AlphaFold: IPR004333; PF03110

The SQUAMOSA promoter binding protein-like (SBP or SPL) family of transcription factors are defined by a plant-specific DNA-binding domain. The founding member of the family was identified based on its specific in vitro binding to the promoter of the snapdragon SQUAMOSA gene. SBP proteins are thought to be transcriptional activators.

== Function ==
SPB proteins have roles in leaf development, vegetative phase change, flower and fruit development, plant architecture, sporogenesis, Gibberelic acid signaling and toxin response.

== Structure ==
The domain contains 10 conserved cysteine and histidine residues that probably are zinc ligands. The SBP domain is a highly conserved DNA-binding domain. It is approximately 80 amino acids in length and contains a zinc finger motif with two zinc-binding sites: Cys-Cys-His-Cys and Cys-Cys-Cys-His. It has a three-stranded antiparallel beta-sheet.
