= Woody plant =

Plant that produces wood and has a hard stem

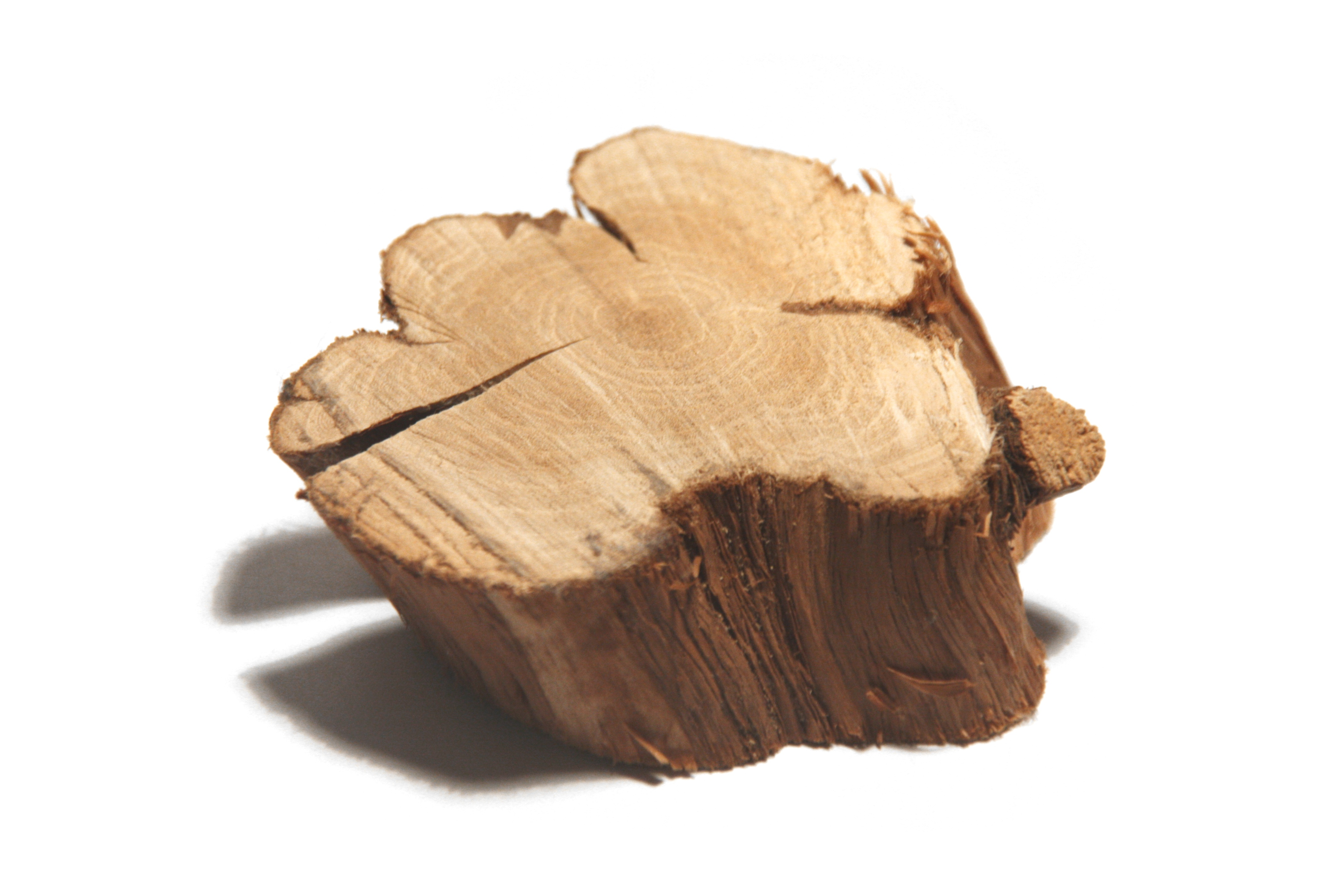
A section of rosemary stem, an example of a woody plant, showing a typical wood structure

A woody plant is a plant that produces wood as its structural tissue and thus has a hard stem. In cold climates, woody plants further survive winter or dry season above ground, as opposed to herbaceous plants that die back to the ground until spring.

== Characteristics ==
Woody plants include trees, shrubs, or lianas. These are usually perennials whose stems and larger roots are reinforced with wood produced from secondary xylem. The main stem, larger branches, and roots of these plants are usually covered by a layer of bark. Wood is a structural tissue that allows woody plants to grow from above-ground stems year after year, thus making some woody plants the largest and tallest terrestrial plants.

Woody plants, like herbaceous perennials, typically have a dormant period of the year when growth does not take place. This occurs in temperate and continental areas due to freezing temperatures and lack of daylight during the winter months. Meanwhile, dormancy in subtropical and tropical climates is due to the dry season; when low precipitation limits water available for growth. The dormant period will be accompanied by abscission (if the plant is deciduous). Evergreen plants do not lose all their leaves at once (they instead shed them gradually over the growing season), however growth virtually halts during the dormant season. Many woody plants native to the subtropics and tropics are evergreen due to year-round warm temperatures and rainfall. However, in many regions with a tropical savanna climate or a monsoon subtropical climate, a lengthy dry season precludes evergreen vegetation, instead promoting the predominance of deciduous trees.

During the fall months, each stem in a deciduous plant cuts off the flow of nutrients and water to the leaves. This causes them to change colors as the chlorophyll in the leaves breaks down. Special cells are formed that sever the connection between the leaf and stem, so that it will easily detach. Evergreen plants do not shed their leaves, merely go into a state of low activity during the dormant season (in order to acclimate to cold temperatures or low rainfall). During spring, the roots begin sending nutrients back up to the canopy.

When the growing season resumes, either with warm weather or the wet season, the plant will break bud by sending out new leaf or flower growth. This is accompanied by growth of new stems from buds on the previous season's wood. In colder climates, most stem growth occurs during spring and early summer. When the dormant season begins, the new growth hardens off and becomes woody. Once this happens, the stem will no longer grow in length; however, it will continue to expand in diameter for the rest of the plant's life.

Most woody plants native to colder climates have distinct growth rings produced by each year's production of new vascular tissue. Only the outer handful of rings contain living tissue (the cambium, xylem, phloem, and sapwood). Inner layers contain heartwood, which is dead tissue that serves primarily as structural support.

== Growth ==
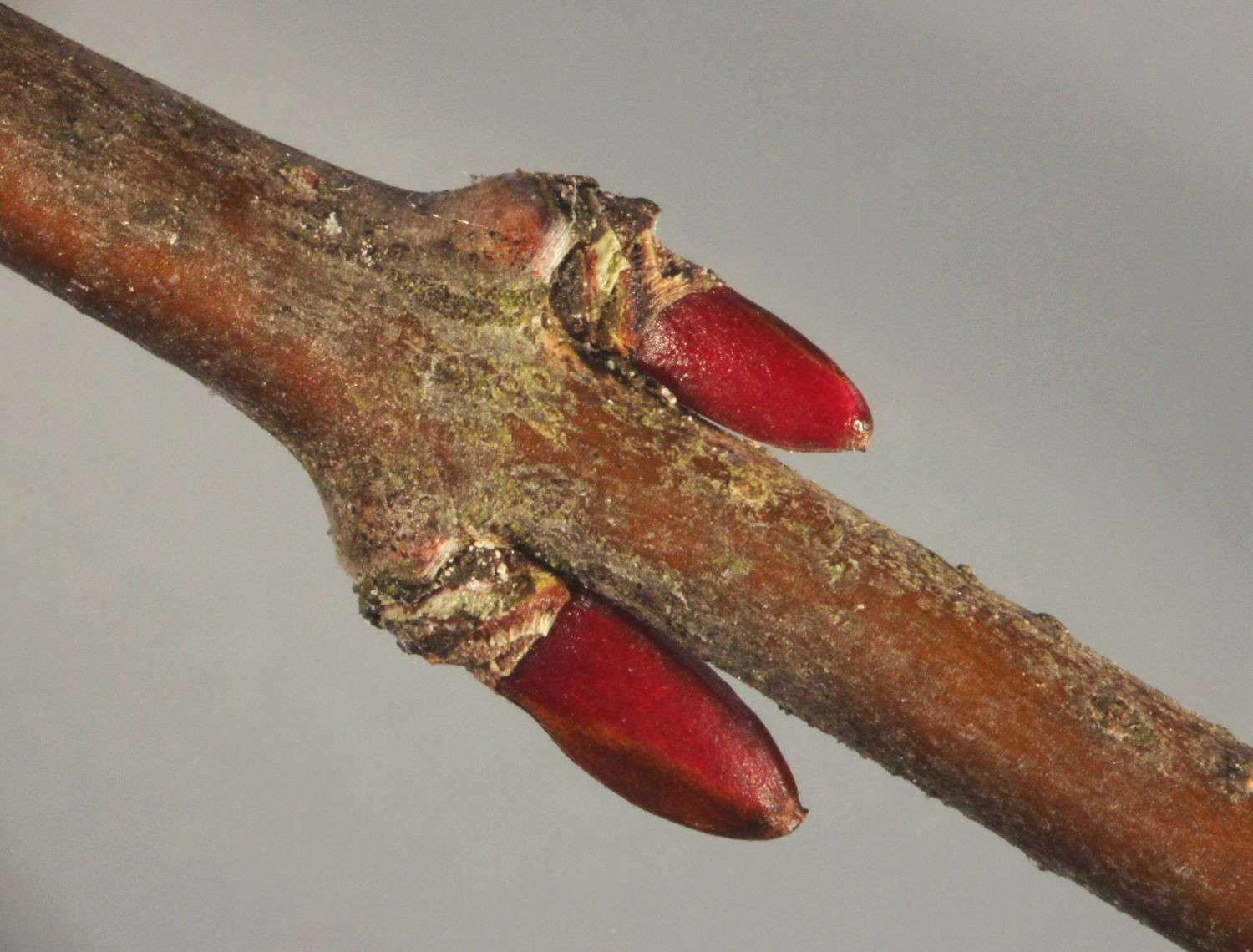
Winter buds on Cercidiphyllum japonicum

Stem growth primarily occurs out of the terminal bud on the tip of the stem. Axillary buds are suppressed by the terminal bud and produce less growth, unless it is removed by human or natural action. Without a terminal bud, the side buds will have nothing to suppress them and begin rapidly sending out growth, if cut during spring. By late summer and early autumn, most active growth for the season has ceased and pruning a stem will result in little or no new growth. Winter buds are formed when the dormant season begins. Depending on the plant, these buds contain either new leaf growth, new flowers, or both.

Terminal buds have a stronger dominance on conifers than broadleaf plants, thus conifers will normally grow a single straight trunk without forking or large side branches.

As a woody plant grows, it will often lose lower leaves and branches as they become shaded out by the canopy. If a given stem is producing an insufficient amount of energy for the plant, the roots will "abort" it by cutting off the flow of water and nutrients, causing it to gradually die.

Below ground, the root system expands each growing season in much the same manner as the stems. The roots grow in length and send out smaller lateral roots. At the end of the growing season, the newly grown roots become woody and cease future length expansion, but will continue to expand in diameter. However, unlike the above-ground portion of the plant, the root system continues to grow, although at a slower rate, throughout the dormant season. In cold-weather climates, root growth will continue as long as temperatures are above 2 °C (36 °F).

== Tissue composition ==
Wood is primarily composed of xylem cells with cell walls made of cellulose and lignin. Xylem is a vascular tissue which moves water and nutrients from the roots to the leaves. Most woody plants form new layers of woody tissue each year, and so increase their stem diameter from year to year, with new wood deposited on the inner side of a vascular cambium layer located immediately beneath the bark. However, in some monocotyledons such as palms and dracaenas, the wood is formed in bundles scattered through the interior of the trunk. Stem diameter increases continuously throughout the growing season and halts during the dormant period.

== Symbol ==
The symbol for a woody plant, based on Species Plantarum by Linnaeus is.

== See also ==
- Arboriculture
- Dendrology
- Inosculation
- Vascular plant
