= William Sharp (scientist) =

American biotechnologist and entrepreneur

William Sharp is a biotechnologist and entrepreneur, who holds a PhD in plant cell biology from Rutgers University. He is well known for his application of science into business, creating both start up companies and extensive technology transfer experience across the Americas and Asia in a broad sector of business ventures.

== Papers ==
Sharp has authored over seventy original research papers, abstracts and books in the field of plant cell biology including co-editing Plant Cell and Tissue Culture, The Ohio State University Press, Columbus, Ohio 1977 the five volume series entitled the Handbook of Plant Cell Culture, Volumes 1–5, MACMILLIAM Publishing Company, New York 1983–1986)and Reflections & Connections and Personal Journeys Through The Life Sciences, Volumes I & II, ScienceTechPublishers, LLC, Lewes, Delaware 2014.

== Positions ==
Sharp serves as a member of The Ohio State University College of Arts and Sciences Advisory Committee, the Ohio state University STEAM Factory, and the Ohio State University, Rutgers University, and University of São Paulo Tripartite Collaborative Program.

Sharp was the former Professor and Dean of Research at Cook College; Director of Research at New Jersey Agricultural Experiment Station at Rutgers University, Executive Vice-president of DNA Pharmaceuticals Inc., Executive Vice-president for Research at DNA Plant Technology Corp, Research Director at Pioneer Research, Campbell Institute for Research & Technology, the Campbell Soup Company a Full Professor at the Ohio State University, Visiting professor, Center for Nuclear Energy in Agriculture, University of São Paulo, and Fellow of the Argonne National Laboratory.

== Achievements ==
Sharp was a Fulbright Grantee during 1971 and 1973. He received the distinctive honor of having the Rod Sharp Professor of Microbiology, Ohio State University and the William "Rod" Sharp Biotechnology Conference Room, University of São Paulo named for him, recipient of the University of São Paulo Eminent Professorship and the Luiz Queiroz Distinguished Service Medal award from the University of São Paulo.

Sharp was awarded The Board of Trustees Distinguished Service Award in recognition for his contributions to the Colleges of Arts and Sciences from The Ohio State University by President Gordon Gee at graduation commencement on December 9, 2007, and more recently the College of Arts and Sciences 2016 Alumni Distinguished service Award.

Sharp continues to mentor and advise his former students.

Sharp is the father of Gotham Film and Media Institute executive director and film producer Jeff (Jeffrey) Sharp, Executive Director, Gotham Film and Media Institute, Brooklyn, NY.
