= Somaclonal variation =

Somaclonal variation is the variation seen in plants that have been produced by plant tissue culture. Chromosomal rearrangements are an important source of this variation. Somaclonal variation occurs across a wide range of plant taxa, including species with different ploidy levels, breeding systems, and modes of propagation. Characters affected include both qualitative and quantitative traits.

Somaclonal variation is not restricted to, but is particularly common in, plants regenerated from callus. The variations can be genotypic or phenotypic, which in the latter case can be either genetic or epigenetic in origin. Typical genetic alterations are: changes in chromosome numbers (polyploidy and aneuploidy), chromosome structure (translocations, deletions, insertions and duplications) and DNA sequence (base mutations). A typical epigenetic alteration is changes in DNA methylation, which can arise during tissue culture and contribute to somaclonal variation.

If no visual, morphogenic changes are apparent, other plant screening procedures must be applied. There are both benefits and disadvantages to somaclonal variation. The phenomenon of high variability in individuals from plant cell cultures or adventitious shoots has been named somaclonal variation.

== Advantages ==
The major likely benefit of somaclonal variation is plant and crop improvement. Somaclonal variation can generate additional genetic variability. Characteristics for which somaclonal mutants can be enriched during in vitro culture include resistance to disease pathotoxins, herbicides, high salt concentration, mineral toxicity, tolerance to environmental or chemical stress, and increased production of secondary metabolites.

Such variation can be exploited in plant breeding programs to select lines with desirable traits.

== Disadvantages ==
A serious disadvantage of somaclonal variation occurs in operations which require clonal uniformity, as in the horticulture and forestry industries where tissue culture is employed for rapid propagation of elite genotypes.

- Sometimes leads to undesirable results
- Selected variants are random and genetically unstable
- Require extensive and extended field trials
- Not suitable for complex agronomic traits like yield, quality etc.
- May develop variants with pleiotropic effects.

== Reducing somaclonal variation ==
Different steps can be used to reduce somaclonal variation. Increasing numbers of subcultures increase the likelihood of somaclonal variation, so the number of subcultures in micropropagation protocols should be kept to a minimum.Regular reinitiation of clones from new explants might reduce variability over time. Avoiding 2,4-D in culture media can also reduce somaclonal variation, as this hormone is known to introduce variation.

== Avoidance through tissue culture–independent methods ==
Recent advances in plant transformation and gene editing have focused on avoiding somaclonal variation by bypassing tissue culture entirely. Traditional transformation methods typically require in vitro regeneration, which is a major source of somaclonal variation.

Tissue culture–independent approaches, including in planta transformation and direct delivery of gene editing reagents, can reduce or eliminate the occurrence of somaclonal variation by avoiding prolonged callus phases.

These methods are being actively developed to improve the efficiency, reliability, and accessibility of plant genome editing, particularly in species that are recalcitrant to tissue culture.

== See also ==
- Somatic embryogenesis
