= C2H3ClO =

The molecular formula C_{2}H_{3}ClO (molar mass: 78.50 g/mol, exact mass: 77.9872 u) may refer to:

- Acetyl chloride
- Chloroacetaldehyde
- Chloroethylene oxide
