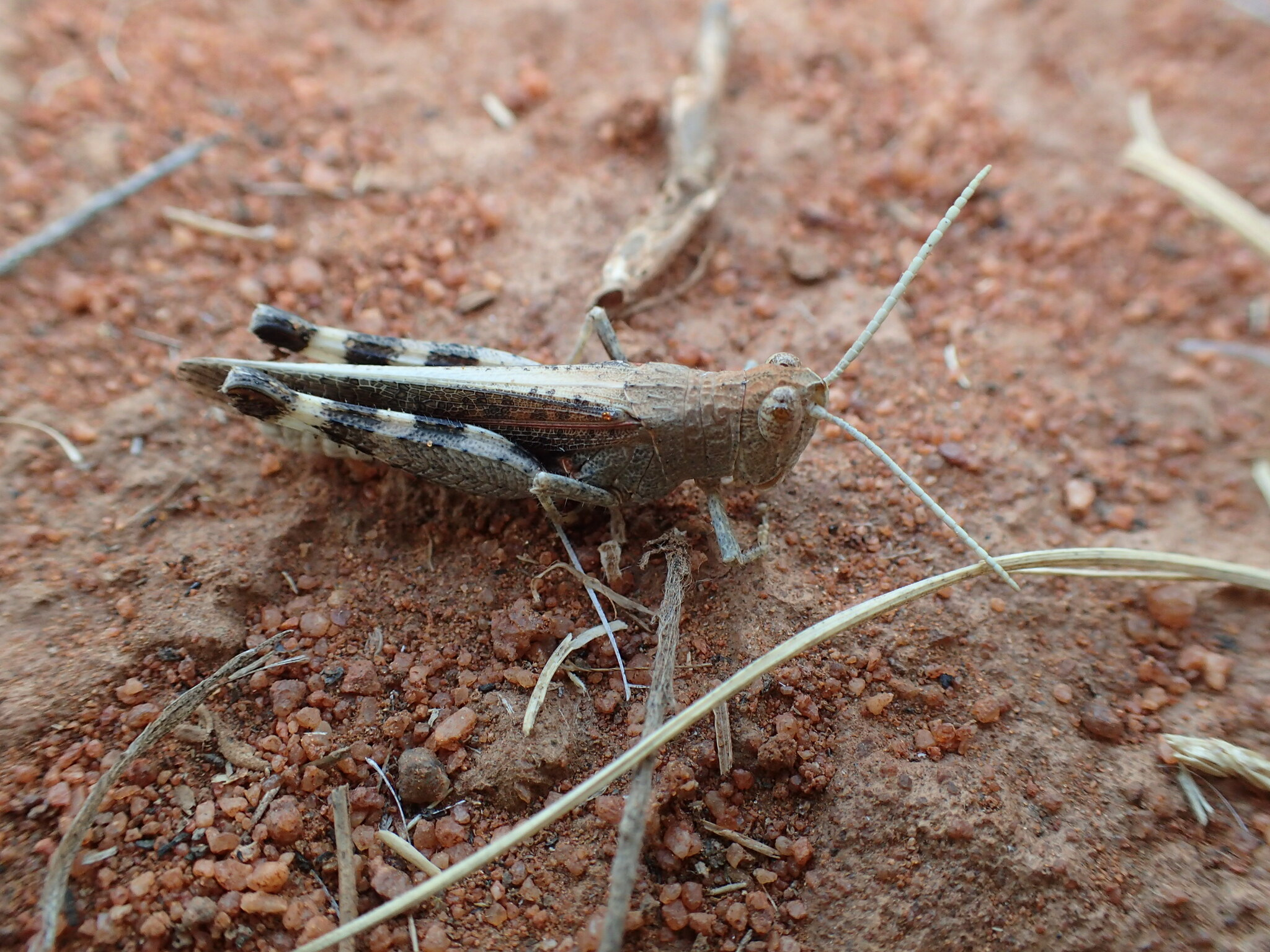

Scientific classification
- Kingdom: Animalia
- Phylum: Arthropoda
- Clade: Pancrustacea
- Class: Insecta
- Order: Orthoptera
- Suborder: Caelifera
- Family: Acrididae
- Genus: Desertaria
- Species: D. fasciata

Binomial name
- Desertaria fasciata Sjöstedt, 1920
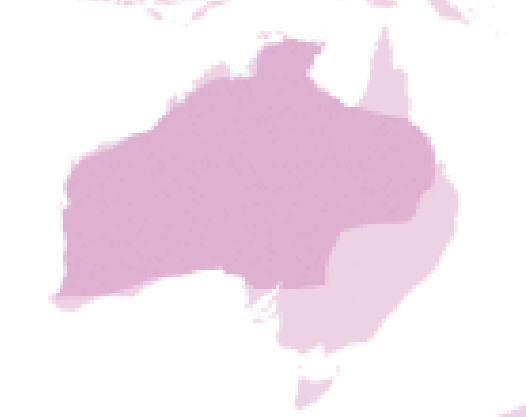

= Desertaria fasciata =

Striped ungee-gungee

Species of grasshopper

Desertaria fasciata is a species of grasshopper commonly known as the striped ungee-gungee. It is similar to the common grasshopper or locust found throughout Australia. Its shape is also similar to the common Australian grasshopper. Its colour is a slight orange/red tinge that is similar to the environments it is found in. Its developmental mode is hemimetabolous and uses biting/chewing mouthparts it feeds on plant matter. Grasshoppers in the Acrididae family are characterized by having the auditory organs (ears) positioned on each side of the first abdominal segments which are covered by the wings. The antennae's are considerably short and only extending less than half of the grasshoppers total body length.

== Ecology and behaviour ==
The striped ungee-gungee has been observed in most parts of Australia, including the states of Northern Territory, Queensland, New South Wales, South Australia, and Western Australia. Most observations have been in central Australia where climate is hot desert and hot semi-arid climate types. There have been observations as far west as Ennuin (Western Australia) and the most easterly observation in Sturt National Park in New South Wales. Like most organisms in the infraorder Acrididae, this species feeds on mostly plant matter including, grass, leaves and roots.

== Taxonomy ==
Desertaria fasciata was named by the Swedish naturalist Yngve Söstedt in 1920 after the Swedish scientific expeditions to Australia of Eric Mjöberg where many organisms including Desertaria fasciata were discovered. The grasshopper fauna of Australia exhibits traits that are conditioned for species that have endured prolonged geographical isolation, which includes Desertaria fasciata.
