= Liver angiosarcoma =

- Other names: Hepatic angiosarcoma, angiosarcoma of the liver
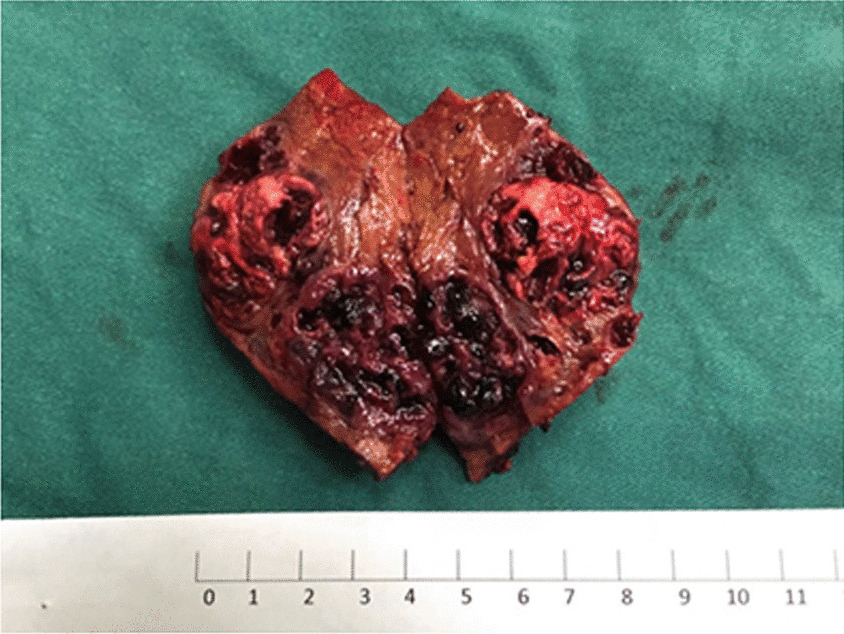
- Specimen of a surgically removed and dissected liver angiosarcoma with visible necrosis and bleeding
- Specialty: Oncology
- Symptoms: Asymptomatic, abdominal pain, weight loss, anorexia, fatigue
- Complications: Disseminated intravascular coagulation, tumor rupture
- Usual onset: Age 60-70
- Causes: Unknown, exposure to arsenic, thorotrast, vinyl chloride
- Diagnostic method: Biopsy, imaging
- Differential diagnosis: Hemangioma, hepatocellular carcinoma
- Treatment: Surgery, chemotherapy
- Prognosis: Poor, most die within 6 months
- Frequency: 200 new diagnoses per year worldwide

Liver angiosarcoma also known as angiosarcoma of the liver or hepatic angiosarcoma is a rare and rapidly fatal cancer arising from endothelial cells that line the blood vessels of the liver. It is a type of angiosarcoma. Although very rare with around 200 cases diagnosed each year, it is still considered the third most common primary liver cancer, making up around 2% of all primary liver cancers. Liver angiosarcoma can be primary (referred to in literature as PHA or primary hepatic angiosarcoma), meaning it arose in the liver, or secondary, meaning the angiosarcoma arose elsewhere and metastasized to the liver. This article covers PHA, however much is also applicable to secondary tumors.

== Signs and symptoms ==
Liver angiosarcoma usually presents with vague and non-specific symptoms such as abdominal pain, abdominal distension (which are the two most common symptoms, occurring in around 60% of individuals), weight loss, fatigue or abdominal masses and liver disease like symptoms such as fever, malaise, anorexia and vomiting.

Paradoxically, liver function is generally maintained until the final stages of the disease, further complicating diagnosis.

=== Complications ===
Spontaneous tumor rupture resulting in severe intra-abdominal bleeding and hemoperitoneum is a possibly fatal complication of liver angiosarcoma and is reported in 15–27% of patients. Thrombocytopenia, anemia and the vascular nature of the tumor may contribute to this. Tumor rupture generally carries a very poor prognosis even when bleeding is stopped by means of emergency transcathether arterial embolization (TAE), an analysis of four patients showed a median survival of 23 days following tumor rupture. Due to the close and similarly vascular nature of the spleen, metastasis to it is common and therefore intra-abdominal bleeding may also be caused by splenic rupture.

Liver angiosarcoma may also result in liver failure, a potentially fatal complication.

Like many cancers, liver angiosarcoma can also cause disseminated intravascular coagulation (DIC).

== Causes ==
Most liver angiosarcoma cases are of unknown etiology, making up around 75% of cases.

Despite this, several things are associated with liver angiosarcoma. Exposure to vinyl chloride, arsenic, thorotrast, radium, phenylhydrazine and use of androgens is known to contribute to the pathogenesis of liver angiosarcoma. Cyclophosphamide, diethylstilbestrol and oral contraceptives use are also associated with liver angiosarcoma.

In addition liver angiosarcoma is associated with hemochromatosis (iron overload) and neurofibromatosis.

A 2007 case report suggests a possible link between Schistosoma japonicum liver fibrosis and liver angiosarcoma.

A study in Taiwan found no evidence to suggest that viral hepatitis a significant role in the pathogenesis of liver angiosarcoma.

== Diagnosis ==
CD31 is considered the most reliable tumor marker for liver angiosarcoma.

=== Differential diagnosis ===
Differential diagnosis includes hemangioma, Kaposi's sarcoma, metastatic angiosarcoma of non liver origin, secondary liver cancer from any origin and hepatocellular carcinoma.

== Treatment ==
Complete surgical resection combined with adjuvant chemotherapy is considered to be the most effective treatment of liver angiosarcoma.

Transcatheter arterial embolization (TAE), blocking an artery with the help of a catheter to prevent further bleeding or limit blood supply to the tumor, resulting in suppressed growth, is the most effective treatment for spontaneous rupture of the tumor resulting in intra-abdominal bleeding. Transcatheter arterial chemoembolization (TACE), which is the same as TAE, but also involves the regional injection of chemotherapy drugs, has shown effectiveness at increasing survival, particularly in individuals with few dominant masses rather than several smaller. TACE allows for simultaneously increasing regional (and therefore also tumor) exposure to chemotherapy while reducing systemic exposure, which both allows for an increased dose, as systemic exposure is generally the limiting factor, and also reduced side effects of chemotherapy. TACE and TAE are both generally performed on the hepatic artery.

Liver angiosarcomas are generally reported to be radioresistant and therefore radiation therapy is not considered an effective treatment.

Although previously considered a viable treatment option, liver transplantation is no longer considered for liver angiosarcoma, due to its high reoccurrence rate and poor post transplantation survival. The European Liver Transplant Registry considers liver angiosarcoma an absolute contraindication to liver transplantation, reporting that the median survival following liver transplantation is less than 7 months with no one surviving more than 23 months, showing very little difference from no treatment at all.

== Prognosis ==
Due to the aggressive nature and high recurrence rate, the prognosis for liver angiosarcoma is generally very poor. Most patients die within six months and only 3% live more than two years.

A recent case report suggest that the prognosis of liver angiosarcoma may be improving.

== Epidemiology ==
Although liver angiosarcoma can affect anyone, most people affected are 60–70 years old. Males are affected more often than women at a ratio of 3-4:1, although in children, girls are affected more commonly than boys.
