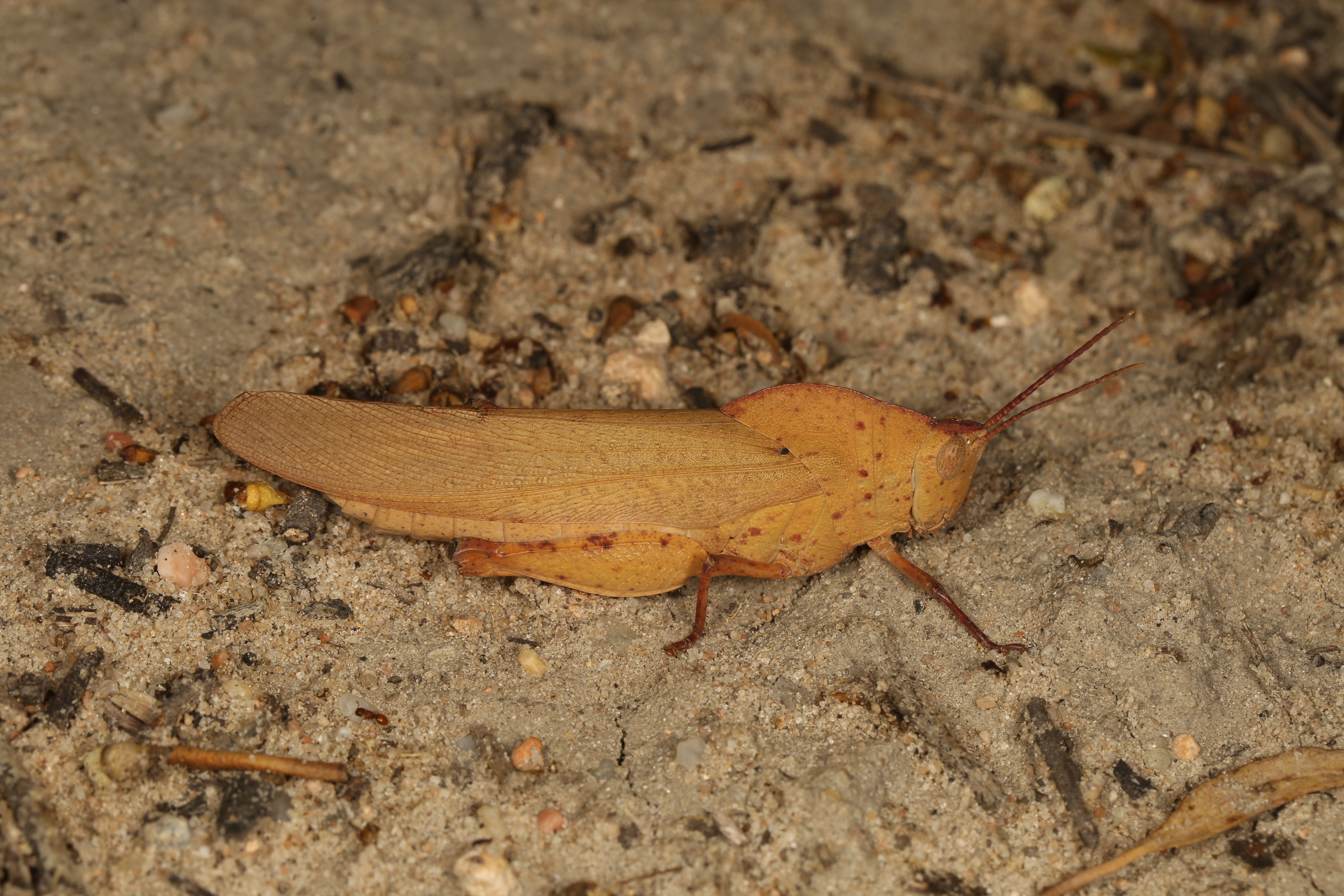

Scientific classification
- Domain: Eukaryota
- Kingdom: Animalia
- Phylum: Arthropoda
- Class: Insecta
- Order: Orthoptera
- Suborder: Caelifera
- Family: Acrididae
- Genus: Goniaea
- Species: G. australasiae

Binomial name
- Goniaea australasiae (W.E. Leach, 1814)

Synonyms
- Goniaea alta (Walker, 1870); Goniaea ampla Sjöstedt, 1921; Goniaea arcuata Tepper, 1896; Goniaea cinnamomea (Serville, 1838); Goniaea distincta Brancsik, 1896; Goniaea fusca Tepper, 1896; Goniaea gallina Sjöstedt, 1921; Goniaea macronotum Sjöstedt, 1921; Goniaea marginalis Sjöstedt, 1930; Goniaea miniata Sjöstedt, 1921; Goniaea nigropunctata Brancsik, 1896; Goniaea roseipennis Sjöstedt, 1930; Goniaea rostrata Sjöstedt, 1936; Goniaea sanguinipennis Sjöstedt, 1920; Gryllus australasiae Leach, 1814

= Goniaea australasiae =

Species of grasshopper

Goniaea australasiae is a species of grasshopper in the family Acrididae.

Experiments have been carried out with G. australasiae to study the time of genetic recombination in relation to the sequence of stages in meiosis, the relationship of chiasmata to crossing over, and the mechanism of recombination. Combined cytological and autoradiographic analyses of meiosis showed that crossing over is achieved by breakage and exchange of segments of nonsister, homologous chromatids, and each such exchange event results in the formation of a cytologically visible chiasma. The meiotic stage at which this form of recombination takes place has been identified as "early pachytene," and it is well removed from premeiotic chromosome duplication.
