= Autoradiograph =

Radiograph made by recording radiation emitted by samples on photographic plates

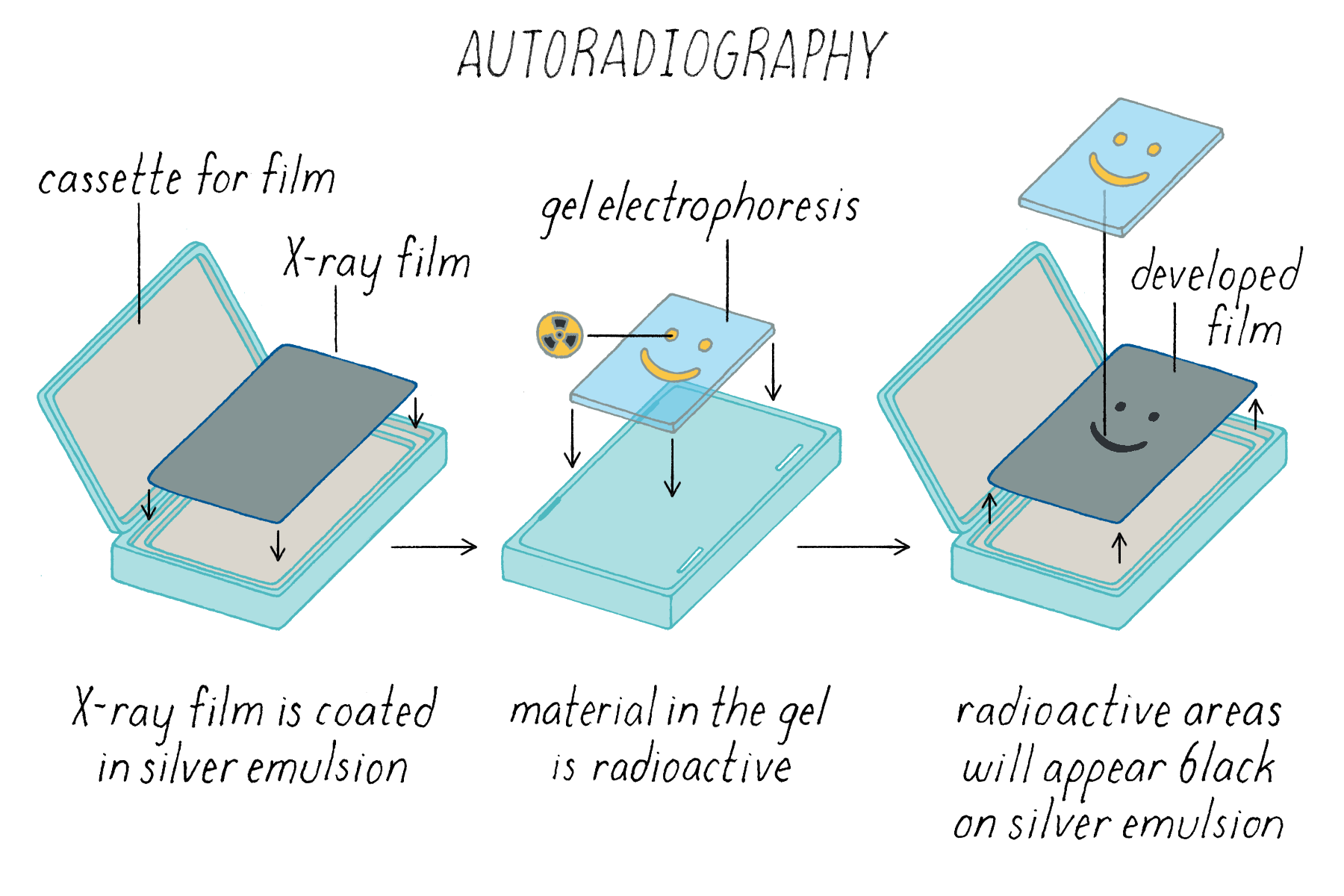
X-ray film can be used to visualize molecules that have been radioactively labeled. The decay emissions of the radioactively labeled molecule react with the X-ray film’s silver (Ag) emulsion, allowing detection of the labeled molecule when the X-ray film is developed.

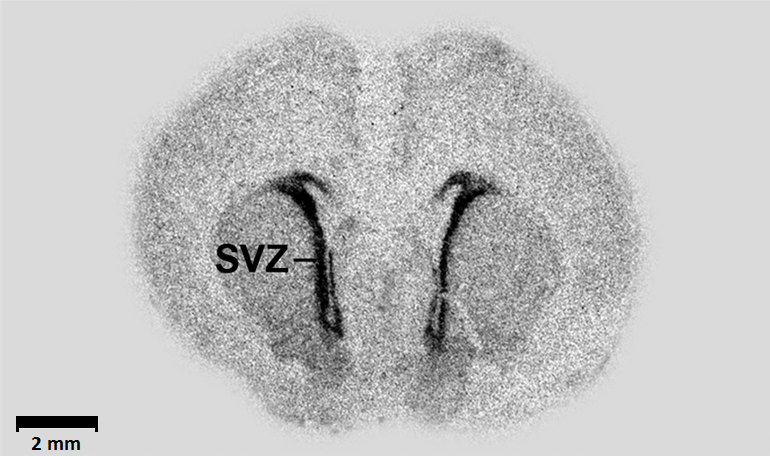
Autoradiography of a coronal brain slice, taken from an embryonal rat. GAD67-binding marker is highly expressed in the subventricular zone.

An autoradiograph is an image on an X-ray film or nuclear emulsion produced by the pattern of decay emissions (e.g., beta particles or gamma rays) from a distribution of a radioactive substance. Alternatively, the autoradiograph is also available as a digital image (digital autoradiography), due to the recent development of scintillation gas detectors or rare-earth phosphorimaging systems. The film or emulsion is apposed to the labeled tissue section to obtain the autoradiograph (also called an autoradiogram). The auto- prefix indicates that the radioactive substance is within the sample, as distinguished from the case of historadiography or microradiography, in which the sample is marked using an external source. Some autoradiographs can be examined microscopically for localization of silver grains (such as on the interiors or exteriors of cells or organelles) in which the process is termed micro-autoradiography. For example, micro-autoradiography was used to examine whether atrazine was being metabolized by the hornwort plant or by epiphytic microorganisms in the biofilm layer surrounding the plant.

== Applications ==
In biology, this technique may be used to determine the tissue (or cell) localization of a radioactive substance, either introduced into a metabolic pathway, bound to a receptor or enzyme, or hybridized to a nucleic acid. Applications for autoradiography are broad, ranging from biomedical to environmental sciences to industry.

=== Receptor autoradiography ===
The use of radiolabeled ligands to determine the tissue distributions of receptors is termed either in vivo or in vitro receptor autoradiography if the ligand is administered into the circulation (with subsequent tissue removal and sectioning) or applied to the tissue sections, respectively. Once the receptor density is known, in vitro autoradiography can also be used to determine the anatomical distribution and affinity of a radiolabeled drug towards the receptor. For in vitro autoradiography, radioligand was directly applying on frozen tissue sections without administration to the subject. Thus it cannot follow the distribution, metabolism and degradation situation completely in the living body. But because target in the cryosections is widely exposed and can direct contact with radioligand, in vitro autoradiography is still a quick and easy method to screen drug candidates, PET and SPECT ligands. The ligands are generally labeled with ^{3}H (tritium), ^{18}F (fluorine-18), ^{11}C (carbon-11) or ^{125}I (radioiodine). Compare to in vitro, ex vivo autoradiography were performed after administration of radioligand in the body, which can decrease the artifacts and are closer to the inner environment.

The distribution of RNA transcripts in tissue sections by the use of radiolabeled, complementary oligonucleotides or ribonucleic acids ("riboprobes") is called in situ hybridization histochemistry. Radioactive precursors of DNA and RNA, [^{3}H]-thymidine and [^{3}H]-uridine respectively, may be introduced to living cells to determine the timing of several phases of the cell cycle. RNA or DNA viral sequences can also be located in this fashion. These probes are usually labeled with ^{32}P, ^{33}P, or ^{35}S. In the realm of behavioral endocrinology, autoradiography can be used to determine hormonal uptake and indicate receptor location; an animal can be injected with a radiolabeled hormone, or the study can be conducted in vitro.

=== Rate of DNA replication ===
The rate of DNA replication in a mouse cell growing in vitro was measured by autoradiography as 33 nucleotides per second. The rate of phage T4 DNA elongation in phage-infected E. coli was also measured by autoradiography as 749 nucleotides per second during the period of exponential DNA increase at 37 °C (99 °F).

=== Detection of protein phosphorylation ===
Phosphorylation means the posttranslational addition of a phosphate group to specific amino acids of proteins, and such modification can lead to a drastic change in the stability or the function of a protein in the cell. Protein phosphorylation can be detected on an autoradiograph, after incubating the protein in vitro with the appropriate kinase and γ-32P-ATP. The radiolabeled phosphate of latter is incorporated into the protein which is isolated via SDS-PAGE and visualized on an autoradiograph of the gel. (See figure 3. of a recent study showing that CREB-binding protein is phosphorylated by HIPK2.)

=== Detection of sugar movement in plant tissue ===
In plant physiology, autoradiography can be used to determine sugar accumulation in leaf tissue. Sugar accumulation, as it relates to autoradiography, can described the phloem-loading strategy used in a plant. For example, if sugars accumulate in the minor veins of a leaf, it is expected that the leaves have few plasmodesmatal connections which is indicative of apoplastic movement, or an active phloem-loading strategy. Sugars, such as sucrose, fructose, or mannitol, are radiolabeled with [14-C], and then absorbed into leaf tissue by simple diffusion. The leaf tissue is then exposed to autoradiographic film (or emulsion) to produce an image. Images will show distinct vein patterns if sugar accumulation is concentrated in leaf veins (apoplastic movement), or images will show a static-like pattern if sugar accumulation is uniform throughout the leaf (symplastic movement).

=== Other techniques ===
This autoradiographic approach contrasts to techniques such as PET and SPECT where the exact 3-dimensional localization of the radiation source is provided by careful use of coincidence counting, gamma counters and other devices.

Krypton-85 is used to inspect aircraft components for small defects. Krypton-85 is allowed to penetrate small cracks, and then its presence is detected by autoradiography. The method is called "krypton gas penetrant imaging". The gas penetrates smaller openings than the liquids used in dye penetrant inspection and fluorescent penetrant inspection.

== Historical events ==
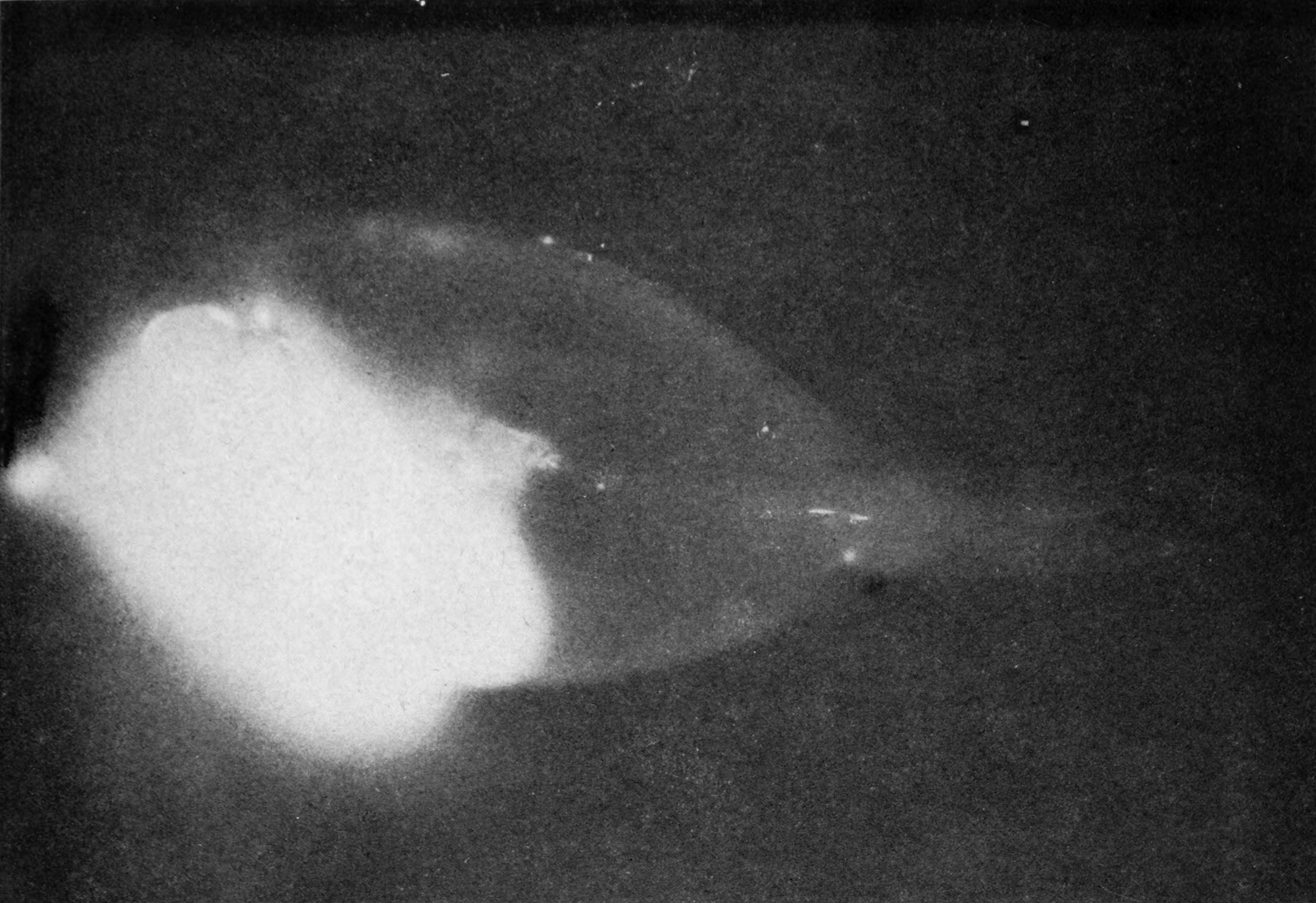
A radioactive surgeonfish makes its own X-ray. The bright area is a meal of fresh algae. The rest of the body has absorbed and distributed enough plutonium to make the scales radioactive. The fish was alive and apparently healthy when captured.

The task of radioactive decontamination following the Baker nuclear test at Bikini Atoll during Operation Crossroads in 1946 was far more difficult than the U.S. Navy had prepared for. Though the task's futility became apparent and the danger to cleanup crews mounted, Colonel Stafford Warren, in charge of radiation safety, had difficulty persuading Vice Admiral William H. P. Blandy to abandon the cleanup and with it the surviving target ships. On August 10, Warren showed Blandy an autoradiograph made by a surgeonfish from the lagoon that was left on a photographic plate overnight. The film was exposed by alpha radiation produced from the fish's scales, evidence that plutonium, mimicking calcium, had been distributed throughout the fish. Blandy promptly ordered that all further decontamination work be discontinued. Warren wrote home, "A self X ray of a fish ... did the trick."
