= Goniaea angustipennis =

Scientific classification
- Domain: Eukaryota
- Kingdom: Animalia
- Phylum: Arthropoda
- Class: Insecta
- Order: Orthoptera
- Suborder: Caelifera
- Family: Acrididae
- Genus: Goniaea
- Species: G. angustipennis

Binomial name
- Goniaea angustipennis B.Y.Sjöstedt 1920

Species of grasshopper

Goniaea angustipennis is a species of grasshopper in the family Acrididae.
