= Historadiography =

Histological technique

Historadiography is a technique formerly utilized in the fields of histology and cellular biology to provide semiquantitative information regarding the density of a tissue sample. It is usually synonymous with microradiography. This is achieved by layering a ground section of mineralized tissue (such as bone) with photographic emulsion on a glass slide and exposing the sample to a beam of X-rays. After developing the emulsion, the resulting radiograph can be viewed with a microscope. A side-by-side comparison with a slide containing radiographs of various substances of known mass can provide a rough mass estimate, and therefore a rough approximation of the concentration of calcium salts in the sample.

Historadiography has also been used to visualize staining of tissue, such as spinal cord samples with thorotrast, which contains thorium that is opaque to X-rays.

Over recent decades researchers have generally lost interest in historadiography. The most recent publication using the term (1998) to be indexed in PubMed referred to autoradiography of tritium incorporated in thymidine.
