= Glaphyromorphus =

Scientific classification
- Kingdom: Animalia
- Phylum: Chordata
- Class: Reptilia
- Order: Squamata
- Family: Scincidae
- Subfamily: Sphenomorphinae
- Genus: Glaphyromorphus; Wells & Wellington, 1984

Genus of lizards

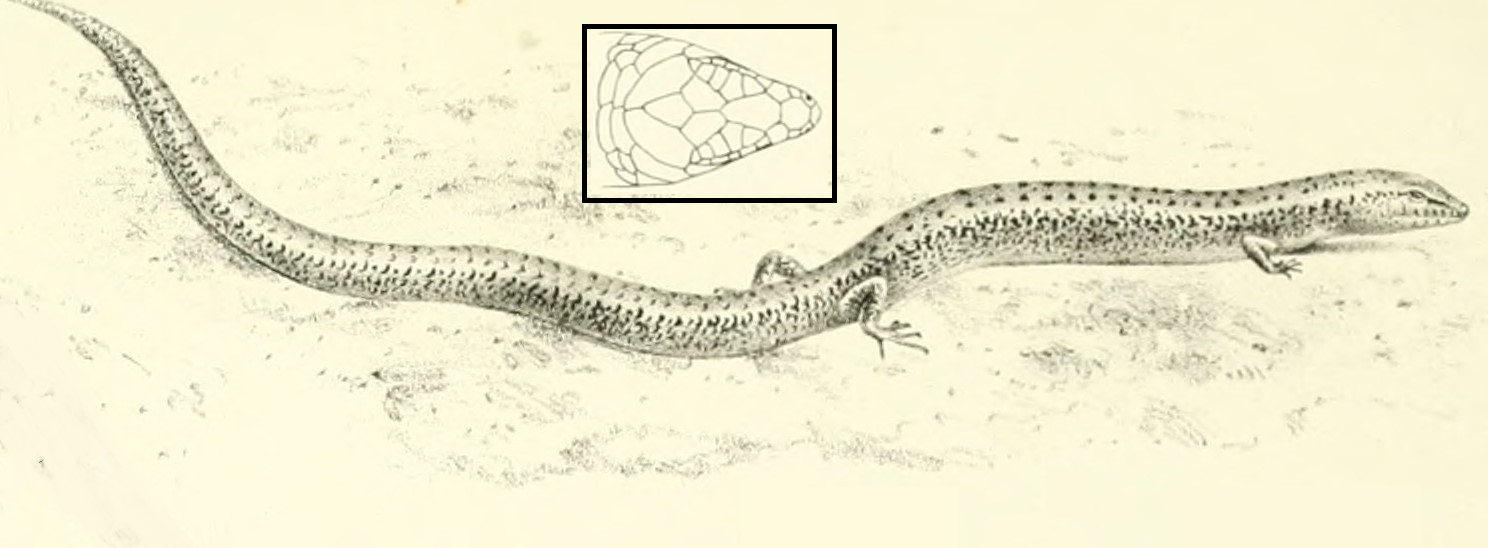
An 1880s illustration of Glaphyromorphus pumilus

Glaphyromorphus is a genus of lizards in the skink family (Scincidae).

== Geographic range ==
Species in the genus Glaphyromorphus are found in Australia and New Guinea.

== Species ==
The following 12 species are recognized:

- Glaphyromorphus arnhemicus (Storr, 1967)
- Glaphyromorphus clandestinus Hoskin & Couper, 2004 – Mount Elliot mulch-skink
- Glaphyromorphus cracens (Greer, 1985) – slender mulch-skink
- Glaphyromorphus crassicauda (A.M.C. Duméril & A.H.A. Duméril, 1851) – Cape York mulch-skink
- Glaphyromorphus darwiniensis (Storr, 1967) – Darwin's ground skink, northern mulch-skink
- Glaphyromorphus fuscicaudis (Greer, 1979) – brown-tailed bar-lipped skink, grey-tailed skink
- Glaphyromorphus mjobergi (Lönnberg & Andersson, 1915) – Atherton Tableland skink
- Glaphyromorphus nigricaudis (Macleay, 1877) – black-tailed bar-lipped skink
- Glaphyromorphus nyanchupinta Hoskin & Couper, 2014 – McIlwraith bar-lipped skink
- Glaphyromorphus othelarrni Hoskin & Couper, 2014 – Cape Melville bar-lipped skink
- Glaphyromorphus pumilus (Boulenger, 1887) – dwarf mulch-skink
- Glaphyromorphus punctulatus (W. Peters, 1871) – fine-spotted mulch-skink

Nota bene: A binomial authority in parentheses indicates that the species was originally described in a genus other than Glaphyromorphus.
