= Thorotrast =

Contrast agent for imaging, no longer used clinically

Thorotrast is a suspension containing particles of the radioactive compound thorium dioxide, ThO_{2}; it was used as a radiocontrast agent in clinical radiography in the 1930s to 1950s. It is no longer used clinically.

Thorium compounds produce excellent images because of thorium's high opacity to X-rays (it has a high cross section for absorption). However, thorium is retained in the body, and it is radioactive, emitting harmful alpha radiation as it decays. Because the suspension offered high image quality and had virtually no immediate side-effects compared to the alternatives available at the time, Thorotrast became widely used after its introduction in 1931. António Egas Moniz contributed to its development. About 2 to 10 million patients worldwide have been treated with Thorotrast. However, today it has shown to increase risk of certain cancers, such as hepatic angiosarcoma, and fibrosis of the liver.

== Safety ==
Even at the time of introduction, there was concern about the safety of Thorotrast. Following injection, the drug is distributed to the liver, spleen, lymph nodes, and bone, where it is absorbed. After this initial absorption, redistribution takes place at a very slow pace. Specifically, the biological half-life is estimated to be 22 years. This means that the organs of patients who have been given Thorotrast will be exposed to internal alpha radiation for the rest of their lives. The significance of this long-term exposure was not fully understood at the time of Thorotrast's introduction in 1931.

Thorotrast has significant effects in the liver due to its hepatic accumulation. It is linked to the development of liver fibrosis, liver cancer and peliosis hepatis.

Due to the release of alpha particles, Thorotrast was found to be extremely carcinogenic. There is a high over-incidence of various cancers in patients who have been treated with Thorotrast. The cancers occur some years (usually 20–30) after injection of Thorotrast. The risk of developing liver cancer (or bile duct cancer) in former Thorotrast patients has been measured to be well above 100 times the risk of the rest of the population. The risk of leukemia appears to be 20 times higher in Thorotrast patients. Thorotrast exposure has also been associated with the development of angiosarcoma.

German patients exposed to Thorotrast had their median life-expectancy shortened by 14 years in comparison to a similar non-exposed control group. Epidemiological studies from Portugal where Thorotrast was in use between 1930 and 1955 showed that the link between it and the risk of developing leukaemia was significant, and went so far as describing Thorotrast as the most potent leukaemogen reported. The studies also noted very high levels of haemangioendotheliomas typically of the liver and that they were very rarely seen in controls.

Thorium is no longer used in clinical X-ray studies. Today, hydrophilic (water-soluble) iodinated contrast agents, which are not radioactive, are universally used when intravenous contrast is needed in clinical X-ray procedures.

The Danish director Nils Malmros's movie, Facing the Truth (original Danish title At Kende Sandheden) from 2002, portrays the dilemma that faced Malmros's father, Richard Malmros, when treating his patients in the 1940s. Richard Malmros was deeply concerned about the persistence of Thorotrast in the body but was forced to use Thorotrast, because the only available alternative (per-abrodil) had serious immediate side-effects, suffered from image quality problems and was difficult to obtain during the Second World War. The use of Thorotrast in Denmark ended in 1947 when safer alternatives became available.

== Current use ==
In the decades after the cessation of its clinical use, Thorotrast has sometimes been used in laboratory research to stain neural tissue samples for examination by historadiography.
