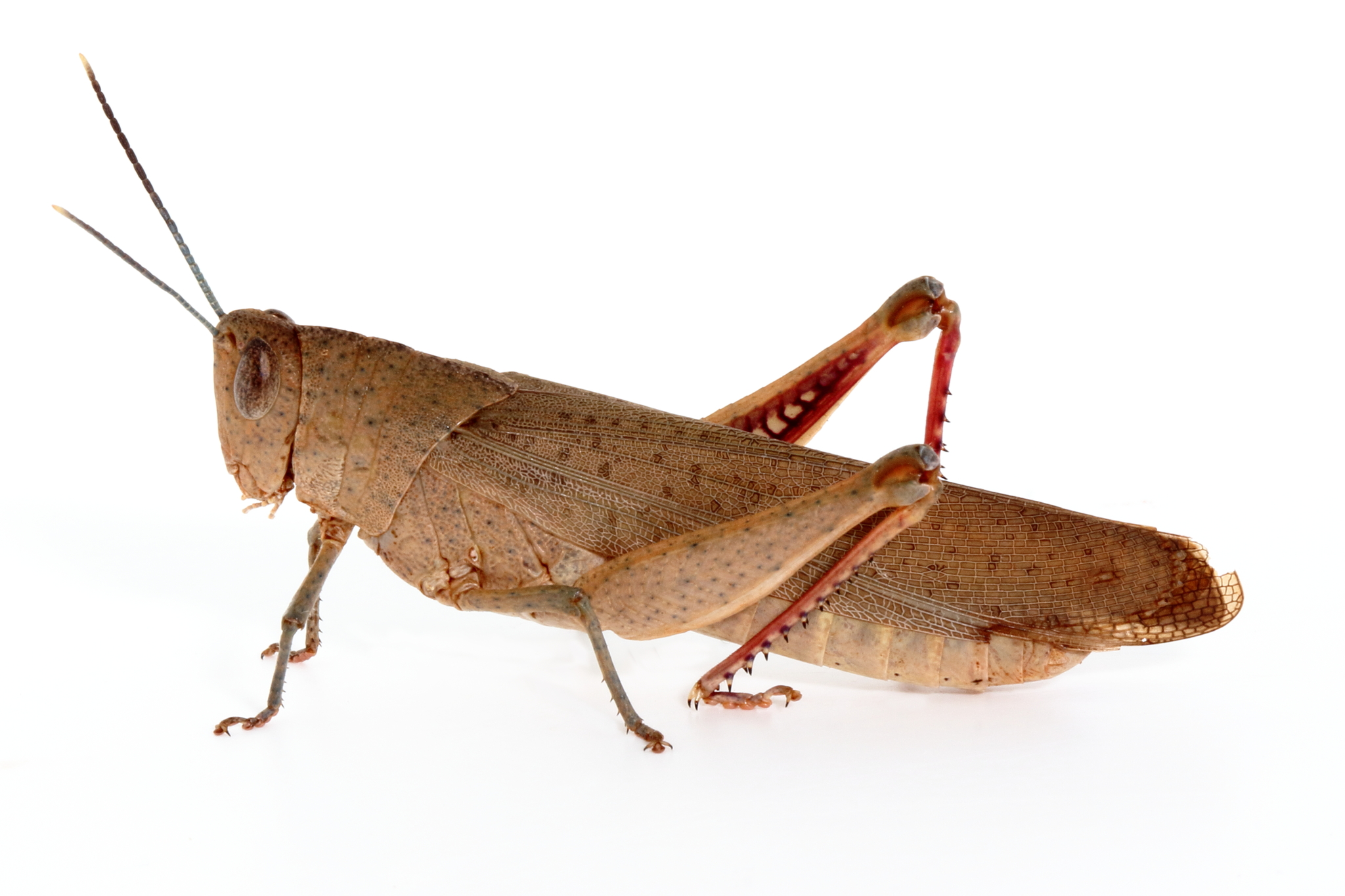

Scientific classification
- Kingdom: Animalia
- Phylum: Arthropoda
- Class: Insecta
- Order: Orthoptera
- Suborder: Caelifera
- Family: Acrididae
- Genus: Goniaea
- Species: G. carinata

Binomial name
- Goniaea carinata Carl Stål, 1878

Synonyms
- G. coeruleipes Sjöstedt, 1920 G. luteipes Sjöstedt, 1921; G. parva Sjöstedt, 1920

= Goniaea carinata =

Species of grasshopper

Goniaea carinata is a species of grasshopper in the family Acrididae.
