= Goniaea ensicornis =

Scientific classification
- Domain: Eukaryota
- Kingdom: Animalia
- Phylum: Arthropoda
- Class: Insecta
- Order: Orthoptera
- Suborder: Caelifera
- Family: Acrididae
- Genus: Goniaea
- Species: G. ensicornis

Binomial name
- Goniaea ensicornis Carl Stål, 1878

Species of grasshopper

Goniaea ensicornis is a species of grasshopper in the family Acrididae.
