= Glaphyromorphus arnhemicus =

Conservation status
- Least Concern (IUCN 3.1)

Scientific classification
- Kingdom: Animalia
- Phylum: Chordata
- Class: Reptilia
- Order: Squamata
- Family: Scincidae
- Genus: Glaphyromorphus
- Species: G. arnhemicus

Binomial name
- Glaphyromorphus arnhemicus (Storr, 1967)

Species of lizard

Glaphyromorphus arnhemicus is a species of skink found in the Northern Territory.
