= Eric Mjöberg =

Swedish zoologist and ethnographer

Eric Georg Mjöberg
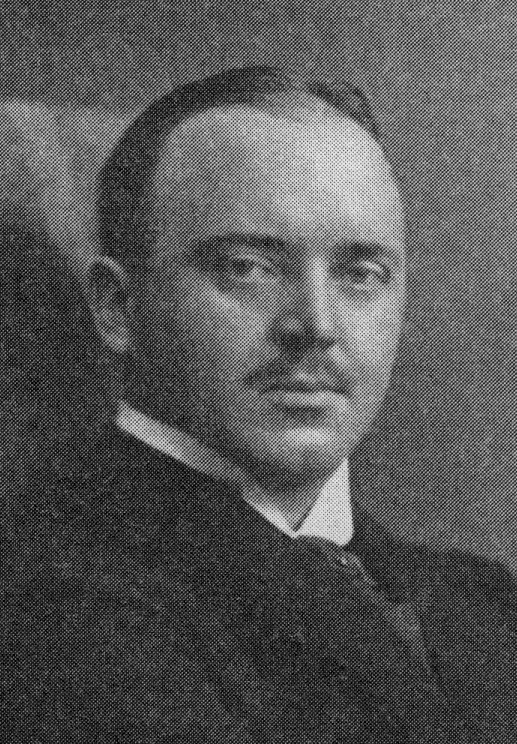
- Eric Mjöberg around 1920
- Born: Halland County, Sweden
- Occupation: Zoologist

Eric Georg Mjöberg (6 August 1882 – 8 July 1938) was a Swedish zoologist and ethnographer who led the first Swedish scientific expeditions to Australia in the early 1900s, and worked in Indonesia. The plant Vaccinium mjoebergii J.J.Sm. was named after him, as were Mjoberg's toadlet (Uperoleia mjobergii ), the grasshopper Goniaea mjoebergi, the crab Austruca mjoebergi, Mjöberg's forest dragon (Gonocephalus mjobergi ), the Atherton Tableland skink (Glaphyromorphus mjobergi ), Mjöberg's bush frog (Philautus mjobergi ), Arthrorhabdus mjöbergi (a centipede which he collected), Mjöberg's dwarf litter frog (Leptobrachella mjobergi ), and the water beetle Neobidessodes mjobergi.

== Early life and education ==
Mjöberg was born in Ås, Halland County, Sweden. He gained a licentiate at the Stockholm University in 1908, and his doctorate at Lund University in 1912.

== Work ==
Mjöberg led expeditions to North West Australia in 1910/11, and to Queensland in 1912/13. He worked for the Deli Experimental Station at Medan in Sumatra from 1919 to 1922, and was curator of the Sarawak State Museum in Borneo from 1922 until 1924. He also worked in various museums in Sweden.

He was employed by the State Entomological Institution from 1903 to 1906 and at the National Museum at different times between 1903 and 1910 during which time he was a master at several higher schools in Stockholm from 1907 until 1909, and travelled in Sweden for study purposes through 1902 to 1909 before he led expeditions to Australia. A lecture tour in the USA lasted from 1916 to 1917 after which he was Swedish consul in Sumatra in 1920 among other postings and a study period in the US from 1921 to 1925.

== Australian expeditions ==
In the early 1900s Mjöberg set off to the Kimberley region of Western Australia in an attempt to prove his Darwinian human evolution theory. What he did not know was that his expedition would have dire repercussions for years to follow for indigenous Australians, and for himself. In Western Australia, Mjöberg became obsessed with the Aboriginal people, and what started off as collecting native flora and fauna for research, soon led to the desecration of sacred burial grounds and the smuggling of human remains back to Sweden.

Historians have described Mjöberg as aggressive, arrogant and devious, a leader who made enemies with local Aboriginal people, pastoralists and even his own scientific team.

In 1912-1913, he made a second expedition to Australia's east coast: Queensland, New South Wales and Victoria, removing one set of remains from each.

== Controversy ==
The 1915 publication of his diaries about the 1910 expedition exposed his unethical and illegal collection of material from Australia. Most of the material kept in Sweden's Museum of Ethnography was brought there between 1910 and 1911. Swedish anthropologist Claes Hallgren of Dalarna University wrote the book Two Travellers – Two Pictures of Australia, examining Mjoberg's methods, prompting an ethical debate that led the Swedish Government to contact the Australian authorities. Ninety years after their removal, his great-niece Lotte Mjöberg, a journalist in Stockholm, initiated the return of skeletons to the Aboriginal people in September 2004. Aboriginal elders travelled to Stockholm to receive the remains and start the process of spiritual healing. Spokesman for the Kimberley Aboriginal Law and Culture Centre, Neil Carter said: "The belief is that once a burial ground has been disturbed, the spirits and the country will not rest until the remains have been brought back." Aborigines believe that the spirit of the departed cannot go on into the afterlife if the bones are disturbed. Eighteen boxes containing bones, believed to include the skeletons of two small children, were sent to the National Museum of Australia for identification before being interred at their traditional lands.

Taking them without permission, Mjöberg passed them off as kangaroo bones to get them out of the country. His attitude was representative of the Social Darwinism of the times according to Dr Hallgren, who writes that the popular "Gothic Horror" presentation, and demonising Aborigines was the context and "justification" for Mjöberg's hunting for skeletons. It was designed to impress his audience of his work as an adventurer.

== Personal life ==
Mjöberg was married to the dentist Ingeborg Esther Hellichius (1883-1962) between 1909 and 1913. From 1918, he was married to Anna Valborg Dagny Aagaard-Gieseke (1886-1977).

== Decline ==
Mjöberg died in poverty in Stockholm after a long, undiagnosed illness during which he had constant nightmares reflecting his experiences in the Kimberleys, including a sense of being pursued by Aboriginal people and contact with the Wondjina – creation spirits of the Dreamtime. During this time he was forced to sell part of his collection. Despite his ill health he managed to write an account of this experience (On the wings of poison: peculiar experiences during a medicine poisoning, 1934).

In the Australian documentary Dark Science, an elder explains that the spirits give intruders a hard time, making them sick, but that Aboriginal people know ways to forestall these effects, and that outsiders do not.

== Publications ==
As well as numerous contributions to the scientific literature, he wrote:

- Bland vilda djur och folk i Australien, his travel account, Bonnier, Stockholm, 1915. Translated as Among Wild Animals and People in Australia by Margareta Luotsinen and Kim Akerman, Hesperland Press, 2012 ISBN 978-0-85905-507-9
- Mjöberg, E. G. (1930). Forest Life and Adventures in the Malay Archipelago. Allen & Unwin: London.
