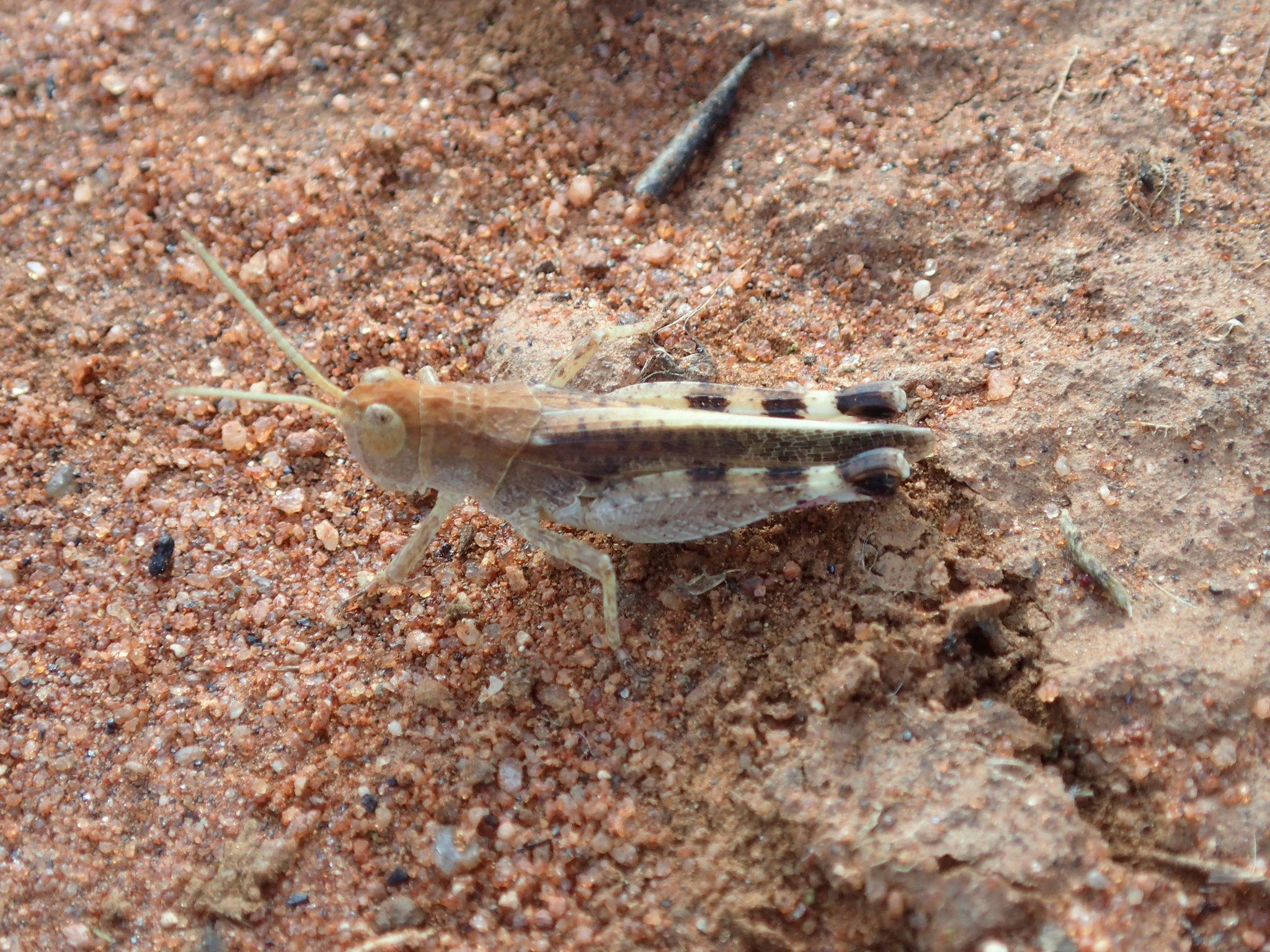
- Desertaria lepida

Scientific classification
- Kingdom: Animalia
- Phylum: Arthropoda
- Clade: Pancrustacea
- Class: Insecta
- Order: Orthoptera
- Suborder: Caelifera
- Family: Acrididae
- Tribe: Catantopini
- Subtribe: Peakesiina
- Genus: Desertaria; Sjöstedt, 1920

= Desertaria =

Genus of insects

Desertaria is a genus of grasshoppers, with species found in Australia.

== Species ==
Three species are recognized in this genus:

- Desertaria fasciata Sjöstedt, 1920
- Desertaria flamma Sjöstedt, 1921
- Desertaria lepida (Walker, 1870) - type species (as Desertaria cinnamomea Sjöstedt 1920)
