= Glaphyromorphus crassicauda =

Conservation status
- Least Concern (IUCN 3.1)

Scientific classification
- Kingdom: Animalia
- Phylum: Chordata
- Class: Reptilia
- Order: Squamata
- Suborder: Scinciformata
- Infraorder: Scincomorpha
- Family: Sphenomorphidae
- Genus: Glaphyromorphus
- Species: G. crassicauda

Binomial name
- Glaphyromorphus crassicauda (Duméril & Duméril, 1851)
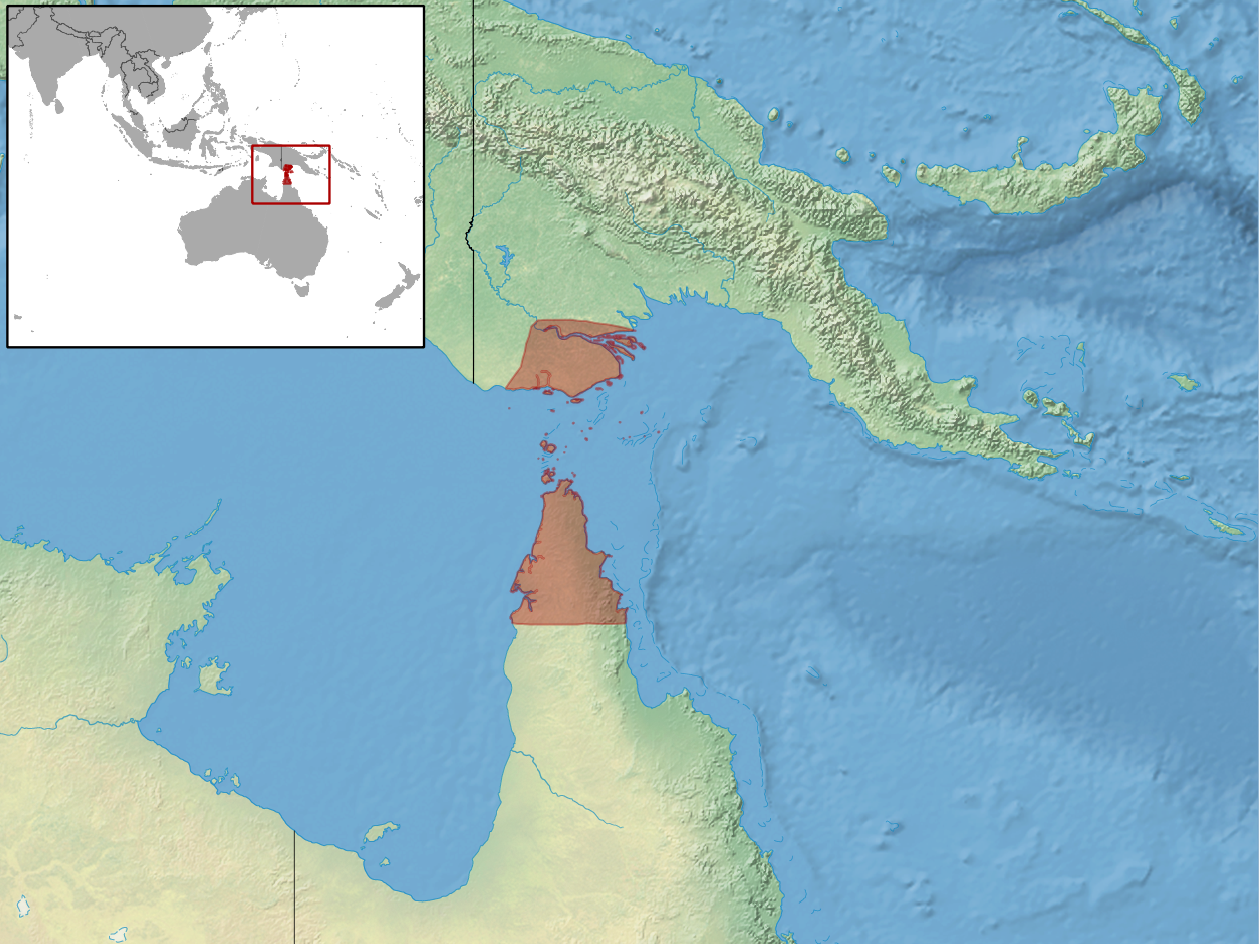

Species of lizard

The Cape York mulch-skink (Glaphyromorphus crassicauda) is a species of skink found in Queensland in Australia.
