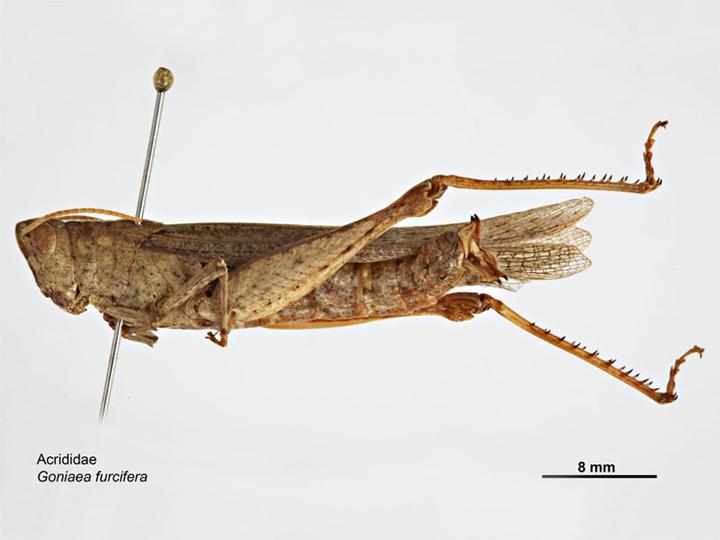

Scientific classification
- Kingdom: Animalia
- Phylum: Arthropoda
- Class: Insecta
- Order: Orthoptera
- Suborder: Caelifera
- Family: Acrididae
- Genus: Goniaea
- Species: G. furcifera

Binomial name
- Goniaea furcifera Walker, 1870

= Goniaea furcifera =

Species of grasshopper

Goniaea furcifera is a species of grasshopper in the family Acrididae. It was described by Francis Walker in 1870.

== Synonyms ==
The following are synonyms for this species:

- Goniaea minipes Sjöstedt, 1920
- Goniaea tristis (Sjöstedt, 1921)
