= Glaphyromorphus darwiniensis =

Conservation status
- Least Concern (IUCN 3.1)

Scientific classification
- Kingdom: Animalia
- Phylum: Chordata
- Class: Reptilia
- Order: Squamata
- Family: Scincidae
- Genus: Glaphyromorphus
- Species: G. darwiniensis

Binomial name
- Glaphyromorphus darwiniensis (Storr, 1967)

Synonyms
- Sphenomorphus crassicaudus darwiniensis Storr, 1967; Sphenomorphus darwiniensis — Greer, 1990; Glaphyromorphus darwiniensis — Cogger, 2000

Species of lizard

Glaphyromorphus darwiniensis, also known commonly as Darwin's ground skink and the northern mulch-skink, is a species of lizard in the family Scincidae. The species is endemic to Australia.

== Etymology ==
The specific name, darwiniensis, refers to the city of Darwin, Northern Territory, Australia.

== Geographic range ==
G. darwiniensis is found in Northern Territory and Western Australia.

== Habitat ==
The preferred natural habitat of G. darwiniensis is forest.

== Behavior ==
G. darwiniensis is terrestrial and fossorial.

== Reproduction ==
G. darwiniensis is oviparous.
