= Gonocephalus mjobergi =

Conservation status
- Data Deficient (IUCN 3.1)

Scientific classification
- Kingdom: Animalia
- Phylum: Chordata
- Class: Reptilia
- Order: Squamata
- Suborder: Iguania
- Family: Agamidae
- Genus: Gonocephalus
- Species: G. mjobergi

Binomial name
- Gonocephalus mjobergi M.A. Smith, 1925

Synonyms
- Gonocephalus mjöbergi M.A. Smith, 1925; Gonocephalus mjoebergi M.A. Smith, 1925

Species of lizard

Gonocephalus mjobergi is a species of lizard in the subfamily Draconinae of the family Agamidae. The species is native to Indonesia and Malaysia.

== Etymology ==
The specific name, mjobergi is in honor of Swedish zoologist Eric Georg Mjöberg.

== Habitat ==
The preferred natural habitat of Gonocephalus mjobergi is forest, at elevations of 2,134–2,250 m (7,000–7,380 ft).

== Behavior ==
Gonocephalus mjobergi is arboreal and diurnal.

== Diet ==
Gonocephalus mjobergi preys upon insects.

== Reproduction ==
Gonocephalus mjobergi is oviparous.
