= Glaphyromorphus pumilus =

Conservation status
- Least Concern (IUCN 3.1)

Scientific classification
- Kingdom: Animalia
- Phylum: Chordata
- Class: Reptilia
- Order: Squamata
- Family: Scincidae
- Genus: Glaphyromorphus
- Species: G. pumilus

Binomial name
- Glaphyromorphus pumilus (Boulenger, 1887)

Species of lizard

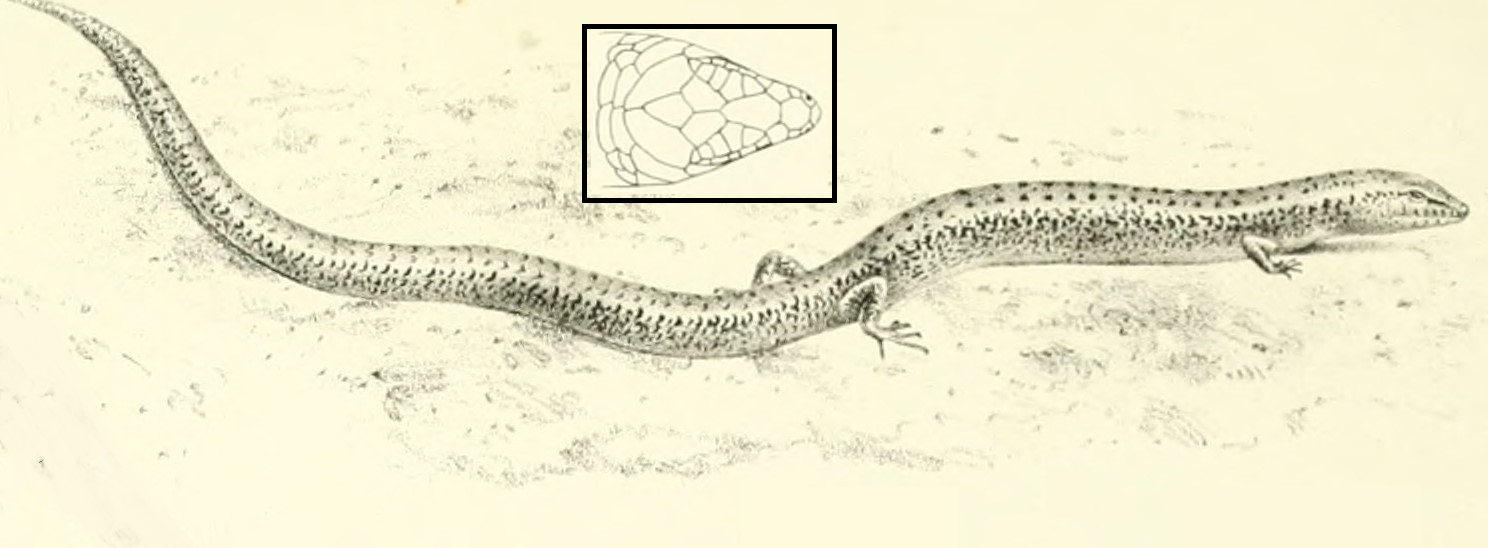
Glaphyromorphus pumilus

The dwarf mulch-skink (Glaphyromorphus pumilus) is a species of skink found in Queensland in Australia.
