= Glaphyromorphus clandestinus =

Conservation status
- Least Concern (IUCN 3.1)

Scientific classification
- Kingdom: Animalia
- Phylum: Chordata
- Class: Reptilia
- Order: Squamata
- Suborder: Scinciformata
- Infraorder: Scincomorpha
- Family: Sphenomorphidae
- Genus: Glaphyromorphus
- Species: G. clandestinus

Binomial name
- Glaphyromorphus clandestinus Hoskin & Couper, 2004

Species of lizard

The Mount Elliot mulch-skink (Glaphyromorphus clandestinus) is a species of skink found in Queensland in Australia.
