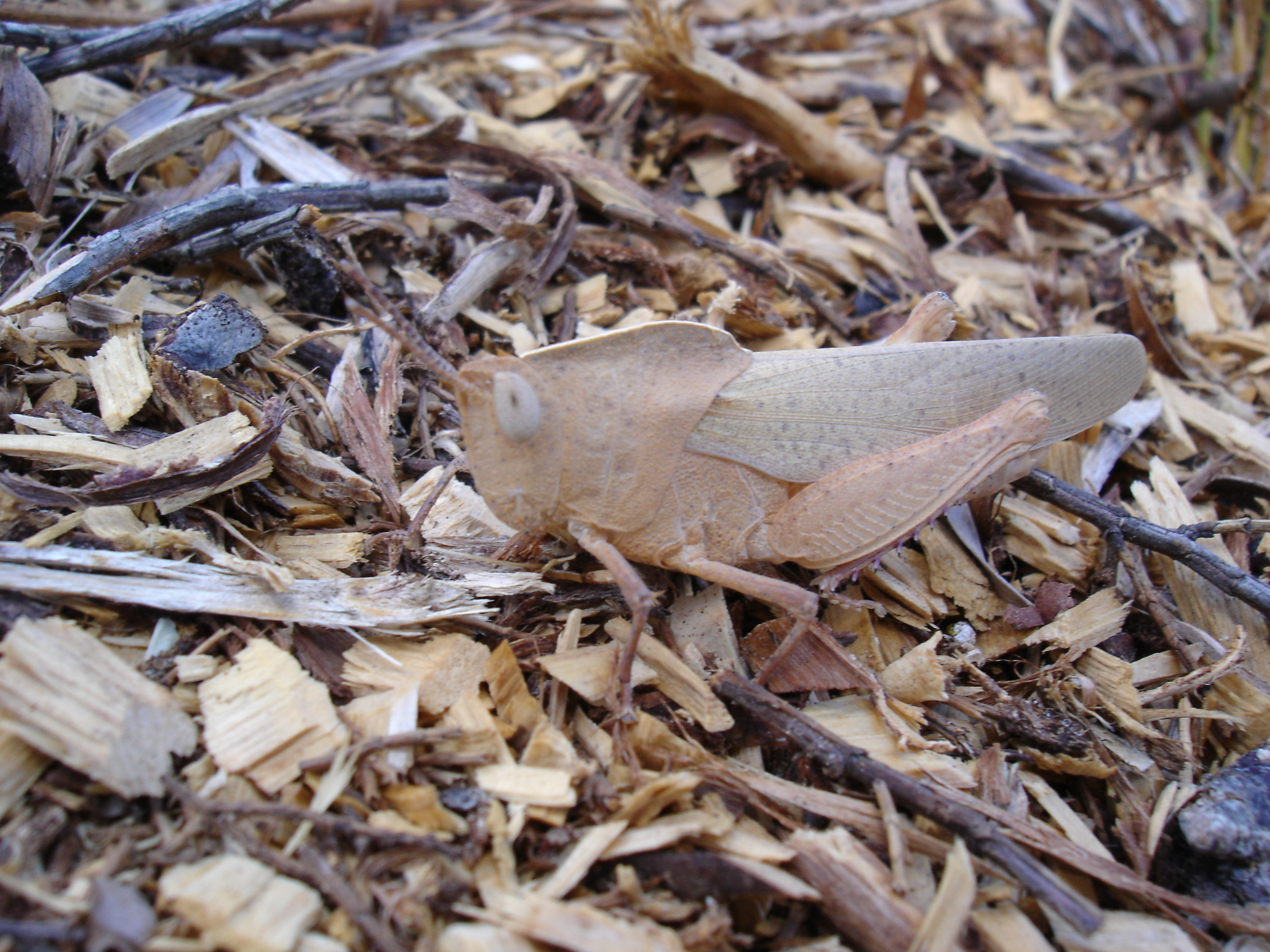
- Goniaea sp.

Scientific classification
- Domain: Eukaryota
- Kingdom: Animalia
- Phylum: Arthropoda
- Class: Insecta
- Order: Orthoptera
- Suborder: Caelifera
- Family: Acrididae
- Subfamily: Catantopinae
- Tribe: Catantopini
- Subtribe: Goniaeina
- Genus: Goniaea; Stål, 1873

= Goniaea =

Genus of grasshoppers

Goniaea is a genus of grasshoppers in the tribe Catantopini from Australia.

== Species ==
- Goniaea angustipennis
- Goniaea australasiae
- Goniaea carinata
- Goniaea ensicornis
- Goniaea furcifera
- Goniaea opomaloides - type species (as Goniaea rugulosa Stål)
- Goniaea vocans
