= Glaphyromorphus nigricaudis =

Conservation status
- Least Concern (IUCN 3.1)

Scientific classification
- Kingdom: Animalia
- Phylum: Chordata
- Class: Reptilia
- Order: Squamata
- Suborder: Scinciformata
- Infraorder: Scincomorpha
- Family: Sphenomorphidae
- Genus: Glaphyromorphus
- Species: G. nigricaudis

Binomial name
- Glaphyromorphus nigricaudis (Macleay, 1877)

Species of reptile

The black-tailed bar-lipped skink (Glaphyromorphus nigricaudis) is a species of skink found in Northern Territory and Queensland in Australia, Papua New Guinea and Indonesia.
