= Glaphyromorphus cracens =

Conservation status
- Least Concern (IUCN 3.1)

Scientific classification
- Kingdom: Animalia
- Phylum: Chordata
- Class: Reptilia
- Order: Squamata
- Suborder: Scinciformata
- Infraorder: Scincomorpha
- Family: Sphenomorphidae
- Genus: Glaphyromorphus
- Species: G. cracens

Binomial name
- Glaphyromorphus cracens (Greer, 1985)

Species of lizard

The slender mulch-skink (Glaphyromorphus cracens) is a species of skink found in Queensland in Australia.
