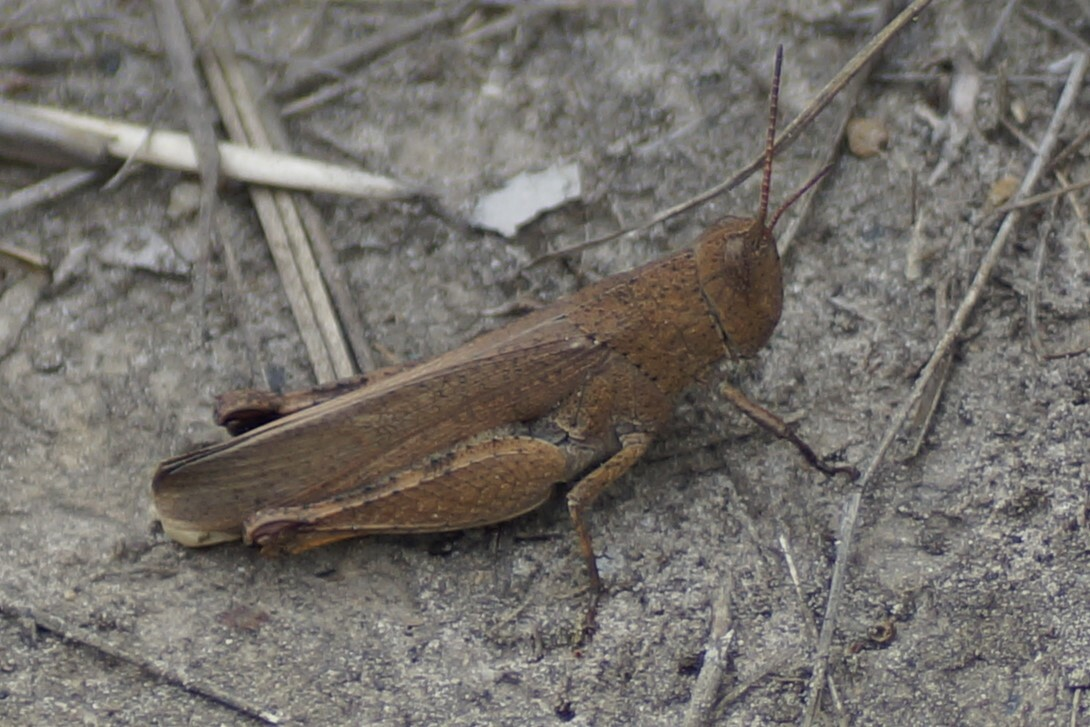
- Goniaea opomaloides, Australia

Scientific classification
- Kingdom: Animalia
- Phylum: Arthropoda
- Class: Insecta
- Order: Orthoptera
- Suborder: Caelifera
- Family: Acrididae
- Genus: Goniaea
- Species: G. opomaloides

Binomial name
- Goniaea opomaloides Walker, 1870

= Goniaea opomaloides =

Species of grasshopper

Goniaea opomaloides is a species of grasshopper in the family Acrididae. It was described by Francis Walker in 1870.

== Synonyms ==
The following are synonyms of this species:

- Goniaea fuscosparsa Sjöstedt, 1921
- Goniaea glaucipes Sjöstedt, 1921
- Goniaea latipennis Sjöstedt, 1921
- Goniaea obscura Sjöstedt, 1921
- Goniaea rugulosa Stål, 1873
- Goniaea vinaceipennis Sjöstedt, 1921
