= Glaphyromorphus mjobergi =

Conservation status
- Least Concern (IUCN 3.1)

Scientific classification
- Kingdom: Animalia
- Phylum: Chordata
- Class: Reptilia
- Order: Squamata
- Family: Scincidae
- Genus: Glaphyromorphus
- Species: G. mjobergi

Binomial name
- Glaphyromorphus mjobergi (Lönnberg & Andersson, 1915)

Synonyms
- Lygosoma mjobergi Lönnberg & Andersson, 1915; Sphenomorphus mjobergi (Lönnberg & Andersson, 1915); Lygosoma darlingtoni Loveridge, 1933

Species of lizard

The Atherton Tableland skink (Glaphyromorphus mjobergi), also known commonly as the Atherton Tableland mulch-skink, is a species of lizard in the subfamily Sphenomorphinae of the family Scincidae. The species is endemic to the Australian state of Queensland.

== Etymology ==
The specific name, mjobergi, is in honor of Swedish zoologist Eric Georg Mjöberg.

== Description ==
Glaphyromorphus mjobergi has five digits on each of its four feet.

The legs are short and widely separated on the elongate body. Dorsally, it is brown, with a series of cream or pale yellow blotches on the anterior flanks. Adults usually have a snout-to-vent length (SVL) of about 9 cm (3.5 in). The tail is long, about twice the SVL.

== Geographic distribution ==
Glaphyromorphus mjobergi is found in northern Queensland, on the Atherton Tablelands plateau.

== Habitat ==
The preferred natural habitat of Glaphyromorphus mjobergi is forest, at elevations above 650 m (2,130 ft).

== Behavior ==
Glaphyromorphus mjobergi is terrestrial, sheltering under leaf litter, fallen logs, and stones.

== Reproduction ==
Glaphyromorphus mjobergi is oviparous. Females reach sexual maturity at a snout-to-vent length (SVL) of 8 cm (3.1 in).
