= Glaphyromorphus punctulatus =

Conservation status
- Least Concern (IUCN 3.1)

Scientific classification
- Kingdom: Animalia
- Phylum: Chordata
- Class: Reptilia
- Order: Squamata
- Suborder: Scinciformata
- Infraorder: Scincomorpha
- Family: Sphenomorphidae
- Genus: Glaphyromorphus
- Species: G. punctulatus

Binomial name
- Glaphyromorphus punctulatus (Peters, 1871)

Species of lizard

The fine-spotted mulch-skink (Glaphyromorphus punctulatus) is a species of skink found in Queensland in Australia.
