= Glaphyromorphus fuscicaudis =

Conservation status
- Least Concern (IUCN 3.1)

Scientific classification
- Kingdom: Animalia
- Phylum: Chordata
- Class: Reptilia
- Order: Squamata
- Suborder: Scinciformata
- Infraorder: Scincomorpha
- Family: Sphenomorphidae
- Genus: Glaphyromorphus
- Species: G. fuscicaudis

Binomial name
- Glaphyromorphus fuscicaudis (Greer, 1979)

Species of lizard

The brown-tailed bar-lipped skink or grey-tailed skink (Glaphyromorphus fuscicaudis) is a species of skink found in Queensland in Australia.
