= Vinyl chloride =

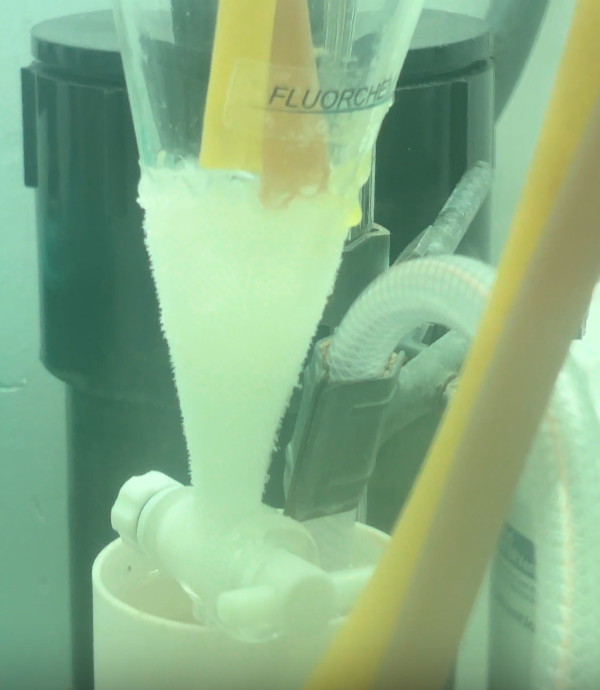

Structural formula of vinyl chloride
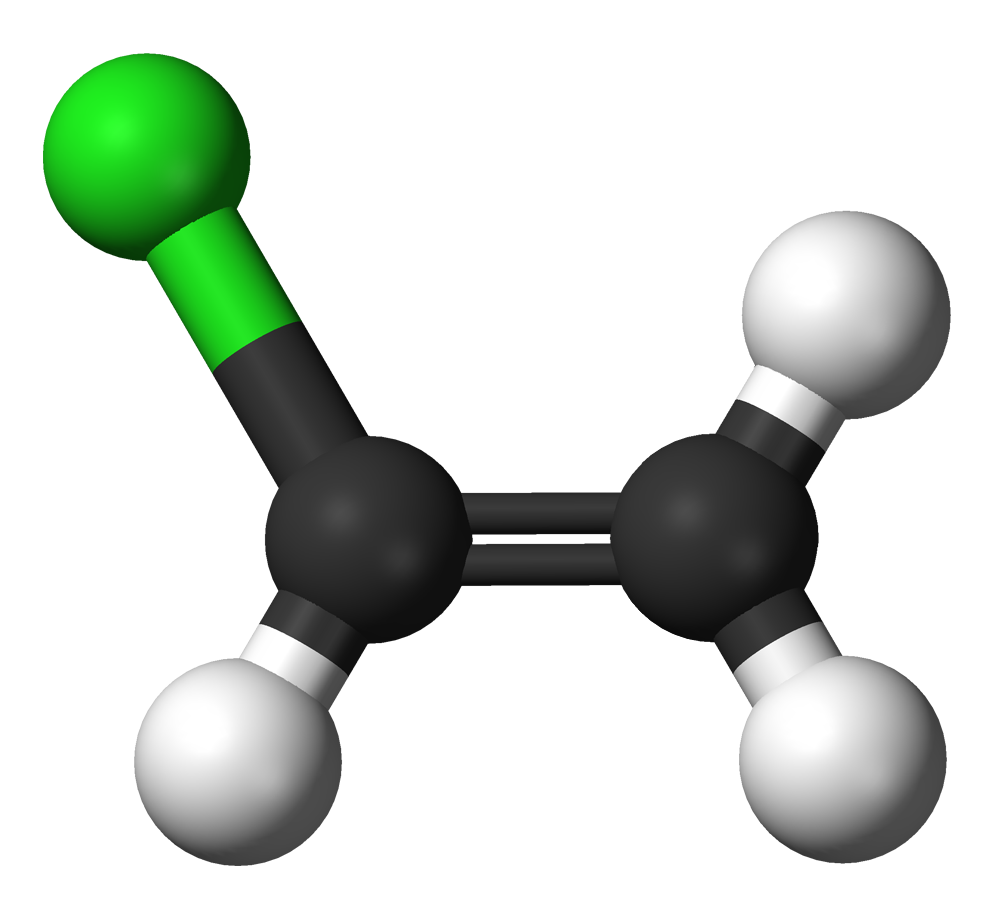
Space-filling model

Names
- Preferred IUPAC name Chloroethene
- Other names Vinyl chloride monomer VCM; Vinyl monomer VM; Chloroethylene; Refrigerant-1140

Identifiers
CAS Number	75-01-4
3D model (JSmol)	Interactive image
Beilstein Reference	1731576
ChEBI	CHEBI:28509
ChEMBL	ChEMBL2311071
ChemSpider	6098
ECHA InfoCard	100.000.756
EC Number	200-831-0
Gmelin Reference	100541
KEGG	C06793
PubChem CID	6338
RTECS number	KU9625000
UNII	WD06X94M2D
UN number	1086
CompTox Dashboard (EPA)	DTXSID8021434
- InChI: InChI=1S/C2H3Cl/c1-2-3/h2H,1H2 Key: BZHJMEDXRYGGRV-UHFFFAOYSA-N; InChI=1/C2H3Cl/c1-2-3/h2H,1H2 Key: BZHJMEDXRYGGRV-UHFFFAOYAW
- SMILES: ClC=C

Properties
Chemical formula	C_{2}H_{3}Cl
Molar mass	62.50 g·mol^{−1}
Appearance	Colorless gas
Odor	mildly sweet
Density	0.911 g/cc
Melting point	−153.8 °C (−244.8 °F; 119.3 K)
Boiling point	−13.4 °C (7.9 °F; 259.8 K)
Solubility in water	2.7 g/L (0.0432 mol/L)
Vapor pressure	2580 mmHg at 20 °C (68 °F)
Magnetic susceptibility (χ)	−35.9·10^{−6} cm^{3}/mol

Thermochemistry
Heat capacity (C)	0.8592 J/K/g (gas); 0.9504 J/K/g (solid)
Std enthalpy of formation (Δ_{f}H^{⦵}_{298})	−94.12 kJ/mol (solid)

Hazards
- GHS labelling
Pictograms	(GHS02: Flammable) (GHS08: Health hazard)
Signal word	Danger
Hazard statements	H220, H350
Precautionary statements	P201, P202, P210, P281, P308+P313, P377, P381, P403, P405, P501
NFPA 704 (fire diamond)	3 4 2
Flash point	−61 °C (−78 °F; 212 K)
Explosive limits	3.6–33%
- NIOSH (US health exposure limits)
PEL (Permissible)	TWA 1 ppm C 5 ppm [15-minute]
REL (Recommended)	Ca
IDLH (Immediate danger)	Ca [N.D.]

Related compounds
Related chloroethenes	dichloroethylenes, trichloroethylene, tetrachloroethylene, allyl chloride
- Except where otherwise noted, data are given for materials in their standard state (at 25 °C [77 °F], 100 kPa). verify (what is ?) Infobox references

Vinyl chloride is an organochloride with the formula H_{2}C=CHCl. It is also called vinyl chloride monomer (VCM) or chloroethene. It is an important industrial chemical chiefly used to produce the polymer polyvinyl chloride (PVC). A sweet-smelling gas at room temperature, vinyl chloride is colourless, flammable, and carcinogenic. Vinyl chloride monomer is among the top twenty largest petrochemicals (petroleum-derived chemicals) in world production. The United States remains the largest vinyl chloride manufacturing region because of its low-production-cost position in chlorine and ethylene raw materials. China is also a large manufacturer and one of the largest consumers of vinyl chloride. It can be formed in the environment when soil organisms break down chlorinated solvents. Vinyl chloride that is released by industries or formed by the breakdown of other chlorinated chemicals can enter the air and drinking water supplies. Vinyl chloride is a common contaminant found near landfills. Before the 1970s, vinyl chloride was used as an aerosol propellant and refrigerant.

== Uses ==
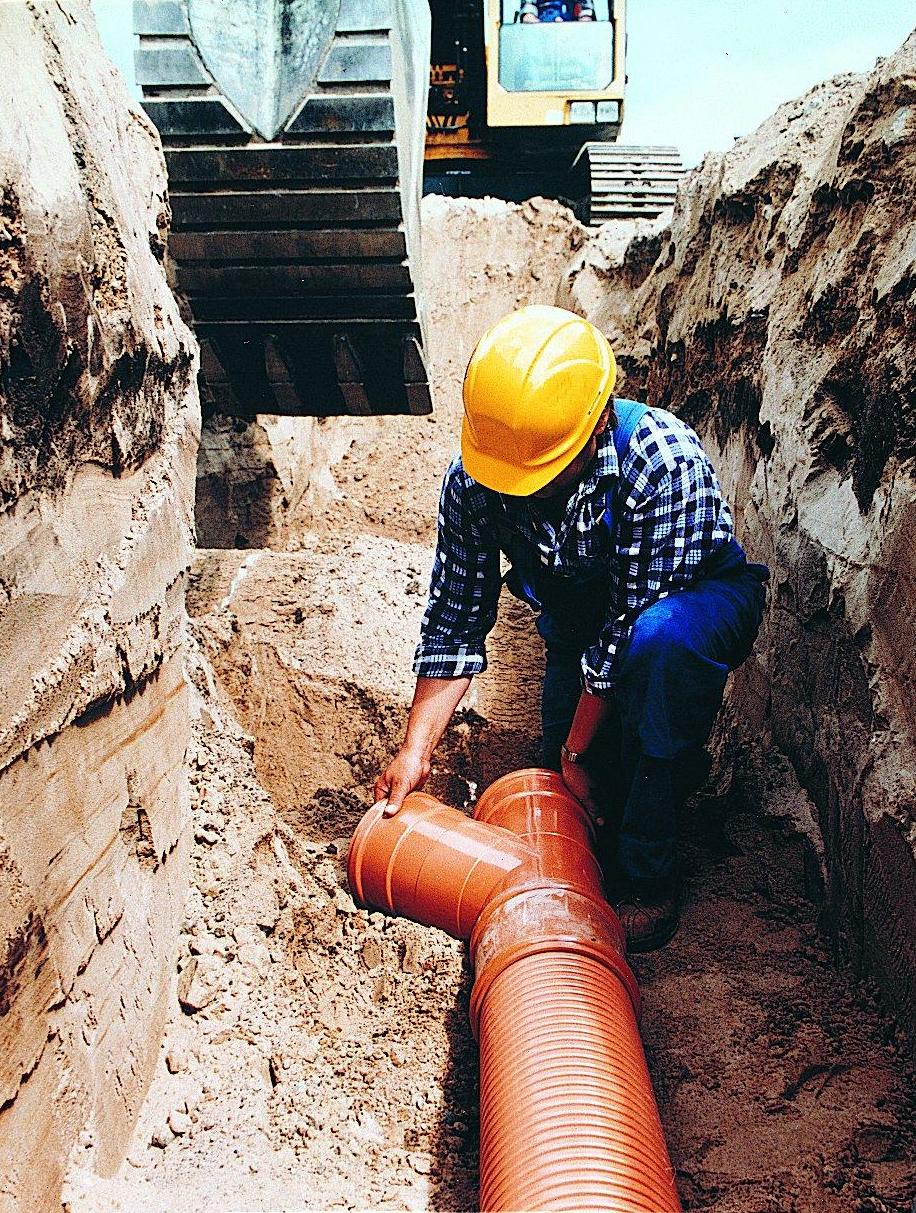
Poly(vinyl chloride) (PVC), the main end-product of vinyl chloride, is used extensively in sewage pipes due to its low cost, chemical resistance, and ease of jointing.

Vinyl chloride, also called vinyl chloride monomer (VCM), is exclusively used as a precursor to PVC. Due to its toxic nature, vinyl chloride is not found in other products. Poly(vinyl chloride) (PVC) is very stable, storable and not toxic.

Until 1974, vinyl chloride was used in aerosol spray propellant. Vinyl chloride was briefly used as an inhalational anaesthetic, in a similar vein to ethyl chloride, though its toxicity limited this use.

== Production ==
Globally, approximately 40 million tonnes of PVC resin are produced per year, resulting in approximately 10.2 million tonnes of vinyl chloride produced.

=== History ===
Vinyl chloride was first synthesized in 1835 by Justus von Liebig and his student Henri Victor Regnault. They obtained it by treating 1,2-dichloroethane with a solution of potassium hydroxide in ethanol.

=== Acetylene-based routes ===
In 1912, Fritz Klatte, a German chemist working for Griesheim-Elektron, patented a means to produce vinyl chloride from acetylene and hydrogen chloride using mercuric chloride as a catalyst. Acetylene reacts with hydrogen chloride over a mercuric chloride catalyst to give vinyl chloride:

C_{2}H_{2} + HCl → CH_{2}=CHCl

The reaction is exothermic and highly selective. Product purity and yields are generally very high.

This route to vinyl chloride was common before ethylene became widely distributed. When vinyl chloride producers shifted to using the thermal cracking of EDC described below, some used byproduct HCl in conjunction with a colocated acetylene-based unit. The hazards of storing and shipping acetylene meant that the vinyl chloride facility needed to be located very close to the acetylene generating facility.

In view of mercury's toxicity, gold- and platinum-based catalysts have been proposed.

The mercury-based technology is the main production method in China due to low price on coal from which acetylene is produced, with over 80% of national capacity as of 2018, even though the resulting PVC contains residues and is only suitable for low-end products like pipes.

=== Ethylene-based routes ===
In the United States and Europe, mercury-catalyzed routes widely used in the 20th century have been superseded by more economical and greener processes based on ethylene. Ethylene is made by cracking ethane. Two steps are involved, chlorination and dehydrochlorination:

H_{2}C=CH_{2} + Cl_{2} → H_{2}ClC−CH_{2}Cl
H_{2}ClC−CH_{2}Cl → H_{2}C=CHCl + HCl

=== Possible routes from ethane ===
Numerous attempts have been made to convert ethane directly to vinyl chloride. Ethane, which is even more readily available than ethylene, is a potential precursor to vinyl chloride. The conversion of ethane to vinyl chloride has been demonstrated by various routes:

High-temperature chlorination:

H_{3}C−CH_{3} + 2 Cl_{2} → H_{2}C=CHCl + 3 HCl

High-temperature oxychlorination, which uses oxygen and hydrogen chloride in place of chlorine:

H_{3}C−CH_{3} + O_{2} + HCl → H_{2}C=CHCl + 2 H_{2}O

High-temperature oxidative chlorination: 4 H_{3}C−CH_{3} + 3 O_{2} + 2 Cl_{2} → 4 H_{2}C=CHCl + 6 H_{2}O

==== Thermal decomposition of dichloroethane ====
1,2-Dichloroethane, ClCH_{2}CH_{2}Cl (also known as ethylene dichloride, EDC), can be prepared by halogenation of ethane or ethylene, inexpensive starting materials. EDC thermally converts into vinyl chloride and anhydrous HCl. This production method has become the major route to vinyl chloride since the late 1950s.

ClCH_{2}−CH_{2}Cl → CH_{2}=CHCl + HCl

The thermal cracking reaction is highly endothermic, and is generally carried out in a fired heater. Even though residence time and temperature are carefully controlled, it produces significant quantities of chlorinated hydrocarbon side products. In practice, the yield for EDC conversion is relatively low (50 to 60 percent). The furnace effluent is immediately quenched with cold EDC to minimize undesirable side reactions. The resulting vapor-liquid mixture then goes to a purification system. Some processes use an absorber-stripper system to separate HCl from the chlorinated hydrocarbons, while other processes use a refrigerated continuous distillation system.

== Storage and transportation ==
Vinyl chloride is stored as a liquid. The accepted upper limit of safety as a health hazard is 500 ppm. Often, the storage containers for the product vinyl chloride are high capacity spheres. The spheres have an inside sphere and an outside sphere. Several inches of space separate the inside sphere from the outside sphere. The interstitial space between the spheres is purged with an inert gas such as nitrogen. As the nitrogen purge gas exits the interstitial space it passes through an analyzer that detects whether any vinyl chloride is leaking from the internal sphere. If vinyl chloride starts to leak from the internal sphere or if a fire is detected on the outside of the sphere then the contents of the sphere are automatically dumped into an emergency underground storage container. Containers used for handling vinyl chloride at atmospheric temperature are always under pressure. Inhibited vinyl chloride may be stored at normal atmospheric conditions in suitable pressure vessels. Uninhibited vinyl chloride may be stored either under refrigeration or at normal atmospheric temperature in the absence of air or sunlight but only for a duration of a few days. If stored for longer periods, regular checks must be made to confirm no polymerization has taken place.

In addition to its toxicity risk, transporting vinyl chloride also presents the same risks as transporting other flammable gases such as propane, butane, or natural gas. Examples of incidents in which this danger was observed include the 2023 Ohio train derailment, in which derailed tank cars dumped 100,000 gallons of hazardous materials, including vinyl chloride.

== Fire and explosion hazard ==
In the U.S., OSHA lists vinyl chloride as a Class IA Flammable Liquid, with a National Fire Protection Association Flammability Rating of 4. Because of its low boiling point, liquid vinyl chloride will undergo flash evaporation (i.e., autorefrigerate) upon its release to atmospheric pressure. The portion vaporized will form a dense cloud (more than twice as heavy as the surrounding air). The risk of subsequent explosion or fire is significant. According to OSHA, the flash point of vinyl chloride is −78 °C (−108.4 °F). Its flammable limits in air are: lower 3.6 volume% and upper 33.0 volume%. The explosive limits are: lower 4.0%, upper 22.05% by volume in air. Fire may release toxic hydrogen chloride (HCl) and carbon monoxide (CO) and trace levels of phosgene. Vinyl chloride can polymerise rapidly due to heating and under the influence of air, light and contact with a catalyst, strong oxidisers and metals such as copper and aluminium, with fire or explosion hazard. As a gas mixed with air, vinyl chloride is a fire and explosion hazard. On standing, vinyl chloride can form peroxides, which may then explode. Vinyl chloride will react with iron and steel in the presence of moisture.

== Health effects ==
Since it is a gas under most ambient conditions, primary exposure is via inhalation, as opposed to the consumption of contaminated food or water, with occupational hazards being highest. Prior to 1974, workers were commonly exposed to 1,000 ppm vinyl chloride, causing "vinyl chloride illness" such as acroosteolysis and Raynaud's phenomenon. The symptoms of vinyl chloride exposure are classified by ppm levels in ambient air with 4,000 ppm having a threshold effect. The intensity of symptoms varies from acute (1,000–8,000 ppm), including dizziness, nausea, visual disturbances, headache, and ataxia, to chronic (above 12,000 ppm), including narcotic effect, cardiac arrhythmias, and fatal respiratory failure. Reactive airway dysfunction syndrome (RADS) may be caused by acute exposure to vinyl chloride.

Vinyl chloride is a mutagen having clastogenic effects which affect lymphocyte chromosomal structure. Vinyl chloride is a IARC group 1 Carcinogen posing elevated risks of rare angiosarcoma, brain and lung tumors, and malignant haematopoietic lymphatic tumors. Chronic exposure leads to common forms of respiratory failure (emphysema, pulmonary fibrosis) and focused hepatotoxicity (hepatomegaly, hepatic fibrosis). Continuous exposure can cause CNS depression including euphoria and disorientation. Decreased male libido, miscarriage, and birth defects are known major reproductive defects associated with vinyl chloride.

Vinyl chloride can have acute dermal and ocular effects. Dermal exposure effects are thickening of skin, edema, decreased elasticity, local frostbites, blistering, and irritation. The complete loss of skin elasticity expresses itself in Raynaud's Phenomenon.

=== Liver toxicity ===
The hepatotoxicity of vinyl chloride has long been established since the 1930s when the PVC industry was just in its early stages. In the very first study about the dangers of vinyl chloride, published by Patty in 1930, it was disclosed that exposure of test animals to just a single short-term high dose of vinyl chloride caused liver damage. In 1949, a Russian publication discussed the finding that vinyl chloride caused liver injury among workers. In 1954, B.F. Goodrich Chemical stated that vinyl chloride caused liver injury upon short-term exposures. Almost nothing was known about its long-term effects. They also recommended long-term animal toxicology studies. The study noted that if a chemical did justify the cost of testing, and its ill-effects on workers and the public were known, the chemical should not be made. In 1963, research paid for in part by Allied Chemical found liver damage in test animals from exposures below 500 parts per million (ppm). Also in 1963, a Romanian researcher published findings of liver disease in vinyl chloride workers. In 1968, Mutchler and Kramer, two Dow researchers, reported their finding that exposures as low as 300 ppm caused liver damage in vinyl chloride workers thus confirming earlier animal data in humans. In a 1969 presentation given in Japan, P. L. Viola, a European researcher working for the European vinyl chloride industry, indicated, "every monomer used in V.C. manufacture is hazardous....various changes were found in bone and liver. Particularly, much more attention should be drawn to liver changes. The findings in rats at the concentration of 4 to 10 ppm are shown in pictures." In light of the finding of liver damage in rats from just 4–10 ppm of vinyl chloride exposure, Viola added that he "should like some precautions to be taken in the manufacturing plants polymerizing vinyl chloride, such as a reduction of the threshold limit value of monomer." Vinyl chloride was first reported to induce angiosarcoma of the liver in 1974 and further research has demonstrated the carcinogenicity of VC to other organs and at lower concentrations, with evidence now extending to jobs associated with poly(vinyl chloride) exposure, indicating the need for prudent control of PVC dust in the industrial setting.

Vinyl chloride is now an IARC group 1 carcinogen known to cause hepatic angiosarcoma (HAS) in highly exposed industrial workers. Vinyl chloride monomer, a component in the production of poly(vinyl chloride) (PVC) resins, is a halogenated hydrocarbon with acute toxic effects, as well as chronic carcinogenic effects.

=== Cancerous tumors ===
Animals exposed to 30,000 ppm of vinyl chloride developed cancerous tumors. Studies on vinyl chloride workers were a "red flag" to B.F. Goodrich and the industry. In 1972, Maltoni, another Italian researcher for the European vinyl chloride industry, found liver tumors (including angiosarcoma) from vinyl chloride exposures as low as 250 ppm for four hours a day.

In 1997 the U.S. Centers for Disease Control and Prevention (CDC) concluded that the development and acceptance by the PVC industry of a closed loop polymerization process in the late 1970s "almost completely eliminated worker exposures" and that "new cases of hepatic angiosarcoma in vinyl chloride polymerization workers have been virtually eliminated."

The Houston Chronicle claimed in 1998 that the vinyl industry manipulated vinyl chloride studies to avoid liability for worker exposure and hid extensive and severe chemical spills in local communities.

=== Environment pollution ===
According to the U.S. EPA, "vinyl chloride emissions from poly(vinyl chloride) (PVC), ethylene dichloride (EDC), and vinyl chloride monomer (VCM) plants cause or contribute to air pollution that may reasonably be anticipated to result in an increase in mortality or an increase in serious irreversible, or incapacitating reversible illness. Vinyl chloride is a known human carcinogen that causes a rare cancer of the liver." EPA's 2001 updated Toxicological Profile and Summary Health Assessment for vinyl chloride in its Integrated Risk Information System (IRIS) database lowers EPA's previous risk factor estimate by a factor of 20 and concludes that "because of the consistent evidence for liver cancer in all the studies [...] and the weaker association for other sites, it is concluded that the liver is the most sensitive site, and protection against liver cancer will protect against possible cancer induction in other tissues."

=== Mechanism ===
The carcinogenicity of VC is attributed to the action of two metabolites, chloroethylene oxide and chloroacetaldehyde. The former is produced by the action of cytochrome P-450 on VC. Both chloroethylene oxide and chloroacetaldehyde are alkylating agents.

== Microbial remediation ==
The bacteria species Nitrosomonas europaea can degrade a variety of halogenated compounds including trichloroethylene, and vinyl chloride.

== See also ==
- Vinyl group
- List of refrigerants, for R-1140
- 2023 Ohio train derailment, in which a large amount of vinyl chloride was spilled
