= Glaphyromorphus othelarrni =

Conservation status
- Least Concern (IUCN 3.1)

Scientific classification
- Kingdom: Animalia
- Phylum: Chordata
- Class: Reptilia
- Order: Squamata
- Suborder: Scinciformata
- Infraorder: Scincomorpha
- Family: Sphenomorphidae
- Genus: Glaphyromorphus
- Species: G. othelarrni

Binomial name
- Glaphyromorphus othelarrni Hoskin & Couper, 2014

Species of lizard

The Cape Melville bar-lipped skink (Glaphyromorphus othelarrni) is a species of skink in the genus Glaphyromorphusfound, found in Queensland in Australia.
