= Chloroacetaldehyde =

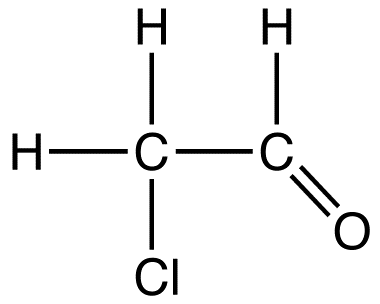
Structural formula
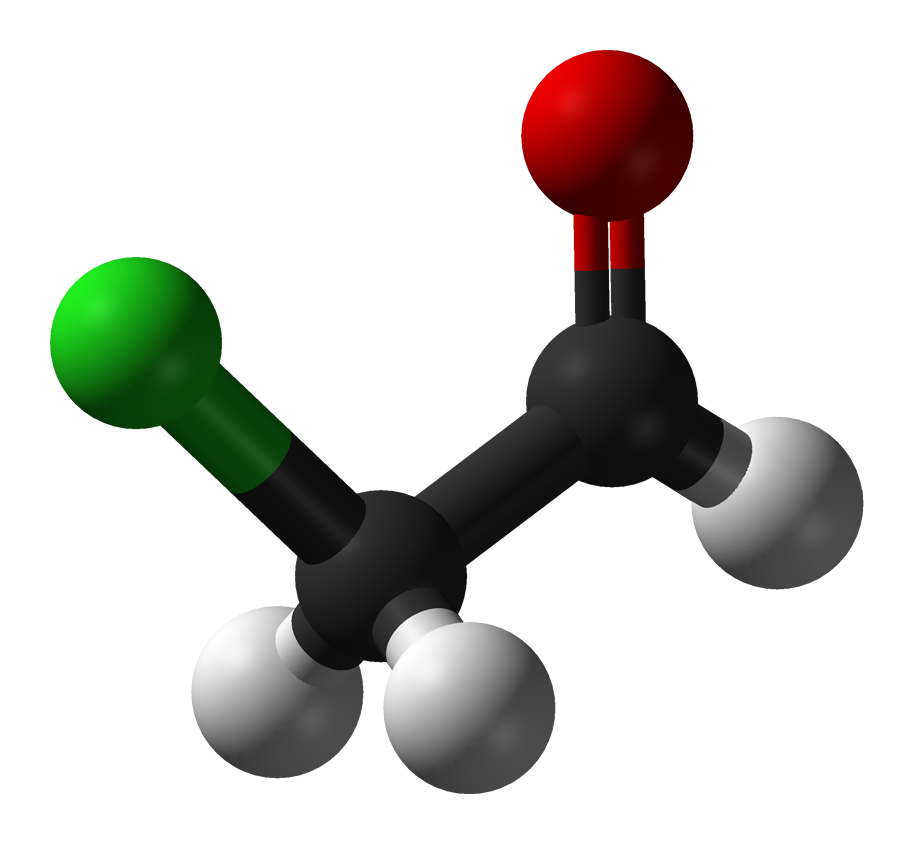
Ball-and-stick model

Names
- Preferred IUPAC name Chloroacetaldehyde
- Systematic IUPAC name Chloroethanal
- Other names 2-Chloroacetaldehyde; 2-Chloroethanal

Identifiers
CAS Number	107-20-0; 34789-09-8 (hydrate)
3D model (JSmol)	Interactive image
ChEBI	CHEBI:27871
ChemSpider	32
ECHA InfoCard	100.003.158
EC Number	203-472-8
PubChem CID	33
UNII	CF069F5D9C; 61S63ROQ1E (hydrate)
CompTox Dashboard (EPA)	DTXSID4020292
- InChI: InChI=1S/C2H3ClO/c3-1-2-4/h2H,1H2 Key: QSKPIOLLBIHNAC-UHFFFAOYSA-N
- SMILES: C(C=O)Cl

Properties
Chemical formula	C_{2}H_{3}ClO
Molar mass	78.50 g mol^{−1}
Appearance	Colourless liquid
Odor	acrid, penetrating
Density	1.117 g/mL
Melting point	−16.3 °C (2.7 °F; 256.8 K) hydrate melts at 43–50 °C
Boiling point	85 to 85.5 °C (185.0 to 185.9 °F; 358.1 to 358.6 K)
Solubility in water	soluble
Solubility	organic solvents

Hazards
- Occupational safety and health (OHS/OSH)
Main hazards	alkylating agent
- GHS labelling
Pictograms	(GHS05: Corrosive) (GHS06: Toxic) (GHS08: Health hazard) (GHS09: Environmental hazard)
Signal word	Danger
Hazard statements	H301, H311, H314, H330, H351, H400
Flash point	87.7 °C (189.9 °F) (closed cup)
- Lethal dose or concentration (LD, LC)
LD_{50} (median dose)	89 mg/kg (oral, rat); 82 mg/kg (oral, mouse)
LC_{50} (median concentration)	200 ppm (rat, 1 hr)
- NIOSH (US health exposure limits)
PEL (Permissible)	C 1 ppm (3 mg/m^{3})
REL (Recommended)	C 1 ppm (3 mg/m^{3})
IDLH (Immediate danger)	45 ppm

Related compounds
Related compounds	2-chloroethanol, Chloroacetic acid
- Except where otherwise noted, data are given for materials in their standard state (at 25 °C [77 °F], 100 kPa). verify (what is ?) Infobox references

Chloroacetaldehyde is an organic compound with the formula ClCH_{2}CHO. Like some related compounds, it is highly electrophilic reagent and a potentially dangerous alkylating agent. The compound is not normally encountered in the anhydrous form, but rather as the hemiacetal (ClCH_{2}CH(OH))_{2}.

Chloroacetaldehyde is a metabolite of the antineoplastic ifosfamide and believed to be responsible for some of the toxicity observed with ifosfamide.

== Synthesis and occurrence ==
Hydrated chloroacetaldehyde is produced by the chlorination of aqueous vinyl chloride:

ClCH=CH_{2} + Cl_{2} + H_{2}O → ClCH_{2}CHO + 2 HCl

It can also be prepared from vinyl acetate or by careful chlorination of acetaldehyde. The related bromoacetaldehyde is prepared via bromination of vinyl acetate. It also rapidly forms an acetals in the presence of alcohols.

Water free chloroacetaldehyde is prepared from the hydrate by azeotropic distillation with chloroform, toluene, or carbon tetrachloride. Anhydrous chloroacetaldehyde reversibly converts to polyacetals. Less reactive chloroacetaldehyde derivatives might be used instead to obtain chloroacetaldehyde or bypass its intermediate formation completely: e.g. chloroacetaldehyde dimethyl acetal (2-chloro-1,1-dimethoxyethane) hydrolyzes in acidic conditions to give chloroacetaldehyde, which may then quickly react with the other reagents instead of polymerizing.

Relevant to its occurrence in humans, it arises via the isomerization of chloroethylene oxide, a metabolite of vinyl chloride.

== Reactions ==
Chloroacetaldehyde readily hydrates:

Being bifunctional, chloroacetaldehyde is a precursor to many heterocyclic compounds. It condenses with thiourea derivatives to give aminothiazoles. This reaction was once used in the preparation of sulfathiazole, one of the first sulfa drugs. Chloroacetaldehyde is a building block in the synthesis of the pharmaceuticals altizide, polythiazide, brotizolam, and ciclotizolam. Chloroacetaldehyde is an alkylating agent. It reacts with adenosine and cytidine to give cyclic products containing a fused imidazole group. This reaction is related to the possible mutagenic properties of chloroacetaldehyde.

== Environmental aspects ==
Chloroacetaldehyde is a metabolite in the degradation of 1,2-dichloroethane, which initially converts to chloroethanol. This metabolic pathway is topical because 1,2-dichloroethane is produced on a large scale as a precursor to vinyl chloride.

== Safety ==
Chloroacetaldehyde is corrosive to mucous membranes. It irritates eyes, skin and respiratory tract.

Based on data collected from human studies in 1962, exposures to 45 ppm of chloroacetaldehyde were found to be disagreeable and caused conjunctival irritation to the subjects. The Occupational Safety and Health Administration established a permissible exposure limit at a ceiling of 1 ppm (3 mg/m^{3}) for exposures to chloroacetaldehyde.

== See also ==
- Acetyl chloride
- Chloroethylene oxide
