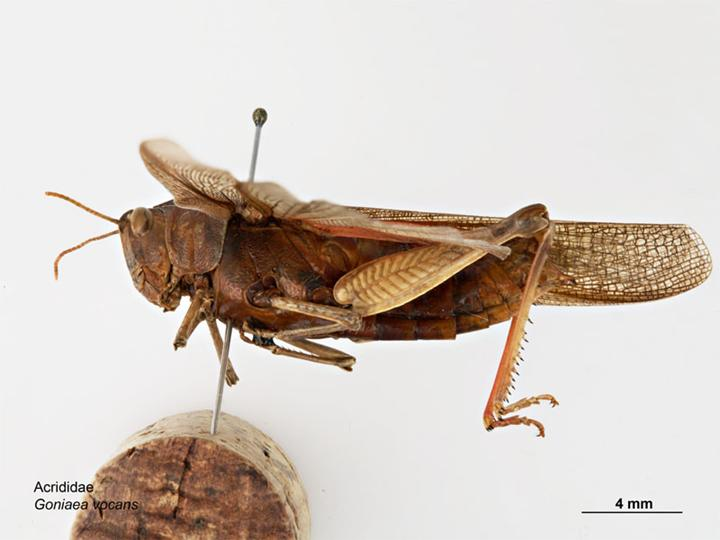

Scientific classification
- Domain: Eukaryota
- Kingdom: Animalia
- Phylum: Arthropoda
- Class: Insecta
- Order: Orthoptera
- Suborder: Caelifera
- Family: Acrididae
- Genus: Goniaea
- Species: G. vocans

Binomial name
- Goniaea vocans J.C. Fabricius 1775

= Goniaea vocans =

Species of grasshopper

Goniaea vocans is a species of grasshopper in the family Acrididae.

== Synonyms ==
The following are synonyms of this species:

- Goniaea acuta Sjöstedt, 1921
- Goniaea auripennis Sjöstedt, 1921
- Goniaea flava Tepper, 1896
- Goniaea fuscobasalis Sjöstedt, 1921
- Goniaea grootensis Sjöstedt, 1930
- Goniaea hyalina Sjöstedt, 1921
- Goniaea maculicornis Stål, 1878
- Goniaea micronotum Sjöstedt, 1936
- Goniaea mjoebergi Sjöstedt, 1920
- Goniaea planiformis Sjöstedt, 1934
