= Chloroethylene oxide =

Names
- Other names 2-chlorooxirane, CEO

Identifiers
CAS Number	7763-77-1
3D model (JSmol)	Interactive image
ChEBI	CHEBI:29129
ChemSpider	22880
KEGG	C20303
PubChem CID	24472
CompTox Dashboard (EPA)	DTXSID10998848
- InChI: InChI=1S/C2H3ClO/c3-2-1-4-2/h2H,1H2 Key: WBNCHVFLFSFIGK-UHFFFAOYSA-N
- SMILES: C1C(O1)Cl

Properties
Chemical formula	C_{2}H_{3}ClO
Molar mass	78.50 g·mol^{−1}
Appearance	colorless liquid
Boiling point	40–55 °C (104–131 °F; 313–328 K)
- Except where otherwise noted, data are given for materials in their standard state (at 25 °C [77 °F], 100 kPa). Infobox references

Chloroethylene oxide is the organic compound with the formula ClC_{2}H_{3}O. It is the epoxide of vinyl chloride. The compound is rarely observed, but it is widely proposed as a metabolite of vinyl chloride, formed by the action of cytochrome-P450. It is significant because it causes DNA alkylation. It isomerizes to chloroacetaldehyde, which modifies adenosine residues by conversion to 1,N^{6}-ethenodeoxyadenosine (εdA).
