= Phloem loading =

Phloem loading is the process of loading carbon into the phloem for transport to different 'sinks' in a plant. Sinks include metabolism, growth, storage, and other processes or organs that need carbon solutes to persist. It can be a passive process, relying on a pressure gradient to generate diffusion of solutes through the symplast, or an active process, requiring energy to create membrane-bound transporter proteins that move solutes through the apoplast against a gradient. Passive phloem loading transports solutes freely through plasmodesma in the symplast of the minor veins of leaves. Active transport occurs apoplastically and does not use plasmodesmata. An intermediate type of loading exists that uses symplastic transport but utilizes a size-exclusion mechanism to ensure diffusion is a one-way process between the mesophyll and phloem cells. This process is referred to as polymer-trapping, in which simple solutes such as sucrose are synthesized into larger molecules such as stachyose or raffinose in intermediary cells. The larger molecules cannot diffuse back to the mesophyll but can move into the phloem's sieve cells. Therefore, the synthesis of larger compounds uses energy and is thus 'active' but this strategy does not require specialized proteins and can still move symplastically.

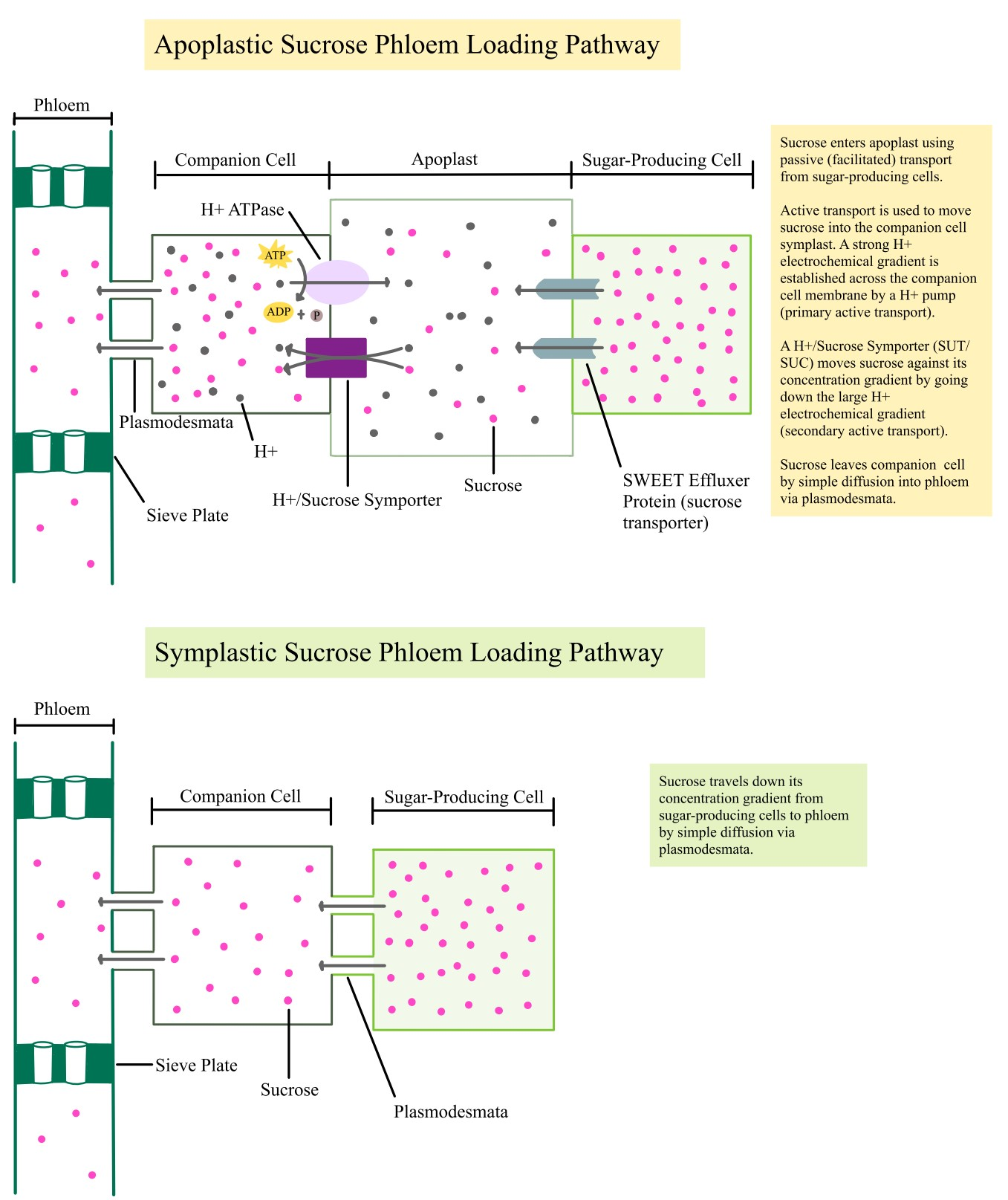
Apoplastic loading utilizes active (primary and secondary) and passive transport, while Symplastic loading relies on simple diffusion.

== History ==
Different phloem loading mechanisms were first described by Russian biologist Yuri Gamalei in 1989, who also demonstrated their correlation with leaf anatomy. He found that plasmodesmatal abundance in the minor veins of leaves was correlated with a plant's loading strategy. Plasmodesmata allow solutes to diffuse through the symplast. Thus, plants with a lot of plasmodesmata are generally passive loaders. Plants with few or absent plasmodesmata are usually active loaders since they do not have a way for solutes to pass through the symplast.

In 2001, Robert Turgeon and colleagues found that plasmodesmatal frequency is not the sole indicator of a plant's phloem-loading strategy. While the presence of abundant plasmodesmata does allow for passive, symplastic transport, it does not exclude the possibility of active, apoplastic transport. The amount of plasmodesmata in a leaf is an aspect of a species' anatomy and not necessarily a determinant of phloem-loading strategy. Plants with a polymer-trapping mechanism may have an abundance of plasmodesmata, but this trait alone does not indicate this loading strategy. Therefore, to accurately determine phloem-loading mechanisms, the type and amount of transport solute must also be identified. A plant's phloem-loading strategy can be accurately determined by combining data on solute type, solute concentration and plasmodesmatal abundance.

== Phloem loading and growth form ==
Active phloem loading requires less carbon, allowing carbon allocation to other sinks in the plant, such as growth. Active phloem loading allows for higher growth potential. Herbaceous plants have a relatively high growth rate and many are active phloem loaders. Active loaders tend to have a high hydraulic conductivity and low solute concentrations, while passive loaders have high solute concentrations and a low hydraulic conductivity. Trees also exhibit high solute concentrations and low hydraulic conductivity and thus are thought to be passive loaders. Based on early research, scientists correlated herbaceous species with active loading and trees and other woody species with passive loading. However, in 2011, Davidson et al. examined the correlation between growth from and phloem-loading strategy. They found that a loose association exists but not a definitive correlation. Some trees exhibit active loading, while some herbs exhibit passive loading, and many species have mechanisms of both.
