= Rachilla =

Rachilla may refer to the following topics in botany:

- Rachilla (floral axis), the part of the spikelet that bears the florets in grasses and sedges
- Rachilla (rachis), a secondary rachis in leaves that are compound more than once
